= Douglas Mawson =

Australian geologist and explorer of the Antarctic (1882–1958)

Sir Douglas Mawson OBE FRS FAA
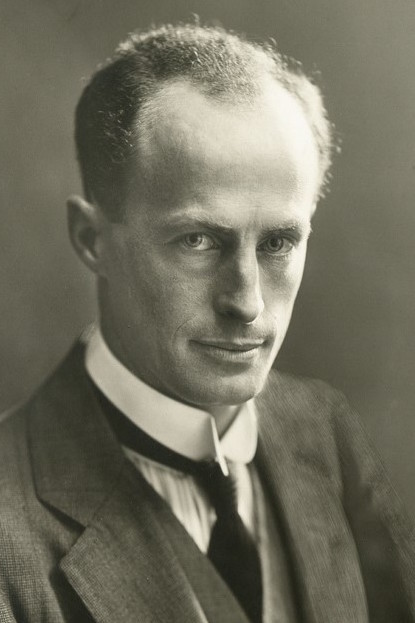
- Mawson in 1914
- Born: 5 May 1882; Shipley, West Riding of Yorkshire, England
- Died: 14 October 1958 (aged 76); Brighton, South Australia, Australia
- Education: Fort Street Model School; University of Sydney (B.E., 1902; B.Sc. 1905); University of Adelaide (D.Sc., 1909)
- Occupations: Geologist, Antarctic explorer, academic
- Known for: First ascent of Mount Erebus; First team to reach the South magnetic pole; Sole survivor of Far Eastern Party; Australasian Antarctic Expedition; Mawson's Huts; Mawson Plateau
- Spouse(s): Francisca Paquita Delprat (1891–1974), married 1914
- Children: Patricia; Jessica
- Awards: Fellow of the Royal Society; Fellow of the Australian Academy of Science; Bigsby Medal (1919); Mueller Medal (1930); Clarke Medal (1936); Polar Medal (1909, 1934)

Sir Douglas Mawson (5 May 1882 – 14 October 1958) was an Australian geologist, Antarctic explorer and academic. He is known for being a key expedition leader during the Heroic Age of Antarctic Exploration, along with Roald Amundsen, Robert Falcon Scott and Sir Ernest Shackleton (with whom he undertook the Nimrod Expedition in 1907–1909). However, most of his geological work was undertaken in South Australia, in particular the Precambrian rocks of the Flinders Ranges.

Mawson was born in England and was brought to Australia as an infant. He completed degrees in mining engineering and geology at the University of Sydney, after which he was appointed lecturer in petrology and mineralogy at the University of Adelaide in 1906. From 1903 onwards he undertook significant geological exploration, including an expedition to the New Hebrides (now Vanuatu) in 1903, and later in the Flinders Ranges and far north-east of South Australia and over the border near Broken Hill in New South Wales. He was interested in the commercial applications of geology, in particular the radioactive minerals being used in medical applications in the early 1900s. He identified and first described the mineral davidite in 1906, and later became an expert in the geochemistry of igneous and metamorphic rocks. Much of his later work was focused on the Precambrian rocks Adelaide Superbasin (which included the Flinders and Barrier Ranges), where there are significant fossil beds showing the beginnings of animal life on Earth.

Mawson's first experience in the Antarctic came as a member of Shackleton's Nimrod Expedition (1907–1909), alongside his geologist lecturer and mentor Edgeworth David. They were part of a group which became the first to climb Mount Erebus in March 1908. Mawson, David and Alistair Mackay formed the expedition's northern party, which later, setting off in October 1908, became the first people to attain the South magnetic pole. After his participation in Shackleton's expedition, Mawson became the principal instigator and leader of the Australasian Antarctic Expedition (1911–1914). The expedition explored thousands of kilometres of previously unexplored regions, collected geological and botanical samples, and made important scientific observations. Mawson was the sole survivor of the three-man Far Eastern Party in 1912–1913, which travelled across the Mertz and Ninnis Glaciers, named after his two deceased companions. Their deaths forced him to travel alone for over a month to return to the expedition's main base, which became known as Mawson's Huts. Mawson's account of the expedition was published in 1915 as The Home of the Blizzard.

Mawson was knighted in 1914, and during the second half of World War I worked as a non-combatant with the British and Russian militaries. He returned to the University of Adelaide in 1919 and became a full professor in 1921, contributing much to Australian geology.

He returned to the Antarctic as the leader of the British Australian and New Zealand Antarctic Research Expedition (aka BANZARE, 1929–1931), which led to a territorial claim in the form of the Australian Antarctic Territory. The two long summer voyages were also noteworthy for the major oceanographic as well as terrestrial collections.

Mawson is commemorated by numerous landmarks, and from 1984 to 1996 appeared on the Australian $100 note.

== Early life and education ==
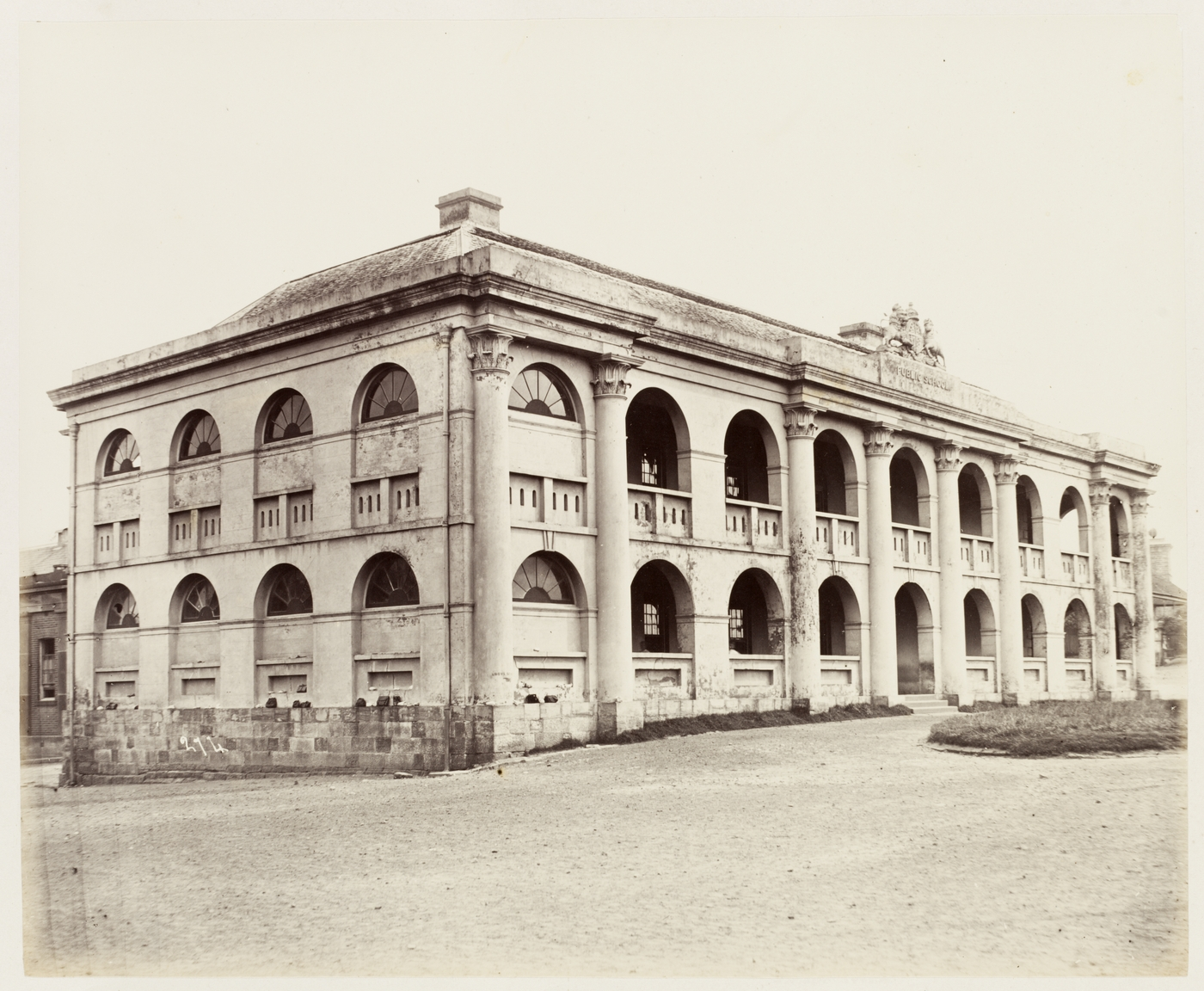
Fort Street Model School, 1872

Douglas Mawson was born on 5 May 1882, the second son of Robert Ellis Mawson and Margaret Ann Moore (who was from the Isle of Man). He was born in Shipley, West Riding of Yorkshire, but was under the age of two when his family emigrated to Australia and settled at Rooty Hill, now in the western suburbs of Sydney. Elder brother William was around two years older.

In 1893 the family moved to the inner-Sydney suburb of Glebe, where they lived in a double-storey Victorian house at 28 Toxteth Road. The home was nominated for a Blue Plaque in 2021. Douglas first attended Plumpton Public School (then called Woodstock, and later known as Plumpton Primary School) in Plumpton, an outer-western suburb of Sydney, along with his brother William. They both attended Forest Lodge Superior Public School in Glebe, and then Fort Street Model School in Observatory Hill, Sydney, both graduating in 1898, despite the age difference. It was at Fort Street that Mawson developed his interest in geology.

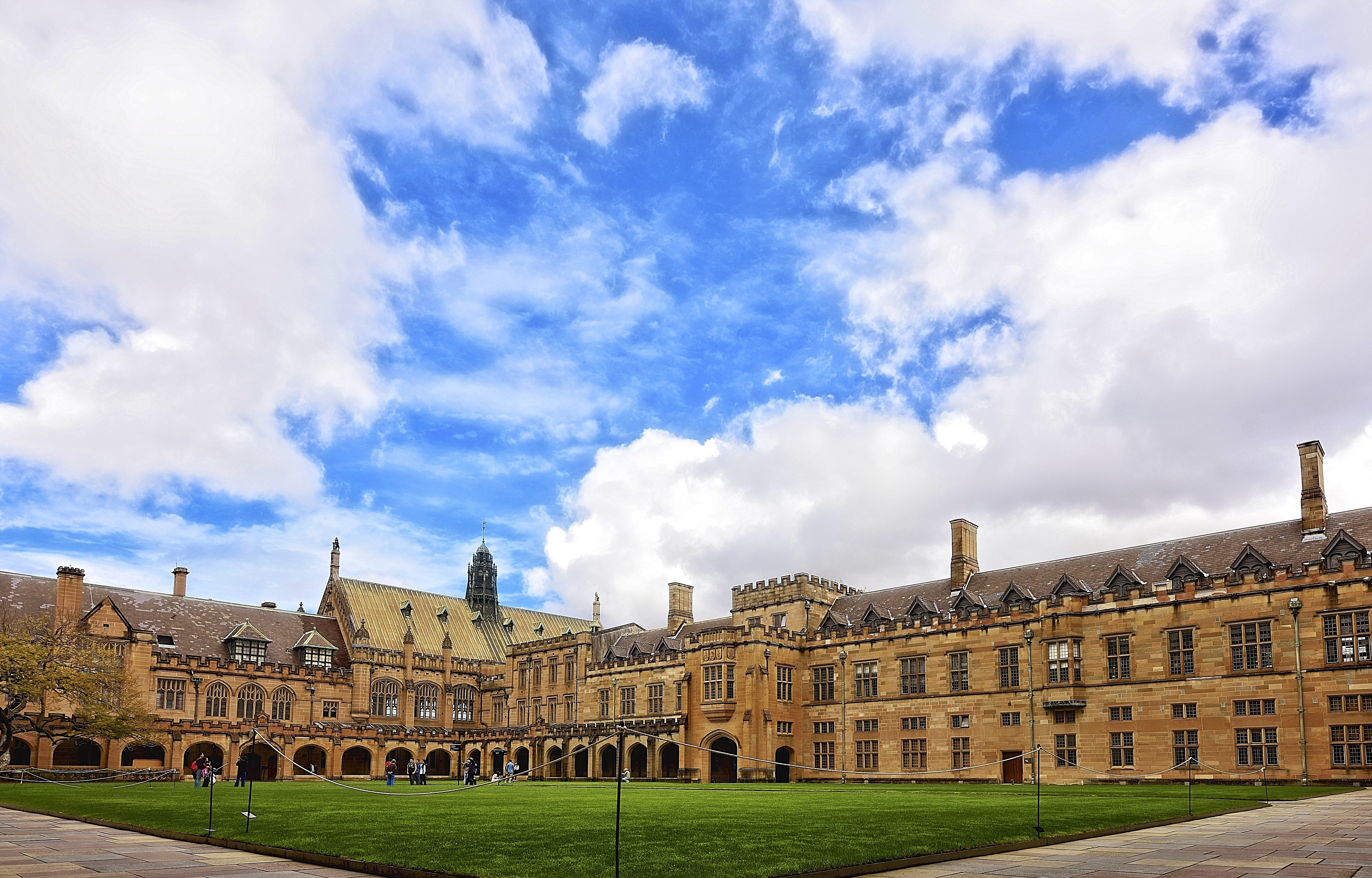
University of Sydney

He entered the University of Sydney in March 1899, aged just 16, the same year as his brother. Douglas enrolled in a degree in mining engineering. His studies covered a number of subjects over the three-year degree, obtaining first class honours in geology and mineralogy in his second year, and winning a prize in petrology. He graduated with a Bachelor of Engineering degree in mining and metallurgy on 19 April 1902 with second-class honours. Even before graduating, he was appointed as a junior demonstrator in chemistry, with the approval of chemistry professor Archibald Liversidge, and with geologist Edgeworth David as his referee. Both men became major influences in his geological career.

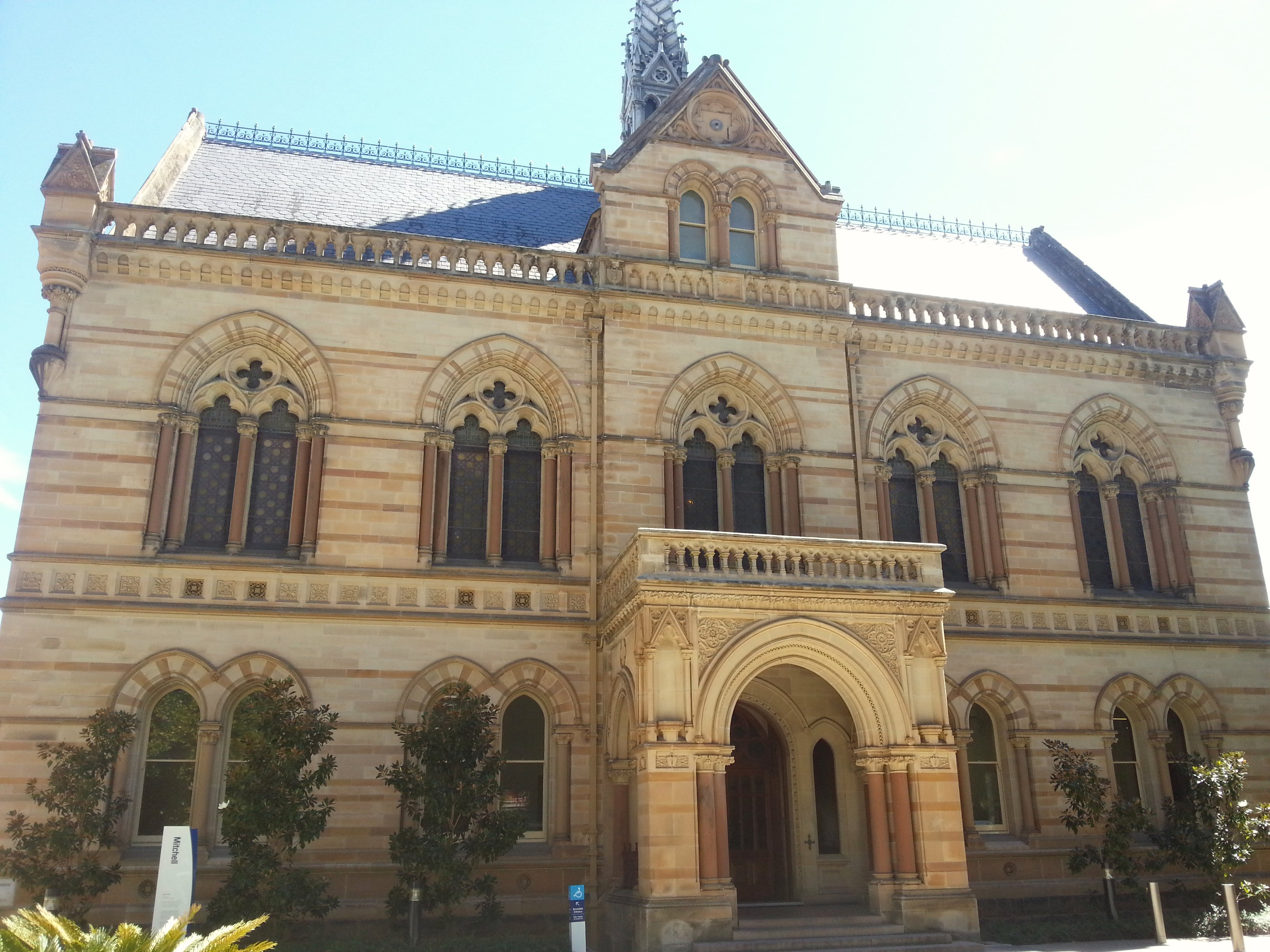
Mitchell Building, University of Adelaide

He returned to study at Sydney University in 1904, graduating with a Bachelor of Science degree with first-class honours in geology and mineralogy on 6 May 1905. By the time he graduated, he had already completed fieldwork for two papers, first in Mittagong, New South Wales, and then the New Hebrides (Vanuatu).

In 1909, Mawson was awarded a Doctor of Science (D.Sc.) degree at the University of Adelaide, for his thesis about the geology of the Barrier Ranges, in the Olary area in South Australia and over the border in New South Wales.

== Career ==
=== Early work ===
In 1903 Mawson published a geological paper on Mittagong, New South Wales, with fellow science student and friend Thomas Griffith Taylor, based on joint field trips done over the course of around 18 months, and building on data created by the Geological Survey of New South Wales. Their study focused on igneous rocks, in particular their chemical composition. The paper was read at the Royal Society of New South Wales in October 1903 by Edgeworth David.

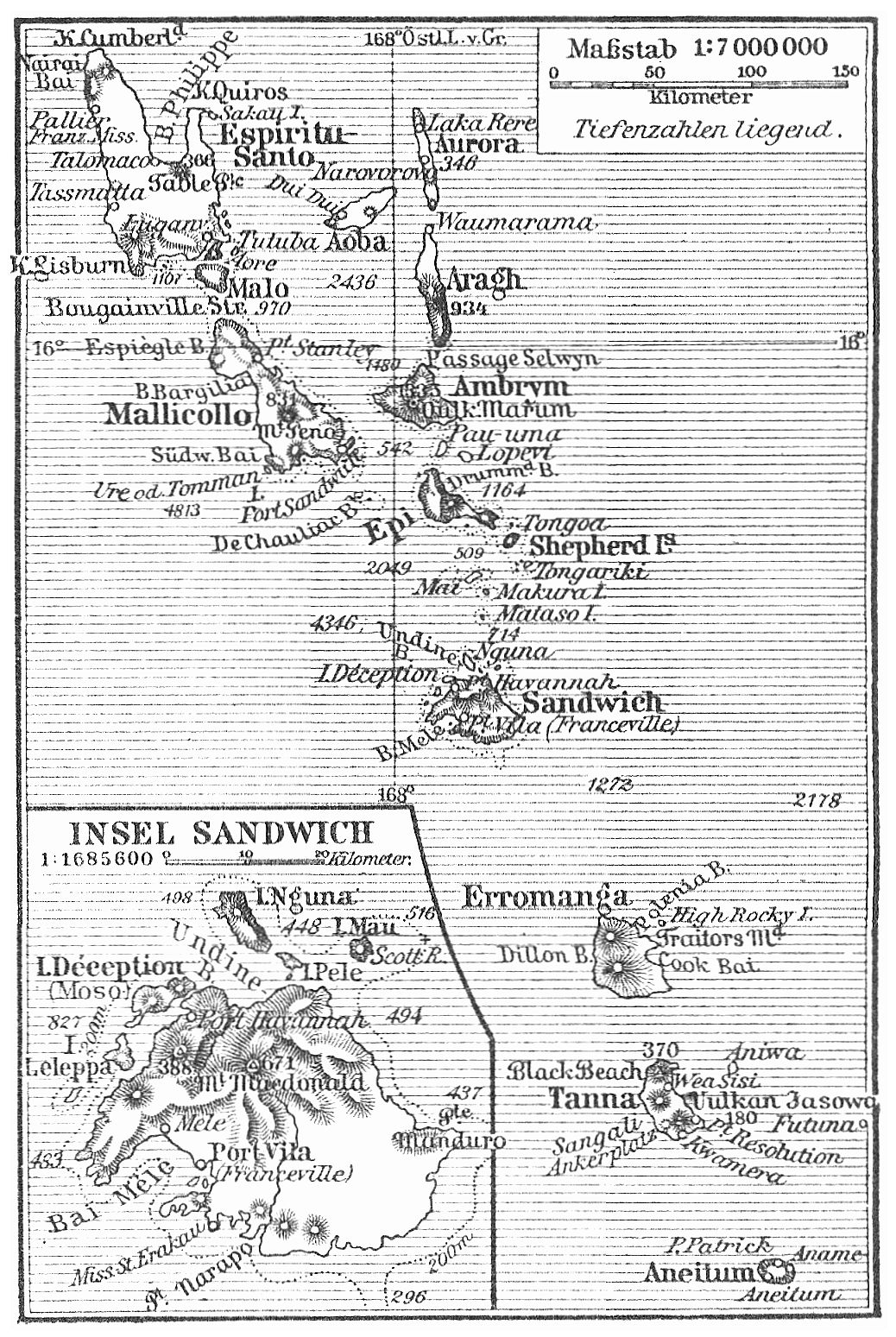
A 1905 map of the New Hebrides; "Sandwich" is Efate.

Mawson's first major independent geological work occurred when he was appointed geologist by Edgeworth David to an expedition to the New Hebrides (now Vanuatu) from April to September 1903. He travelled there with medical student W. T. Quaife, who acted as the expedition's biologist, (Note: The two men continued to keep in touch, and Mawson later asked Quaife to join the 1911–14 AAE expedition, but Quaife declined, saying that he was ill-qualified to act as biologist for such a trip.) aboard the Ysabel, under the auspices of the British Deputy Commissioner of the New Hebrides, Captain Ernest Rason. (Note: AKA British resident commissioner, 1902–1907) HMS Archer was also used on the trip. The South Australian Museum holds many of Mawson's original field notes and some photographs from this trip, as well as a bibliography compiled by Mawson before setting out. The first results of the expedition were presented on 11 January 1904 at a meeting of the Australasian Association for the Advancement of Science (AAAS) in Dunedin on Mawson's behalf by David, who was then president of the AAAS. Mawson's more detailed report, "The Geology of the New Hebrides", published in the Proceedings of the Linnean Society of New South Wales in December 1905, was one of the first major geological works of Melanesia. The report included geological maps of the islands of Efate and Santo.

In 1904, Mawson and chemist/physicist T. H. Laby were the first to identify radium-bearing ore in Australia, in samples of monazite collected from the Pilbara in Western Australia. They also examined other samples collected from across New South Wales, including the Barrier Ranges, not far from Olary, South Australia, where uranium was identified a couple of years later. Mawson built an electroscope based on the design of C. T. R. Wilson in Sydney University engineering laboratory to test samples from their field trips. Professor Edgeworth David made the formal presentation of their paper describing their findings to the Royal Society of New South Wales on 5 October 1904 on the men's behalf.

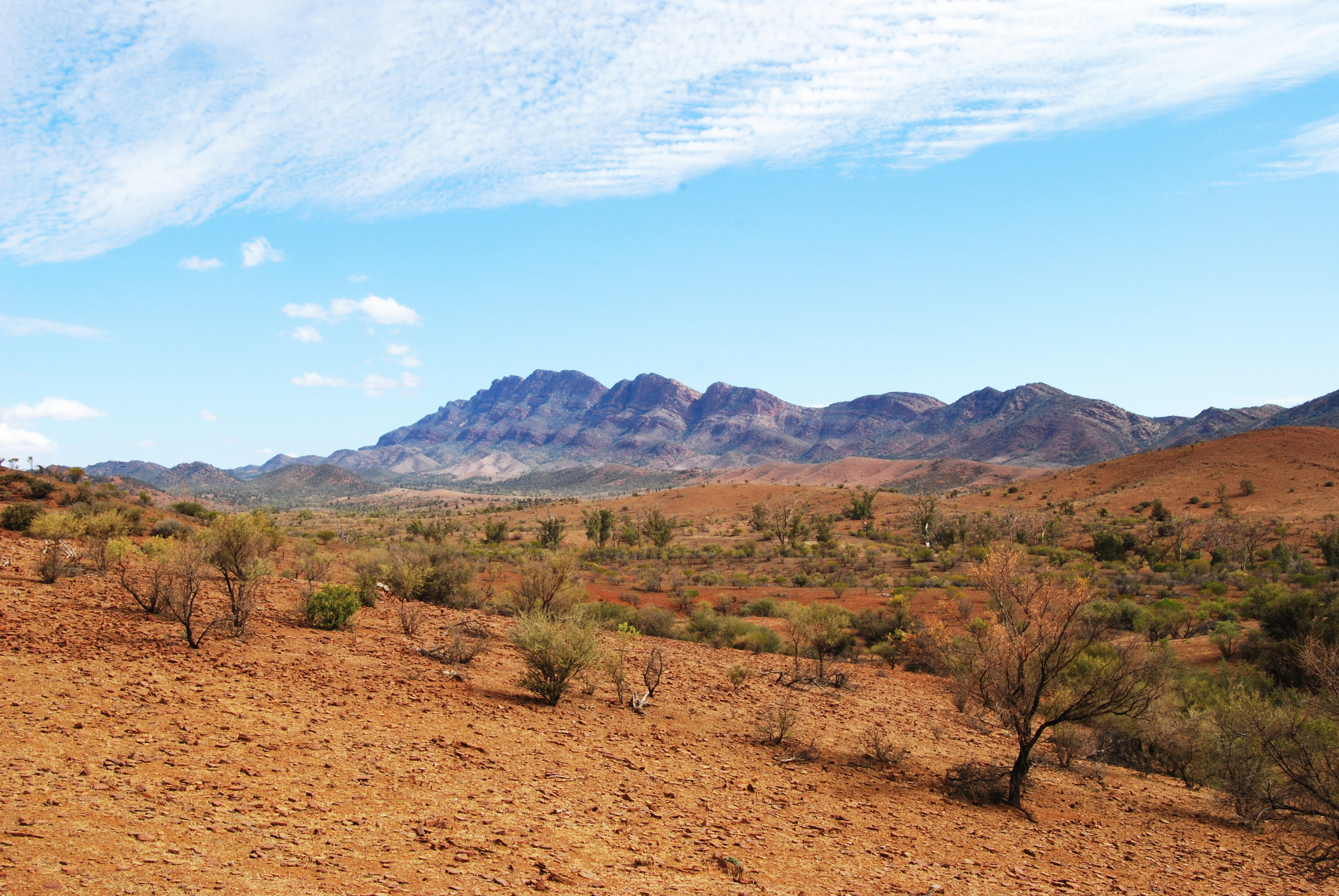
Arid land in the Flinders Ranges

In 1905 Mawson became a lecturer in petrology and mineralogy at the University of Adelaide. During this time, thanks to the free rail pass given to him by the government for the purpose of geological research, he travelled by train around the state of South Australia (SA). By 1907, he had been to Kangaroo Island, the Flinders Ranges, to the southern tips of the Yorke and Eyre Peninsulas, as well as an area between the small town in the far east of SA, Olary, and Broken Hill, over the border in New South Wales. He explored the Olary–Broken Hill area on horseback and by motorbike. He also accompanied groups of students on field trips, and had to plan transport and provisions for hot days and some very cold nights in the desert. He wrote extensive diaries detailing his trips in the semi-arid areas, which have been transcribed by volunteers at the South Australian Museum. In 1906, government geologist Henry Y. L. Brown concluded that Mawson was undertaking commercial activities in conjunction with his academic activities at Elder's Rock, and withdrew his rail pass for a while.

Mawson was always interested in commercial applications of geology. After the discovery of uranium materials at near Olary, a "uranium rush" followed, in order to extract the mineral for commercial applications, at that time. Commercial interest in uranium rose after Marie Curie's research and the application of radioactivity in medicine. Mawson exhibited a collection of radioactive minerals, including carnotite from Olary, at a meeting of the Royal Society of South Australia on 7 August 1906. On 4 September of that year, Mawson identified and first described the mineral davidite, which contains titanium and uranium, at the Olary site, which he named Radium Hill. The site was developed by the Radium Hill Company, but closed in 1914 with the start of World War I. Mawson maintained an interest in Radium Hill throughout his life, in particular davidite. It was the first major find of radioactive ore in Australia.

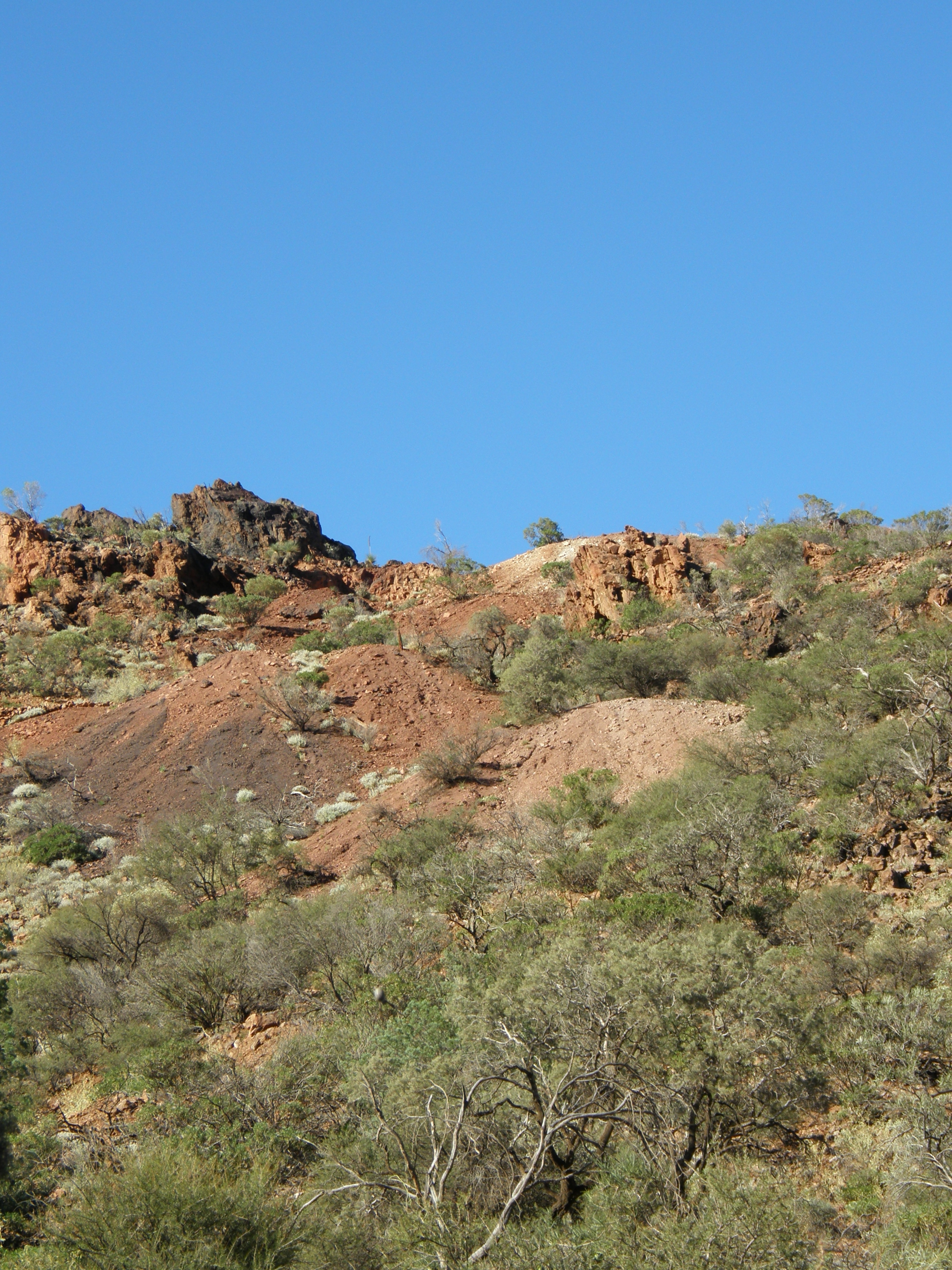
Radium Ridge mine (Mount Painter, No. 6 workings)

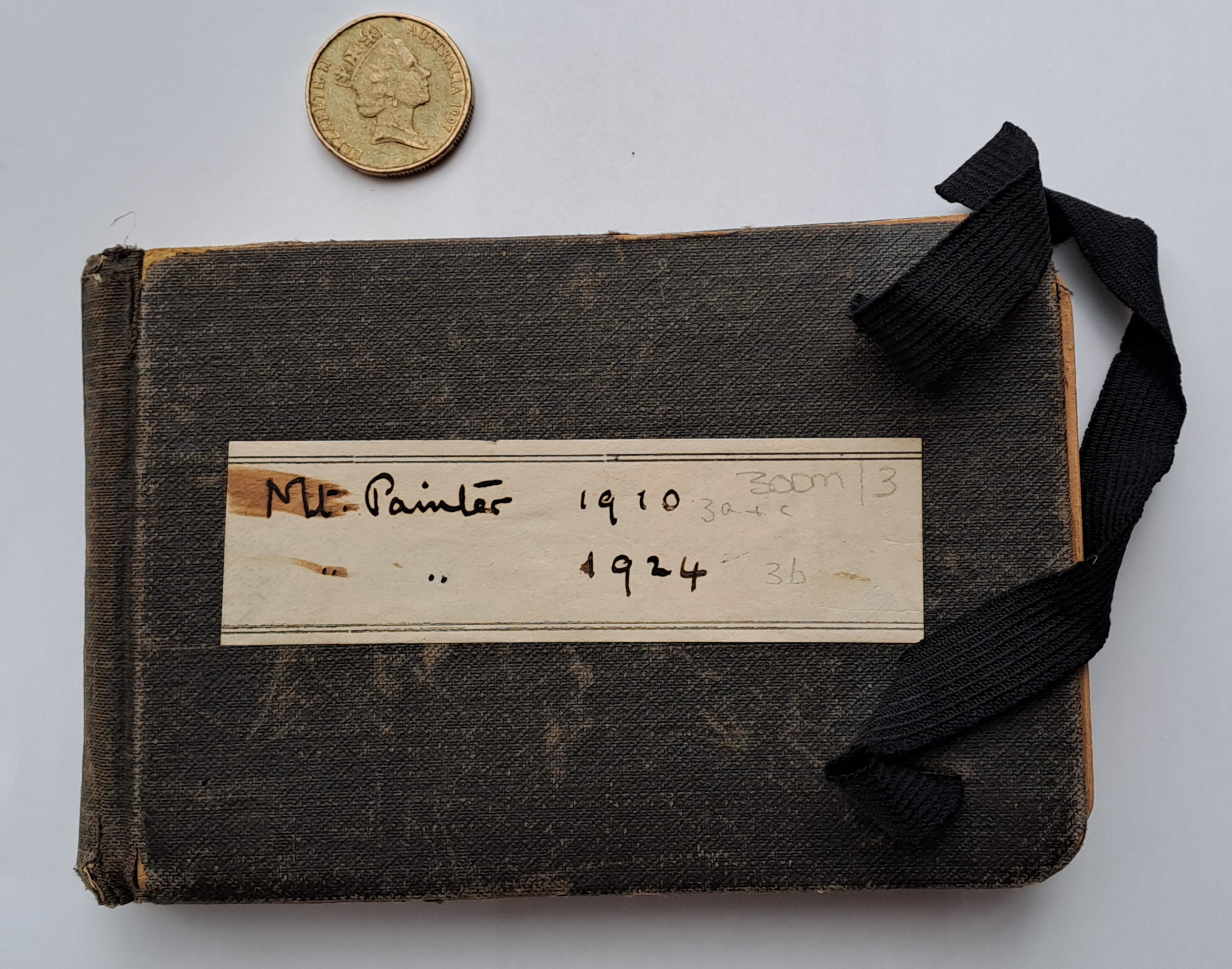
Front cover of one of Mawson's fieldwork diaries

After pastoralist and prospector W. B. Greenwood (Note: Note confusion between father (William Bentley) and son (Gordon Arthur) Greenwood that seems to occur in several sources.) sent rocks that he had found near Mount Painter, in the northern Flinders Ranges, in October/November 1910 for analysis, Mawson identified the mineral torbernite, a secondary mineral that occurs in uranium-bearing rocks. Greenwood had previously sent samples to the government in 1899, a year after radium had been discovered by Marie and Pierre Curie in France. However, government geologist Henry Y. L. Brown was away on leave when the specimens arrived, and they subsequently went missing. After Greenwood sent more samples in 1910, Brown was dismissive of their value, but Mawson, having recently visited Marie Curie in Paris, and been urged to look for radium, thought the samples were worth analysis. He used a gold-leaf electroscope given to him by Curie for the purpose (one of two she had made). Mawson visited the area and wrote a report which was published in newspapers in late November 1910. His diary of his trip to Mount Painter and Mount Gee dated October 1910 shows that his expedition members included the "well-known prospector still in the Govt Service" Harry Fabian, who met him at Mt Serle with camels; W. B. Greenwood; his son Gordon Arthur "Smiler" Greenwood; (Note: G. A. Greenwood, who worked with his father at Mt Painter, later (1940–1944) corresponded with Mawson in letters which are held at the State Library of South Australia.) and (for at least some of the trip) H. Y. L. Brown. The group travelled to Mt Painter, and visited a number of sites, including the Mount Rose Mine, Mueller Hill, Yankaninna, and the Wheal Turner Mine. In his overview written on the back of the diary, Mawson notes a number of different types of rock of the Cambrian and Precambrian before describing the torbanite, carnotite and uranium, as possibly "the most extensive uraniferous lode formation in the world". They also looked at corundum at Yudnamutana as well as a much larger strike of the same mineral on Mount Painter, which "may turn out enormous", and studied the rocks at Mt Gee and Radium Ridge. Mawson took numerous photographs of the sites and expedition members. Mawson became involved in the establishment of a development company, the Radium Extraction Company of South Australia Ltd (in which Greenwood also bought shares). He was optimistic about the value of the mine, but sold his shares in the company in 1911 in order to help finance the Australasian Antarctic Expedition, and in 1917 the company was liquidated after not achieving success. Mawson maintained a lifelong interest in uranium, which included the publication of a paper on uranium deposits in South Australia in 1944.

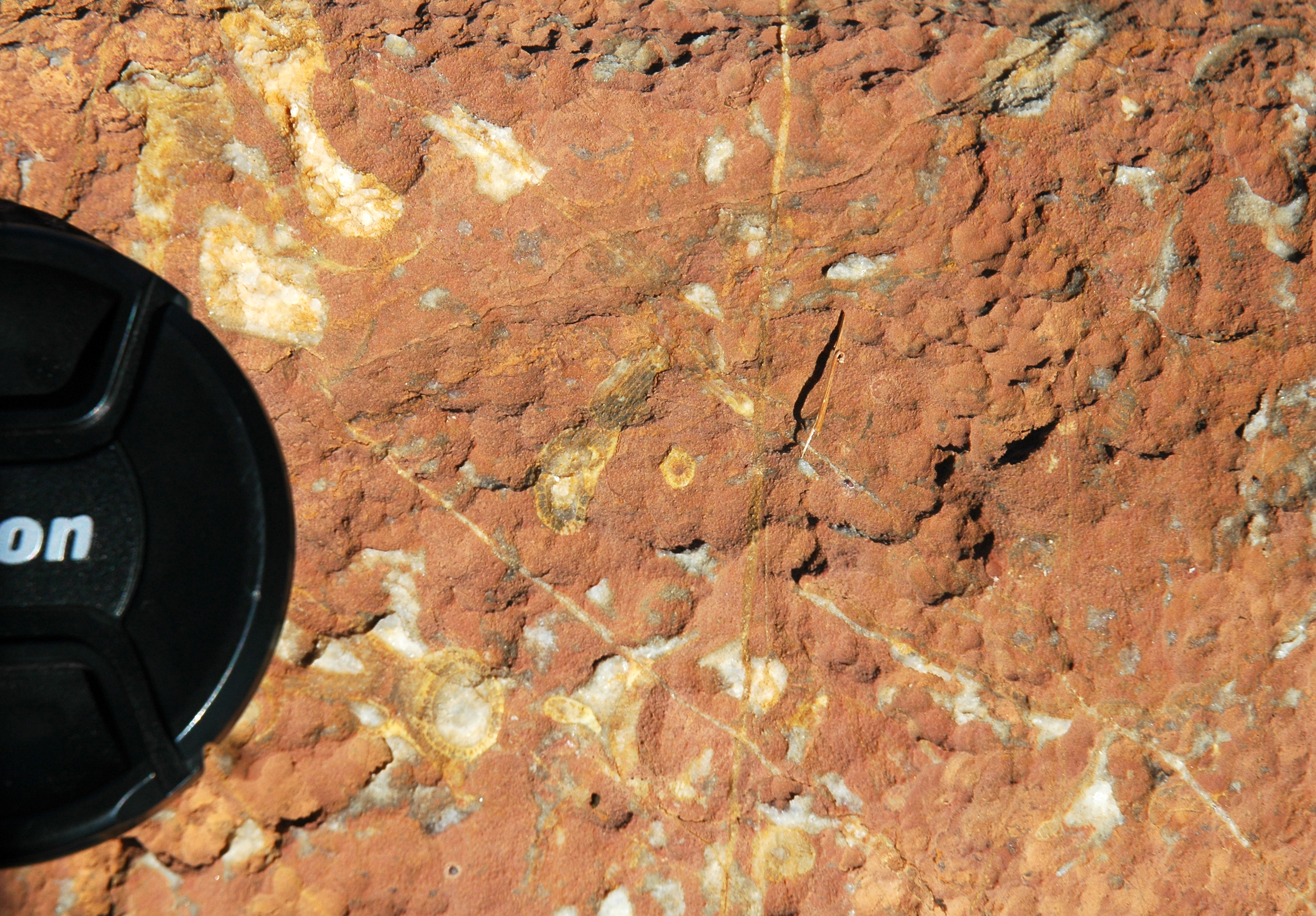
Archaeocyathan limestone at the Ajax Copper Mine

In March 1906, he wrote his first report on the geology of South Australia, and specifically of the Flinders Ranges, which he later revisited many times. The short handwritten report was submitted to the state government in March 1906, based on his first visit to the Flinders Ranges with Walter Howchin and Thomas Griffith Taylor in February 1906. It was titled "Notes on the Geological Features of the Beltana District", and was not published until 2007. (Note: The report is held in State Records of South Australia.) It described the geology of the area around Beltana, and the abandoned Ajax Copper Mine (now the heritage-listed and world-famous Ajax Mine Fossil Reef), located near Puttapa, a pastoral lease around 10 mi (16 km) north of Beltana. Mawson's report is a technical description of the mine and its activity, and also discusses the geology of the copper mineralisation and its relationship with the limestone bearing the Archaeocyatha (marine sponge) fossils (about which Taylor later wrote a major monograph). The report shows his abiding interest in the Cambrian right from the beginning of his career. He later returned to do major research on the Cambrian in the Flinders, building on Howchin's work, publishing important papers in the 1930s.

Also in 1906, while in Adelaide, he published a substantial and detailed study focused on the syenites of the Bowral Quarries in New South Wales. This was a follow-up to his earlier work with Taylor at Mittagong (1903). In January 1907, Mawson was responsible for organising the geological section of a meeting of the AAAS in Adelaide, and presented a paper about the Barrier Ranges, near Broken Hill. As part of the conference, as reported by Howchin, Mawson participated, along with Howchin, T. Griffith Taylor, Walter Woolnough and 16 others, in a five-day excursion dubbed "Scientific Trip of Governor Macquarie to Spencer Gulf". The ship visited Kangaroo Island as well as Neptune, Williams and Thistle Islands, proceeded to Port Lincoln and then returned to Port Adelaide after stopping off at Wedge Island. Later that year, Mawson visited the Australian Alps with T. Griffith Taylor and W. T. Quaife, who had accompanied him on his New Hebridean expedition two years prior.

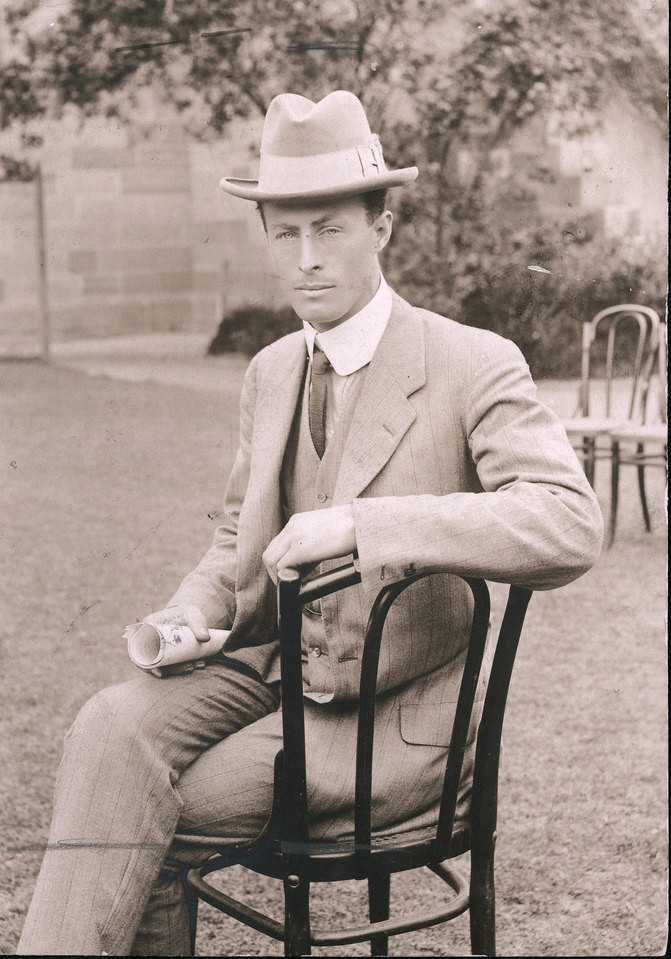
Mawson in 1914

Mawson's early work shows two major interests: an academic interest in ancient glacial rocks, and the commercial possibilities of mining certain minerals. The focus of his early geological work was the Precambrian rocks of the Barrier Ranges, which run from the northern Flinders Ranges in South Australia northwards through Broken Hill. There are several types of rock along the ranges, with varying degrees of mineralisation. He identified two groups: an older Archaean ("Willyama") Series, and a newer, Proterozoic ("Torrowangee") Series. His work in this area was reported in his 1909 D.Sc. thesis, and he subsequently published "Geological investigations in the Broken Hill area", in 1912, co-authored by English geologist Walter Howchin. His work on the glacial sediments of the Precambrian Age in SA and around Broken Hill led him to want to investigate the glaciers of Antarctica, and his later trips there, studying how they move and deposit sediment, increased his understanding of how the rocks formed in SA millions of years earlier.

Until 1913 he was largely occupied with Antarctic expeditions, and only returned to geological research in Australia in 1922. He did complete his doctorate after returning from Shackleton's Nimrod Expedition and completing his studies in the Broken Hill area, and was awarded a D.Sc. at the University of Adelaide in 1909 for his thesis about the geology of the Barrier Ranges.

=== World War I ===
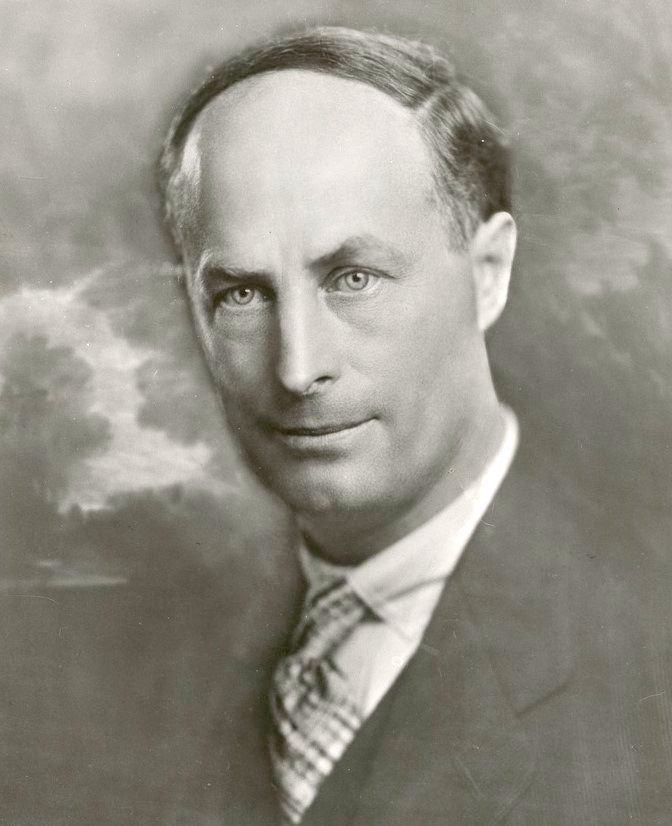
Mawson in 1926

After sitting out the first two years of the war, Mawson eventually served in a scientific capacity from May 1916 in the British Ministry of Munitions, first as embarkation officer for shipments of explosives and poison gas from Britain to Russia. He then worked for a Russian military agency, (Note: Source says "Russian Military Commission", but there does not seem to be any source substantiating this name.) reporting on British production of high explosives with the aim of increasing Russian production. After the Russian Revolution in 1917, he was transferred to the Commission Internationale de Ravitaillement, as a major.

=== Later career ===
Returning to the University of Adelaide in 1919, after the retirement of Howchin in 1920, Mawson was promoted to the professorship of geology and mineralogy in 1921, a position held until his retirement in 1952. He built an effective teaching and research department, with students always involved in field work.

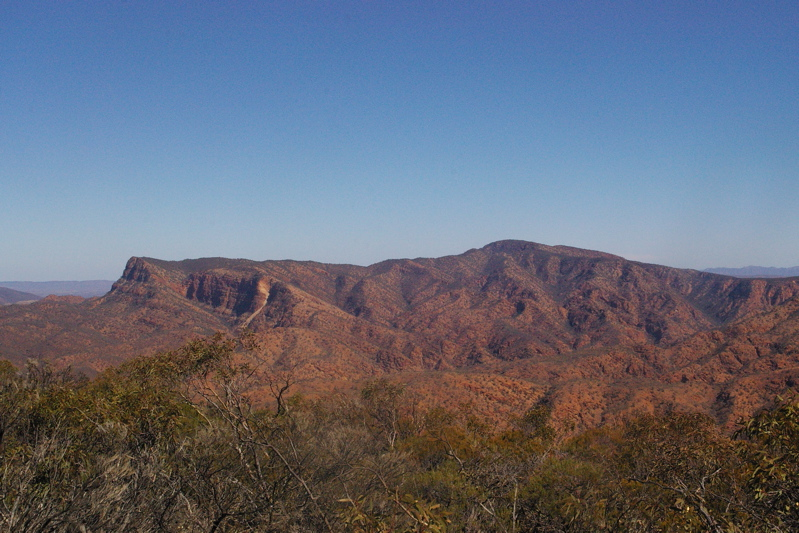
Mount McKinlay

Along with Cecil Madigan and their students, Mawson made significant contribution to the knowledge about the Cambrian. During these 30 years, much of his research was focused on the Adelaide Superbasin (formerly known as Adelaide Geosyncline and Adelaide Rift Complex) of Precambrian rocks, especially in the northern Flinders Ranges. He showed that glacial beds extended for 930 mi (1,500 km), and also that glacial conditions existed on and off throughout the Proterozoic period. During this time he did a lot of field work with students, sometimes using horse and cart or camels as transport. In August 1924, Mawson undertook fieldwork as part of his teaching and research programme in the northern Flinders Ranges, which led the discovery of an extensive Cambrian outcrop near Mt McKinlay in the Gammon Ranges.

His geological excursions and research into the Cambrian were interrupted by work and travel relating to another polar expedition, BANZARE, which took place from 1929 to 1931. After completing the work relating to BANZARE, Mawson once again took up and expanded his research into the Cambrian in the late 1930s, with some assistance from his students. He published studies in 1937, (Note: The Most Northerly Occurrence of Fossiliferous Cambrian Strata in South Australia.", read at the meeting of the Royal Society of South Australia in Adelaide on 14 October 1937.) 1938 and 1939, and a sketch map in 1942. In his studies, he included measured sections of parts of the Flinders Ranges, showing the Cambrian layers of rock.

He was also interested in the geochemistry of igneous and metamorphic rocks, the geological significance of algae, and other topics. His reputation meant that specialists around the world were happy to provide assistance in his descriptions of rocks and fossils which he had collected both in Australia and Antarctica.

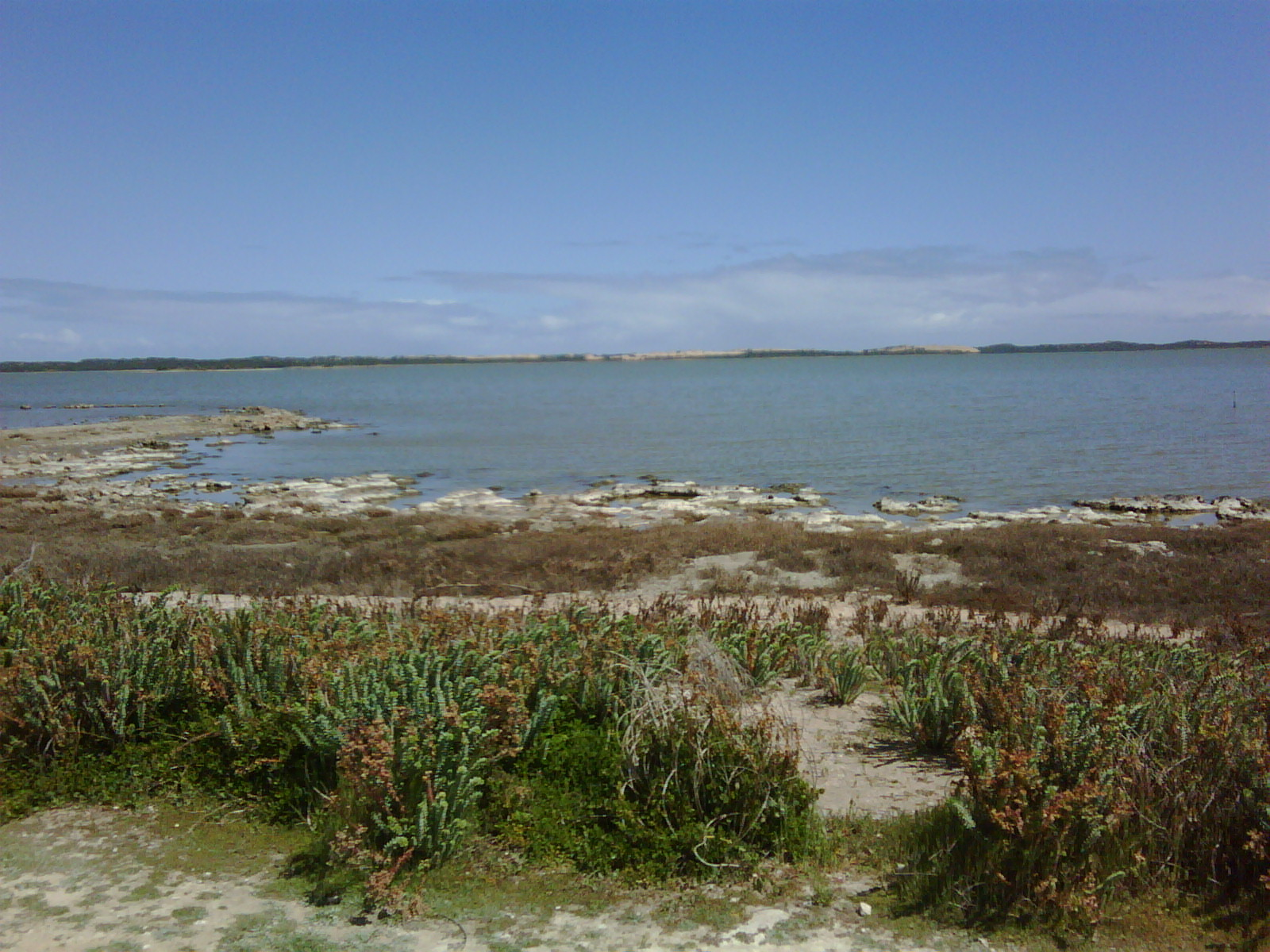
View across the Coorong near Salt Creek

Another area of interest for Mawson was petroleum geology, in particular researching coorongite, a substance first found in 1852 at Salt Creek on the Coorong, and other sapropelic deposits in the area. Some observers thought that this was formed by oil seepage, owing to its viscous nature and combustibility, but it was determined by scientists that coorongite had its origin in a type of alga called Botryococcus braunii. Mawson's diaries (Note: As transcribed at the South Australian Museum.) show that he did extensive field work in the Coorong and at Lake Albert (the first geologist to visit the latter site) in January 1938, February 1940 and January 1941, although only published one study in 1938. His personal correspondence also shows an interest in oil. Mawson's collection at the South Australian Museum also includes a sample of crude oil from Oil Creek, near Titusville, Pennsylvania, United States, although there is no indication of how he came by it. This oil, discovered by Edwin Drake, was the first discovery of unconventional crude oil in the world, and the first commercially successful oil well in the US when it opened in 1859. After his retirement from teaching in 1952, in 1954 Mawson was appointed as an inaugural director of the new oil company Santos (South Australia and Northern Territory Oil Search), but resigned very soon afterwards due to ill-health, becoming an honorary consultant to the company.

== Antarctic expeditions ==
=== Nimrod Expedition (1907–1909) ===
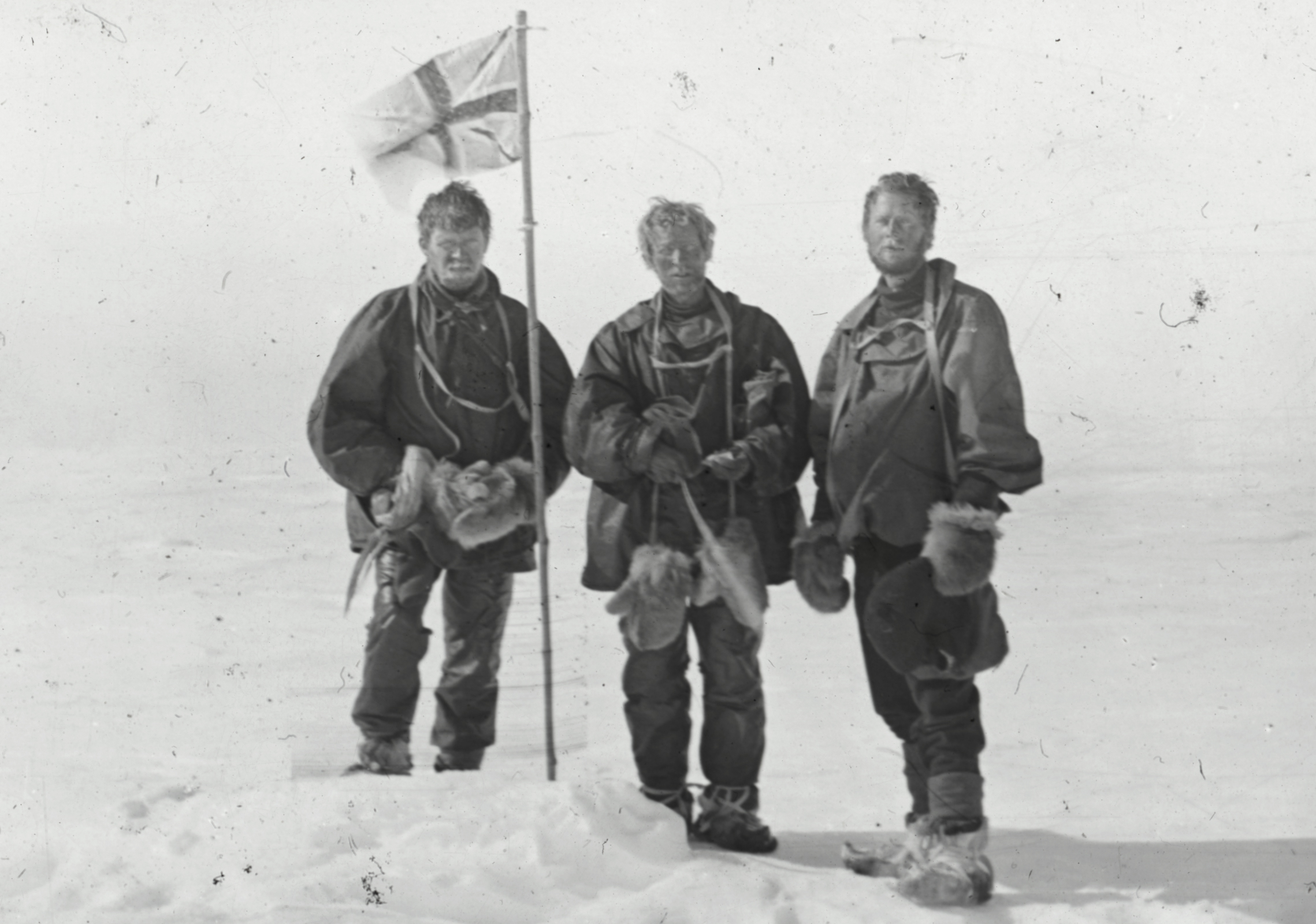
Alistair Mackay, Edgeworth David and Mawson raise the flag at the South magnetic pole on 16 January 1909.

While still undertaking his doctorate, Mawson joined Ernest Shackleton's Nimrod Expedition (1907–1909; also known as the Third British Antarctic Expedition) to the Antarctic, as surveyor, cartographer and magnetician. He was keen to learn more about glaciation and its effect on rocks, because his earlier studies in South Australia had looked at the largest Precambrian glacial deposits yet recorded anywhere. Originally intending to stay only for the duration of the ship's presence in the first summer, instead both he and his mentor, Edgeworth David, stayed an extra year. In doing so they became, in the company of Alistair Mackay and a support group of three men, the first to climb the summit of Mount Erebus (the second-highest volcanic peak in Antarctica, at 3,794 m [12,448 ft]) and to trek to the South magnetic pole locality, which at that time was over land. On the return journey to Nimrod, Mawson fell into a crevasse and had to be rescued.

During their stay, they also wrote, illustrated and printed the book Aurora Australis. Mawson contributed with the science fiction short story "Bathybia".

=== Australasian Antarctic Expedition (1911–1913) ===
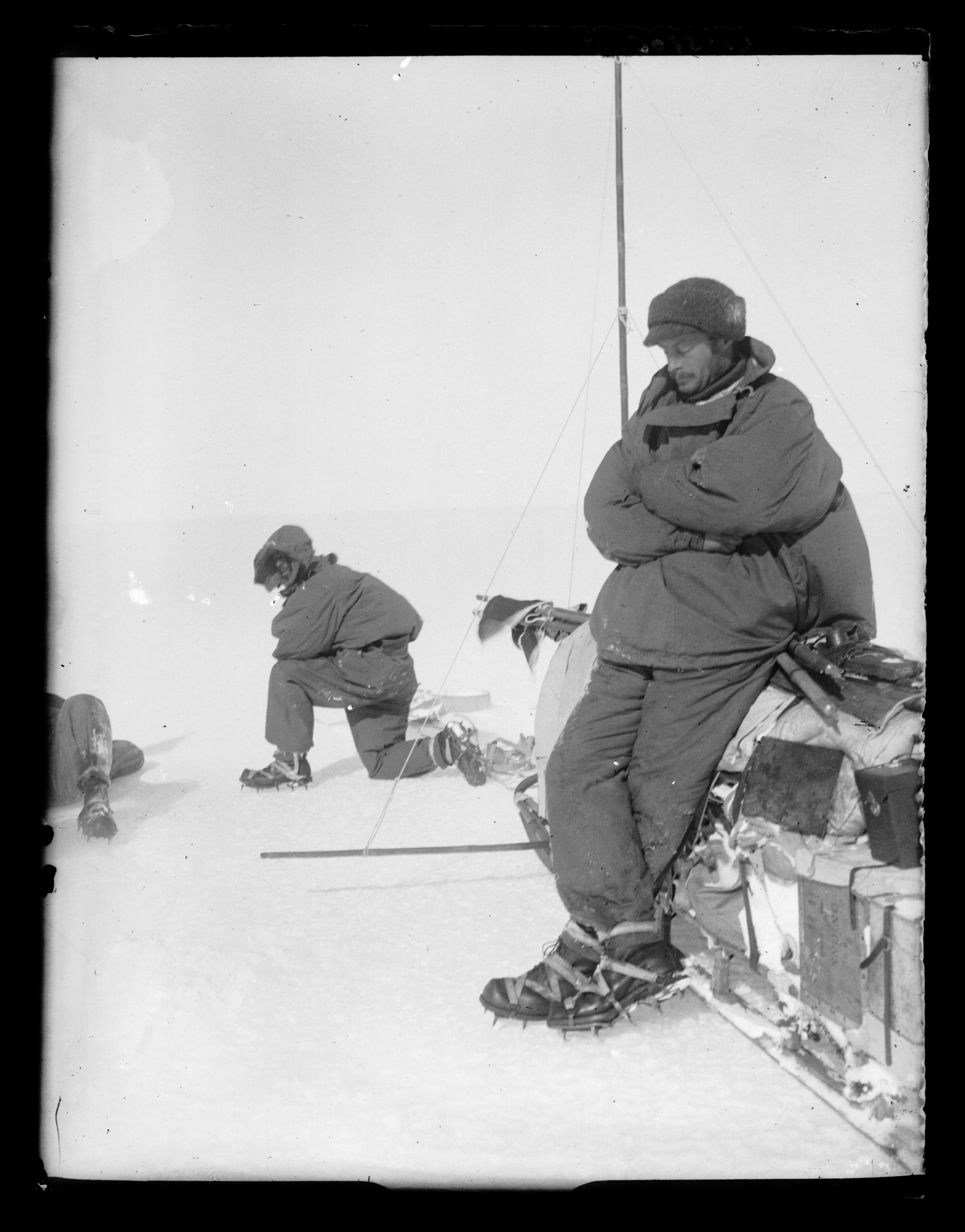
Mawson resting at the side of his sledge, Adélie Land, Antarctica, 1912

Mawson turned down an invitation to join Robert Falcon Scott's Terra Nova Expedition in 1910, as Scott showed no interest in Mawson doing scientific research on the expedition. Instead, Australian geologist Thomas Griffith Taylor went with Scott. Mawson chose to lead his own expedition, the Australasian Antarctic Expedition (AAE), to George V Land and Adélie Land, the sector of the Antarctic continent immediately south of Australia, which at the time was almost entirely unexplored. The objectives were to carry out geographical exploration and scientific studies, including a visit to the South magnetic pole. Mawson raised the necessary funds in a year, from British and Australian governments, and from commercial backers interested in mining and whaling. Over nearly three years, the group mapped the Antarctic coastline, explored other nearby locations such as the subantarctic Macquarie Island, as well as voyaging inland for over 500 km (310 mi), collecting geological and scientific data. Mawson had meant to return in February 1913, but owing to a series of mishaps during his Far Eastern Party expedition and the loss of his companions, missed the returning boat, and was forced to spend another year there.

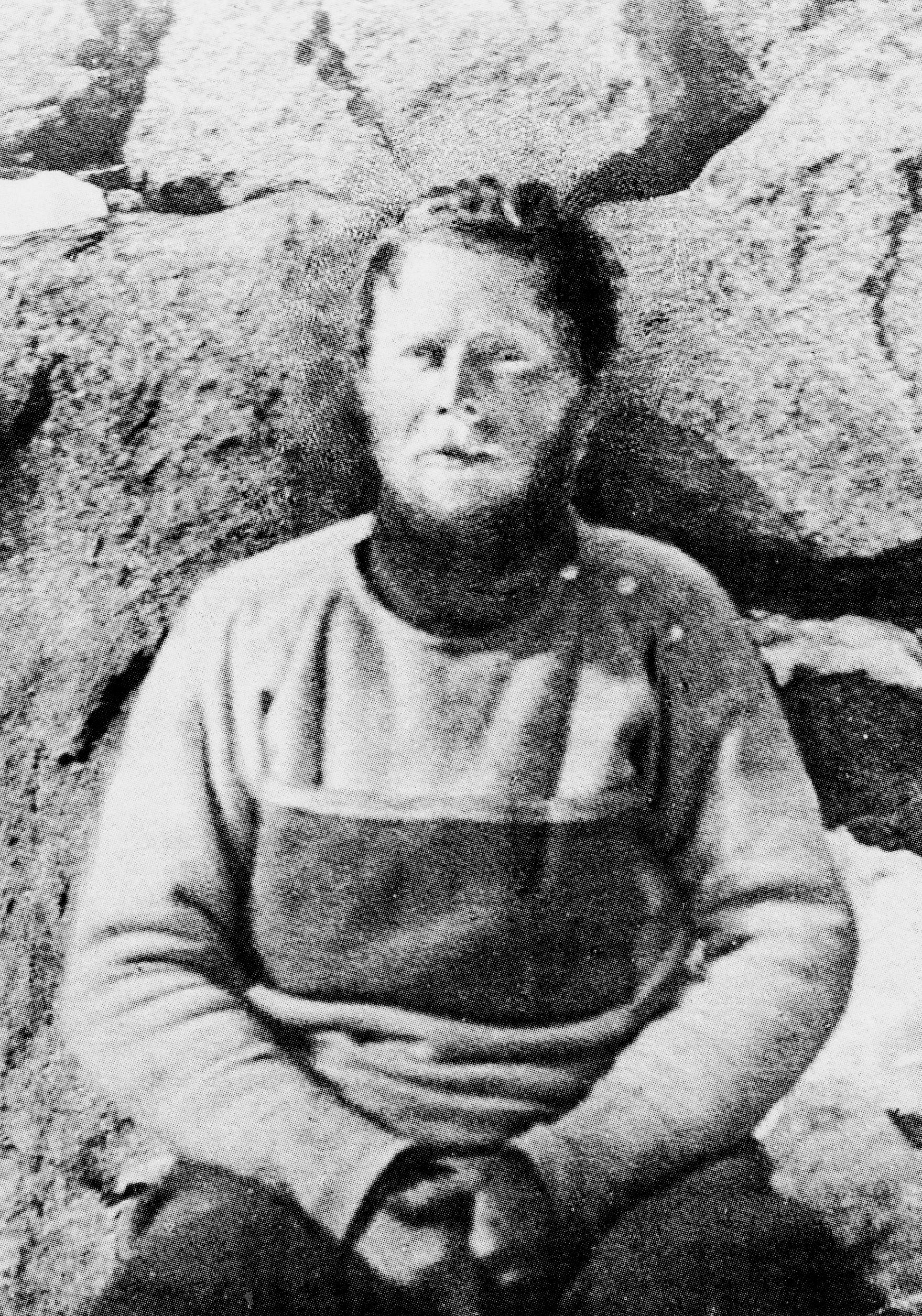
Mawson shortly after his return to Cape Denison, Feb. 1913

The expedition used the ship SY Aurora commanded by Captain John King Davis, who led an extensive programme of marine science from the ship. It departed from Hobart on 2 December 1911, landed at Cape Denison (named after Hugh Denison, a major backer of the expedition) on Commonwealth Bay on 8 January 1912, and established the Main Base. A second camp was located to the west on the ice shelf in Queen Mary Land. Cape Denison proved to be unrelentingly windy; the average wind speed for the entire year was about 50 mph (80 km/h), with some winds approaching 200 mph (320 km/h). They built a hut (now one of Mawson's Huts) on the rocky cape and wintered through nearly constant blizzards. In his book published after the expedition, The Home of the Blizzard (1915), Mawson talked of "Herculean gusts" on 24 May 1912, which he learned afterwards "approached two hundred miles per hour". These katabatic winds can reach around 300 km/h (190 mph), and led Mawson to dub Cape Denison "the windiest place on Earth".

Mawson wanted to do aerial exploration and brought the first "air tractor" to Antarctica. The aircraft, a Vickers R.E.P. Type Monoplane, was to be flown by Francis Howard Bickerton. When it was damaged in Australia shortly before the expedition departed, plans were changed, and it was to be used only as a tractor on skis. However, the engine did not operate well in the cold, and it was removed and returned to Vickers in England. The aircraft fuselage itself was abandoned. On 1 January 2009, fragments of it were rediscovered by the Mawson's Huts Foundation, which works on restoring and conserving the original huts.

Mawson's exploration program was carried out by five parties from the Main Base and two from the Western Base. Mawson himself was part of a three-man sledging team, the Far Eastern Party, with Xavier Mertz and Lieutenant Belgrave Ninnis, who headed east on 10 November 1912, to survey George V Land. After five weeks of excellent progress mapping the coastline and collecting geological samples, the party was crossing the Ninnis Glacier 480 km (300 mi) east of the main base. Mertz was skiing and Mawson was on his sledge with his weight dispersed, but Ninnis was jogging beside the second sled. Ninnis fell through a crevasse, and his body weight is likely to have breached the snow bridge covering it. The six best dogs, most of the party's rations, their tent and other essential supplies disappeared into the massive crevasse. Mertz and Mawson spotted one dead dog and one injured one on a ledge 165 feet (50 m) below them, but Ninnis was never seen again.

After a brief service, Mawson and Mertz turned back immediately. They had one week's provisions for two men and no dog food, but plenty of fuel and a Primus stove. Their lack of provisions forced them to use their remaining sledge dogs to feed the other dogs and themselves: There was a quick deterioration in the men's physical condition during this journey. Both men suffered dizziness; nausea; abdominal pain; irrationality; mucosal fissuring; skin, hair and nail loss; and the yellowing of eyes and skin. Mertz began to deteriorate rapidly, with diarrhoea and madness, eventually falling into a coma and dying on 8 January 1913. It was unknown at the time that high levels of vitamin A are toxic to humans, causing liver damage, and that husky liver contains extremely high levels of vitamin A. Mawson himself also became very ill, with the soles of his feet becoming detached.

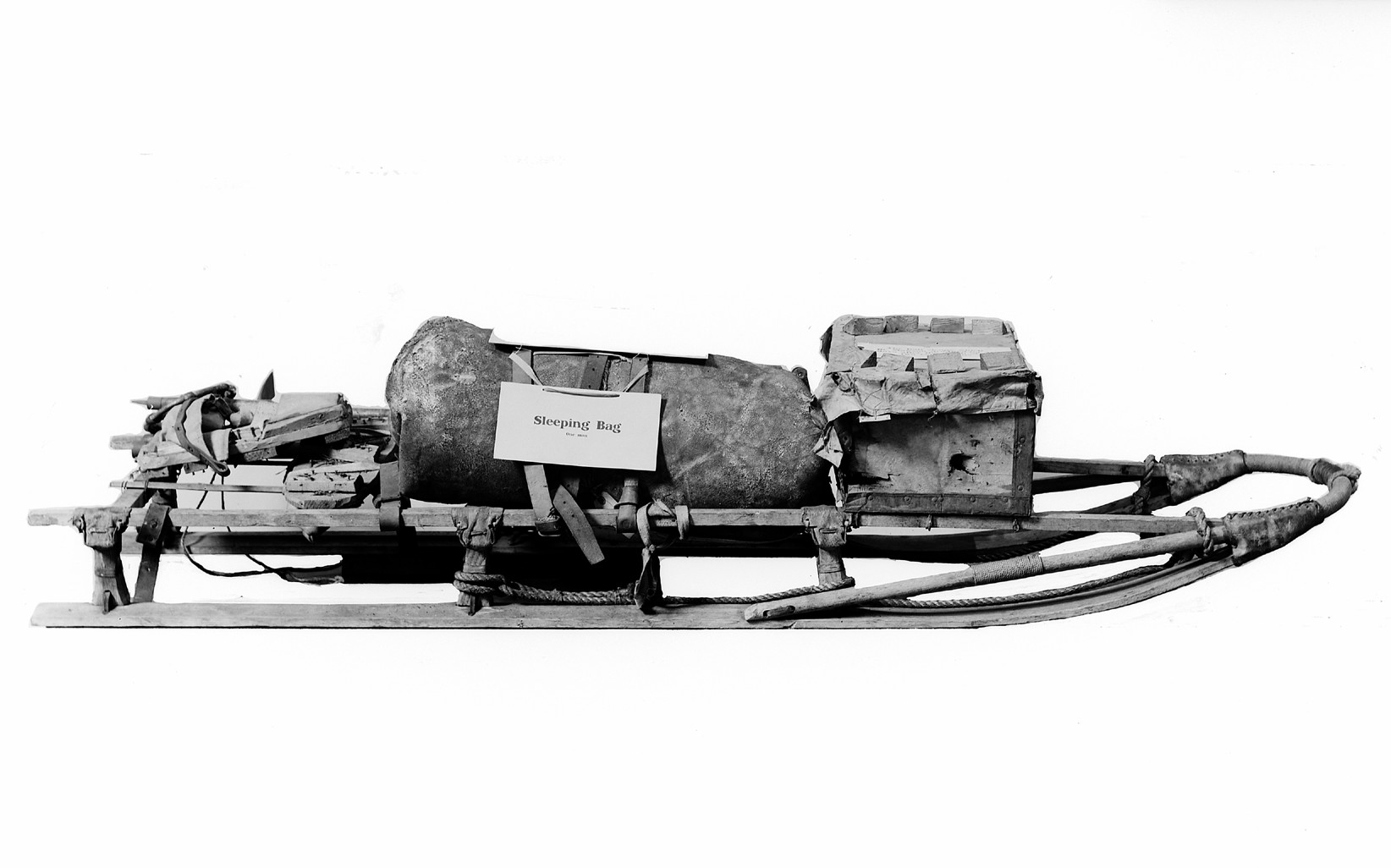
The remaining half of Mawson's sledge

Mawson cut his remaining sledge in half to make it lighter and easier to single man-haul, taking on the barest minimum equipment with him. The half sledge is displayed in the South Australian Museum.

He continued the final 160 kilometres (99 mi) alone and slowly, back to Main Base. When he finally made it back to Cape Denison, the ship Aurora had left only a few hours before. It was recalled by wireless communication, only to have bad weather thwart the rescue effort. Mawson and six men who had remained behind to look for him wintered a second year until December 1913. In Mawson's book Home of the Blizzard, he describes his experiences. His party, and those at the Western Base, had explored large areas of the Antarctic coast, describing its geology, biology and meteorology, and more closely defining the location of the South magnetic pole. They had covered around 4,000 mi (6,400 km).

Upon his return Mawson gave public lectures, showing photographs and relating stories of the AAE, including at Adelaide Town Hall on 9 September 1914. He also edited the 22 volumes of the A.A.E. Scientific Reports, the publication of which was finally completed in 1947.

The Australian Government has published a website called "Home of the Blizzard: The Australasian Antarctic Experience".

=== BANZARE (1929–31) ===
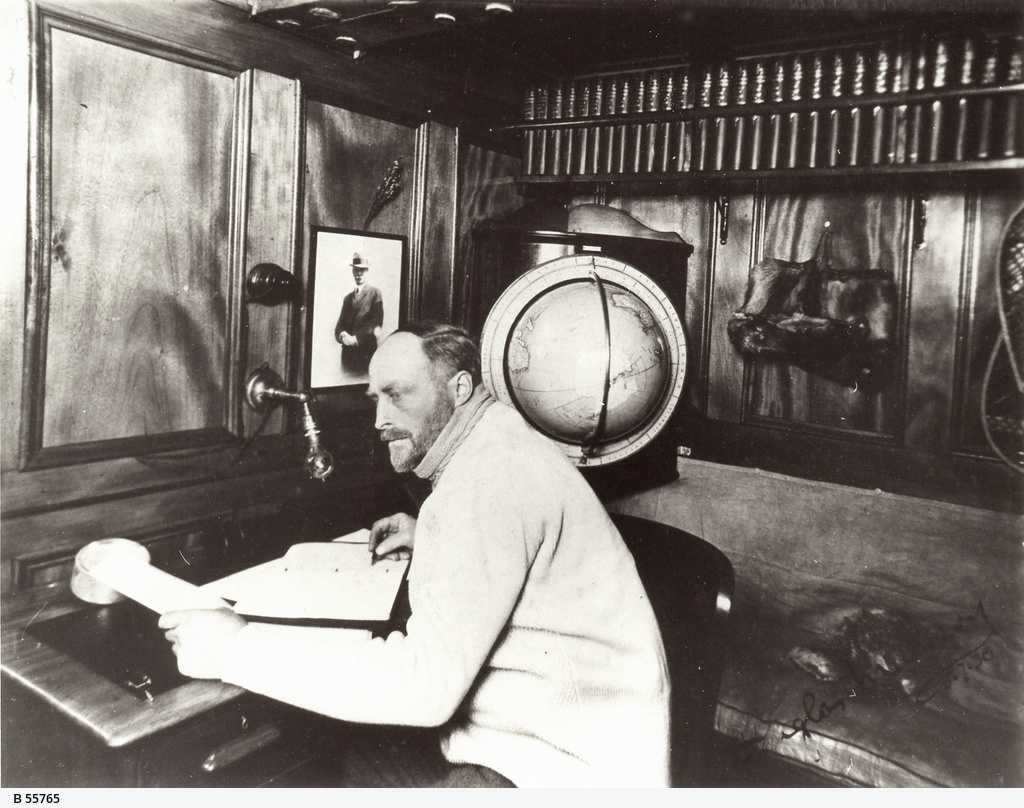
Mawson in his cabin on board the Discovery during the B.A.N.Z. Antarctic Research Expedition in 1929

With the support of both the Australian National Research Council and the Australian Government, resulting from the Imperial Conference 1926, Mawson led the British Australian and New Zealand Antarctic Research Expedition (BANZARE) of 1929–30 and 1930–31. This expedition used the ship Discovery and did not establish land bases, instead focusing on data relating to geology, magnetism, zoology and botany. BANZARE resulted in the formation of the Australian Antarctic Territory in 1936, by the enactment of the Australian Antarctic Territory Acceptance Act 1933.

The expedition also carried out extensive work in marine science, with the examination and analysis of specimens carried out over the following 50 years by specialists all over the world, culminating in the 13-volume B.A.N.Z.A.R.E. Scientific Reports, with the last only published in 1975. The narrative of the BANZARE was written by Archibald Grenfell Price, working from Mawson's papers, and was published commercially by Angus & Robertson as The winning of Australian Antarctica; Mawson's B.A.N.Z.A.R.E. voyages, 1929-31 in 1962.

== Other roles and activities ==
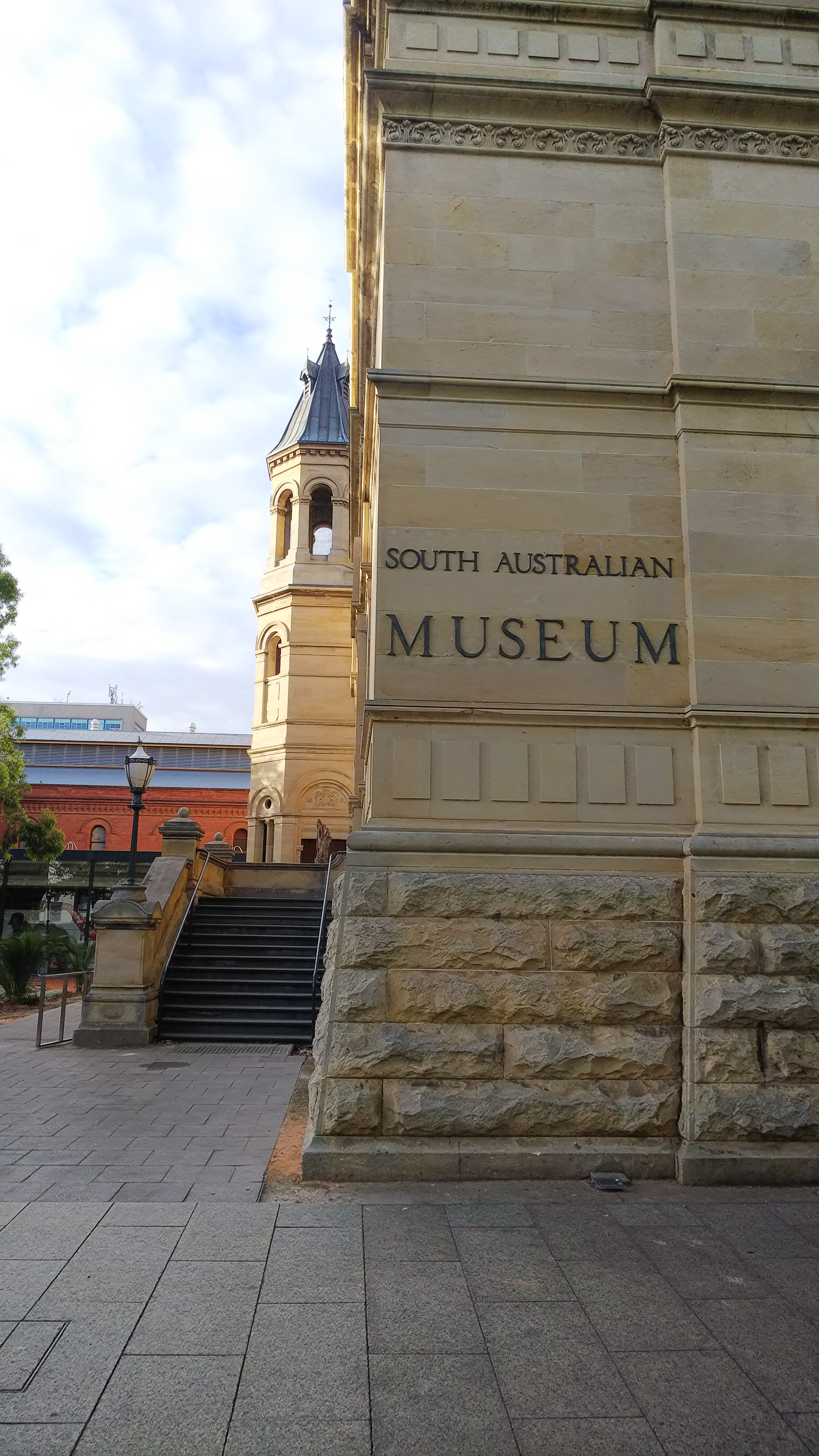
South Australian Museum

Mawson was Honorary Curator of Minerals for the South Australian Museum from 1907 to 1958, and also chair of the South Australian Museum Board of Governors from 1951 to 1958.

In 1915, he represented the University of Adelaide at a conference convened by prime minister Billy Hughes in order to establish the Advisory Council of Science and Industry, which was the predecessor of the Commonwealth Scientific and Industrial Research Organisation (CSIRO). In early 1916 Mawson participated in the first executive meetings of the new body, in which its charter and operational procedures were established.

On 21 August 1919, Mawson was a founding member, representing the science of geography, of the Australasian Research Council, based in Sydney. The council was formalised by the Australasian Association for the Advancement of Science (AAAS) and renamed the Australian National Research Council (ANRC) in July 1921, and eventually dissolved in 1955, its functions taken over by the Australian Academy of Science. He was a petitioner for the academy in 1953, a founding fellow 1954–1958, and council member from 1954.

From the end of World War I until 1923, he was a committee member of the Australian War Museum (later the Australian War Memorial).

He was a member of the council, and later president of the Royal Geographical Society of South Australia from 1924 to 1925.

In 1920 he was elected president of Section E (Geology) the Australasian Association for the Advancement of Science. From 1932 to 1937 he was president of the association, by then renamed Australian and New Zealand Association for the Advancement of Science (ANZAAS).

In 1924-1925 and again in 1945 Mawson was president of the Royal Society of South Australia.

In 1939 he became a foreign member of the Swedish Society for Anthropology and Geography.

After World War II ended in 1945, Mawson promoted the Australian National Antarctic Research Expeditions, and was a member of the Australian Antarctic Executive Planning Committee until his death.

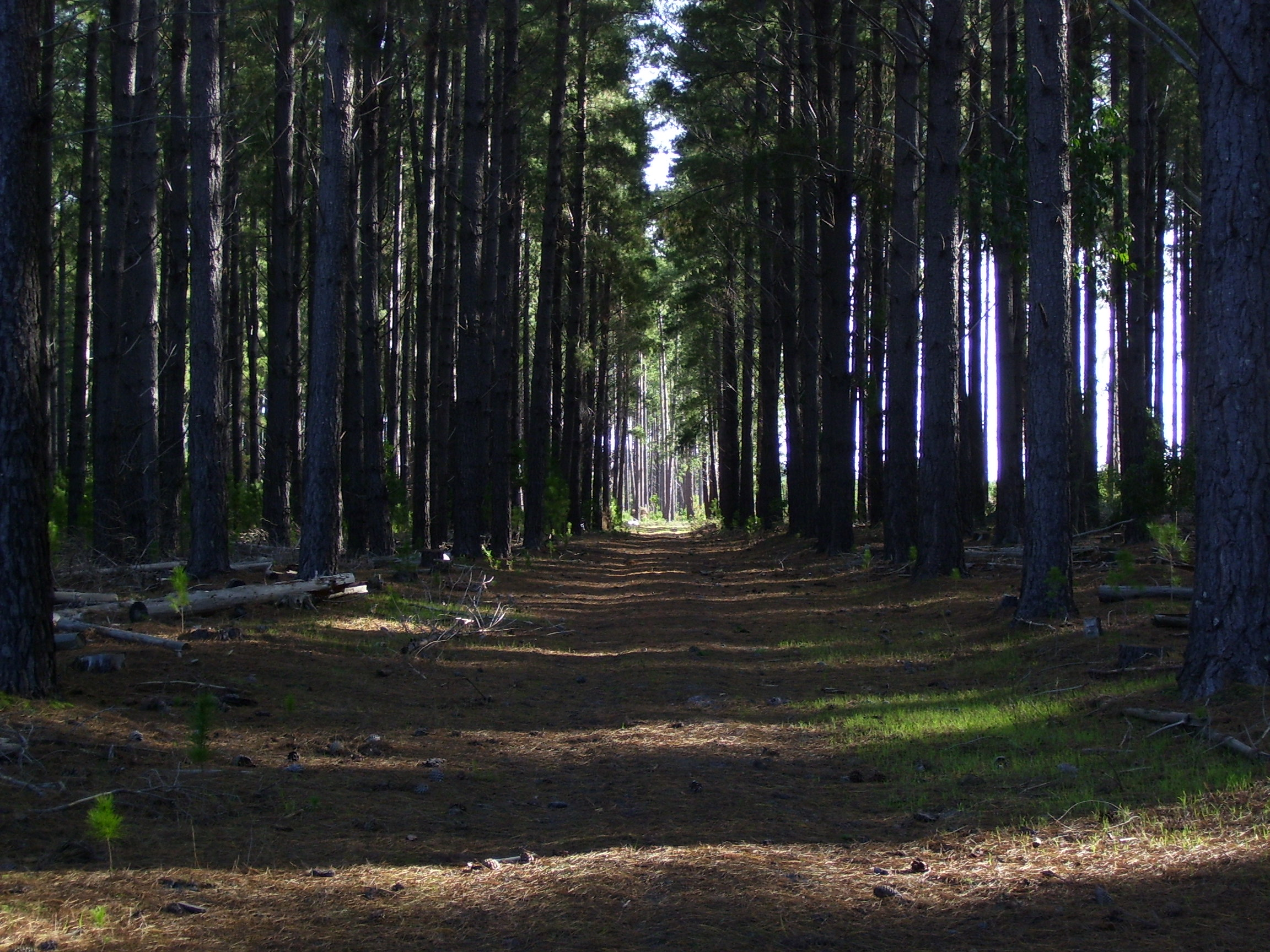
Kuitpo Forest, near Meadows

His other interests included conservation, farming and forestry. His wife wrote that he was happiest planting trees. Along with artist Hans Heysen, he was in 1920 a founding member of the South Australian Forest League, which was dedicated to protecting forests and valuable trees, and encouraging the planting of native trees. Mawson owned and worked a 1,200-acre (490 ha) farm called "Harewood" at Meadows, and was a founding director of S.A. Hardwoods Pty Ltd. He established a mill near Kuitpo Forest. A painting by artist Sam Leach of the farm, based on his childhood memories and assisted by AI, was a finalist in the Wynne Prize in 2022.

He also advocated for decimalisation and supported strict regulation of the whaling industry. When he returned from Antarctica in 1914, Mawson was determined to have Macquarie Island proclaimed a sanctuary, and this was achieved in 1916.

== Honours ==
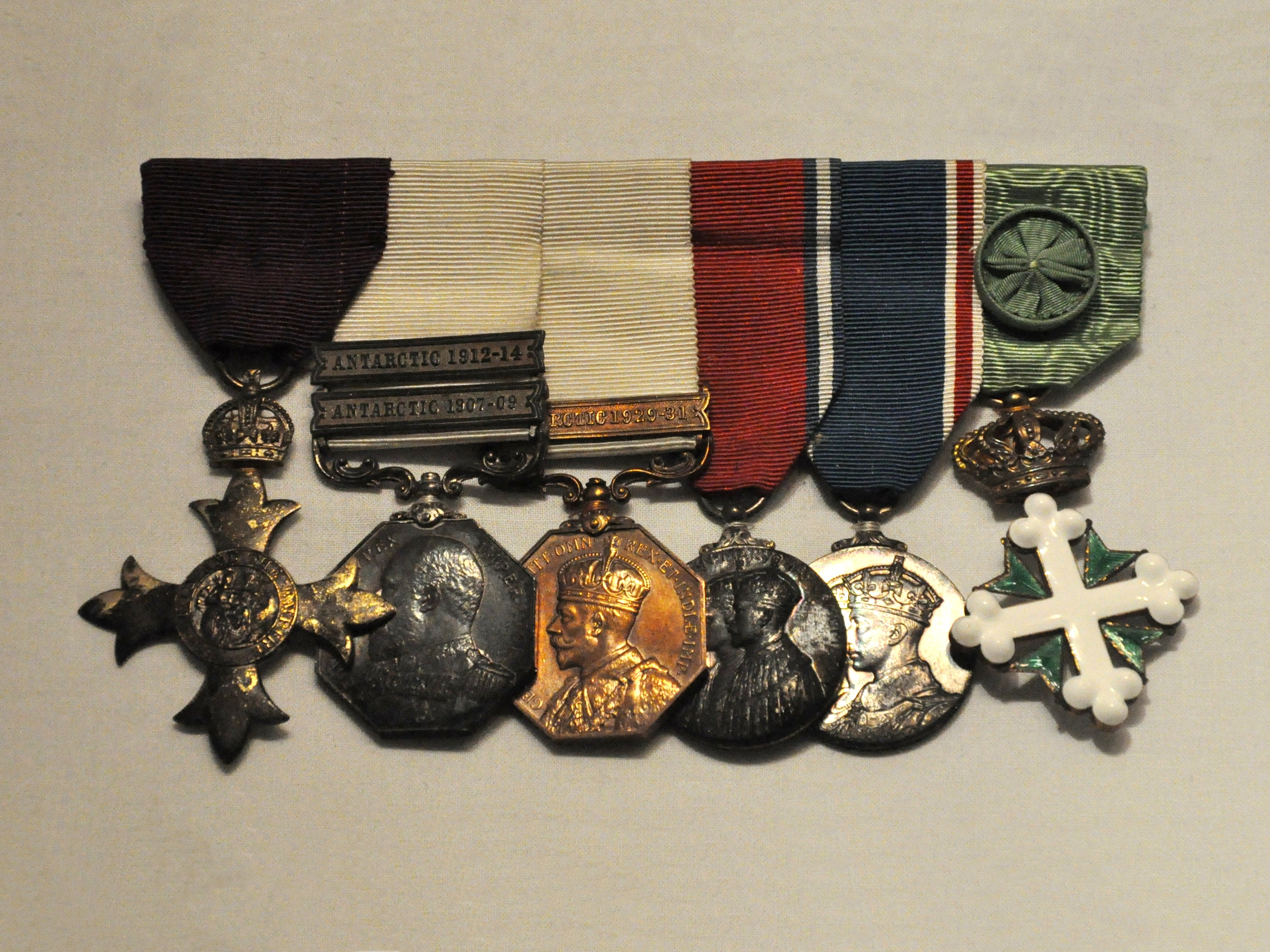
Mawson's medals held by the South Australian Museum: OBE; Polar Medal (silver); Polar Medal (bronze); Silver Jubilee Medal 1935; Coronation Medal 1937; Commander of the Order of the Crown of Italy

Caricature by Sir David Low

In 1914, Mawson was knighted.

He was made a fellow of the Royal Society (FRS) in 1923, and was a foundation Fellow of the Australian Academy of Science. He was made a life fellow of the Royal Geographical Society in 1913.

Other recognition and awards included:

- 1908: Antarctic Medal of the Royal Geographical Society
- 1909: Polar Medal (Silver), for the Nimrod expedition
- 1914: Polar Medal (Silver), for his Australian Expedition
- 1915: Founder's Medal of the Royal Geographical Society
- 1915: Helen Culver Gold Medal of the Chicago Geographical Society
- 1915: Silver Wolf Award of the Scouts Association
- 1916: David Livingstone Centenary Medal of the American Geographical Society
- 1919: Bigsby Medal of the Geological Society of London
- 1919: Officer of the Order of St Maurice and Lazarus of Italy
- 1920: Officer of the Order of the British Empire (OBE)
- 1923: Commander of the Order of the Crown of Italy
- 1927: Gold Medal for Oceanographical Research, Société de Géographie in Paris
- 1928: Gustav Nachtigal Medal, Gesellschaft für Erdkunde zu Berlin, Germany
- 1930: Mueller Medal of the Australian and New Zealand Association for the Advancement of Science (ANZAAS)
- 1931: Verco Medal of the Royal Society of South Australia
- 1931: Polar Medal (Bronze)
- 1935: King George V Silver Jubilee Medal
- 1936: Clarke Medal of the Royal Society of New South Wales
- 1937: King George VI Coronation Medal
- 1950: John Lewis Gold Medal, Royal Geographical Society of South Australia
- 1950: Gold Medal, Royal Society of South Australia
- 1952: Doctor of Science (DSc) honoris causa, University of Sydney
- 1953: Queen Elizabeth II Coronation Medal
- 1954: Fellow of the Australian Academy of Science

== Personal life ==
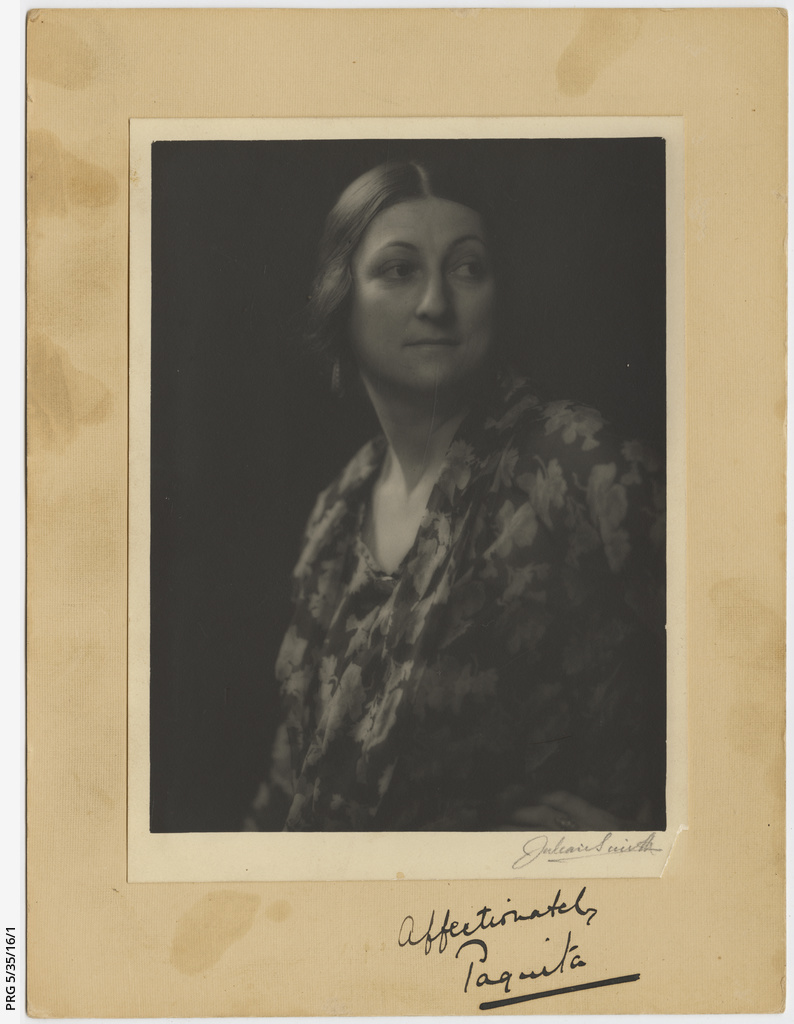
Paquita Mawson, c. 1935 (photo by Julian Smith; SLSA)

Mawson married Francisca Adriana (Paquita) Delprat (1891–1974) on 31 March 1914 at Holy Trinity Church of England, Balaclava, Melbourne, in an elaborate wedding. Captain John King Davis, who had captained Aurora and served as second-in-charge of the AAE, served as best man. She was the daughter of the Dutch-born metallurgist and general manager of BHP, G. D. Delprat, whom Mawson had met during his time in Broken Hill. They had met when she was 17, not long after Mawson's return from the Nimrod Expedition in 1909. They got engaged before Mawson left for the Australasian Antarctic Expedition in 1911. A series of letters written by both of them between 1911 and 1914 was published in 2005 as This Everlasting Silence: The Love Letters of Paquita Delprat and Sir Douglas Mawson, 1911-1914, introduced and annotated by Nancy Robinson Flannery.

Their first daughter, Patricia Marietje Thomas, later a notable parasitologist, was born in 1915. The family moved into an apartment in the recently-completed Ruthven Mansions in Pulteney Street, Adelaide, which was their first home together. However, Douglas was called to do war service in England, so they were only there for around a year. Paquita and Patricia went to stay with Mrs Delprat in Melbourne for some time, before Paquita, too, went to assist Mawson in his wartime role at the Ministry of Munitions in England, leaving Pat with her mother. Their second child, Jessica Paquita "Quita" Mawson (1917–2004; married name McEwin), who became a bacteriologist, was born in London.

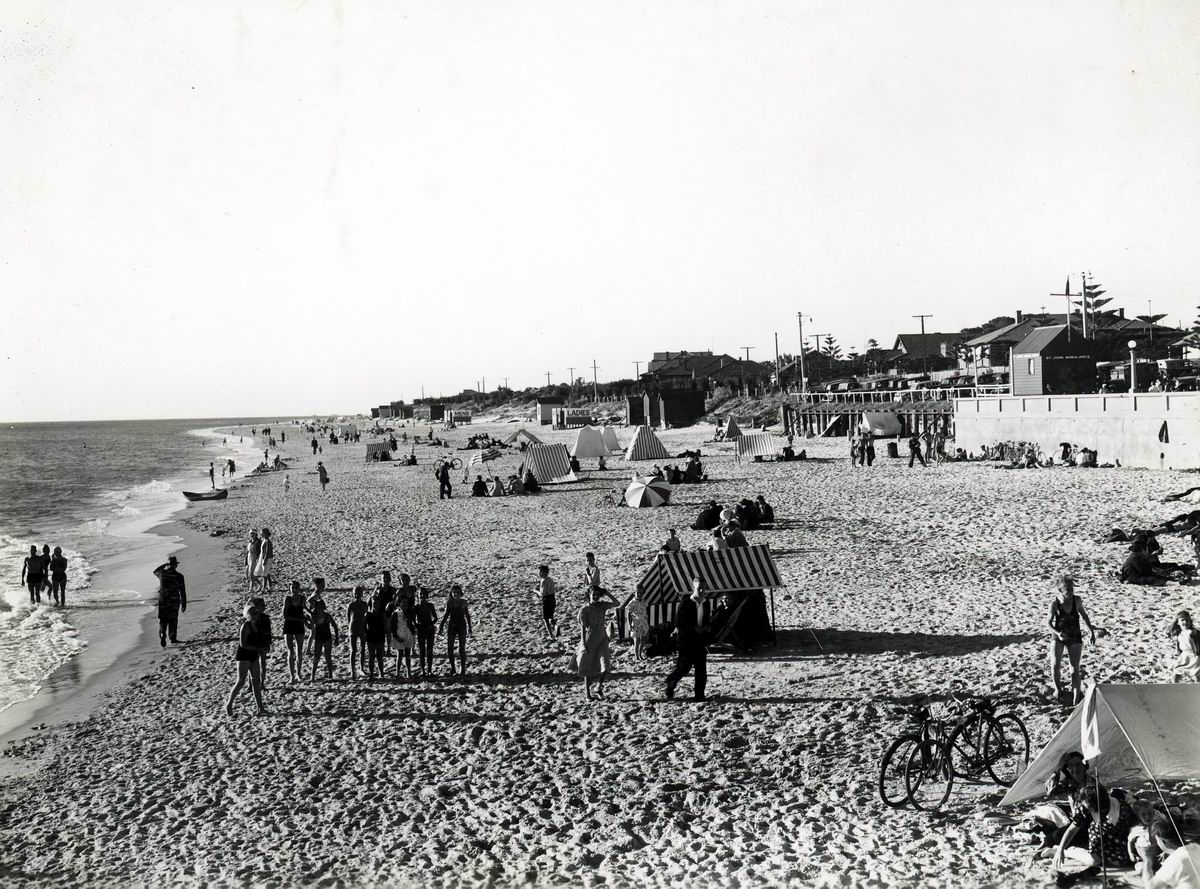
Brighton beach, 1930s

In 1920 the Mawsons moved into their new home, "Jerbii" at 44 King Street, Brighton, built on land owned by Paquita's parents and given to Douglas and Paquita as a wedding present. They had previously rented a home on the South Esplanade while it was being built, after returning from England after World War I. They lived in Brighton until 1958, when Douglas died.

Paquita worked for the Mothers' and Babies' Health Association, for which she was president for nine years, and the Australian Red Cross Society. Like her husband, she was prominent in Adelaide's social and cultural life, and wrote two books: A Vision of Steel, a biography of her father G. D. Delprat published in 1958, and Mawson of the Antarctic, about her husband, published in 1964. She too was awarded an OBE, and after Mawson's knighthood, became Lady Mawson.

During his time based in England in 1916 when working for the War Office, Mawson established an extremely close personal relationship with Kathleen Scott, the widow of polar explorer Robert Falcon Scott. Historian David Day, in his 2013 work Flaws in the Ice: In Search of Douglas Mawson, suggested that the pair had conducted an affair in 1916 in Sandwich, Kent. However, this is refuted by historian Tom Griffiths, who says that they were united in grief at the time, and found solace in each other, perhaps an emotional and spiritual connection. The claim is also rejected by Mawson's great-granddaughter Emma McEwin, who has read Kathleen Scott's diaries and written a book about her great-grandparents' marriage, and adventurer Tim Jarvis.

Mawson's elder brother William studied medicine at Sydney university and became a GP in Campbelltown. He cared for their parents in their later years, with their father Robert dying in 1912 aged 58 and their mother Margaret at the same age in 1917. Mawson Park in Campbelltown was named after William in 1938. William died in 1939.

== Later life and death ==
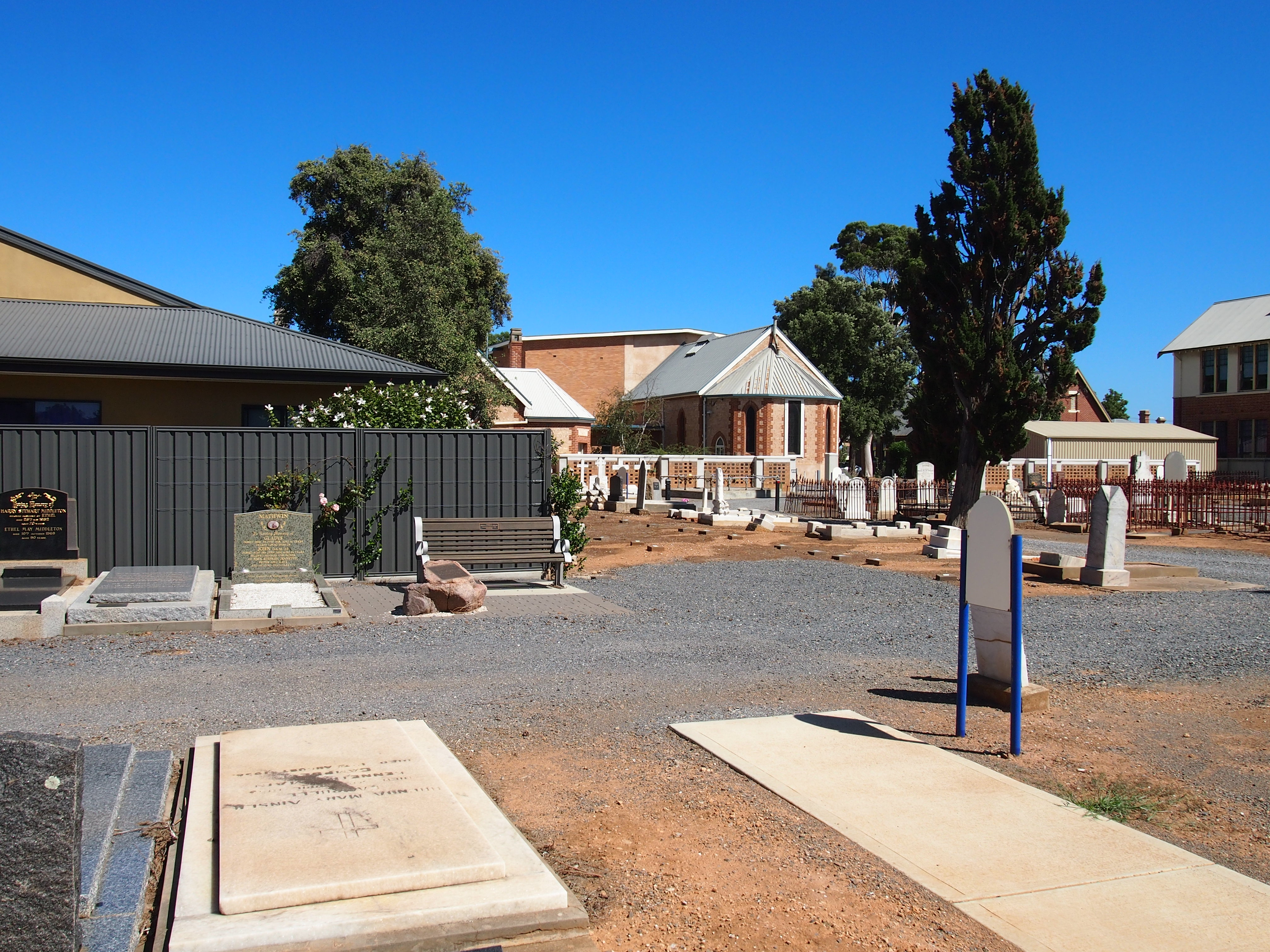
Sir Douglas Mawson's grave at St Jude's, at Brighton, South Australia

Upon his retirement from teaching in 1952 he was made an emeritus professor of the University of Adelaide. The university published Sir Douglas Mawson Anniversary Volume: Contributions to geology in honour of Sir Douglas Mawson's 70th birthday anniversary.

On 12 March 1958, Mawson paid a visit to the Soviet Antarctic ship Cooperatzia (aka Cooperatsiya and Kooperatsiya), and spent several hours talking to Soviet scientific leader Alexey Tryoshnikov. The ship's visit was an occasion for helping to develop further friendly relations between Australian and Soviet scientists, and the American scientist G. D. Cartwright was also on board.

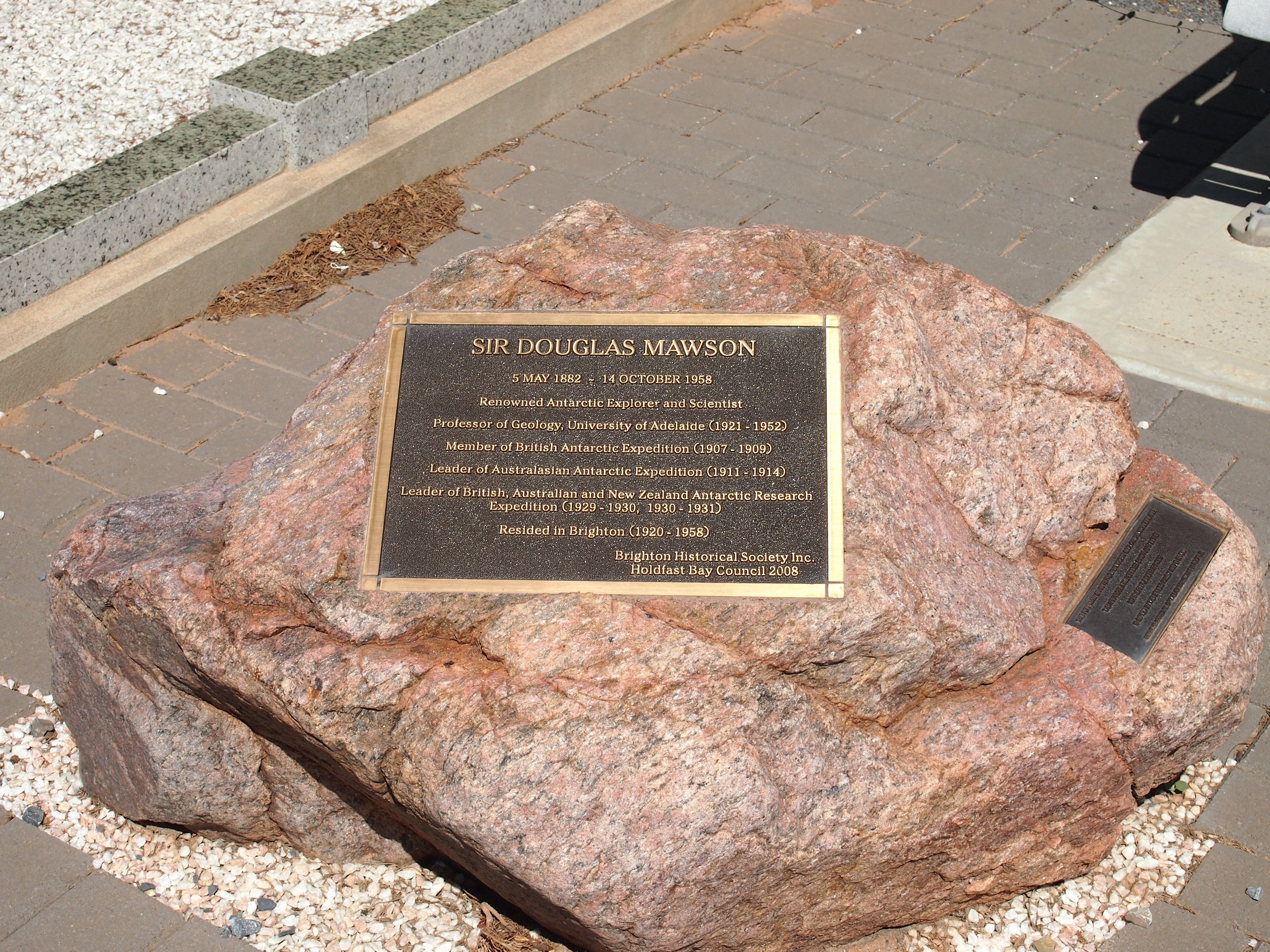
Main plaque on the granite boulder marking Mawson's grave

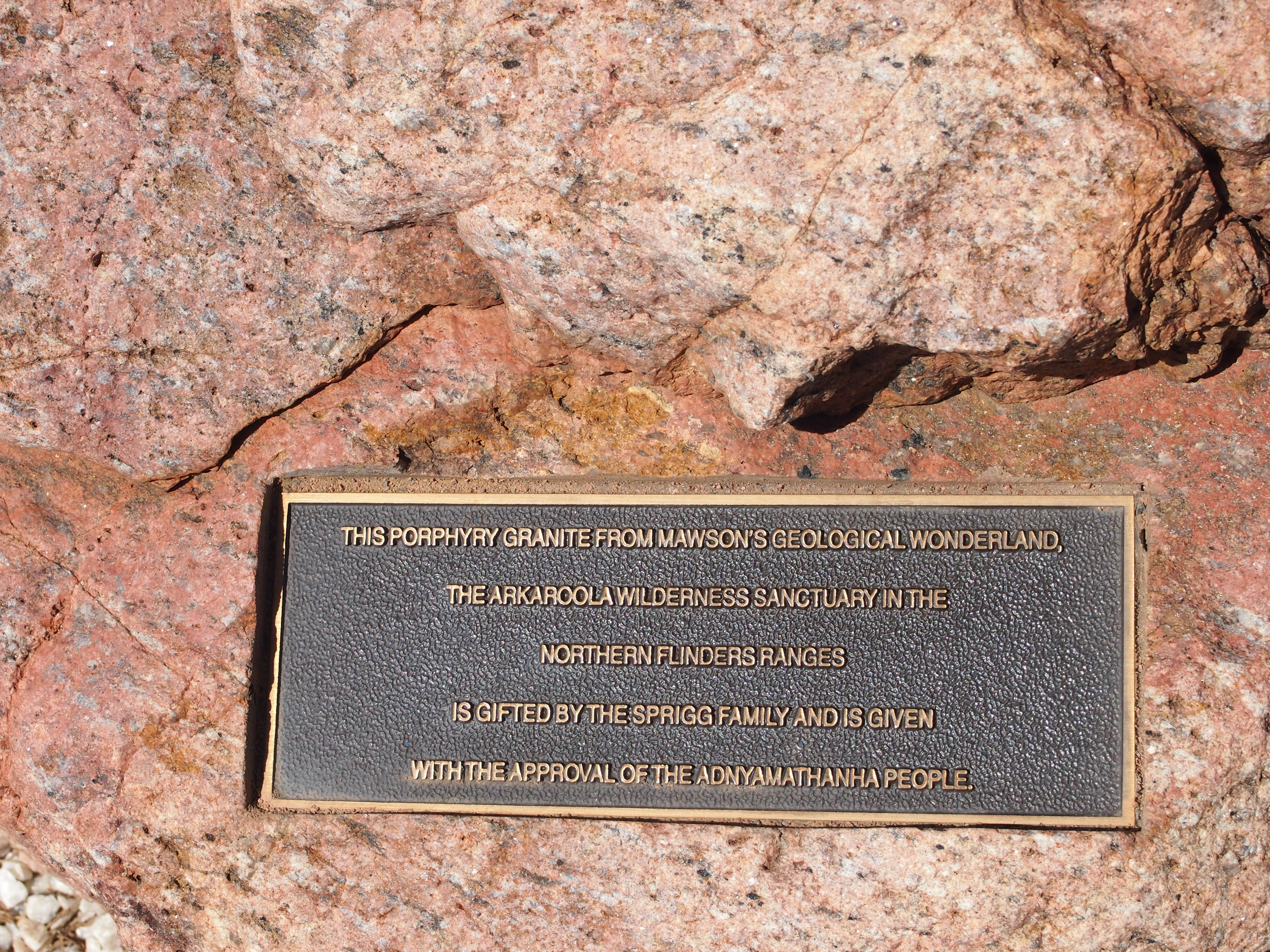
Plaque acknowledging gift of a boulder from Arkaroola

He died at his Brighton home in South Australia on 14 October 1958 from a cerebral haemorrhage, aged 76. Prime Minister Robert Menzies said of him upon hearing of his death: "Sir Douglas Mawson was one of the very great men of my lifetime. He had courage, remarkable ability, great vision and great tenacity. Future generations of Australians will look back on his life as a source of inspiration".

He was honoured with a Commonwealth state funeral on 17 October at St Jude's Church in Brighton, South Australia, where he was also interred. The Governor-General Sir William Slim, was not able to attend, but was represented at the funeral by Brigadier G. E. H. Bleby.

A memorial service was also held at St Peter's Cathedral in Adelaide, arranged by the University of Adelaide.

On 31 October 1958, a tribute to his memory was paid by members of the Soviet Geographical Society at a special meeting. Evgeny Suzyumov, (Note: Misspelt as "Evengi Suzyumov" in the Canberra Times article; variously transliterated in Russian press as Evgeny Suzyumov, Yevgeny Suzyumov and Eugene Matveyevich Suzyumov (1908–1998).) a member of the First Russian Antarctic Expedition, said that Mawson had developed friendships with Soviet Antarctic explorers in his later years.

In 2008, the Brighton Historical Society with support from the Mawson and Sprigg families, endorsed by the Holdfast Bay Council, installed an official monument at the gravesite of both Paquita and Douglas Mawson. The monument consists of a granite boulder from Arkaroola, gifted by the Sprigg family with the approval of the Adnyamathanha people. A small plaque acknowledges the gift, while the main plaque highlights some of Mawson's achievements.

=== Ongoing work on BANZARE papers ===
At the time of his death he had still not completed editorial work on all the papers resulting from the BANZARE. He had been assisted in this work by his eldest daughter, Patricia Thomas, and upon his death, the Science and Industry Endowment Fund provided a £300 grant to assist in completing the work. Thomas completed the work in 1975.

== Legacy ==
=== General ===
Mawson's early geological studies were highly regarded. Frederick Chapman, then palaeontologist at the National Museum of Victoria and later the Commonwealth government official palaeontologist, based two of his own studies on Mawson's New Hebridean study (1905 & 1907). A paper co-authored by Chapman and Mawson was published in the Quarterly Journal of the Geological Society of London in 1906—significant recognition for one so early in his career. Two of his studies (both 1949), along with a 1947 study by Reg Sprigg as well as more recent studies, are cited in support of the application to make seven geographically separate areas in the Flinders Ranges a World Heritage Site. The application was submitted to the UNESCO World Heritage Centre for consideration in 2021, and as of August 2025 remain on the "tentative" list. Alderman and Tilley (1960) considered that Mawson could be regarded as one of the founders of geochemistry in Australia, based on his early work on the chemical aspects of geology.

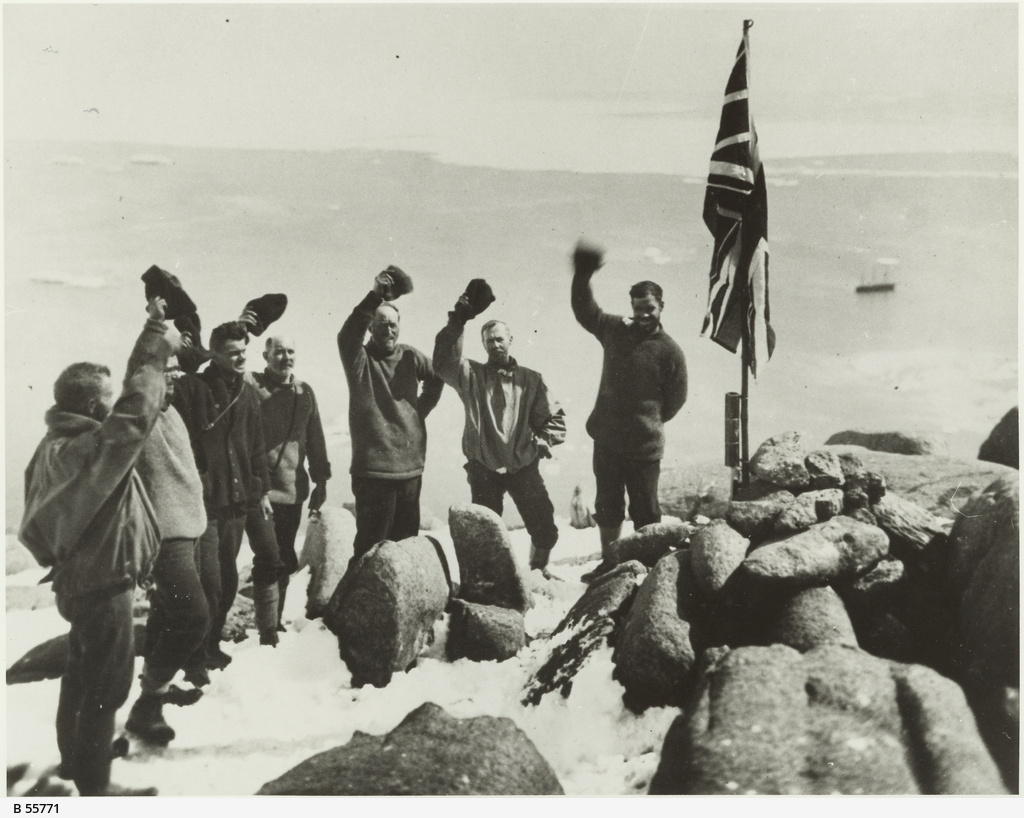
Men of the BANZARE expedition at Proclamation Rock, Antarctica, in 1930

As leader of the BANZARE expeditions, Mawson was instrumental in establishing the territorial claim to 42% of the Antarctic during 1929–1930 and 1930–1931, which was established under legislation passed in 1933.

According to ADB biographer F. J. Jacka: "He did not propound new, fundamental theories but he extended and developed geological thinking and knowledge over a wide range of topics and locations, and through his leadership created opportunities for the realization of major developments in many disciplines. His lectures about Antarctica were widely acclaimed around the world". His former mentor Edgeworth David said of Mawson in a public tribute: "Mawson was the real leader who was the soul of our expedition to the Magnetic Pole. We really have in him an Australian Nansen, of infinite resource, splendid physique, astonishing indifference to frost". J. Gordon Hayes wrote in his book The conquest of the south pole; Antarctic exploration, 1906–1931 (1928): "Sir Douglas Mawson's Expedition, judged by the magnitude both of its scale and of its achievements, was the greatest and most consummate expedition that ever sailed for Antarctica".

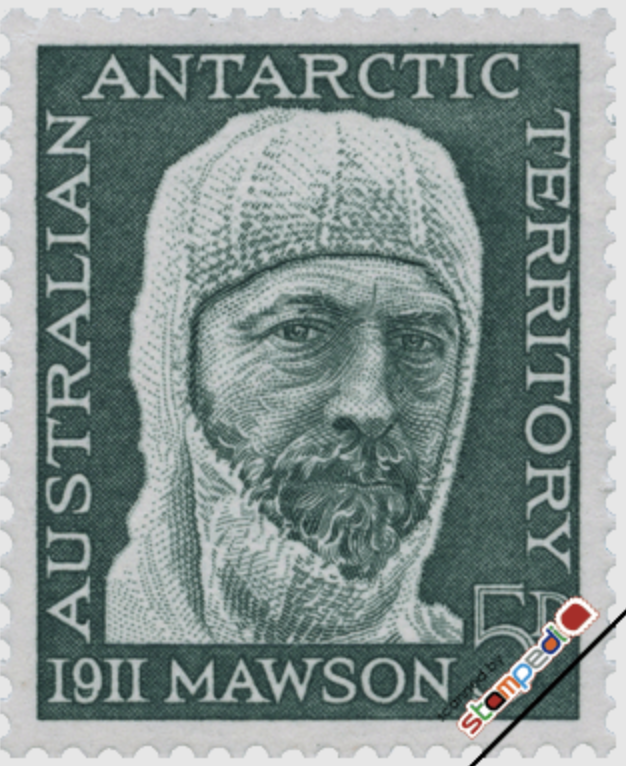
1911 A. A. T. postage stamp

Soon after news of the disastrous Far Eastern expedition broke, Mawson's decision to put such a large amount of their essential provisions on one sledge was criticised. Mark Pharoah, researcher and curator of the Mawson Collection at the South Australian Museum, said that since the release of his journals and other expedition records, historians have questioned his navigational and leadership abilities, and criticised his risk-taking. J. Gordon Hayes was critical of the three men not using skis.

His image appeared on several postage stamps of the Australian Antarctic Territory: 5 pence (1961), 5 pence (1961), 27 cents and 75 cents (1982), 10 cents (2011) and 45 cents (1999).

In 1979 the Australian Academy of Science established the Mawson Lecture.

The centenary of Mawson's birth was celebrated in 1982, which included the Fourth International Symposium on Antarctic Earth Sciences being held at the University of Adelaide, with the proceedings dedicated to him, held in August. The symposium was brought forward two years and held in Adelaide to mark the occasion.

In 1983 the Douglas Mawson chair of geology was established at the University of Adelaide. As of 2024, Professor Alan Collins held the post.

His image appeared from 1984 to 1996 on the first Australian one-hundred-dollar note, and in 2012 on a $1 coin issued within the "Inspirational Australians" series.

One of Mawson's students at the University of Adelaide was Reg Sprigg, who discovered Precambrian fossils when assessing an old mine site in the Ediacara Hills in 1946. His discovery led to other geologists defining a new geological period, the Ediacaran, for the first time in over 100 years, which was officially ratified by the IUGS in 2004. Sprigg co-founded, with his wife Griselda, the Arkaroola Wilderness Sanctuary, and named his son Douglas after his former mentor. Doug Sprigg continues to run the sanctuary as of 2024.

Tim Jarvis in Antarctica in 2007

In 2007, adventurer Tim Jarvis re-enacted Mawson's expedition to Antarctica, simulating the conditions in the 1912 trek. They followed the same route and tried to do everything done by Mawson's expedition, although did not eat any dogs. Jarvis said afterwards that it gave him a new-found respect for Mawson.

In 2011, Ranulph Fiennes included Mawson in his book My Heroes: Extraordinary Courage, Exceptional People.

In May 2012, the Australian Antarctic Magazine published a "Mawson Centenary Special" issue to commemorate 100 years since the Australasian Antarctic Expedition.

In 2013, the "Australian Mawson Centenary Expedition", led by Chris Turney and Chris Fogwill, scientists from the UNSW Climate Change Research Centre, led a privately-funded expedition of 48 people including scientists and members of the public, to investigate Antarctic and subantarctic oceanography, climate and biology. The expedition visited Mawson's huts at Cape Denison, using motorised vehicles with tracks to traverse the 65 km (40 mi) of ice from the shore. On the return journey, their ship, the MV Akademik Shokalskiy, became trapped in ice. After two other vessels were unable to reach the stricken ship, the expedition members were eventually being airlifted by helicopter to the Chinese polar research vessel Xue Long, while the Russian crew members had to stay on board the ship. Turney presented the results of their findings at an event at the Royal Institution in London in July 2014.

Reviewing David Roberts' 2013 book Alone on the Ice in The Observer, Paul Harris called Mawson "the unsung hero of Antarctica". In the book, Roberts suggests that Mawson was little known for two reasons: firstly that the British press of the time focused on British "imperial heroes" such as Scott; and secondly that Mawson had opted for carrying out scientific expeditions rather than the "exciting race to the south pole that had captured the public imagination".

In 2015, the Australian Museum in Sydney developed an exhibition called Trailblazers: Australia's 50 Greatest Explorers, which included Mawson.

Mawson Analytical Spectrometry Services (MASS) are facilities offered by the Faculty of Sciences, Engineering and Technology at the University of Adelaide to researchers and commercial partners. The service provides thermal ionisation mass spectrometry, Stable Isotope Ratio Mass Spectrometry, and Organic Molecular Analysis and Characterisation.

At Oxley College (founded in 1982) in Burradoo, New South Wales, one of the six houses is called Mawson, as is at Clarence High School in Hobart, Tasmania, Forest Lodge Public School, and Fort Street High School, both in Sydney, where he was educated.

In April 2023, Emma McEwin, a great-granddaughter of Mawson, presented the Sir Hubert Wilkins Oration for the History Trust of South Australia, "explor[ing] the personalities and backgrounds of both Hubert Wilkins and Douglas Mawson".

=== Genera and species ===
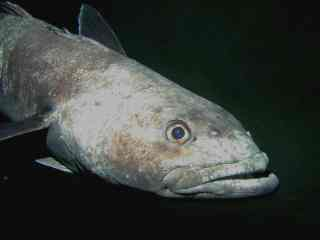
Antarctic toothfish

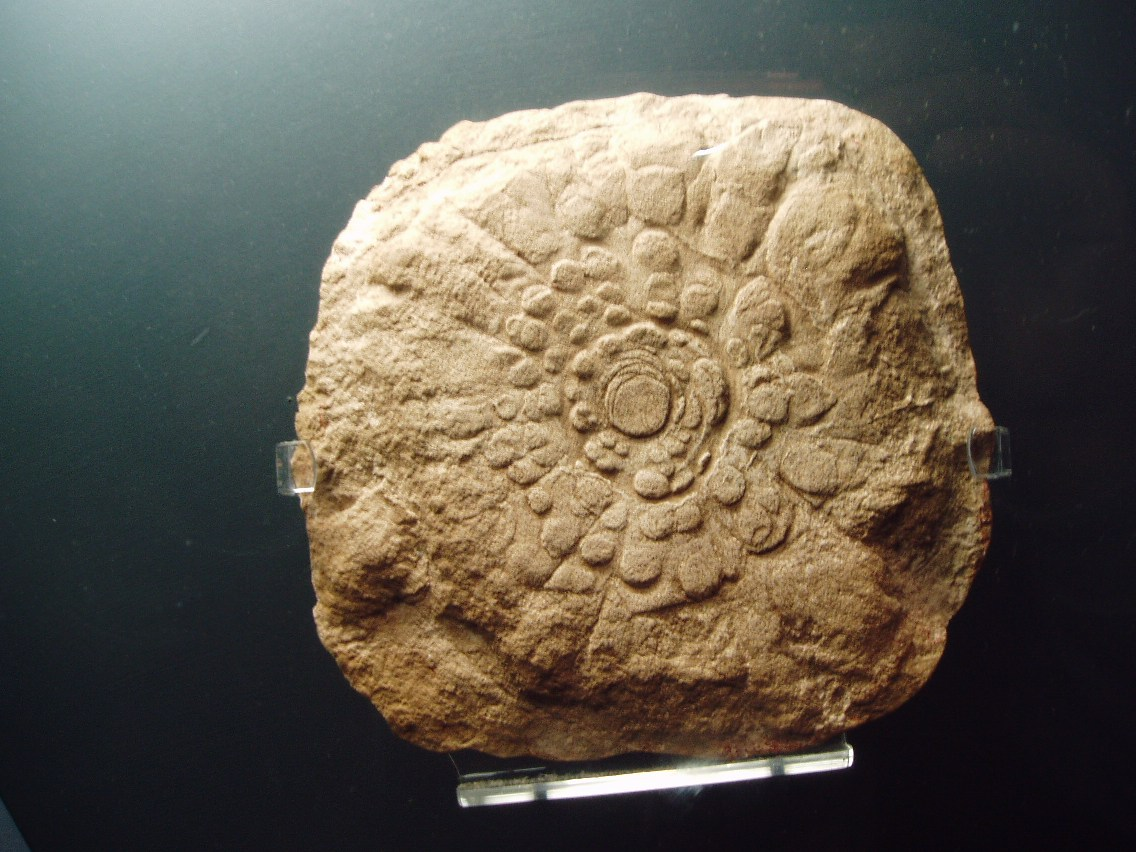
Mawsonites spriggi

In 1937 the fish species Dissostichus mawsoni (Antarctic toothfish) was named by English ichthyologist John Roxborough Norman in honour of Mawson, as the 1911–1913 Australasian Antarctic Expedition obtained the species' type specimen.

In 1948, Carroll William Dodge published a genus of fungi within the family Lichinaceae, named Mawsonia in his honour.

In 1966, the fossil genus Mawsonites, dated to the Ediacaran, was named after Mawson, and its type species, Mawsonites spriggi, after his student Reg Sprigg, by Martin Glaessner and Mary Wade.

=== Collections ===
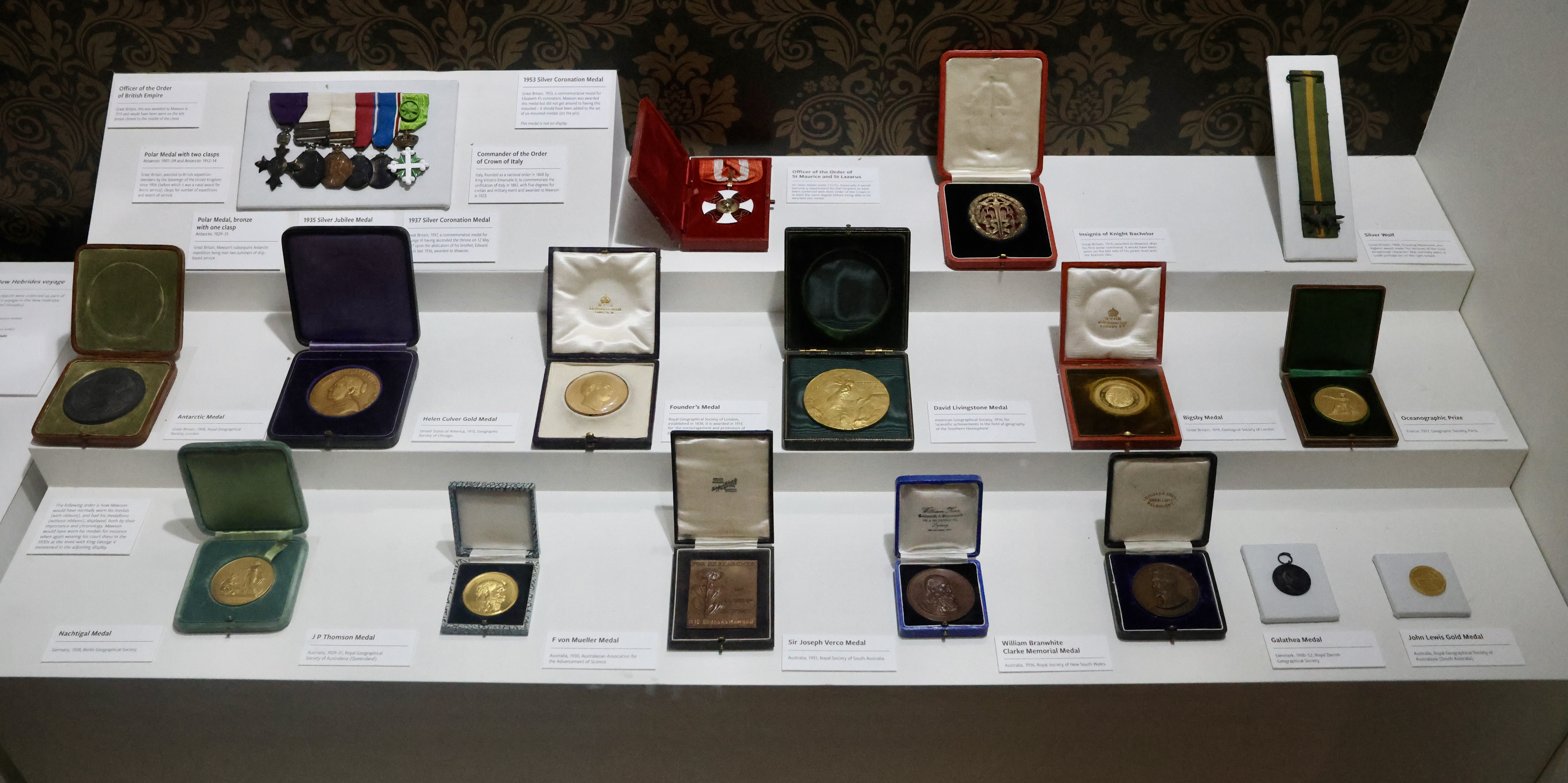
Mawson's awards and decorations at the South Australian Museum (2025)

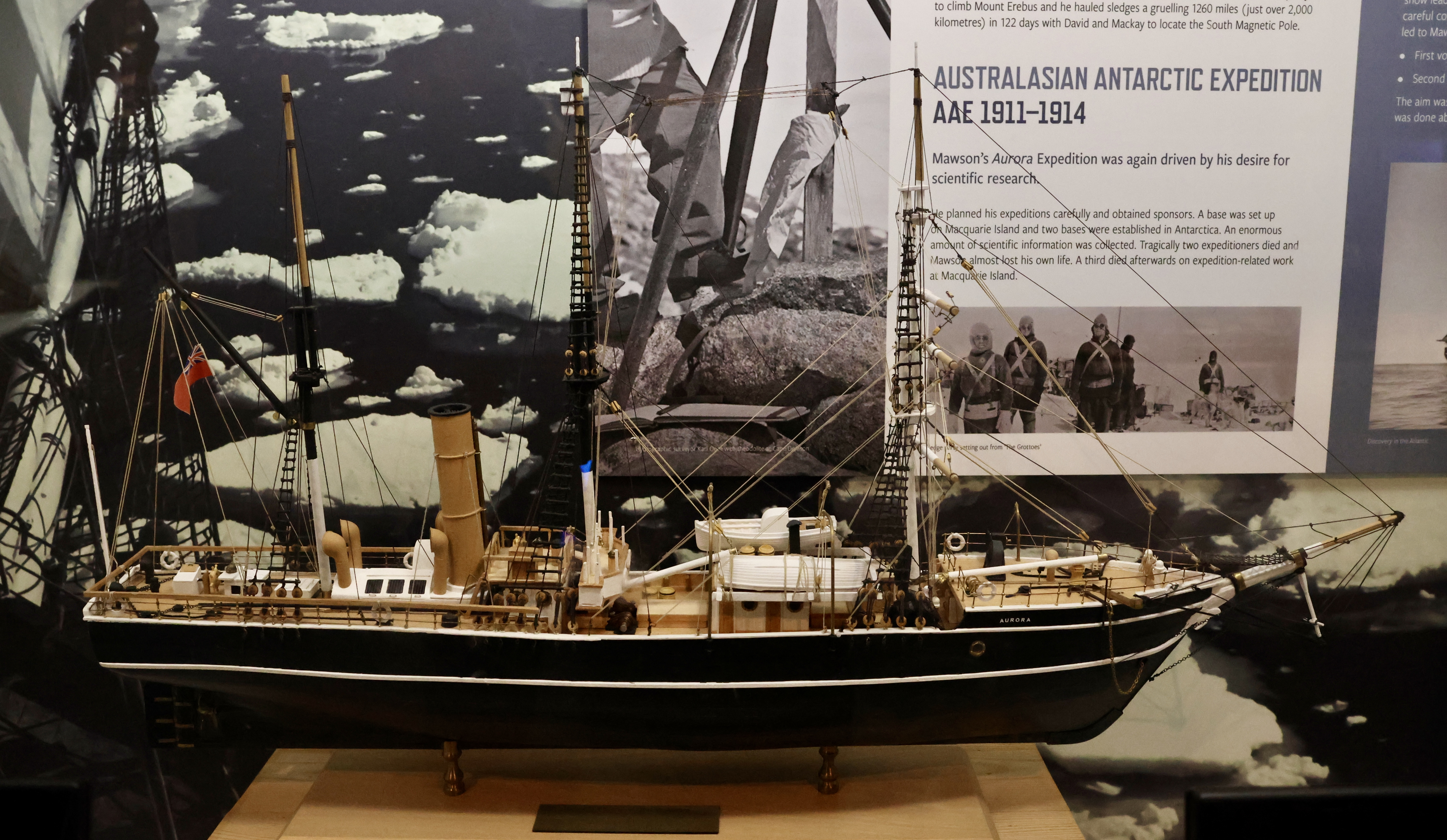
Model of SY Aurora at the South Australian Museum

The Australian Polar Collection of Antarctic exploration artefacts is on permanent display at the South Australian Museum. Previously known as the Mawson Gallery, in 2018 the gallery underwent development to expand the displays of two other South Australian explorers, John Riddoch Rymill and George Hubert Wilkins. The Mawson collection is the largest of the three collections, containing over 100,000 items. These were acquired in two lots: one came from the Australian Museum in Sydney, while a larger collection of items was donated by the Mawson family via the University of Adelaide in 2000. The collection includes Mawson's balaclava, as illustrated on the hundred-dollar note, as well as his earliest surviving field notebook after arriving in Adelaide, which include notes on Mount Lofty, Kangaroo Island, Broken Hill, and Olary. The Mawson Collection Trust, made up of descendants of Douglas and Paquita Mawson, provided significant funding towards renewing the gallery in 2017.

The Douglas Mawson Antarctic Collection is held in the Tate Museum in the Mawson Building at the University of Adelaide, along with many minerals, rocks, fossils, and other specimens related to geological phenomena. The museum, named after Ralph Tate, foundation Elder Professor of Natural Sciences at the university of from 1875 until 1901, opened in 1902, and moved into Mawson Laboratories (Building) when it opened in 1952.

The Australian Museum has a collection of 2000 Antarctic rock and mineral specimens collected on the Australasian Antarctic Expedition, named the Sir Douglas Mawson Collection.

The National Library of Australia in Canberra holds a collection of papers relating to the Mawson family, collected by Gareth Thomas and presented to the library in 2010. Most of the papers consist of personal correspondence of Paquita Mawson principally with her daughter Patricia, but also includes letters to her daughter Jessica and other members of her extended family, some written from the Netherlands in Dutch. There are a few letters written by Douglas Mawson to Patricia between 1925 and 1931.

The Sir Douglas Mawson Collection at the National Museum of Australia contains four items relating to BANZARE in 1931, including three proclamations relating to claiming land in Antarctica, and a food canister.

In his role as honorary curator of the South Australian Museum from 1906 to 1958, Mawson was instrumental in helping to establish the minerals collection there. In 1906, he arranged the purchase of part of the John Henry Dunstan Collection, which contained significant specimens from the copper mines at Burra, Moonta and Wallaroo Mines. This formed the core of the museum's now extensive minerals collection, and was at the time the largest private mineral collection in country. Mawson also assisted in the purchase of the Hall and Watkin Brown Collections, which included many specimens from Broken Hill and other important places in New South Wales.

==== Transcription of early diaries ====
Mawson's Antarctic and field diaries are kept in the South Australian Museum. Those pertaining to his extensive Australian geological field work have been transcribed fairly recently at the museum. The transcription work, undertaken by volunteers including Mawson's grandson Alun Thomas, was undertaken from around 2005 to 2025.

Between 1905 and 1953 Mawson carried out many field trips, mostly in northeastern South Australia, and he kept diaries of every one of his roughly 70 trips. Over 30 field note books, each recording one or more trips, are held in the Polar Collection at the South Australian Museum, along with more than 2000 photographs, mostly taken on his field trips. Many of the diaries are illustrated by hand-drawn sketches and geological sections, and scans of these sketches as well as the photographs have been inserted into the transcribed diaries. The diaries also include accounts of the annual excursions with third-year geology students, who only numbered a few in the early trips but by 1948 there were 17 students and staff. If a female student was included, a female chaperone would be included, and in 1937 Mawson's daughters Patricia and Jessica joined a student excursion.

Mawson recorded significant geological observations in these diaries, mostly for his own research and preparation of scientific papers, so used many abbreviations indecipherable to the lay reader. These have been deciphered and included in the transcriptions with the help of geologist Jim Jago. The diaries also provide an interesting historical record of the times. The work continues, and it is hoped to make the content of the transcribed diaries, along with drawings and photographs, more widely available.

=== Places and landmarks ===
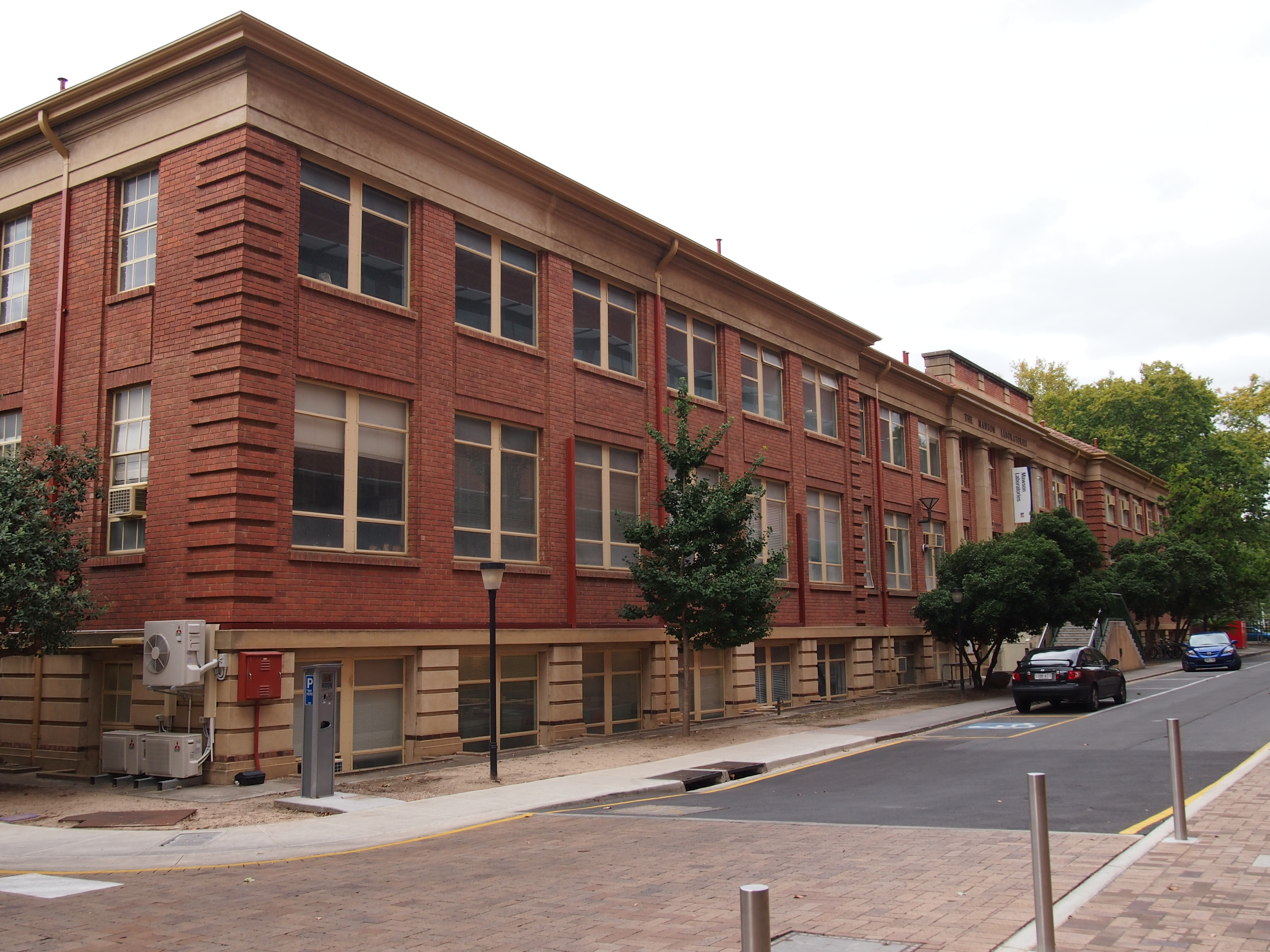
The Mawson Building at the University of Adelaide

The geology building on the main University of Adelaide campus was named Mawson Laboratories on the occasion of his retirement in 1952. The building is now known as the Mawson Building. In November 1959, the Mawson Institute for Antarctic Research was established within the Department of Geology, in what is as of 2025 known as the Mawson Geo Centre. The aim of the institute was to foster Antarctic study and research, by the maintenance of a library and collection, and by the delivery of occasional public lectures. The Mawson Institute was officially opened on 15 April 1961 by the prime minister, Robert Menzies, and included the collection of Mawson's geological and historical artefacts bequeathed by Paquita Mawson after Mawson's death. A recording of his speech is available online via the National Library of Australia website.

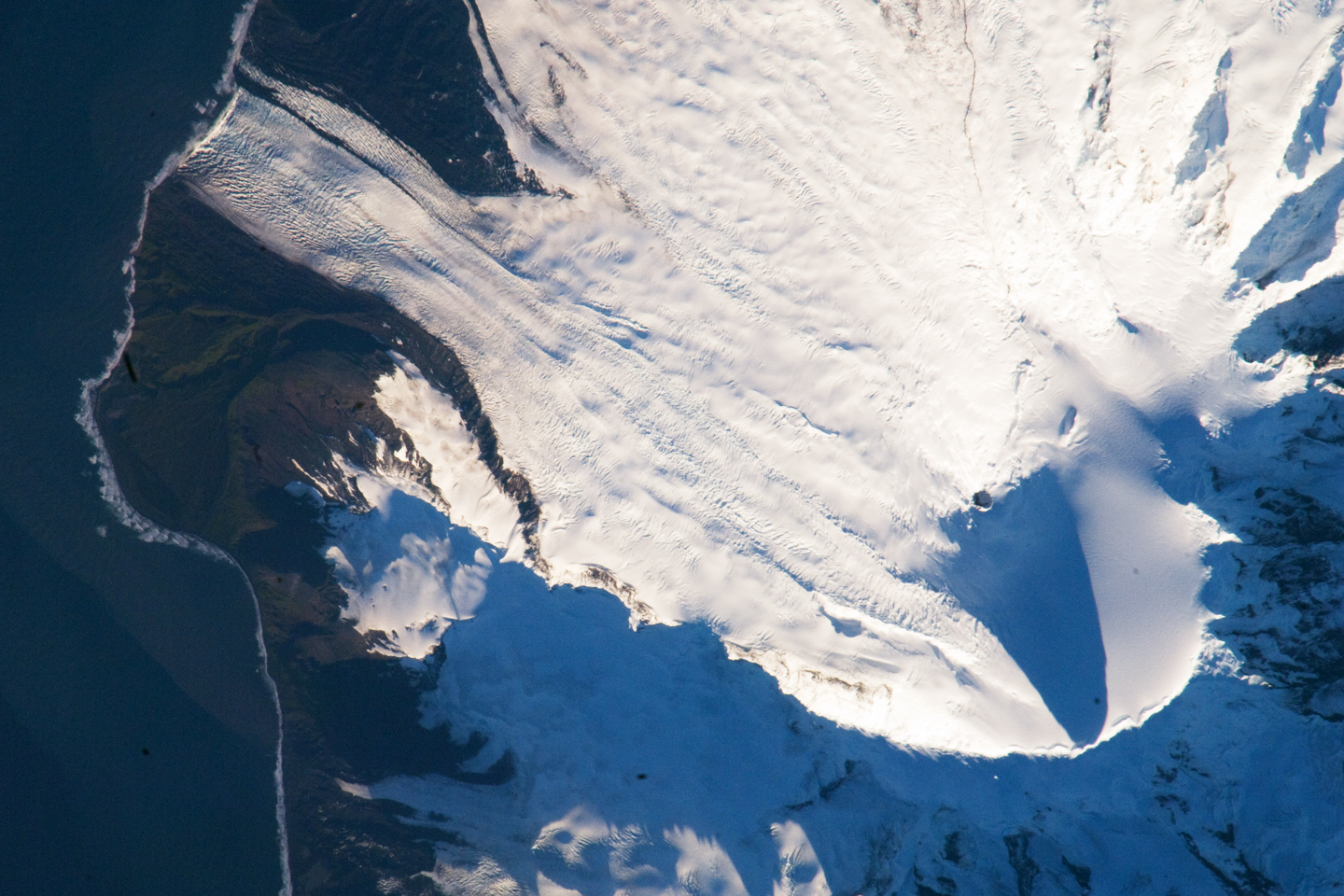
Mawson Peak, aerial view

On 21 October 1952, Mawson Peak, an active volcanic summit on Heard Island, Antarctica, was officially named in honour of Mawson.

Mawson Station in Antarctica was officially named after Mawson on 13 February 1954. Phillip Law, inaugural director of the Australian Antarctic Division, selected the location near Horseshoe Harbour as Australia's first overwintering station on the Antarctic continent, and conducting a flag-raising and official naming ceremony on that date. Mawson is the oldest station established south of the Antarctic Circle. The Mawson Coast was also named after him.

In 1959, a mountain peak in Tasmania was gazetted as Mount Mawson, named after Mawson. (Note: Verified by email from a representative of Registrar of Place Names, Land Tasmania, Department of Natural Resources and Environment Tasmania, 3 July 2025.) It lies within the Mount Field National Park.

Mawson is a suburb of Canberra, Australian Capital Territory. The suburb was gazetted in 1966 and is named after him. The theme for street names in this area is Antarctic exploration.

In 1969 the District of Mawson, an electoral district of South Australia, was created and named in honour of Mawson.

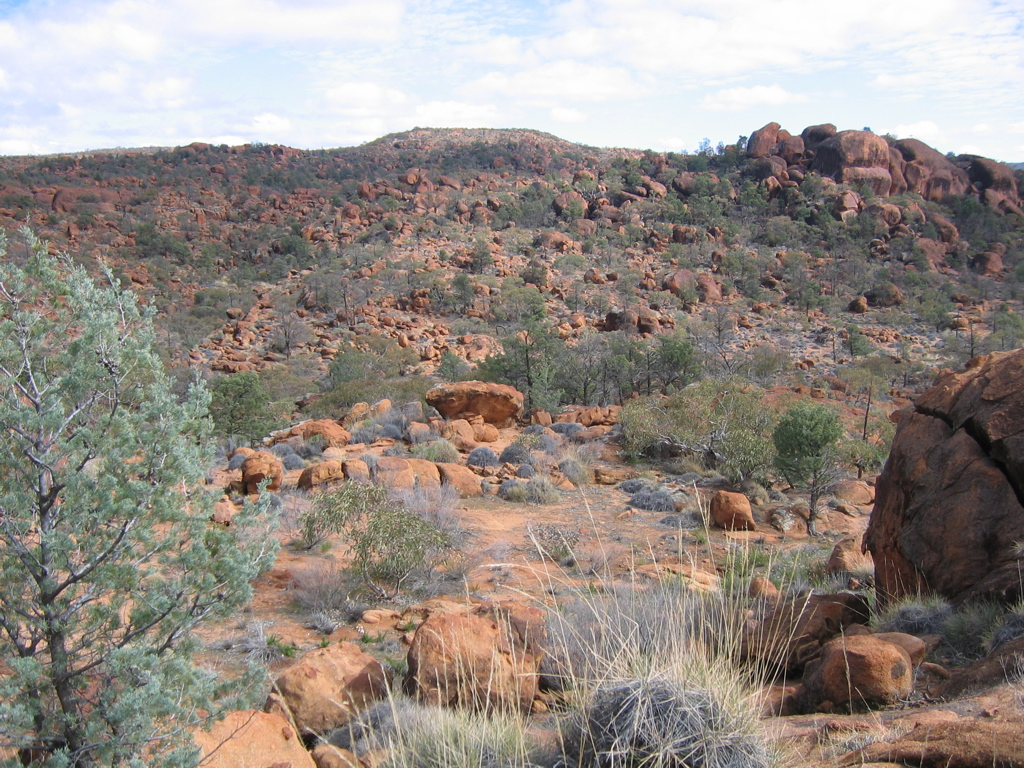
Mawson Plateau

Mawson Plateau, situated in what is now the Arkaroola Protection Area in the Northern Flinders Ranges, was originally known as the Freeling Heights lower granite plateau. It was named after Mawson some time before 1984. Mawson Valley is also in Arkaroola, and Mawson was responsible for naming a rocky granite outcrop in the valley "Sitting Bull" in 1945.

Minor planet 4456 Mawson was named in his honour after its discovery on 27 July 1989 by R. H. McNaught at Siding Spring Observatory in New South Wales. as is Dorsa Mawson, a wrinkle ridge on the Moon.

The Mawson Trail, a cycling and walking trail created in the 1990s, stretching from the Adelaide Hills to the Flinders Ranges, was named after Mawson.

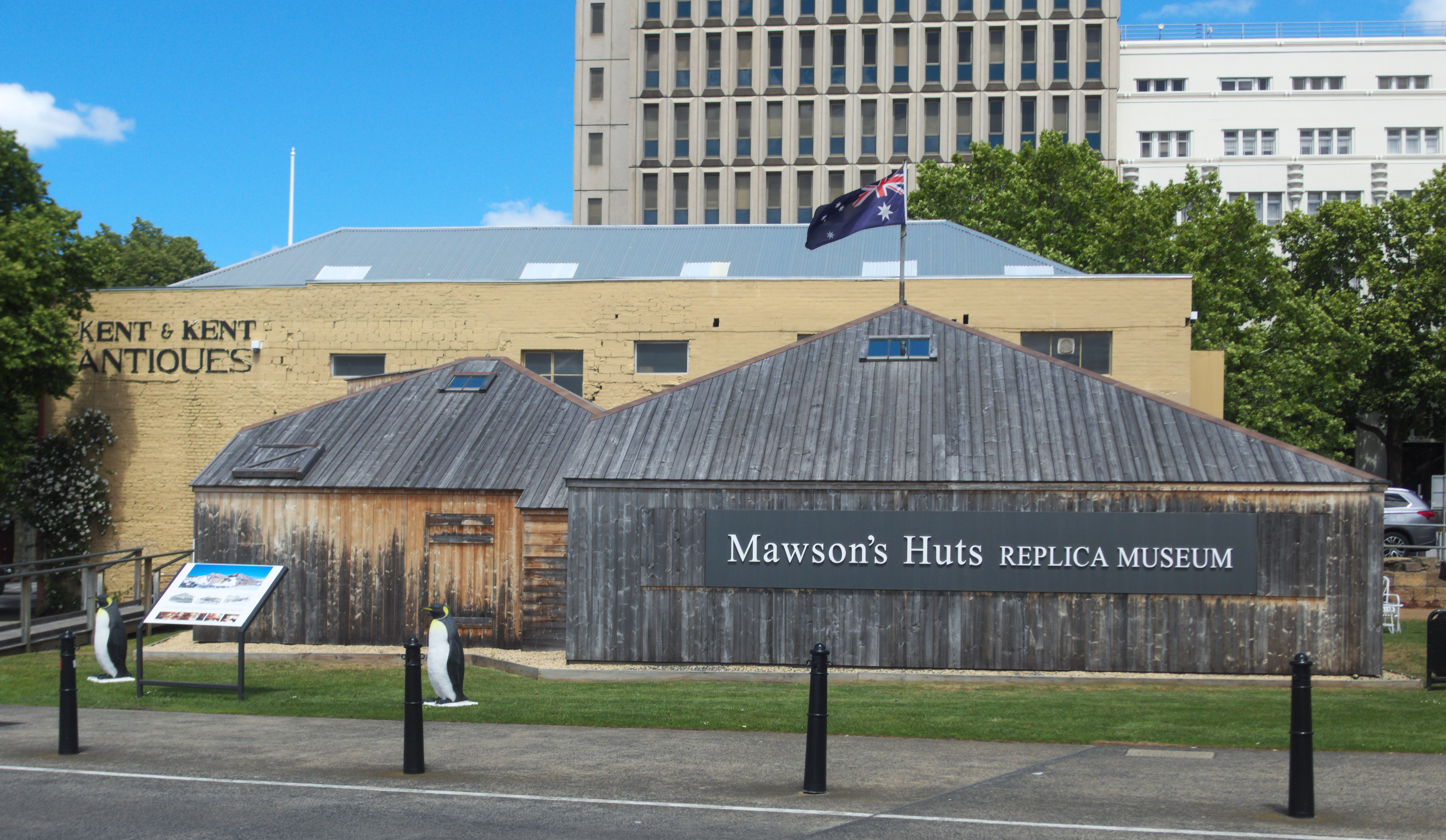
Mawson's Huts Replica Museum, Hobart

The Mawson's Huts Foundation, based in Sydney, was established in 1996 as a charity. It works on conserving Mawson's Huts at Cape Denison, has funded and organised 14 major expeditions there, and in 2013, it opened the Mawson's Huts Replica Museum in Hobart. The museum is located on the waterfront, near the wharf used by SY Aurora.

The suburb Mawson Lakes, a northern suburb of Adelaide, was founded in the late 1990s and named in his honour, and one of the two man-made lakes in the suburb is called the Sir Douglas Mawson Lake. A campus of the University of South Australia in the suburb is known as the Mawson Lakes campus.

The high street in Meadows, South Australia, the town near his farm, Harewood, is named after him.

=== In the arts and popular culture ===
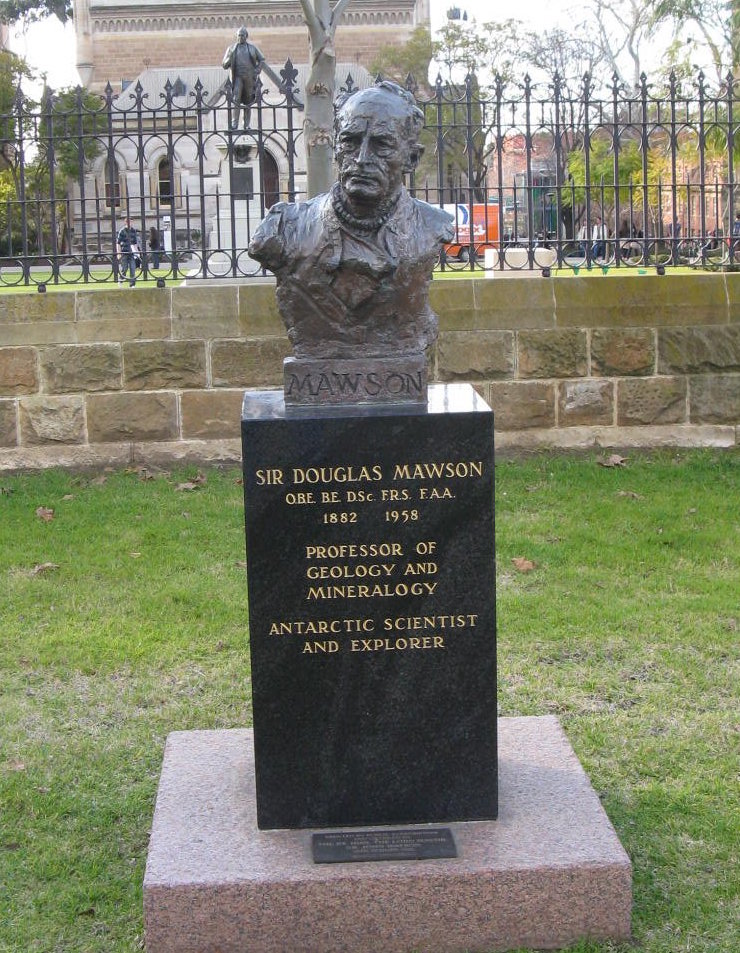
Bust of Mawson on North Terrace, Adelaide, in front of the University of Adelaide, created by John Dowie in 1982

After official photographer Frank Hurley's return from AAE in early 1913, documentary footage attributed to him was released in cinemas. Now often referred to as Home of the Blizzard in Australia, this silent film has a complicated provenance, and it is no longer known which reels (now restored and held by the NFSA) were shown in the 1913 cinema showing. This version of the film was released in the UK as Life in the Antarctic.

Two films about BANZARE, the silent film Southward Ho with Mawson (1930) and the talkie Siege of the South (1931), both made by Frank Hurley using footage filmed by him on the expeditions, were released in cinemas as official recordings of the voyages. Takings from the film contributed to defray the costs of the expedition, and schoolchildren's attendance contributed significantly to the takings.

A portrait of Mawson painted by in 1933 by Henry James Haley was gifted to the National Portrait Gallery in Canberra by the Mawson family in 2010. Other portraits of him were painted by W. Seppelt (1922); Jack Carington Smith (1955); and Ivor Hele (1956), which are (or were) held in the University of Adelaide. Another by Hele, created in 1959, is held by the Royal Geographical Society in London.

Adelaide sculptor John Dowie created two bronze busts of Mawson in 1982, one of which is on North Terrace, Adelaide, and another at Mawson Station in Antarctica. The bust on North Terrace, which had been suggested by Fred Jacka of the Mawson Institute, was endorsed by Adelaide city council, and partly funded by a public fund-raising effort. Lord Mayor of Adelaide Arthur John Watson made the presentation, and Sir Mark Oliphant unveiled the bust, which coincided with the Fourth International Symposium on Antarctic Earth Sciences, brought forward two years to celebrate the centenary of Mawson's birth. The bust is mounted on a marble base, and has a boulder of igneous rock situated on either side. The eastern boulder is of pegmatite from Mawson Valley in Arkaroola, while the western boulder is of charnockite, from Mawson, Antarctica. Another bronze bust, created by Jean Perrier in 1980, is held in Canterbury Museum in Christchurch, New Zealand. In 2023 the City of Holdfast Bay resolved to commission of a memorial bronze bust of Mawson for placement somewhere in Brighton, where the Mawson family lived.

In 1991, Irish folk musician Andy Irvine recorded the song "Douglas Mawson" for his album Rude Awakening. The song recounts the events of the Far Eastern Party of the Antarctic expedition.

In 2008, ABC Television screened a feature-length documentary film, titled Mawson: Life and Death in Antarctica, about Tim Jarvis's recreation of Mawson's journey. Jarvis also released a book of the same name that year. The film is available via the National Film and Sound Archive website and the library streaming service Kanopy.

David Roberts' 2013 account of Mawson's AAE expedition, Alone on the Ice, and the deadly effect of dog liver, are referenced in the plot of S3 E3 of British television series New Tricks in 2014, where it is used to commit the almost-perfect murder.

In December 2013, the first opera to be based on Mawson's 1911–1914 expedition to Antarctica, The Call of Aurora (by Tasmanian composer Joe Bugden) was performed at the Peacock Theatre in the Salamanca Arts Centre in Hobart. The opera was again performed at the Peacock in August 2022.

In 2019, Australian Dance Theatre presented the premiere of South by artistic director Garry Stewart in Adelaide. The dance work reflected upon the treacherous journey undertaken by Mawson and his team in the summer of 1912–1913. The work, which toured regional South Australia, was intended to convey a message about the climate change crisis. Stewart won Outstanding Achievement in Choreography for South in 2019 at the Australian Dance Awards.

== Footnotes ==
Awards
Preceded by George William Card	Clarke Medal; 1936	Succeeded by John Thomas Jutson
