= Mount Armytage =

Mountain in Ross Dependency, Antarctica

- Location within Antarctica

Highest point
- Coordinates: 76°02′S 160°45′E

Geography
- Continent: Antarctica
- Region(s): Victoria Land, Antarctica
- Parent range: Transantarctic Mountains

Mount Armytage (76°02′S 160°45′E) is a dome-shaped mountain, 1,855 metres (6,086 ft) high, standing north of Mawson Glacier and 14 nautical miles (26 km; 16 mi) west of Mount Smith. It is in the Prince Albert Mountains

== Exploration and name ==
Mount Armytage was first charted by the Nimrod Expedition (1907–09) which named it for Bertram Armytage, a member of the expedition who was in charge of the ponies.

== Location ==
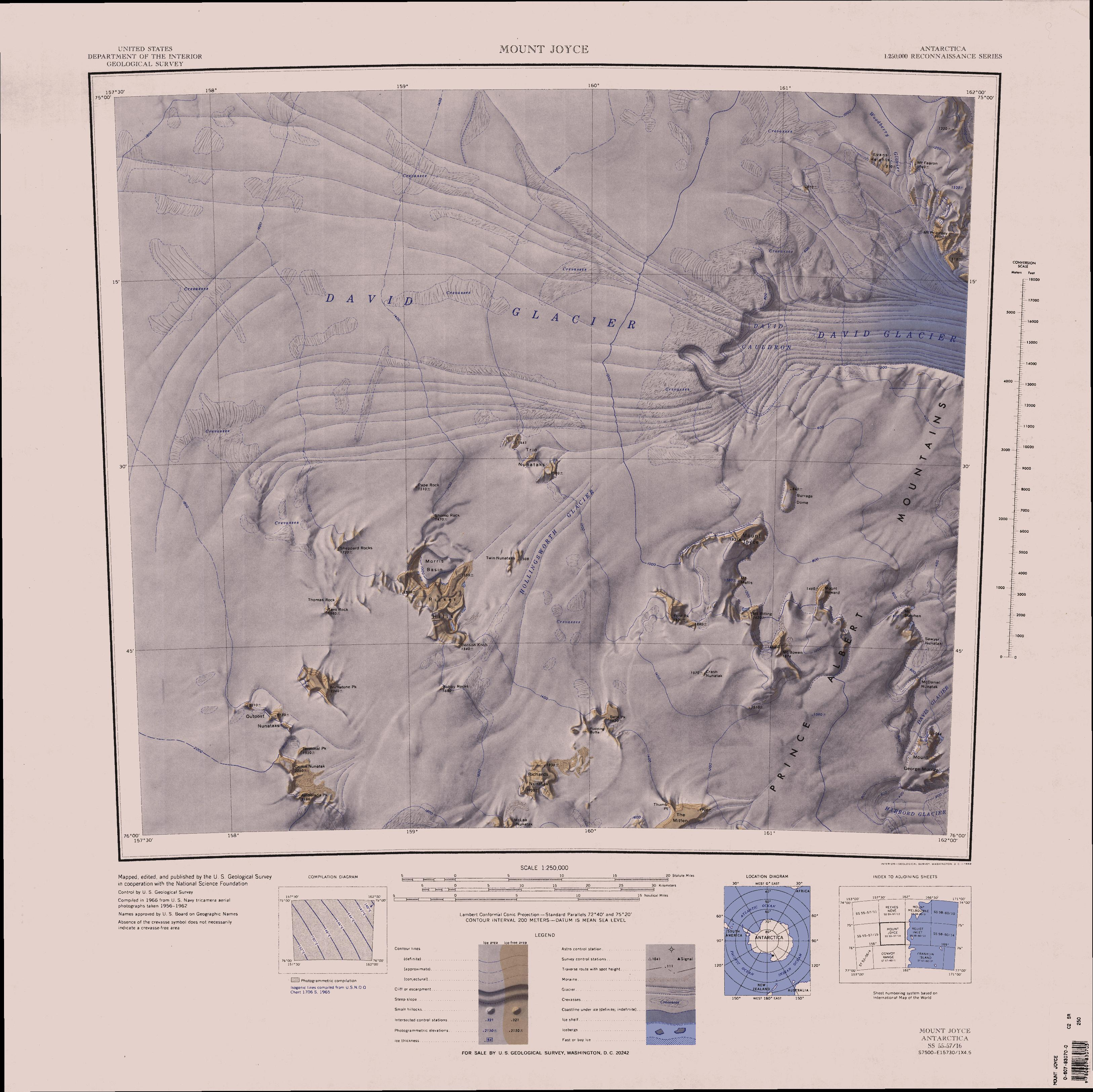
The Mitten in the south margin of the map

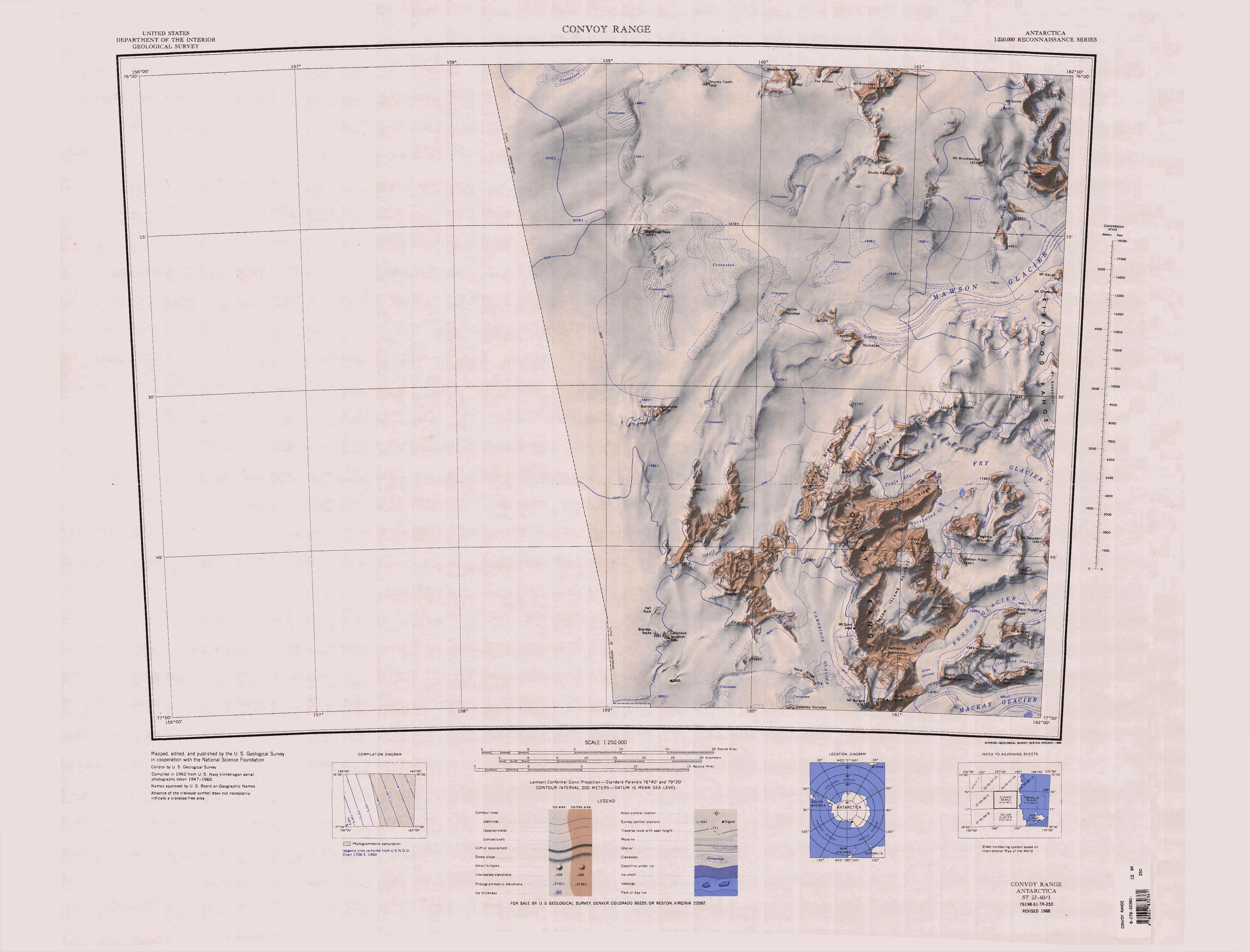
Mount Armytage at northeast margin of map

Shultz Peak lies at the end of a ridge running south from Mount Armytage. Beckett Nunatak and The Mitten are to the west of Mount Armytage. The Mitten terminates in Thumb Point. Mount Joyce is to the north and the Ricker Hills to the northwest. Mount Murray and the Mawson Glacier are to the southeast. The very isolated Reckling Peak is to the southwest.

== Features ==
Nearby features include:

=== Shultz Peak ===
76°10′S 160°51′E. A sharp peak 7 nautical miles (13 km; 8.1 mi) south of Mount Armytage, where it overlooks the north flank of Mawson Glacier. Mapped by USGS from ground surveys and Navy air photos. Named by US-ACAN in 1964 for Lieutenant Willard E. Shultz, United States Navy, supply officer at McMurdo Station, 1962.

=== Beckett Nunatak ===
76°02′S 160°11′E. A flattish, mostly bare rock nunatak lying 9 nautical miles (17 km; 10 mi) west of Mount Armytage and south of Harbord Glacier. Mapped by USGS from ground surveys and Navy air photos. Named by US-ACAN in 1964 for W.T. Beckett, utilities man at McMurdo Station, 1963.

=== The Mitten ===
75°59′S 160°30′E. Bare flat-topped mountain, which resembles a mitten when viewed from above, standing 3 nautical miles (5.6 km; 3.5 mi) northwest of Mount Armytage. Named by the Southern Party of the NZGSAE (1962-63) because of its shape.

=== Thumb Point ===
75°58′S 160°28′E. A rock spur extending from the northwest side of The Mitten, a butte in the Prince Albert Mountains. Named by the Southern Party of NZGSAE, 1962-63, because the feature resembles the thumb on a mitten.

== Sources ==
- Alberts, Fred G., ed. (1995), Geographic Names of the Antarctic (PDF) (2 ed.), United States Board on Geographic Names This article incorporates public domain material from websites or documents of the United States Board on Geographic Names.
- Convoy Range, USGS: United States Geological Survey
- Mount Joyce, USGS: United States Geographic Board

This article incorporates public domain material from websites or documents of the United States Geological Survey.
