= Drygalski =

Drygalski may refer to:

- Erich von Drygalski

Places

- Drygalski Island, Southern Ocean
- Drygalski Glacier (Antarctica)
- Drygalski Glacier (Tanzania)
- Drygalski Basin, Antarctica
- Drygalski Mountains, Antarctica
- Drygalski Ice Tongue, Antarctica
- Mount Drygalski, Antarctica
- Drygalski (crater) on the Moon
