= Mount Joyce =

Mountain in Ross Dependency, Antarctica

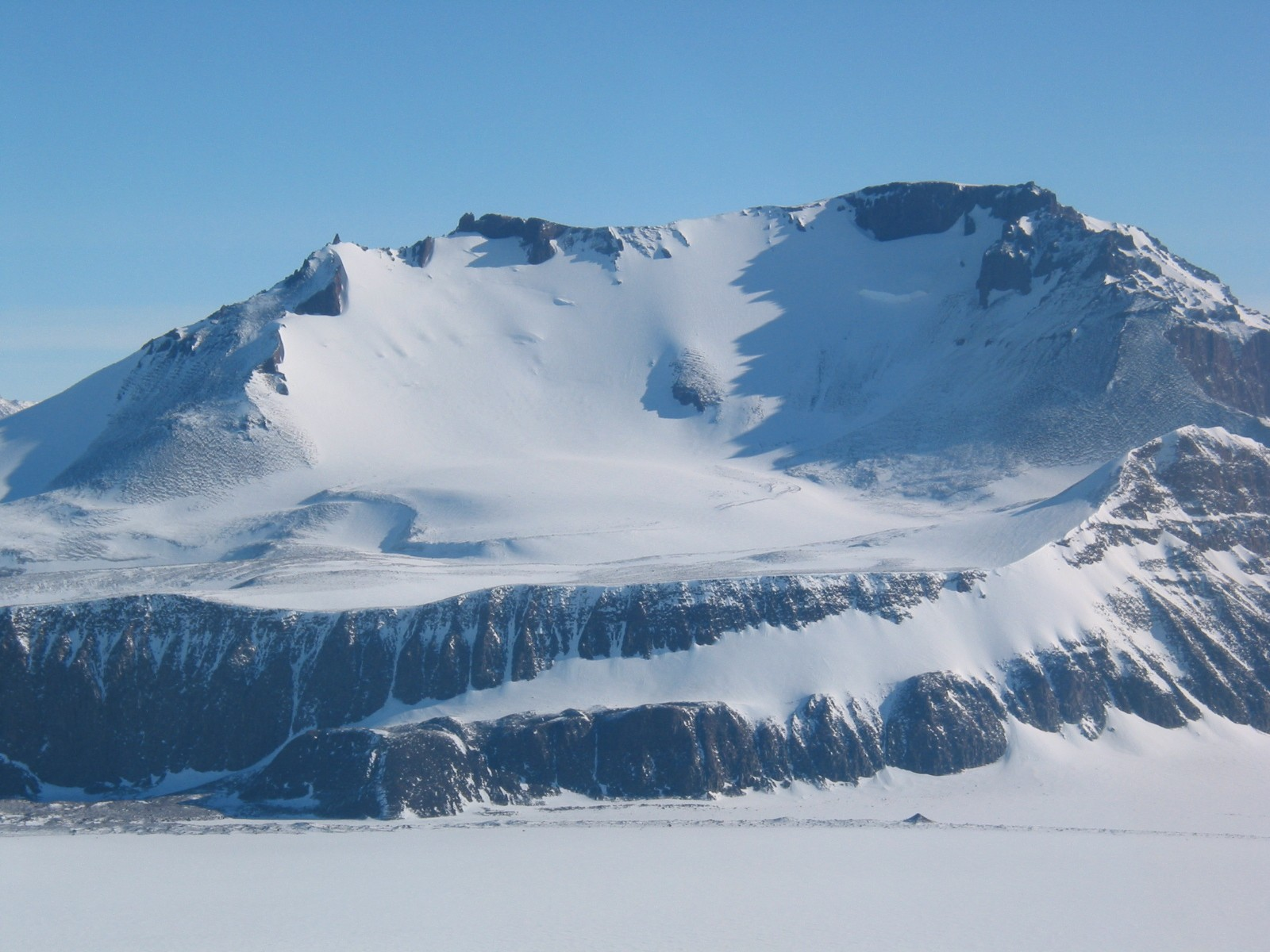
- North side of Mount Joyce

Highest point
- Elevation: 1,830 metres (6,000 ft)
- Coordinates: 75°36′S 160°49′E

Geography
- Location within Antarctica
- Location: south side of David Glacier, Antarctica

Mount Joyce (75°36′S 160°49′E) is a prominent, dome-shaped mountain, 1,830 metres (6,000 ft) high, standing 8 nautical miles (15 km) northwest of Mount Howard in the Prince Albert Mountains of Victoria Land, Antarctica.

== Exploration and name ==
Mount Joyce was first mapped by the British Antarctic Expedition, 1907–09, which named it for Ernest Joyce who was in charge of general stores, dogs, sledges, and zoological collections with the expedition and who had earlier been with the British National Antarctic Expedition, 1901–04. Joyce was also with the Ross Sea party of Shackleton's Imperial Trans-Antarctic Expedition, 1914–17.

== Location ==
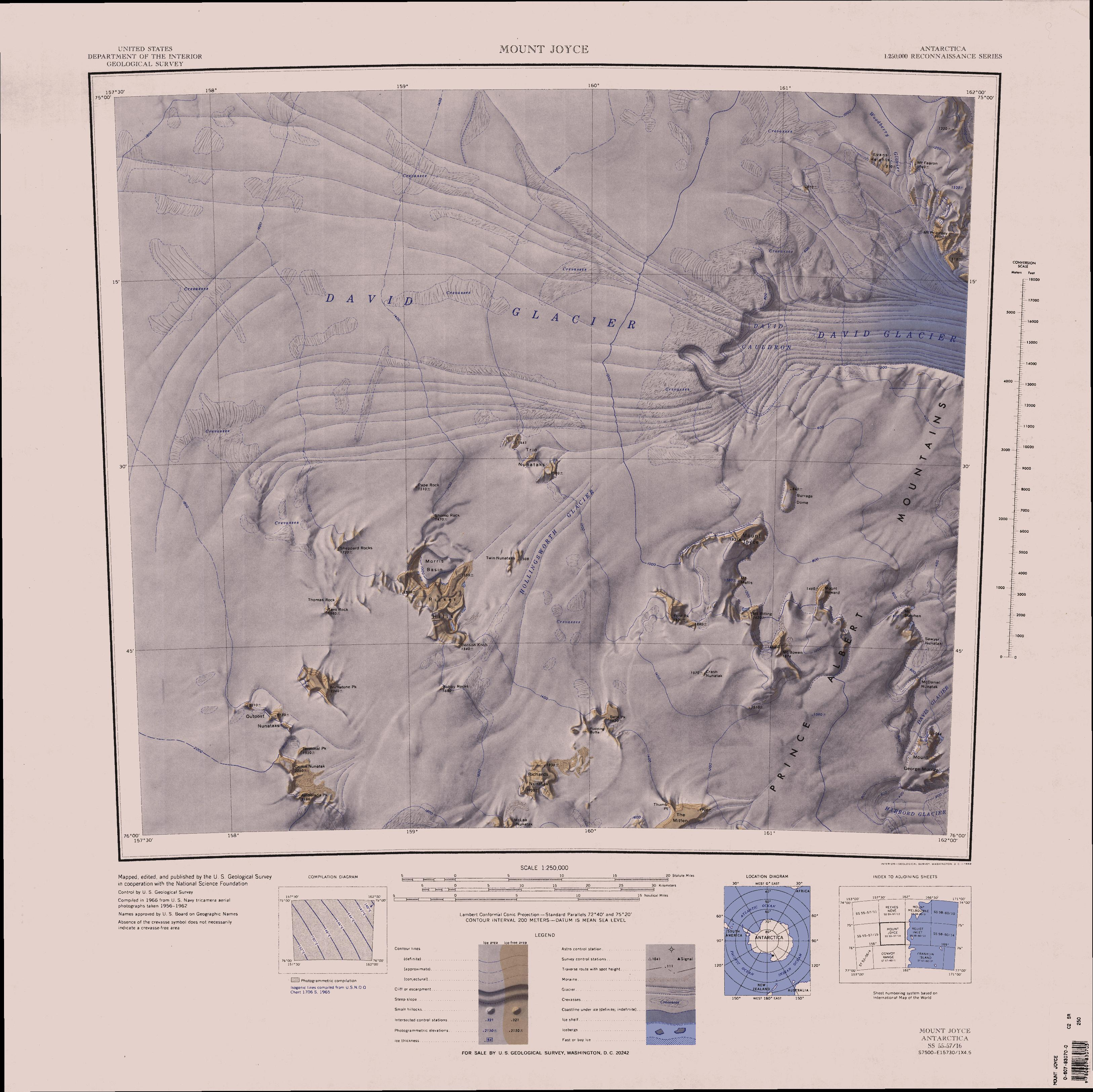
Mount Joyce in southeast of map

Mount Joyce is south of David Cauldron in the David Glacier and east of Hollingsworth Glacier. The Ricker Hills lie to the west. Nearby features include Burrage Dome to the northeast, Mount Mallis, Mount Howard, Mount Billing and Mount Bowen to the southeast, and Crash Nunatak and Ford Peak to the southwest.

== Geology ==
Mount Joyce, along with nearby nunataks, such as the Trio Nunataks, represents the remnants of a tableland of the Jurassic Ferrar Group, which consists of Kirkpatrick lavas and Ferrar dolerite sills, alternating with rafts of sandstone of the Paleozoic and Mesozoic Beacon Supergroup. The strata dip about 1-2 degrees (at most) to the west. On Mount Joyce only three major dolerite sills are observed, with two thin interleaving seams of Beacon sediments.

== Features ==
=== Burrage Dome ===
75°33′S 161°05′E. A mainly ice-covered dome, 840 metres (2,760 ft) high, standing 4 nautical miles (7.4 km; 4.6 mi) northeast of the summit of Mount Joyce. Mapped by the United States Geological Survey (USGS) from surveys and United States Navy air photos, 1956-62. Named by United States Advisory Committee on Antarctic Names (US-ACAN) for Roy E. Burrage, Jr., construction mechanic with the South Pole Station winter party, 1966.

=== Mount Mallis ===
75°40′S 160°48′E. A mountain, 1,360 metres (4,460 ft) high, midway between Mount Joyce and Mount Billing in the Prince Albert Mountains, Victoria Land. Mapped by USGS from surveys and United States Navy air photos, 1956-62. Named by US-ACAN for Robert R. Mallis, geomagnetist/seismologist with the South Pole Station winter party, 1966.

=== Mount Howard ===
75°40′S 161°16′E. A dark, rounded mountain, 1,460 metres (4,790 ft) high, standing 8 nautical miles (15 km; 9.2 mi) southeast of Mount Joyce. Discovered by the British National Antarctic Expedition (BrNAE), 1901-04, which named it for Lord Howard de Walden who assisted Captain Robert Falcon Scott in his experiments with sledges.

=== Mount Billing ===
75°43′S 160°54′E. A wedge-shaped mountain, 1,420 metres (4,660 ft) high, standing between Mount Mallis and Mount Bowen. Named by the New Zealand Antarctic Place-Names Committee (NZ-APC) for Graham Billing, public relations officer at Scott Base, 1962-63 and 1963-64 seasons.

=== Mount Bowen ===
75°45′S 161°03′E. A mountain of stratified sandstone capped by a sharp black peak, 1,875 metres (6,152 ft) high, standing 6 nautical miles (11 km; 6.9 mi) southwest of Mount Howard. Discovered by the BrNAE, 1901-04, which named it for the Honorable C.C. Bowen, one of the men who gave the expedition much assistance in New Zealand.

=== Crash Nunatak ===
75°47′S 160°38′E. An isolated nunatak between Beta Peak and Mount Bowen. Named by the Southern Party of the New Zealand Geological Survey Antarctic Expedition (NZGSAE), 1962-63, because the nunatak lies close to the scene of the United States Navy R4D plane crash of November 25, 1962.

=== Ford Peak ===
75°43′S 160°27′E. A rock peak, 1,830 metres (6,000 ft) high, standing 6.5 nautical miles (12.0 km; 7.5 mi) west of Mount Billing. Named by the Southern Party of NZGSAE, 1962-63, for M.R.J. Ford, asst. surveyor with that party, who had wintered over at Scott Base in 1962.

== Sources ==
- Alberts, Fred G., ed. (1995), Geographic Names of the Antarctic (PDF) (2 ed.), United States Board on Geographic Names This article incorporates public domain material from websites or documents of the United States Board on Geographic Names.
- Mount Joyce, USGS: United States Geographic Board
- Worner, G. (1992), "Kirkpatrick Lavas, Exposure Hill Formation and Ferrar Sills in the Prince Albert Mountains, Victoria Land, Antarctica", Polarforschung, 60: 87–90

This article incorporates public domain material from websites or documents of the United States Geological Survey.
