= Mount Priestley =

Mount Priestley may refer to:

- Mount Priestley (Antarctica)
- Mount Priestley (British Columbia) in British Columbia, Canada
