= 1984 Special Honours (New Zealand) =

Awards list for New Zealand

The 1984 Special Honours in New Zealand was a Special Honours List, published on 24 May 1984, in which six people were awarded the Polar Medal, for good services as members of New Zealand expeditions to Antarctica in recent years.

== Polar Medal ==
- Allan John Dawrant – of Invercargill; radio technician, 1975–1976.
- James Sidney Rankin – of Kumara; base engineer, 1976–1977.
- Dr David Norman Bryant Skinner – of Auckland; geologist, 1977–1978.
- John Reuben Thomson – of Temuka; base engineer, 1977–1978.
- Kevin McIntyre Weatherall – of Dunedin; science technician, 1976–1977.
- Michael Roger Wing – of Auckland; driller/field assistant, 1975–1976.
