= Prince Albert Mountains =

Mountain range in Victoria Land, Antarctica

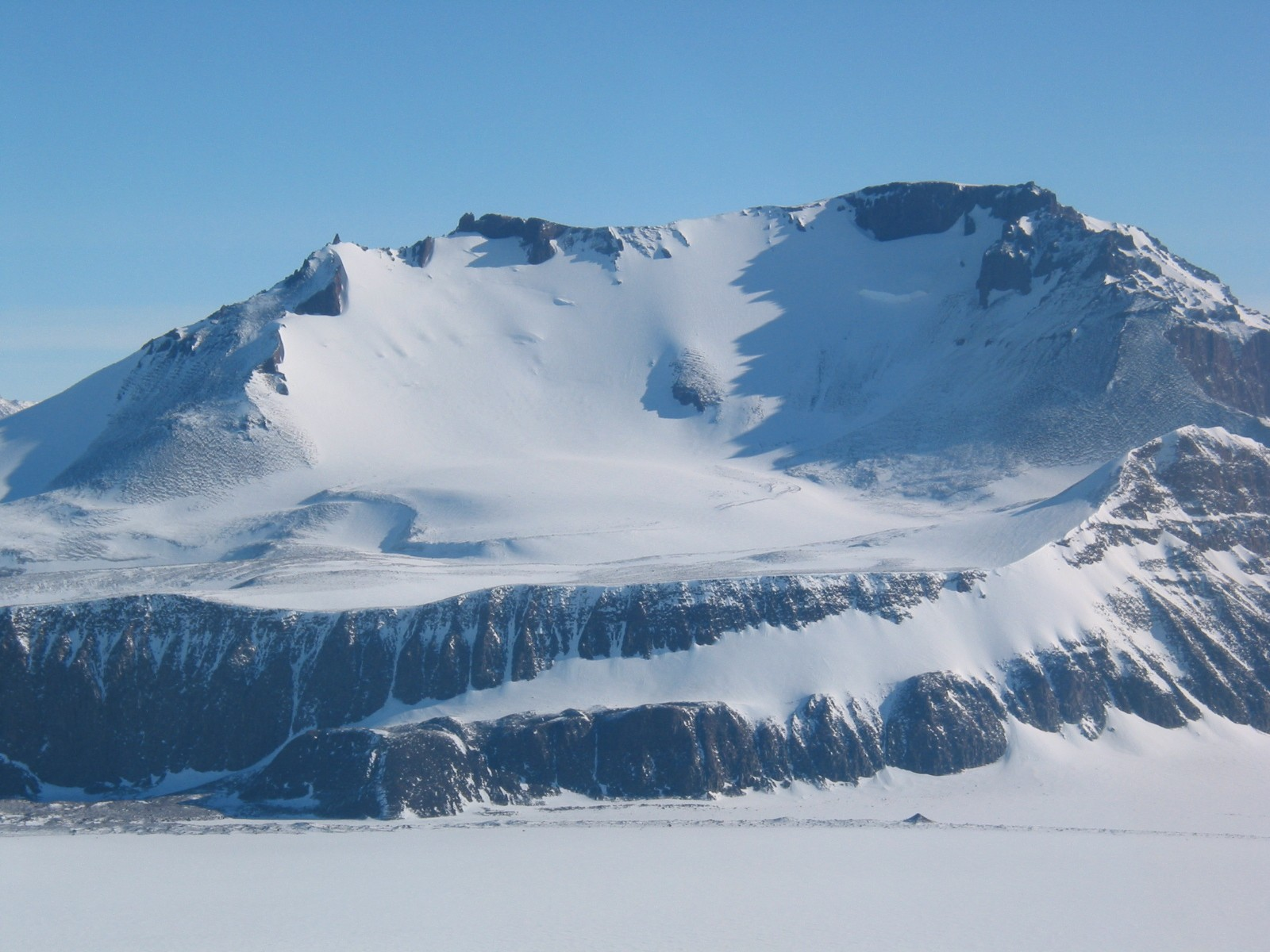
- Mount Joyce

Highest point
- Elevation: 2,300 m (7,500 ft)
- Coordinates: 76°00′S 161°30′E

Geography
- Location within Antarctica
- Continent: Antarctica
- Region(s): Victoria Land, Antarctica
- Parent range: Transantarctic Mountains

The Prince Albert Mountains (76°00′S 161°30′E) are a major mountain group in Antarctica over 200 nautical miles (370 km; 230 mi) long. Located in Victoria Land, they run north–south between the Priestley Glacier to the north and Ferrar Glacier to the south. (Note: The USGS description, saying the Prince Albert Mountains extend to the Ferrar Glacier, is confusing. The Mawson Glacier seems to be the southern limit. On their maps, the USGS shows the mountains south of Mawson Glacier as Kirkwood Range near the coast and Convoy Range, Coombs Hills and Allan Hills further inland. South of these are the Clare Range, Saint Johns Range etc. The USGS descriptions for these ranges do not say they are part of the Prince Albert Mountains. The Ferrar Glacier is yet further south.) They are south of the Deep Freeze Range and north of the Kirkwood Range.

== Exploration and name ==
The Prince Albert Mountains were discovered by Sir James Clark Ross, on February 17, 1841, and named by him for Prince Albert, the consort of the British Queen Victoria of England. The first exploration of the mountains was by British expeditions in the early 1900s. Detailed survey and mapping was accomplished by New Zealand and American expeditions in the 1950s and 1960s.

== Location ==
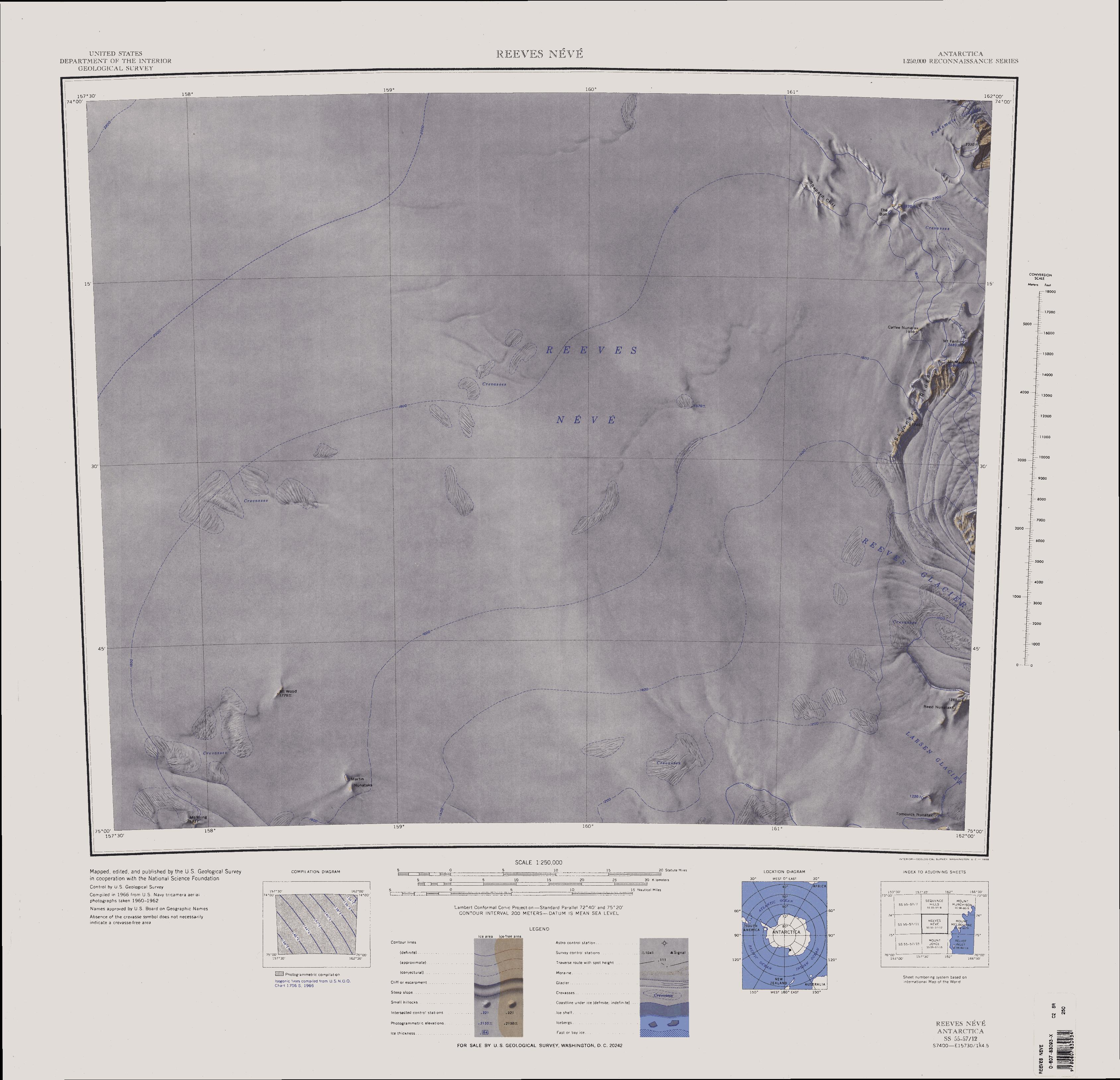
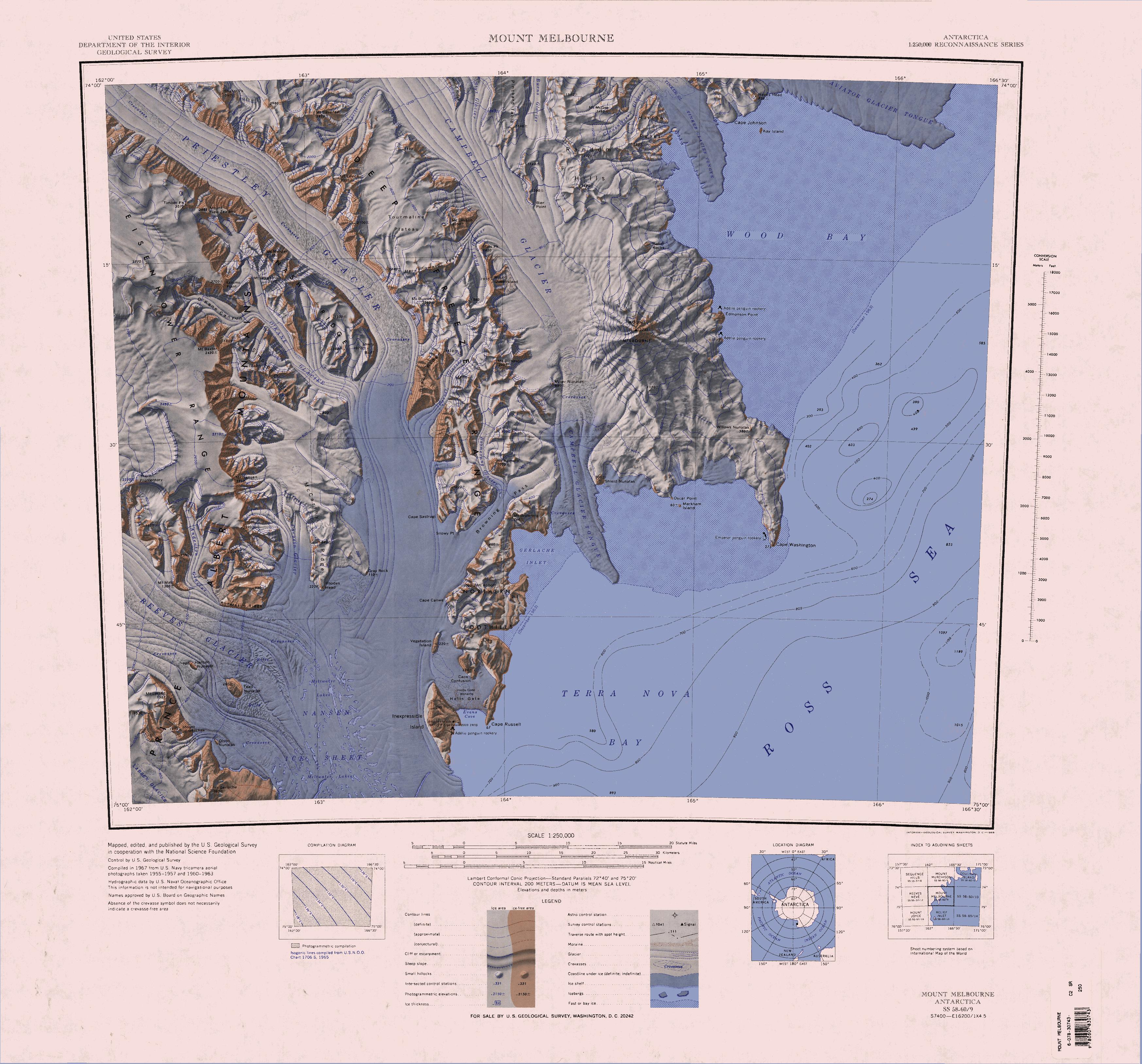

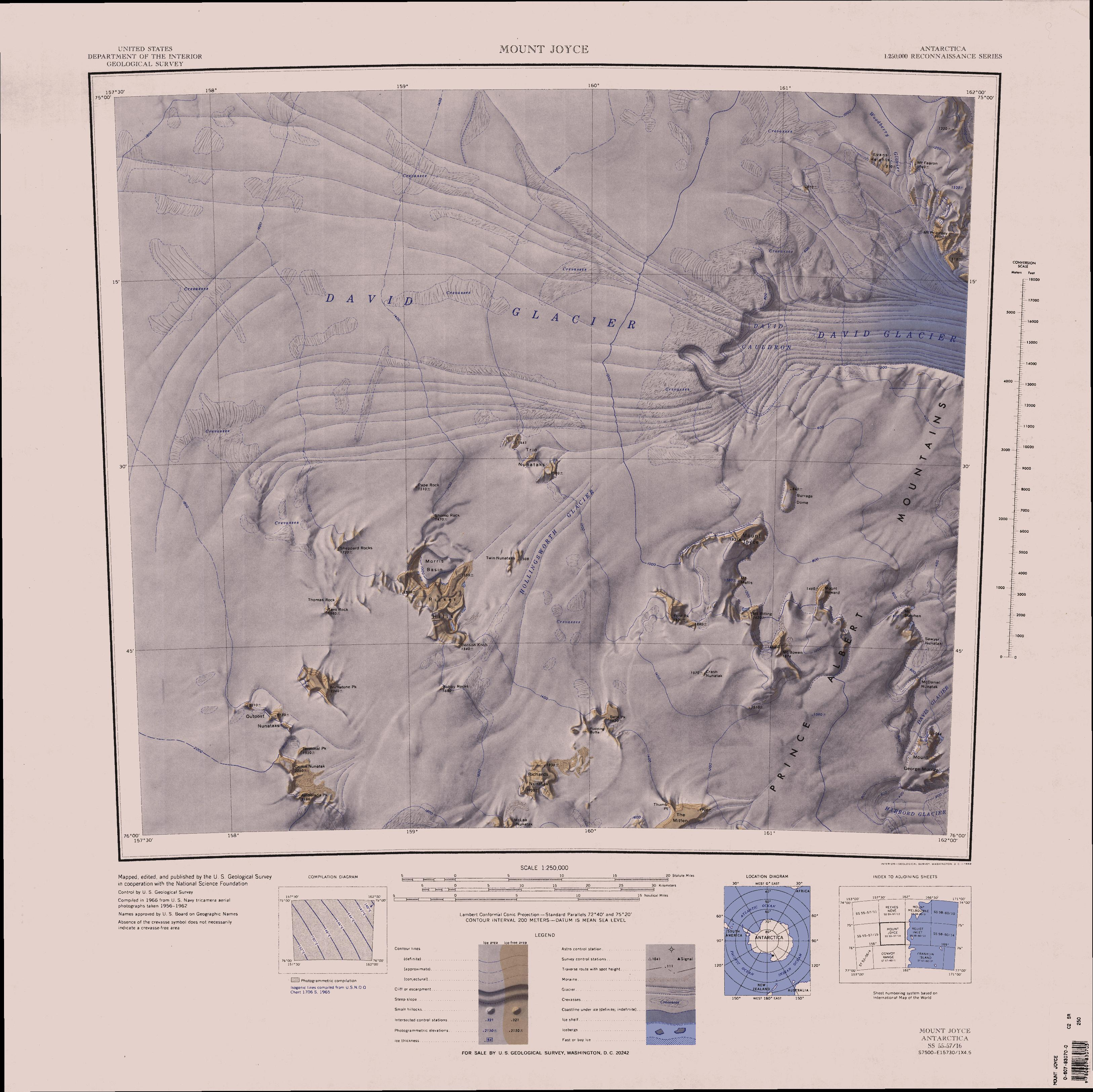
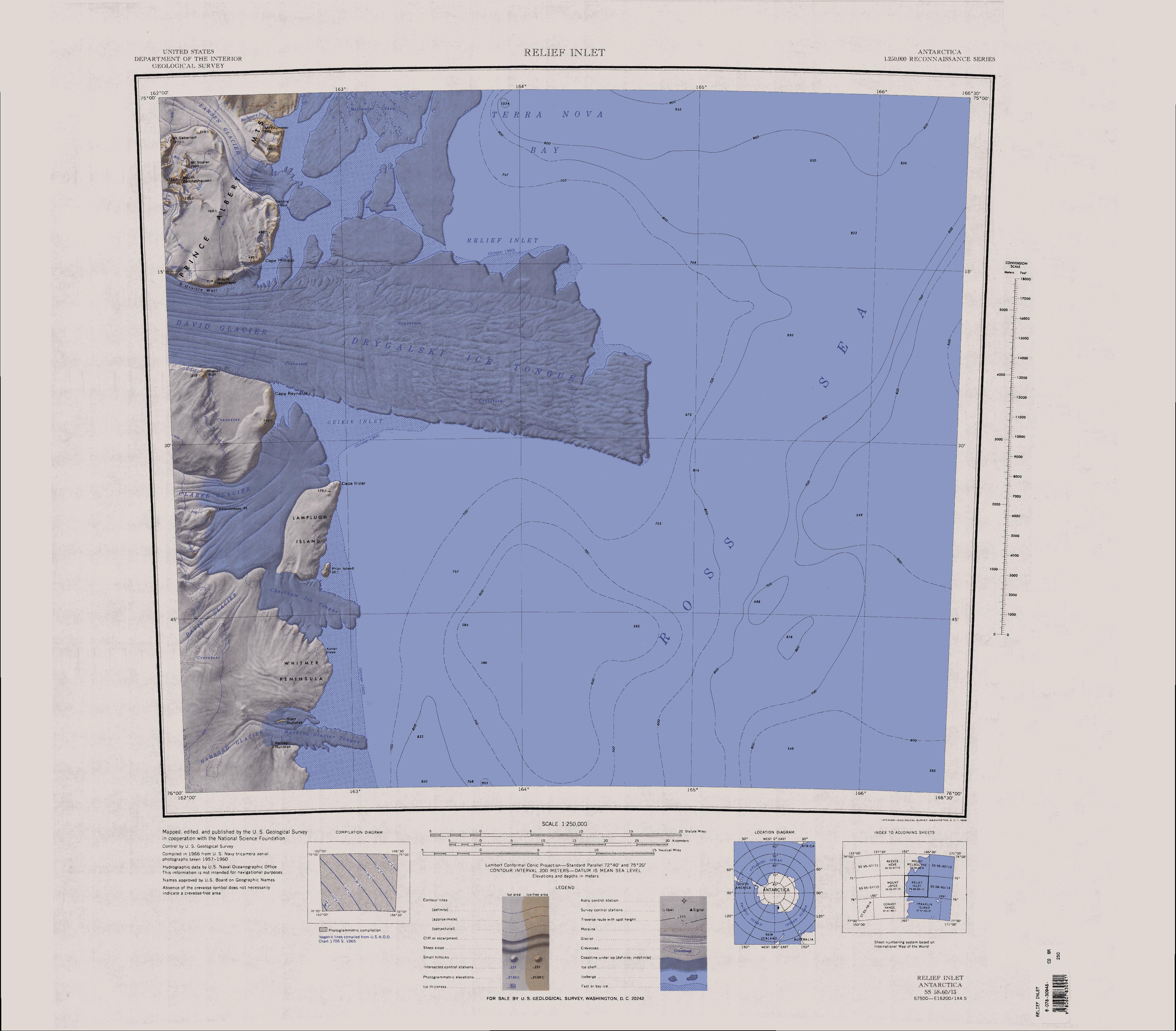
Prince Albert Mountains extends from southwest to northeast

The northeastern section of the Prince Albert Mountains extends across the Reeves Glacier north to the Priestley Glacier. These two glacier converge into the Nansen Ice Sheet. Further south, they cross the David Glacier and Larsen Glacier. In the far south they extend to the Mawson Glacier. In the southwest the Reeves Névé extends to their west. The Ricker Hills are in the northwest of the range, between Hollingsworth Glacier and upper David Glacier.

== Major peaks ==
This range include the following mountains:

Mountain	metres	feet
Mount Mackintosh	2,468	8,087
Mount Joyce	1,830	6,000
Mount Billing	1,420	4,700
Mount Mallis	1,360	4,462
Mount Priestley	1,100	3,600

== Major glaciers ==
Major glaciers, from north to south, include:

- Priestley Glacier is a major valley glacier, about 60 nautical miles (110 km; 69 mi) long, originating at the edge of the Polar Plateau. The glacier drains southeast between the Deep Freeze Range and Eisenhower Range to enter the northern end of the Nansen Ice Sheet.
- Reeves Glacier is a broad glacier originating on the interior upland and descending between Eisenhower Range and Mount Larsen to merge with the Nansen Ice Sheet.
- Larsen Glacier is a glacier flowing southeast from Reeves Névé, through the Prince Albert Mountains and entering the Ross Sea just south of Mount Crummer.
- David Glacier is a glacier over 60 nautical miles (110 km; 69 mi) long, flowing east from the polar plateau through the Prince Albert Mountains to the coast. It enters the Ross Sea between Cape Philippi and Cape Reynolds to form the floating Drygalski Ice Tongue.
- Mawson Glacier is a large glacier descending eastward from the Antarctic Plateau to the north of Trinity Nunatak and the Kirkwood Range, to enter the Ross Sea, where it forms the Nordenskjöld Ice Tongue.

== Features ==
Features or groups of features in the Prince Albert Mountains have been named by various survey groups and expeditions. From north to south they include:

- Eisenhower Range (74°15′S 162°15′E), a majestic mountain range, about 45 nautical miles (83 km; 52 mi) long and rising to 3,070 metres (10,070 ft), which rises between Reeves Névé on the west, Reeves Glacier on the south, and Priestley Glacier on the north and east.
- Mount Bellingshausen' (75°7′S 162°6′E), a conspicuous cone-shaped mountain, 1,380 metres (4,530 ft) high, standing 5 nautical miles (9.3 km; 5.8 mi) northeast of Mount Priestley between Larsen Glacier and David Glacier.
- Mount Joyce (75°36′S 160°49′E), a prominent, dome-shaped mountain, 1,830 metres (6,000 ft) high, standing 8 nautical miles (15 km) northwest of Mount Howard.
- Ricker Hills (75°41′S 159°10′E), a group of mainly ice-free hills, about 9 nautical miles (17 km; 10 mi) long, lying just west of Hollingsworth Glacier.
- Mount Armytage (76°02′S 160°45′E), a dome-shaped mountain, 1,855 metres (6,086 ft) high, standing north of Mawson Glacier and 14 nautical miles (26 km; 16 mi) west of Mount Smith.
- Mount Murray (76°09′S 161°50′E), a sharp granite peak, 1,005 metres (3,297 ft) high, standing 8 nautical miles (15 km; 9.2 mi) west of Bruce Point on the north side of Mawson Glacier.

== Sources ==
- Alberts, Fred G., ed. (1995), Geographic Names of the Antarctic (PDF) (2 ed.), United States Board on Geographic Names This article incorporates public domain material from websites or documents of the United States Board on Geographic Names.
- Convoy Range, USGS: United States Geographic Board
- Mount Joyce, USGS: United States Geographic Board
- Mount Melbourne, USGS: United States Geographic Board
- Reeves Névé, USGS: United States Geographic Board
- Relief Inlet, USGS: United States Geographic Board

This article incorporates public domain material from websites or documents of the United States Geological Survey.
