= Mount Bellingshausen =

Mountain in Ross Dependency, Antarctica

- Location within Antarctica

Highest point
- Elevation: 1,380 m (4,530 ft)
- Prominence: 154 m (505 ft)
- Coordinates: 75°7′S 162°6′E

Geography
- Continent: Antarctica
- Region(s): Victoria Land, Antarctica
- Parent range: Prince Albert Mountains

Mount Bellingshausen (75°7′S 162°6′E) is a conspicuous cone-shaped mountain, 1,380 metres (4,530 ft) high, standing 5 nautical miles (9.3 km; 5.8 mi) northeast of Mount Priestley between Larsen Glacier and David Glacier, in the Prince Albert Mountains of Victoria Land, Antarctica. Mount Bellingshausen was discovered by the Discovery expedition, 1901–04, led by Robert Falcon Scott, and named by him after Admiral Thaddeus Bellingshausen, leader of the Russian expedition of 1819–21.

== Location ==
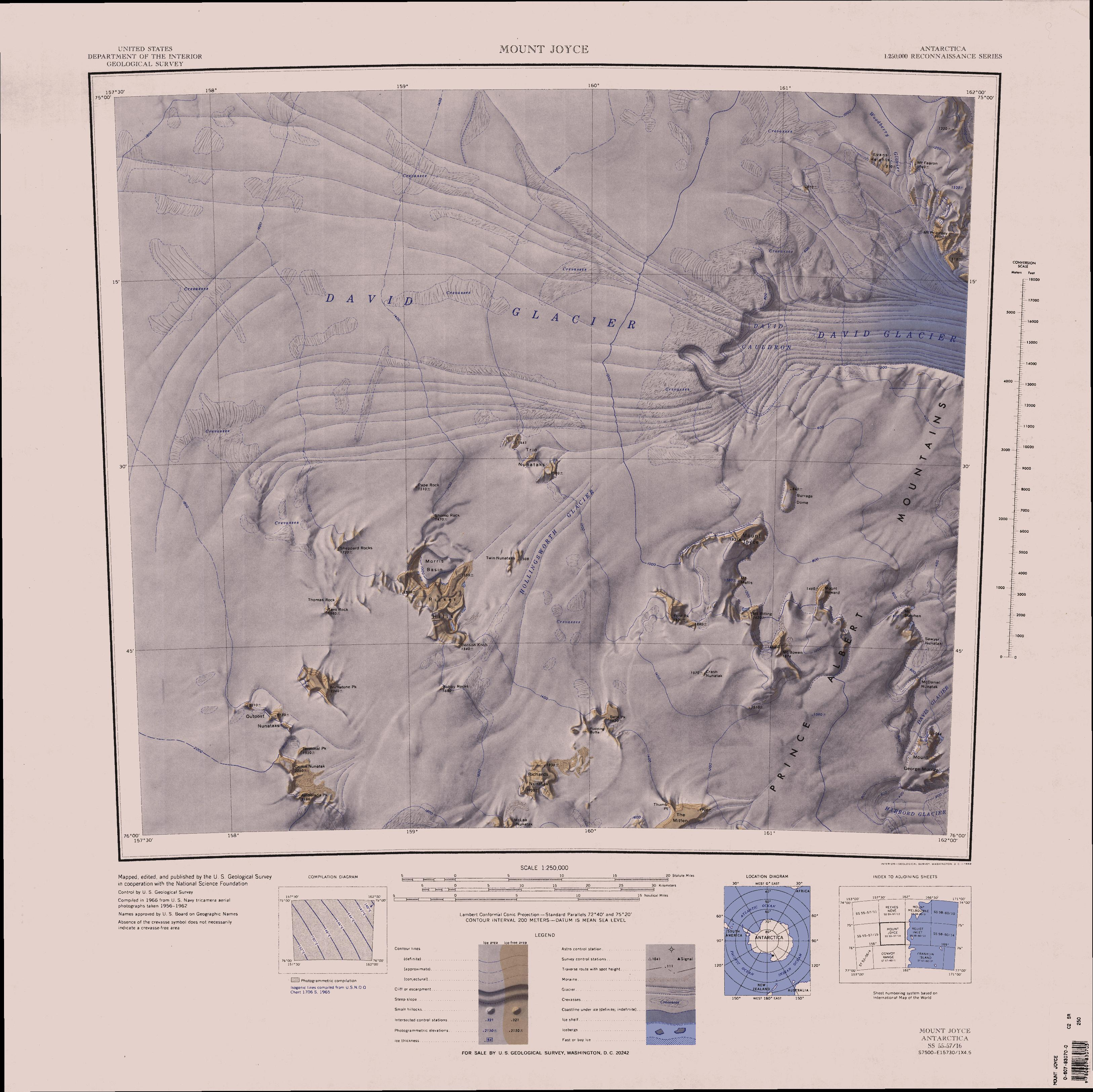
Western features to the northeast of the map

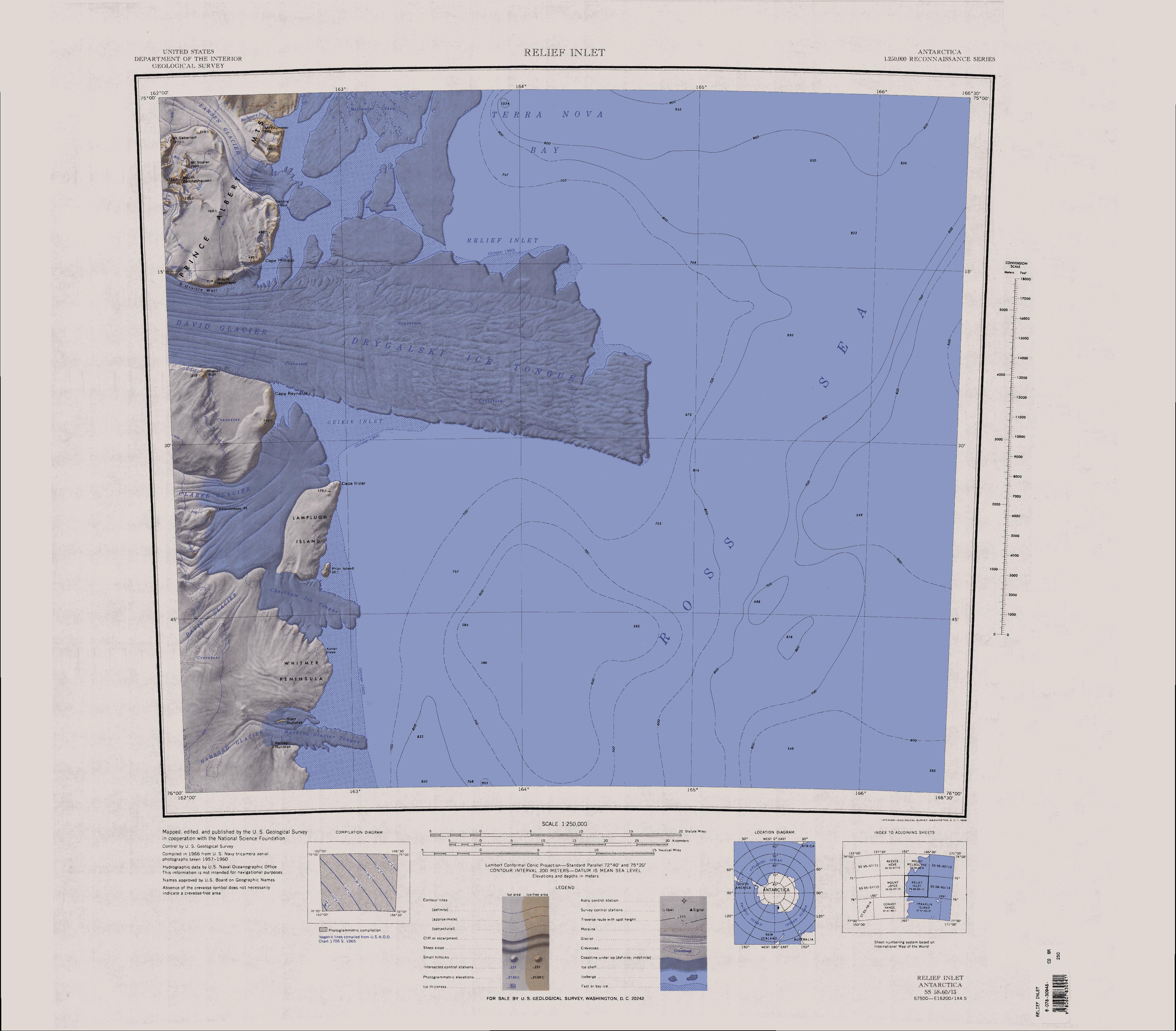
Eastern features to the northwest of the map

Mount Bellinghausen is south of the Larsen Glacier and north of the David Glacier, near the mouths of both glaciers on the Ross Sea. Nearby features include Fleming Head, Cape Philippi, Mount Neumayer and the D'Urville Wall on the coast, Mount Crummer on the east side of the Larsen Glacier, Mount Stierer and Mount Gaberlein to the north, Mount Fearon and Evans Heights to the west and Mount Priestley (Antarctica)|Mount Priestley to the southwest.

== Features ==
=== Mount Neumayer ===
75°16′S 162°17′E. A mountain 720 metres (2,360 ft) high surmounting D'Urville Wall on the north side of the terminus of David Glacier. Discovered by the British National Antarctic Expedition (BrNAE), 1901-04, under Scott, who named this feature for Georg von Neumayer, German geophysicist, who was active in organizing Antarctic exploration.

=== Mount Crummer ===
75°03′S 162°34′E. A massive, brown granite mountain, 895 metres (2,936 ft) high, immediately south of Backstairs Passage Glacier. First charted and named by the British Antarctic Expedition, 1907–09 (BrAE), under Ernest Shackleton.

=== Mount Stierer ===
75°06′S 162°09′E. A mountain 1,080 metres (3,540 ft) high rising 1.5 nautical miles (2.8 km; 1.7 mi) north-northeast of Mount Bellingshausen. Mapped by the United States Geological Survey (USGS) from surveys and United States Navy air photos, 1957-62. Named by the United States Advisory Committee on Antarctic Names (US-ACAN) after Byron A. Stierer, Airman First Class, United States Air Force, a member of the McMurdo Station wintering party, 1962.

=== Mount Gaberlein ===
75°04′S 162°04′E. A mountain, 1,210 metres (3,970 ft) high, standing 3.5 nautical miles (6.5 km; 4.0 mi) north-northwest of Mount Bellingshausen. Mapped by USGS from surveys and United States Navy air photos, 1957-62. Named by US-ACAN for William E. Gaberlein, Chief Construction Electrician, United States Navy, who wintered over at McMurdo Station in 1962 and 1964.

=== Mount Fearon ===
75°05′S 161°42′E. A mountain, 1,140 metres (3,740 ft) high, rising at the east side of Woodberry Glacier, 6 nautical miles (11 km; 6.9 mi) northwest of Mount Priestley. Mapped by USGS from surveys and United States Navy air photos, 1956-62. Named by US-ACAN for Colin E. Fearon, biologist at McMurdo Station, summer 1962-63.

=== Evans Heights ===
75°06′S 161°33′E. Small rock heights on the west side of the mouth of Woodberry Glacier. Mapped by USGS from surveys and United States Navy air photos, 1956-62. Named by US-ACAN for John P. Evans, field assistant at McMurdo Station, 1964-65.

=== Mount Priestley ===
75°11′S 161°53′E. A mountain, 1,100 metres (3,600 ft) high, rising at the north side of David Glacier, 5 nautical miles (9.3 km; 5.8 mi) southwest of Mount Bellingshausen. First mapped by the BrAE, 1907-09, which named it for Raymond Priestley, geologist with the expedition, who was later a member of the BrAE, 1910-13.

== Sources ==
- Alberts, Fred G., ed. (1995), Geographic Names of the Antarctic (PDF) (2 ed.), United States Board on Geographic Names This article incorporates public domain material from websites or documents of the United States Board on Geographic Names.
- Mount Joyce, USGS: United States Geological Survey
- Relief Inlet, USGS: United States Geological Survey

This article incorporates public domain material from websites or documents of the United States Geological Survey.
