= Larsen Glacier =

Glacier in Victoria Land, Antarctica

- Location within Antarctica
- Location: Victoria Land
- Coordinates: 75°6′S 162°28′E
- Terminus: Ross Sea

The Larsen Glacier (75°6′S 162°28′E) is a glacier flowing southeast from Reeves Névé, through the Prince Albert Mountains and entering the Ross Sea just south of Mount Crummer in Victoria Land, Antarctica.

== Exploration and naming ==
The Larsen Glacier was discovered by the South Magnetic Party of Ernest Shackleton's British Antarctic Expedition, 1907–09, who followed its course on their way to the plateau area beyond. They named it Larsen Glacier because it flowed past the foot of Mount Larsen, which was constantly in view as they ascended the course of the glacier.

== Location ==
The Larsen Glacier forms to the southeast of Reeves Névé between the Reed Nunataks and Tomovick Nunatak. It flows southeast past Widowmaker Pass and Mount Gerlache in the Prince Albert Mountains. It continues past the mouth of Backstairs Passage Glacier and Mount Crummer to the north, and Fleming Head to the south, to enter Relief Inlet in the Terra Nova Bay.

== Features ==
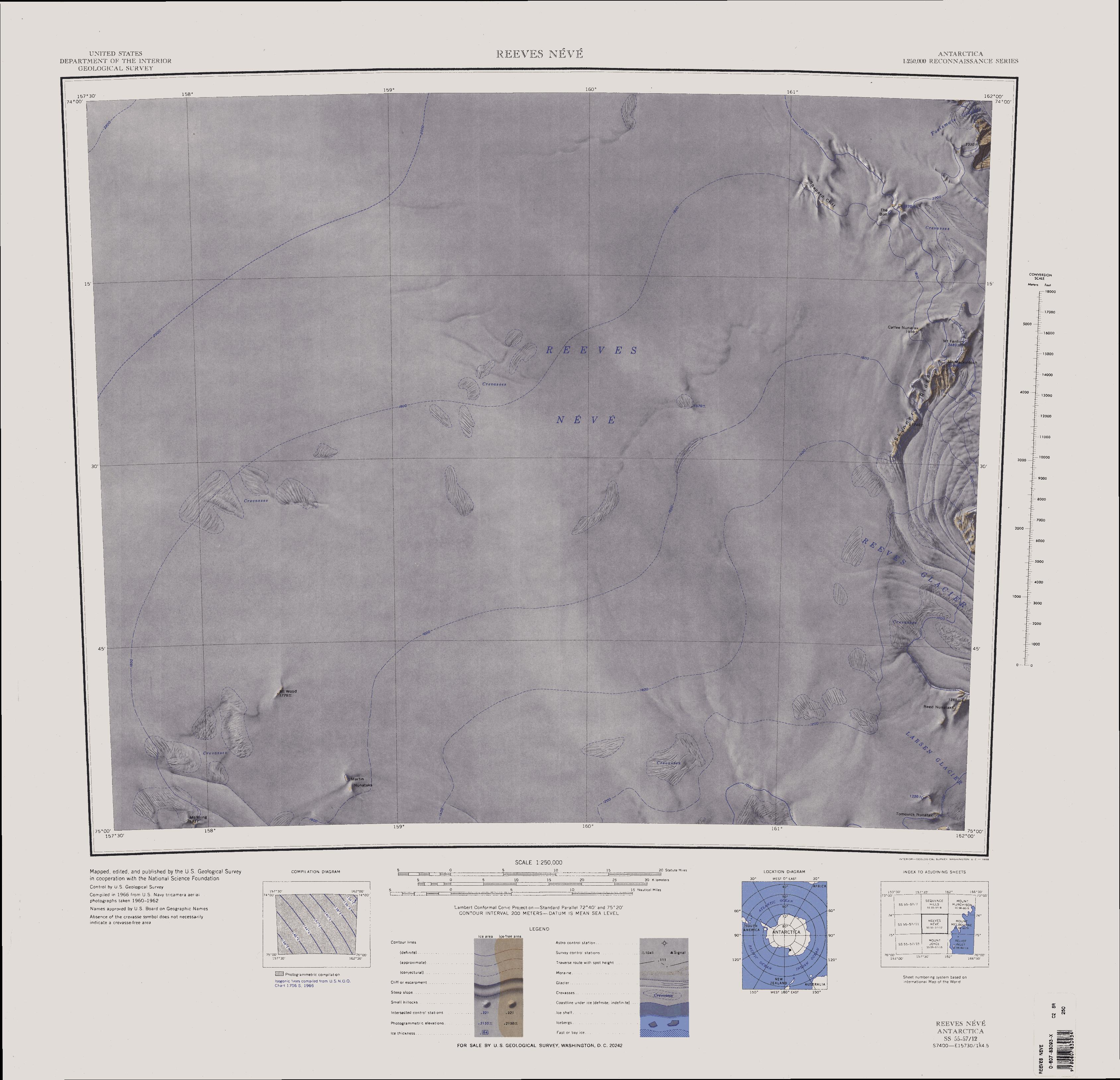
Upper part of glacier southeast corner of map

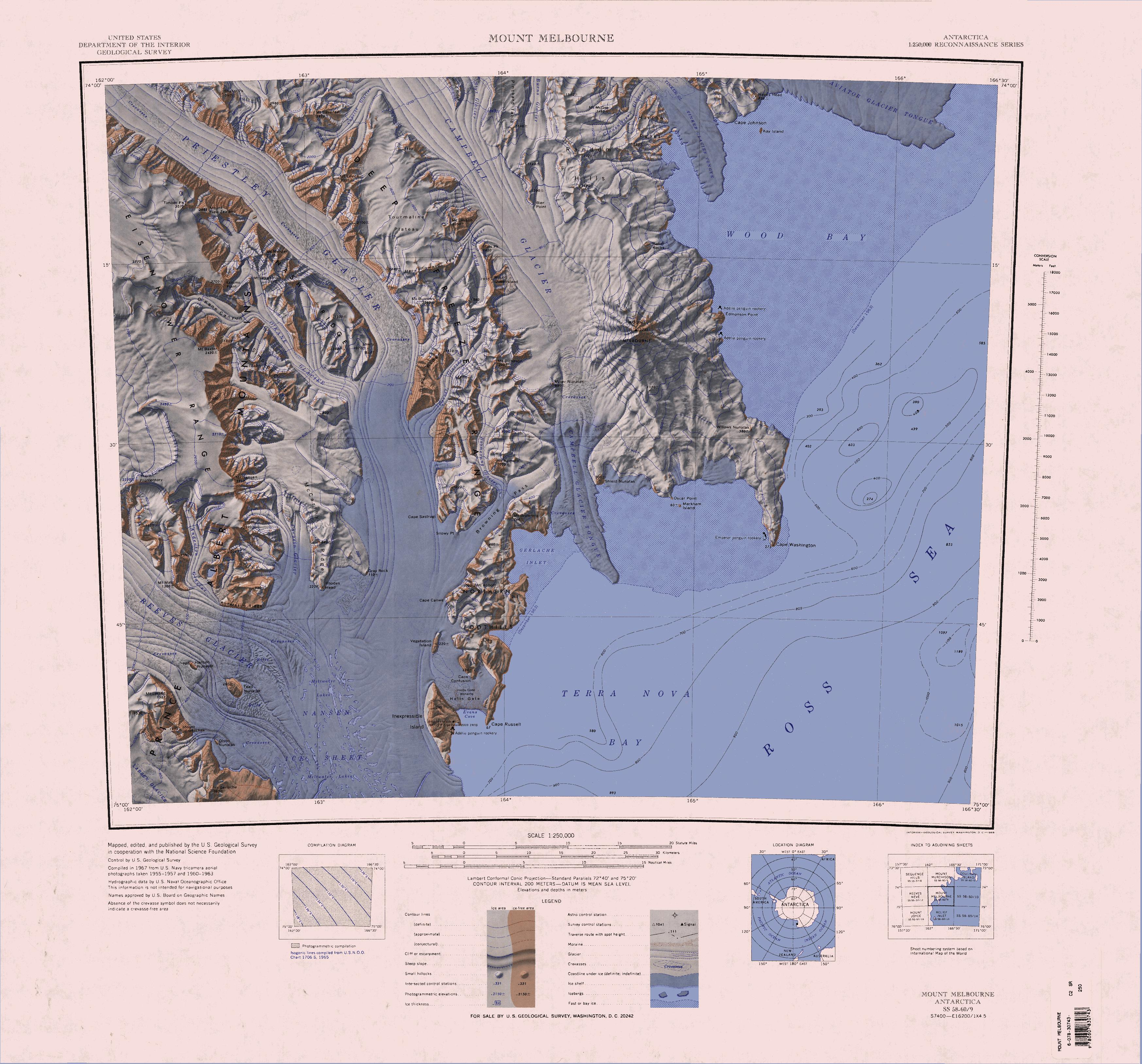
Middle section southwest corner of map

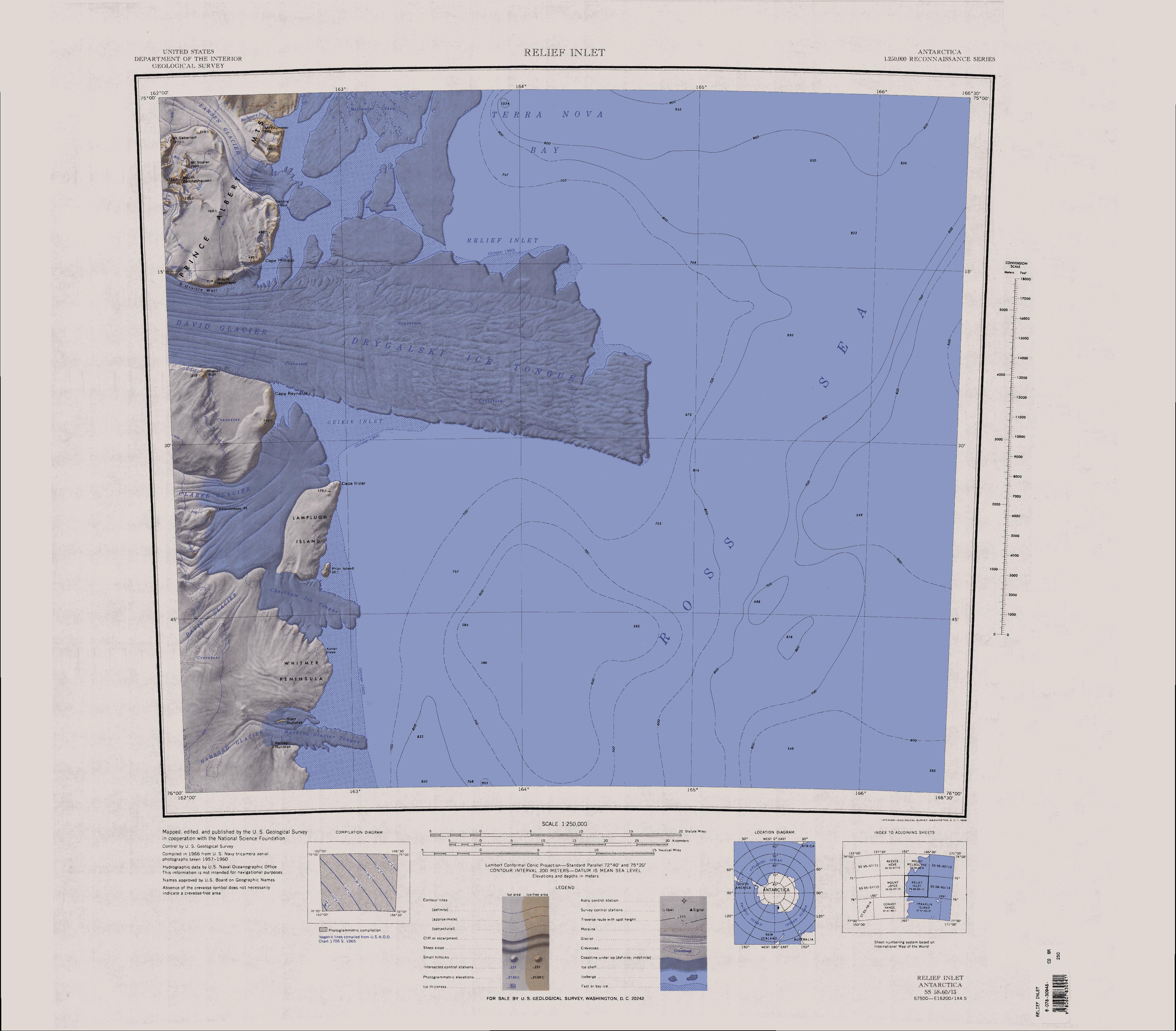
Lower section northwest corner of map

Features of the glacier and the terrain it flows through include:

=== Reed Nunataks ===
74°49′S 161°58′E. A cluster of nunataks that form a divide between the upper portions of the Reeves Glacier and Larsen Glacier, 6 nautical miles (11 km; 6.9 mi) west of Hansen Nunatak. Mapped by USGS from surveys and United States Navy aerial photographs, 1956-62. Named by US-ACAN for David Reed, USGS Topographic Engineer at McMurdo Station, 1964-65.

=== Tomovick Nunatak ===
74°59′S 161°51′E. A nunatak along the southern side of the upper portion of Larsen Glacier, 9 nautical miles (17 km; 10 mi) west of Mount Gerlache. Mapped by the United States Geological Survey (USGS) from surveys and United States Navy air photos, 1956-62. Named by the United States Advisory Committee on Antarctic Names (US-ACAN) for Donald S. Tomovick, United States Navy, utilitiesman at South Pole Station in 1966.

=== Mount Gerlache ===
74°59′S 162°26′E. A prominent mountain, 980 metres (3,220 ft) high, standing on the northeast side of Larsen Glacier between Widowmaker Pass and Backstairs Passage Glacier. Discovered by the British National Antarctic Expedition, 1901-04, and named for Lieutenant Adrien de Gerlache.

=== Backstairs Passage Glacier ===
75°02′S 162°36′E. A glacier about 2 nautical miles (3.7 km; 2.3 mi) long, draining east along the north side of Mount Crummer to the Ross Sea. The Magnetic Pole Party, led by T.W. Edgeworth David, of the British Antarctic Expedition, 1907-09, ascended this glacier from the Ross Sea, then continued the ascent via Larsen Glacier to the plateau of Victoria Land. So named by David's party because of the circuitous route to get to Larsen Glacier.

=== Fleming Head ===
75°10′S 162°38′E. A prominent rock headland on the coast of Victoria Land, marking the south side of the terminus of Larsen Glacier where it enters the Ross Sea. Mapped by USGS from surveys and United States Navy air photos, 1957-62. Named by US-ACAN for John P. Fleming, Senior Chief Construction Electrician, United States Navy, a member of the McMurdo Station winter party, 1962 and 1966.

== Sources ==
- Alberts, Fred G., ed. (1995), Geographic Names of the Antarctic (PDF) (2 ed.), United States Board on Geographic Names This article incorporates public domain material from websites or documents of the United States Board on Geographic Names.
- Mount Melbourne, USGS: United States Geological Survey
- Reeves Névé, USGS: United States Geological Survey
- Relief Inlet, USGS: United States Geological Survey

This article incorporates public domain material from websites or documents of the United States Geological Survey.
