= Mount Murray (Antarctica) =

Mountain in Victoria Land, Antarctica

- Location within Antarctica

Highest point
- Coordinates: 76°09′S 161°50′E

Mount Murray (76°09′S 161°50′E) is a sharp granite peak, 1,005 metres (3,297 ft) high, standing 8 nautical miles (15 km; 9.2 mi) west of Bruce Point on the north side of Mawson Glacier in Victoria Land, Antarctica. Mount Murray was first charted by the British Antarctic Expedition, 1907–09 (BrAE) which named it for James Murray, biologist with the expedition.

== Location ==
Mount Murray is just north of the Mawson Glacier near its mouth on the Ross Sea, to the east. It is northeast of the Walker Rocks, east of Mount Brocklehurst and south of Mount Smith. It is in the Prince Albert Mountains, north of the Kirkwood Range.

== Nearby features ==
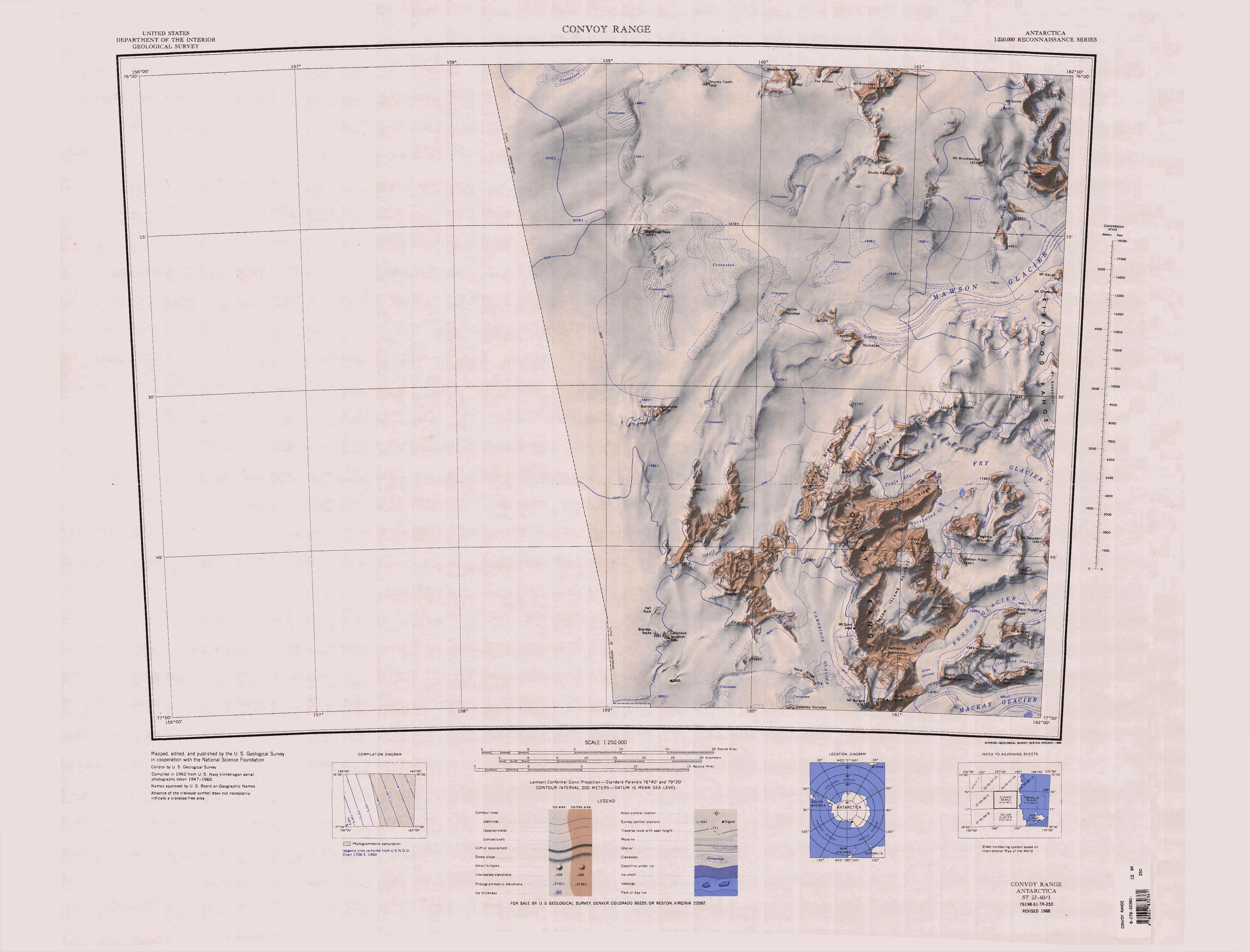
Upper section of the glacier (to the north)

=== Walker Rocks ===
76°14′S 161°36′E. A group of high rocks, about 3 nautical miles (5.6 km; 3.5 mi) in extent, lying 3 nautical miles (5.6 km; 3.5 mi) southwest of Mount Murray near the mouth of Mawson Glacier. Named by the United States Advisory Committee on Antarctic Names (US-ACAN) in 1964 for Carson B. Walker, utility man at South Pole Station, 1961.

=== Mount Brocklehurst ===
76°08′S 161°27′E. Dome-shaped mountain, 1,310 metres (4,300 ft) high, standing north of Mawson Glacier and 6 nautical miles (11 km; 6.9 mi) west of Mount Murray. First charted by the BrAE (1907-09) which named it for Sir Philip Lee Brocklehurst, who contributed to the expedition and was assistant geologist on it.

=== Mount Smith ===
76°03′S 161°42′E. Peak over 1,400 metres (4,600 ft) high, standing north of Mawson Glacier and 7 nautical miles (13 km; 8.1 mi) north-northwest of Mount Murray. Discovered by the British National Antarctic Expedition (BrNAE; 1901-04) which probably named this peak for W.E. Smith, Chief Naval Constructor, who prepared the plans and supervised construction of the expedition ship Discovery.

== Sources ==
- Alberts, Fred G., ed. (1995), Geographic Names of the Antarctic (PDF) (2 ed.), United States Board on Geographic Names This article incorporates public domain material from websites or documents of the United States Board on Geographic Names.
- Convoy Range, USGS: United States Geological Survey

This article incorporates public domain material from websites or documents of the United States Geological Survey.
