= Drygalski Ice Tongue =

Glacier in Antarctica

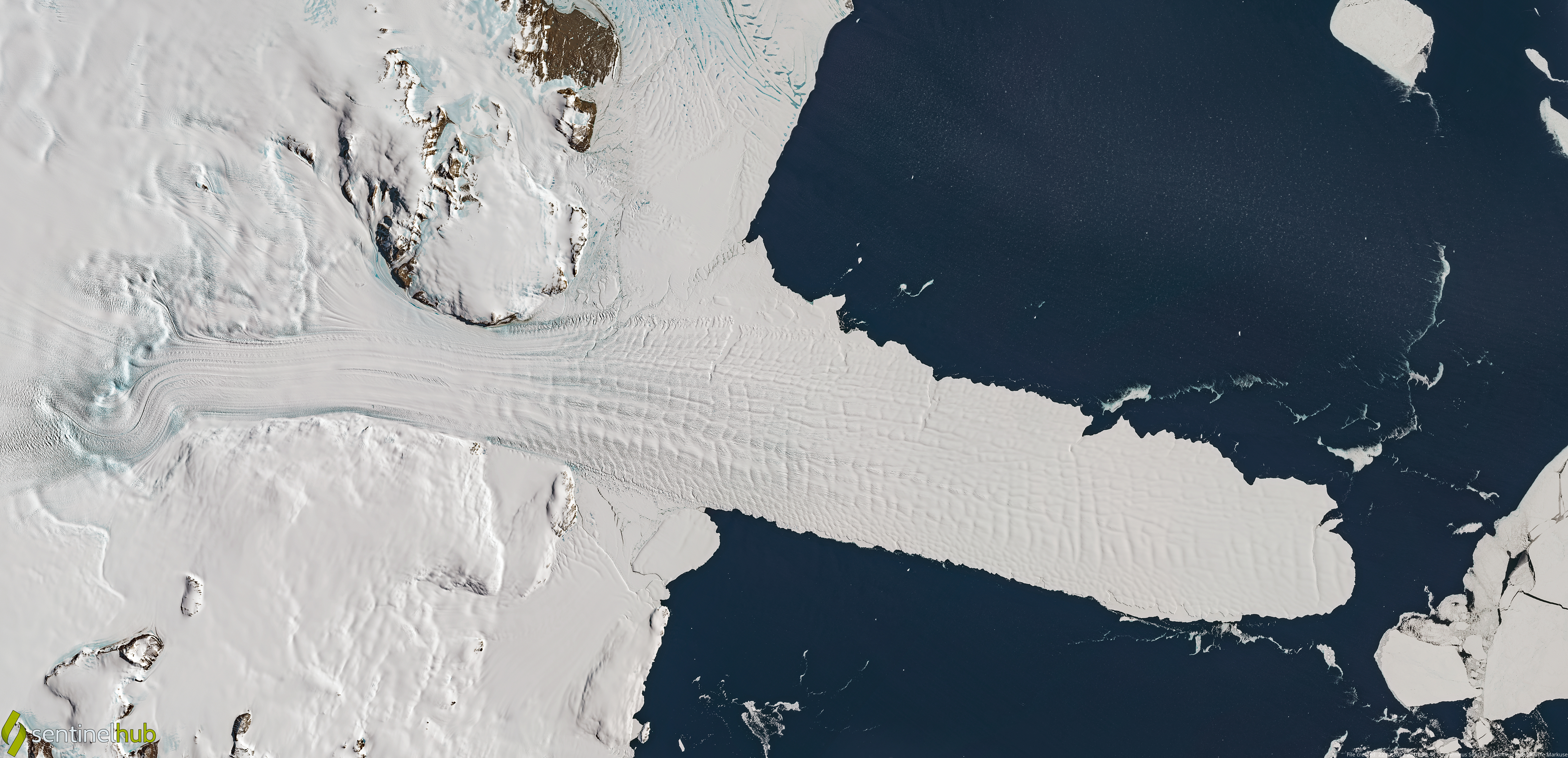
- Drygalski Ice Tongue in McMurdo Sound, Antarctica on January 6th, 2022

- Location within Antarctica
- Type: Ice tongue
- Location: Victoria Land, East Antarctica
- Coordinates: 75°24′S 163°30′E
- Length: 48 kilometres (30 mi)
- Width: 14 to 24 kilometres (9 to 15 mi)

The Drygalski Ice Tongue, Drygalski Barrier, or Drygalski Glacier Tongue is a glacier in Antarctica, on the Scott Coast, in the northern McMurdo Sound of Ross Dependency, 240 kilometres (150 mi) north of Ross Island. The Drygalski Ice Tongue is stable by the standards of Antarctica's ice floes, and stretches 70 kilometres (43 mi) out to sea from the David Glacier, reaching the sea from a valley in the Prince Albert Mountains of Victoria Land. The Drygalski Ice Tongue ranges from 14 to 24 kilometres (9 to 15 mi) wide.

Captain Robert Falcon Scott, leader of the British National Antarctic Expedition (1901-1904), discovered the Drygalski Ice Tongue in January 1902 and named it for Professor Erich von Drygalski, a contemporary German explorer then in Antarctica. The glacier that feeds the ice tongue was named after Edgeworth David. David and Douglas Mawson crossed the ice tongue in 1908/09 as part of the Nimrod Expedition. The Terra Nova Northern Party expedition did the same in 1912 during their return journey to Cape Evans. The name Drygalski Ice Tongue is unusual, as it is now common to give the same name to a glacier and its glacier tongue and refer to the seaward extension as a glacier tongue.

The Drygalski Ice Tongue is thought to be at least 4,000 years old. The recent history of the combined glacier and ice tongue used analysis of rocks deposited along the margin of the David Glacier to identify a rapid thinning event initiated over 7,000 years ago that endured for ~ 2,000 years.

The David Glacier grounding line, where the ice leaves the shore and begins to float, is in a depth of ~1,900 m (6,200 ft). The floating ice tongue itself is a significant factor contributing to the frequent formation of the Terra Nova Bay polynya. The polynya enables both production of sea ice and high salinity seawater. The floating ice is in places only 300 m thick, with between 300 and 900 m (980 and 2,950 ft) of ocean beneath.

The floating glacier also forms the southern bound of the Nansen Ice Shelf. This small ice shelf is subject to strong katabatic winds. It is also possible to observe free-flowing meltwater on its surface in summer conditions. In 2016 a 30 km (19 mi) long section of the ice shelf calved to form two large icebergs.

On March–April 2005, a 3,000 square kilometres (1,200 sq mi) iceberg designated B-15A hit the ice tongue breaking off two chunks, each with a surface area of about 70 square kilometres (27 sq mi). This iceberg is a remnant of Iceberg B-15, which calved from the Ross Ice Shelf in 2000. Scientists are also concerned for several penguin colonies which have been isolated from the open sea by the two large bodies of ice. At the end of March 2006, another iceberg coming from the Ross Ice Shelf, named C-16, hit the ice tongue, breaking off another large piece (more than 100 square kilometres or 39 square miles). Both of these incidents are described in a study that benefited from the fortuitous presence of a GPS beacon on one of the icebergs.

== See also ==
- Drygalski Basin
- List of glaciers in the Antarctic
- Erebus Glacier Tongue
- List of glaciers
- McMurdo Sound
