= David Glacier =

Glacier in Antarctica

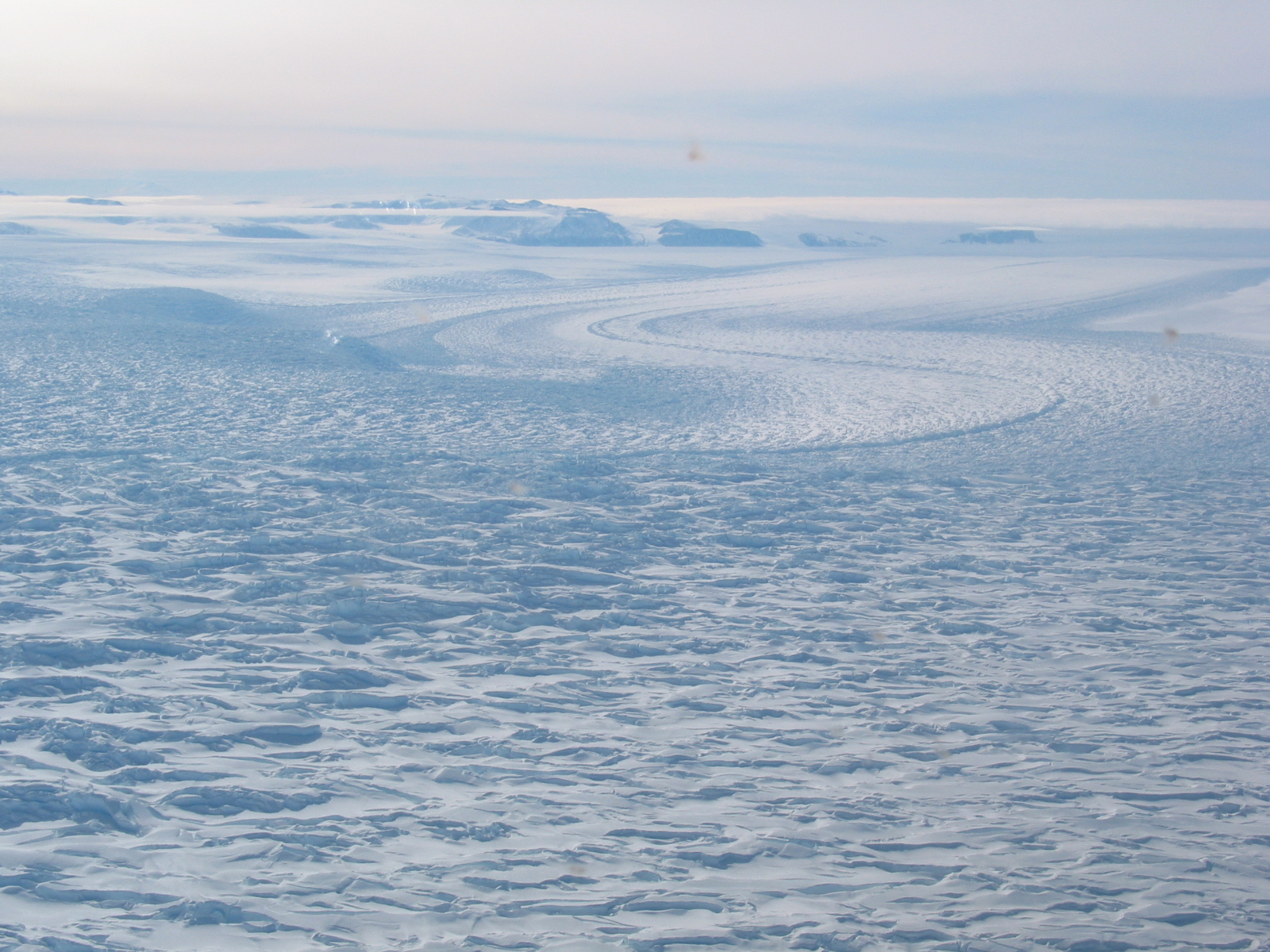
- The David Cauldron, looking towards the east, with the Cauldron immediately below the camera, and the Drygalski Ice Tongue in the far distance

- Location within Antarctica
- Location: Victoria Land
- Coordinates: 75°20′00″S 161°15′23″E
- Terminus: Ross Sea

The David Glacier (75°19′S 162°00′E) is a glacier over 600 nautical miles (1,100 km; 690 mi) long, flowing east from the polar plateau through the Prince Albert Mountains to the coast of Victoria Land, Antarctica. It enters Ross Sea between Cape Philippi and Cape Reynolds to form the floating Drygalski Ice Tongue. It is the most imposing outlet glacier in Victoria Land. It is fed by two main flows which drain an area larger than 200,000 square kilometres, with an estimated ice discharge rate of 7.8 ± 0.7 km^{3}/year. The David Glacier was discovered by Ernest Shackleton's "Northern Party," in November 1908, under the leadership of Prof. T.W. Edgeworth David, of Sydney University, for whom the feature was named.

== Location ==
The David Glacier flows eastward in a broad stream that gradually narrows towards the coast. The northern flow drains from Talos Dome to the Ross Sea, but the main branch of the stream is fed by a network of tributaries which drain a common area of the inner plateau around Dome C and converge in a spectacular icefall known as the David Cauldron. Mount Kring, Mount Wood and the Martin Nunataks are to the north of the David Glacier's head. The Ricker Hills and Trio Nunataks are to the south. The Hollingsworth Glacier joins the David Glacier from the southeast to the east of the Trio Nunataks. East of this the glacier descends through the David Cauldron, then continues east. It is joined from the north by the Woodberry Glacier, flowing between Evans Heights and Mount Fearon, and past Mount Priestley to the east. In its lower section the David Glacier flows past the D'Urville Wall, Mount Neumayer and Cape Philippi to the north, in the Prince Albert Mountains, and past Hughes Bluff and Cape Reynolds to the south, to form the Drygalski Ice Tongue, which enters the Ross Sea between Relief Inlet to the north and Geikie Inlet to the south.

== Features ==
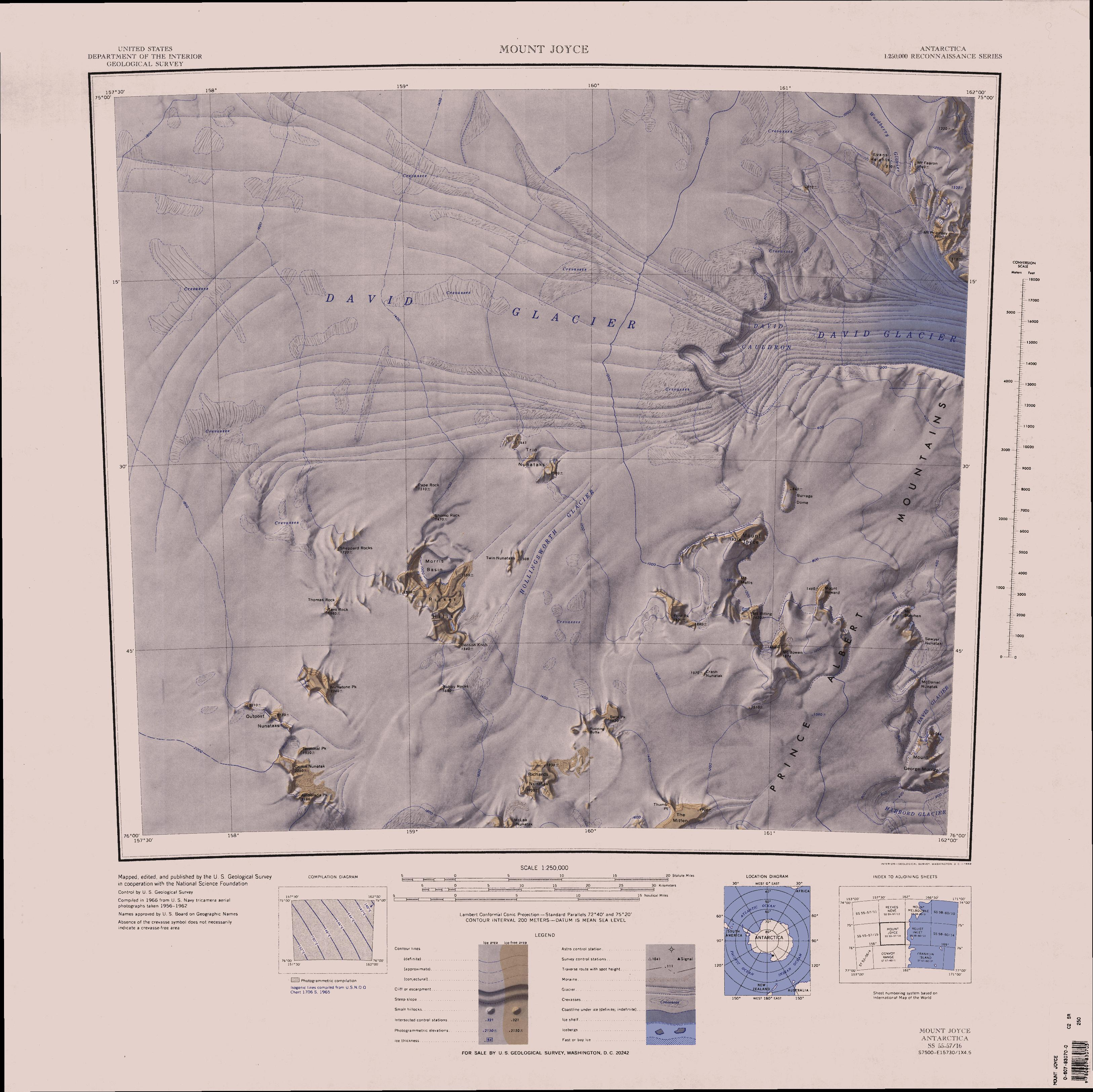
Upper section of the glacier

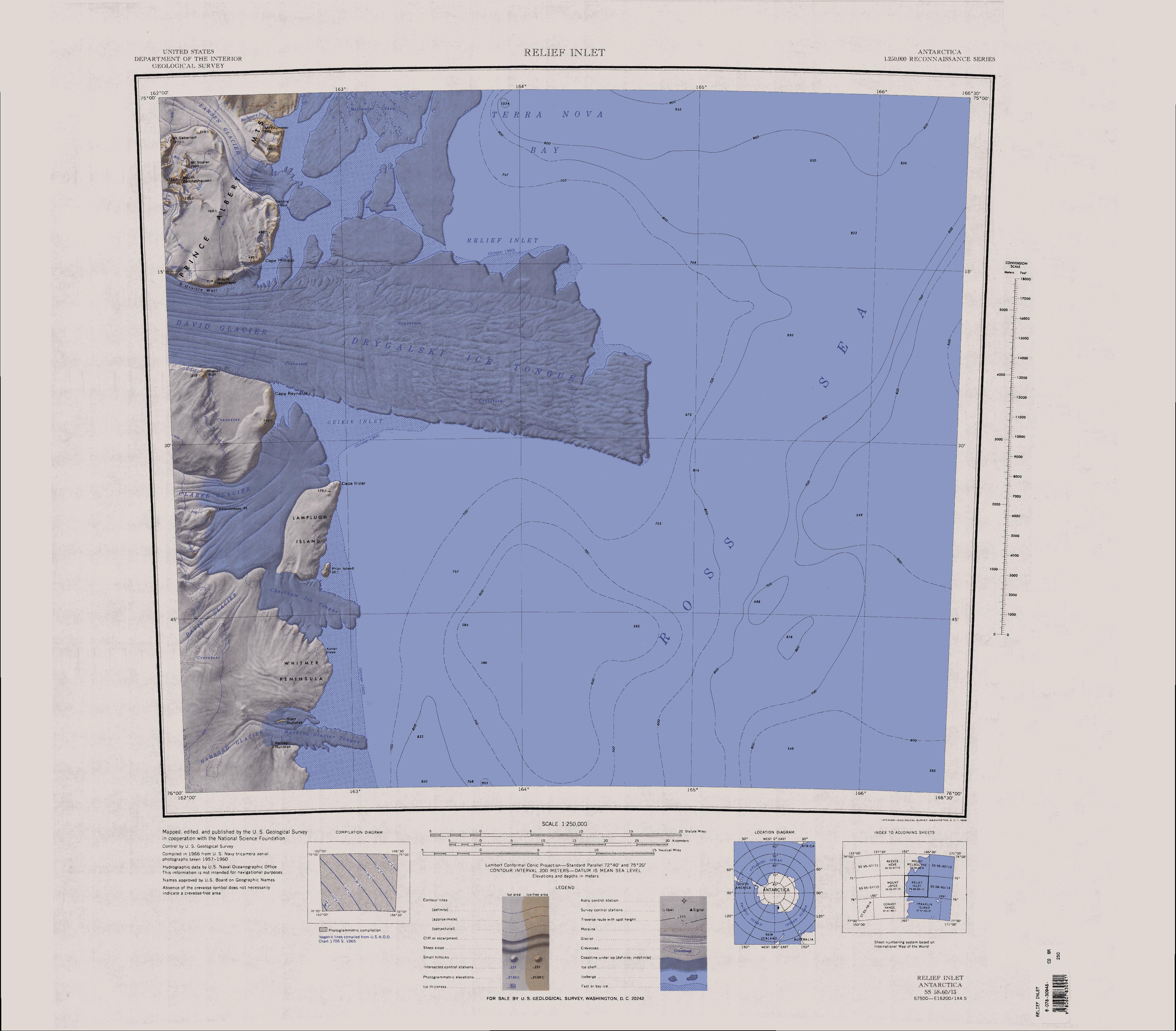
Terra Nova Bay in north center of map. Nansen Ice Shelf is darker blue area to the northeast

Features of the glacier, its tributaries and the terrain through which they flow include:

=== Mount Kring ===
74°59′S 157°54′E. A sharply defined nunatak on the northern margin of the upper reaches of David Glacier, 13 nautical miles (24 km; 15 mi) southwest of Mount Wood. Previously uncharted, it was used (with Mount Wood) as a reference for establishing a United States Antarctic Research Program (USARP) field party on Nov. 6, 1962. Named by D.B.McC. Rainey of the Cartographic Branch of the New Zealand Dept. of Lands and Survey for Staff Sergeant Arthur L. Kring, USMC, navigator on many United States Navy VX-6 Squadron flights during the 1962–63 season when New Zealand field parties received logistic support by that squadron.

=== Mount Wood ===
74°49′S 158°24′E. An isolated nunatak lying northward of David Glacier and 13 nautical miles (24 km; 15 mi) northeast of Mount Kring. Named by D.B. McC. Rainey of the Cartographic Branch of the New Zealand Dept. of Lands and Survey. Named after the foster parents of Staff Sgt. Arthur L. Kring, USMC, navigator with the United States Navy VX-6 Squadron which provided logistic support for the NZGSAE (1962–63).

=== Martin Nunataks ===
74°57′S 158°46′E. Two isolated nunataks situated along the northern margin of David Glacier, 9 nautical miles (17 km; 10 mi) southeast of Mount Wood. Mapped by the United States Geological Survey (USGS) from surveys and United States Navy air photos, 1956–62. Named by the United States Advisory Committee on Antarctic Names (US-ACAN) for Robert D. Martin, USGS topographic engineer at McMurdo Station, 1961–62.

=== Hollingsworth Glacier ===
75°33′S 159°57′E. A broad glacier of low gradient, draining the vicinity east of the Ricker Hills and flowing northeast to enter David Glacier just east of Trio Nunataks. Mapped by USGS from surveys and United States Navy air photos, 1956–62. Named by US-ACAN for Jerry L. Hollingsworth, meteorologist with the South Pole Station winter party, 1966.

=== David Cauldron ===
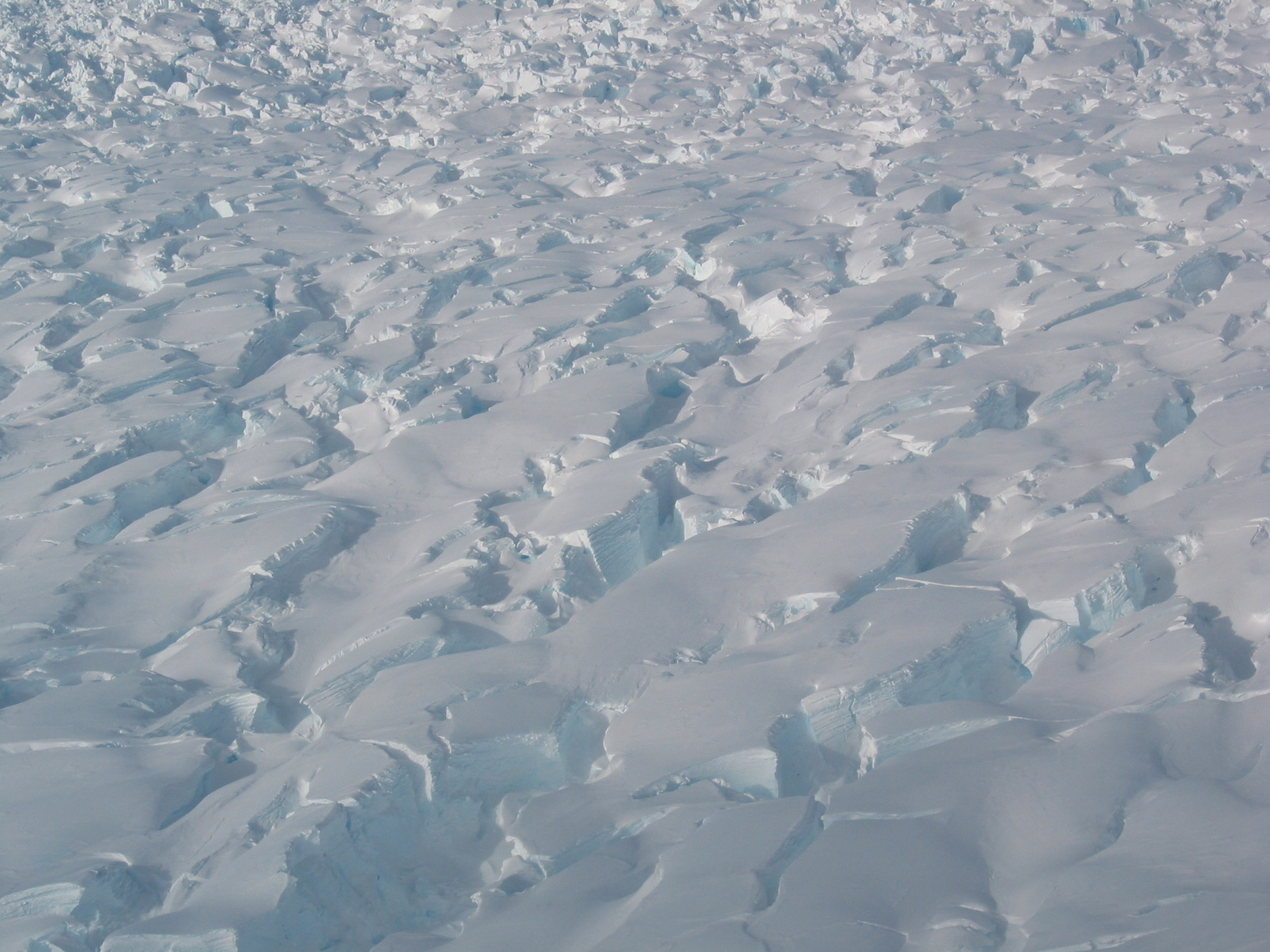
Crevasses 1 km seaward of David Cauldron

75°20′S 160°50′E. An icefall of turbulent iceblocks on the David Glacier. Named by the Southern Party of the NZGSAE, 1962–63, in association with David Glacier.

=== Woodberry Glacier ===
75°06′S 161°38′E. A small tributary glacier flowing south between Evans Heights and Mount Fearon to the north side of David Glacier. Mapped by USGS from surveys and United States Navy air photos, 1956–62. Named by US-ACAN for Barry D. Woodberry, ionospheric physicist with the South Pole Station winter party, 1966.

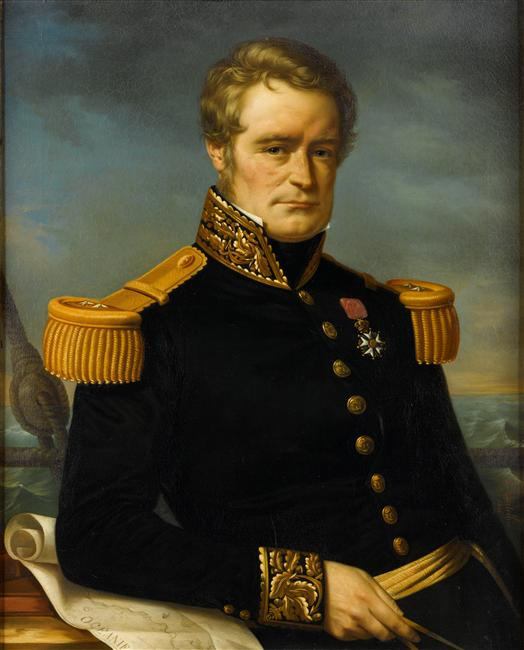
Jules Dumont d'Urville

=== D'Urville Wall ===
75°16′S 162°13′E. A great glacier-cut wall of granite which rises to 720 metres (2,360 ft) high and forms the north wall of David Glacier near its terminus. Discovered by the British Antarctic Expedition, 1907–09, under Shackleton. He named this feature for Admiral Jules Dumont d'Urville.

=== Cape Philippi ===
75°14′S 162°33′E. A rock cape rising abruptly to 490 metres (1,610 ft) high along the coast of Victoria Land, marking the north side of the terminus of David Glacier. Discovered by the British Antarctic Expedition, 1907–09, under Shackleton, who named this feature for Emil Philippi, distinguished geologist, who was a member of the GerAE, 1901–03, under Drygalski.

=== Hughes Bluff ===
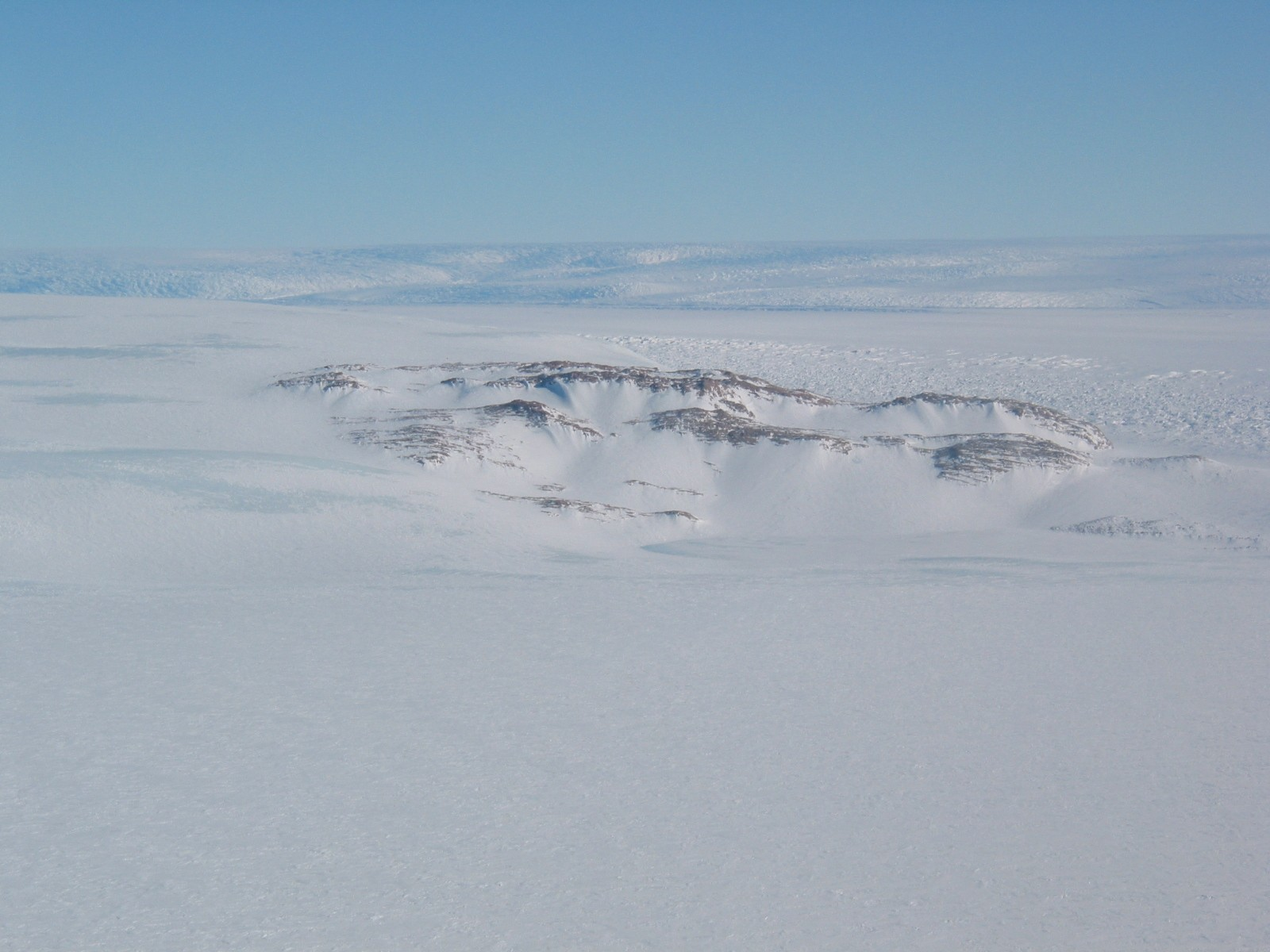
Hughes Bluff, as viewed from the south east. David Glacier is in the far distance, flowing from left to right on this photo

75°24′S 162°12′E. A conspicuous rock and ice bluff, 310 metres (1,020 ft) high, along the south side of David Glacier, 6 nautical miles (11 km; 6.9 mi) west of Cape Reynolds. Mapped by USGS from surveys and United States Navy tricamera aerial photography, 1957–62. Named by US-ACAN for Garrett A. Hughes, USARP researcher (cosmic radiation) at McMurdo Station in 1966.

=== Cape Reynolds ===
75°25′S 162°34′E. A rocky cape marking the south side of the terminus of David Glacier. Discovered by the British Antarctic Expedition, 1907–09, under Shackleton, who probably named this feature for Jeremiah (John) N. Reynolds, an American who long agitated for exploration of the Antarctic, and who was one of the principal promoters of the United States Exploring Expedition, 1838–42.

=== Geikie Inlet ===
75°30′S 163°00′E. An inlet along the coast of Victoria Land, formed between the cliffs of the Drygalski Ice Tongue on the north and Lamplugh Island and the seaward extension of Clarke Glacier on the south. Discovered by the British National Antarctic Expedition, 1901–04, under Scott, who named it after Sir Archibald Geikie, who gave much assistance in preparing the expedition.

== Sources ==
- Alberts, Fred G., ed. (1995), Geographic Names of the Antarctic (PDF) (2 ed.), United States Board on Geographic Names This article incorporates public domain material from websites or documents of the United States Board on Geographic Names.
- Frezzotti, M.; Capra, A.; Vittuari, L. (1998), "Comparison between glacier ice velocities inferred from GPS and sequential satellite images", Ann. Glaciol., 27: 54–60
- Frezzotti, M.; Tabacco, I.E.; Zirizzotti, A. (2000), "Ice discharge of eastern dome C drainage area, Antarctica, determined from airborne radar survey and satellite image, Analysis", J. Glaciol., 46: 253–264
- Mount Joyce, USGS: United States Geological Survey
- Reeves Névé, USGS: United States Geological Survey
- Relief Inlet, USGS: United States Geological Survey

This article incorporates public domain material from websites or documents of the United States Geological Survey.
