= Drygalski Basin =

Body of water in Victoria Land, Antarctica

- Location within Antarctica
- Location: Victoria Land, Antarctica
- Coordinates: 74°50′S 166°30′E

Drygalski Basin is an undersea basin named as such by the Advisory Committee for Undersea Features (ACUF) in April 1980, in association with Drygalski Ice Tongue. The name was changed to "Von Drygalski" in November 1995, in agreement with the General Bathymetric Chart of the Oceans Sub-Committee on Undersea Feature Names, but was changed back to Drygalski Basin by ACUF in June 2003.
