= Reeves Glacier =

Glacier in Antarctica

- Location within Antarctica
- Location: Victoria Land
- Coordinates: 74°45′S 162°15′E
- Terminus: Nansen Ice Sheet

The Reeves Glacier (74°45′S 162°15′E) is a broad glacier originating on the interior upland and descending between Eisenhower Range and Mount Larsen to merge with the Nansen Ice Sheet along the coast of Victoria Land, Antarctica.

== Discovery and naming ==
The Reeves Glacier was discovered and named by the British Antarctic Expedition, 1907–09, under Ernest Shackleton. The New Zealand Antarctic Place-Names Committee (NZ-APC) reported that the glacier is probably named for William Pember Reeves, former New Zealand Cabinet Minister, and the Agent-General for New Zealand in London, 1896–1909.

== Location ==
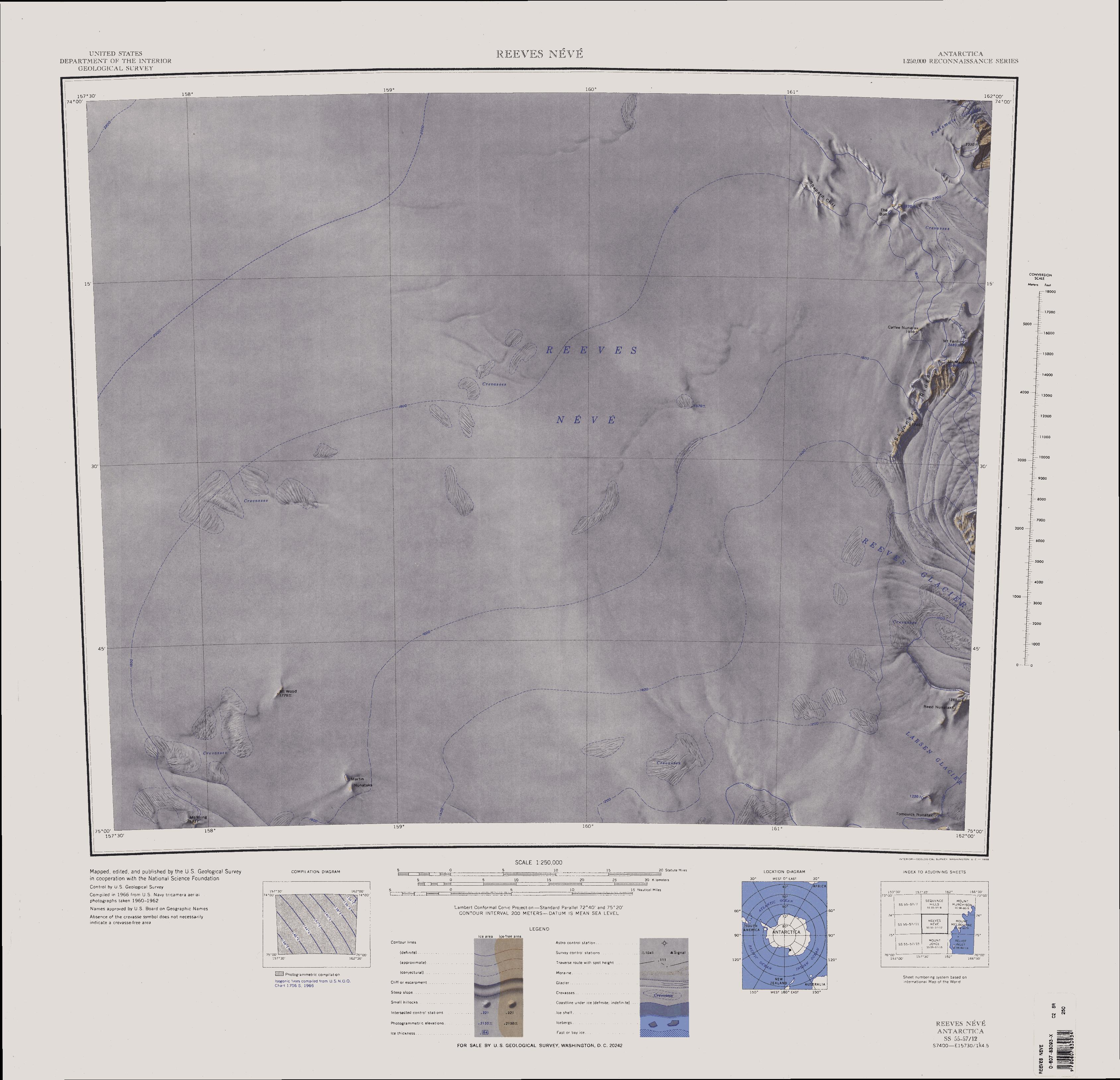
Upper part of glacier southeast of map

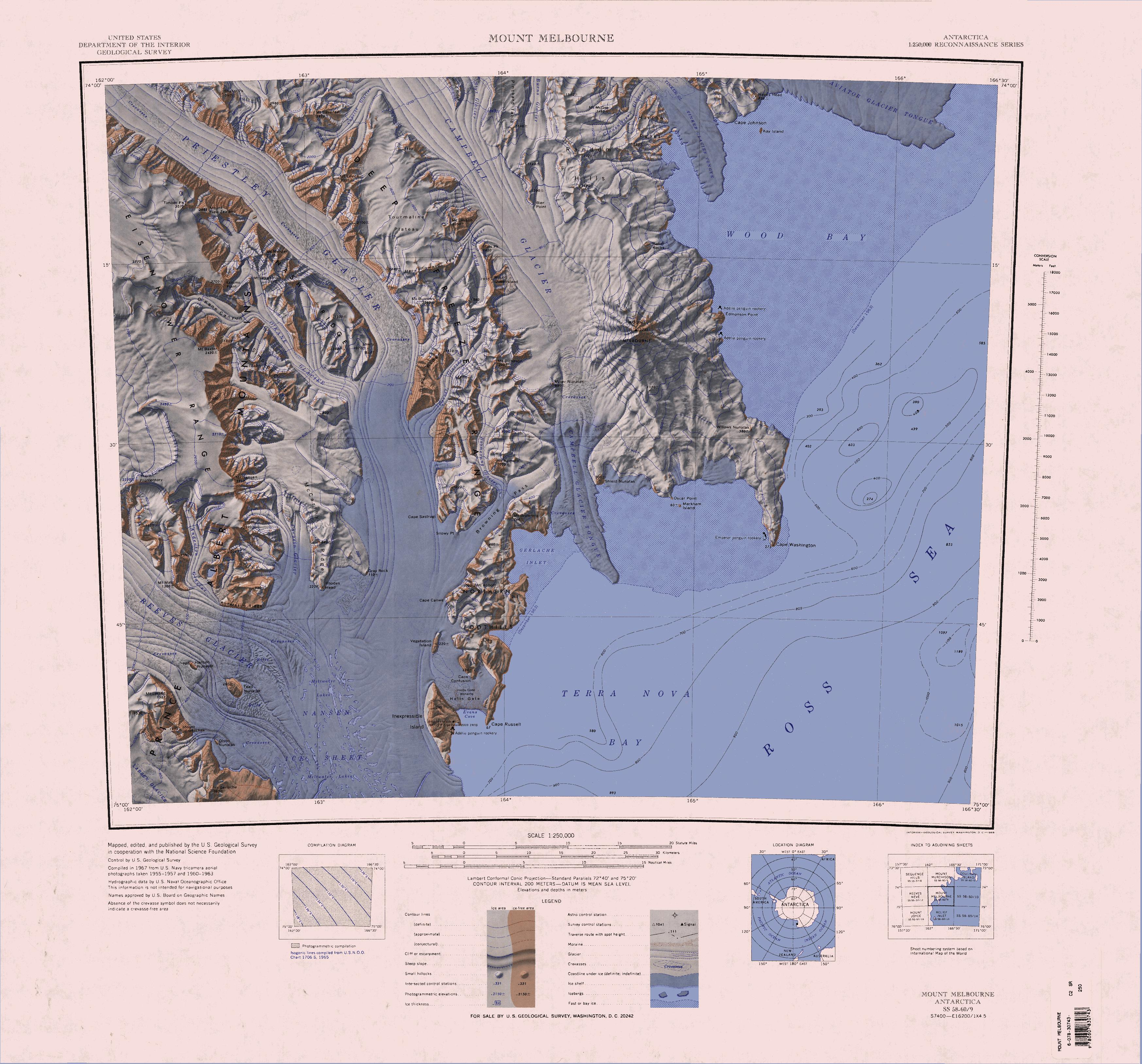
Lower part of glacier southwest of map

The Reeves Glacier originates in the Reeves Névé on the polar plateau. This large névé is surrounded by scattered isolated features, including the Shepard Cliff, The Boil, Calfee Nunatak and Mount Fenton. Ice flows from the north past Mount Mackintosh and the Skinner Ridge to join the head of the Reeves Glacier below the Reeves Névé. The glacier flows east-southeast through the Prince Albert Mountains to the Nansen Ice Sheet. To its south it passes Mount Larsen and Mount Janetschek, and flows past both sides of the Hansen Nunatak and Teall Nunatak. To its north it flows past the Thern Promontory and Mount Matz, past which it is joined by the Anderton Glacier, then past Andersson Ridge, where the Carnein Glacier joins it in the Nansen Ice Sheet.

== Upper features ==
=== Reeves Névé ===
74°25′S 160°00′E. An extensive névé lying westward of the Eisenhower Range. Reeves Glacier, which drains southeastward to the coast, has its source in this névé. Named by the NZ-APC in association with Reeves Glacier.

=== Shepard Cliff ===
74°08′S 161°09′E. An isolated cliff, 4 nautical miles (7.4 km; 4.6 mi) long, at the northeast margin of the Reeves Névé. Mapped by USGS from surveys and United States Navy aerial photographs, 1956-62. Named by US-ACAN for Danny L. Shepard, United States Navy, construction electrician at South Pole Station in 1966.

=== The Boil ===
74°09′S 161°32′E. A prominent snow eminence marked by rock exposures on the northeast side of the Reeves Névé. It rises over 2,300 metres (7,500 ft) high and stands 4 nautical miles (7.4 km; 4.6 mi) east of Shepard Cliff. The descriptive name was apparently applied by the Southern Party of the New Zealand Geological Survey Antarctic Expedition (NZGSAE) during a visit to the feature in December 1962.

=== Calfee Nunatak ===
74°19′S 161°40′E. An isolated nunatak at the east side of Reeves Névé, 4 nautical miles (7.4 km; 4.6 mi) west of Mount Fenton. Mapped by the United States Geological Survey (USGS) from surveys and United States Navy aerial photographs, 1956-62. Named by the United States Advisory Committee on Antarctic Names (US-ACAN) for David W. Calfee, field assistant at McMurdo Station, 1965-66.

=== Mount Fenton ===
74°20′S 161°55′E. A peak, 2,480 metres (8,140 ft) high, rising from the northern part of Skinner Ridge, 2 nautical miles (3.7 km; 2.3 mi) northeast of Mount Mackintosh. Mapped by USGS from surveys and United States Navy air photos, 1956-62. Named by US-ACAN for Michael D. Fenton, geologist at McMurdo Station, 1965-66.

=== Mount Mackintosh ===
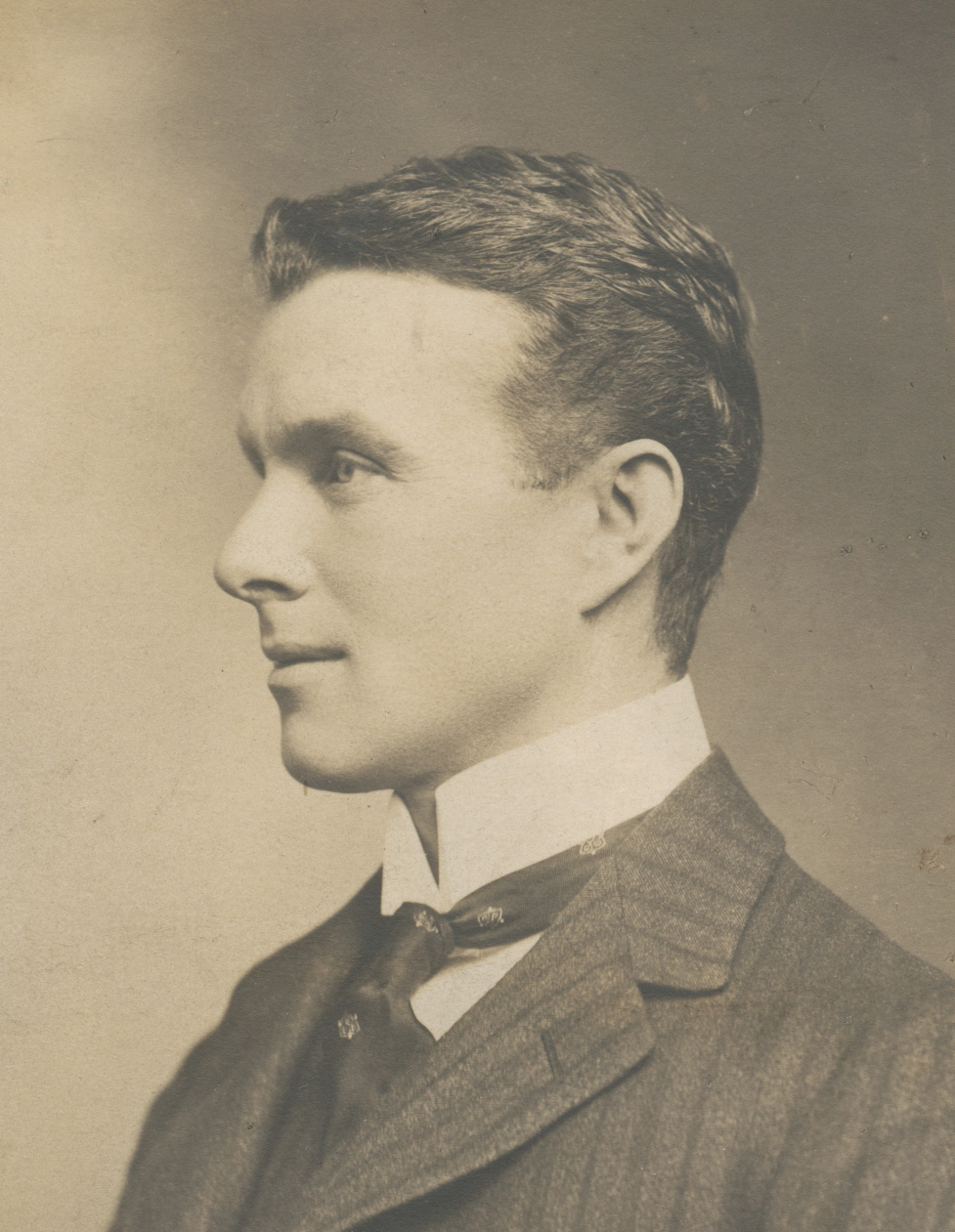
Aeneas Mackintosh

74°22′S 161°49′E. A peak, 2,300 metres (7,500 ft) high, that rises from Skinner Ridge, 2 nautical miles (3.7 km; 2.3 mi) southwest of Mount Fenton, on the western margin of the Eisenhower Range. Charted by the British Antarctic Expedition, 1907–09 under Ernest Shackleton, who named it for Aeneas Mackintosh, Second Officer on the expedition ship, the Nimrod.

=== Skinner Ridge ===
74°24′S 161°45′E. A ridge, 12 nautical miles (22 km; 14 mi) long, that descends southwest ward from the western side of Eisenhower Range. Mount Fenton and Mount Mackintosh are astride the northern part of this ridge. The feature was visited by the Southern Party of the NZGSAE (1962-63), who named it for D.N.B. Skinner, geologist with the expedition.

== Lower features ==
=== Mount Larsen ===
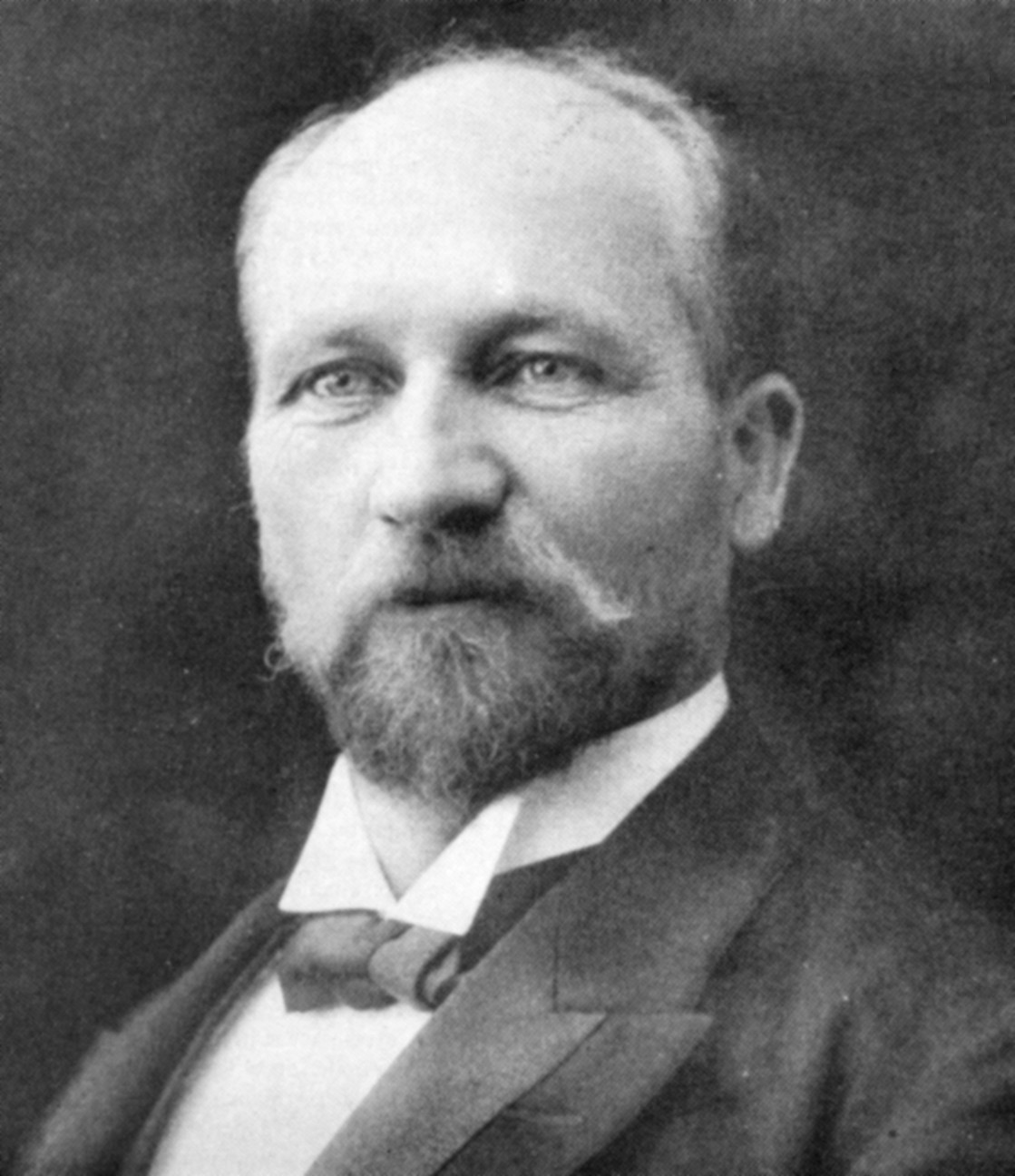
Carl Anton Larsen

74°51′S 162°12′E. A mountain, 1,560 metres (5,120 ft) high, presenting sheer granite cliffs on the north side standing 3 nautical miles (5.6 km; 3.5 mi) southwest of Hansen Nunatak at the south side of the mouth of Reeves Glacier. Discovered by the British National Antarctic Expedition (BrNAE) (1901-04) under Scott, who named it for Captain Carl Anton Larsen, noted Norwegian Antarctic explorer whose explorations along the east coast of Antarctic Peninsula in the Jason, 1892-93, marked the beginning of commercial whaling operations in the Antarctic. Larsen led numerous whaling expeditions until his death in December 1925 while directing operations in the Ross Sea.

=== Mount Janetschek ===
74°54′S 162°16′E. A mountain, 1,455 metres (4,774 ft) high, standing between Mount Larsen and Widowmaker Pass at the south side of the mouth of Reeves Glacier. Mapped by USGS from surveys and United States Navy air photos, 1955-63. Named by US-ACAN for Heinz Janetschek, biologist at McMurdo Station, 1961-62 season.

=== Hansen Nunatak ===
74°48′S 162°20′E. A prominent beehive-shaped nunatak, 965 metres (3,166 ft) high, near the terminus of Reeves Glacier, rising above the middle of the glacier about 3 nautical miles (5.6 km; 3.5 mi) northeast of Mount Larsen and 3 nautical miles (5.6 km; 3.5 mi) northwest of Teall Nunatak. Discovered by the BrNAE, 1901-04, the area was more fully explored by the British Antarctic Expedition, 1907-09, which named this feature.

=== Teall Nunatak ===
74°50′S 162°33′E. A large nunatak at the mouth of Reeves Glacier, standing 3 nautical miles (5.6 km; 3.5 mi) southeast of Hansen Nunatak. Discovered by the BrNAE, 1901-04. The area was more fully explored by the British Antarctic Expedition, 1907-09, which named this feature for Sir Jethro Justinian Harris Teall, Director of the Geological Survey and Museum of Practical Geology, London, 1901-13.

=== Thern Promontory ===
74°33′S 162°06′E. A high, ice-covered promontory, 2,220 metres (7,280 ft) high, forming a westward projection at the south end of Eisenhower Range, about 7 nautical miles (13 km; 8.1 mi) west of Mount Nansen, in Victoria Land. Named by US-ACAN for Michael G. Thern, station engineer at McMurdo Station with the 1965-66 summer party and the 1967 winter party.

=== Mount Matz ===
74°42′S 162°17′E. A mountain, 1,300 metres (4,300 ft) high, at the west side of the terminus of Anderton Glacier, forming the end of a ridge descending south from Elsenhower Range to Reeves Glacier. Mapped by USGS from surveys and United States Navy air photos, 1955-63. Named by US-ACAN for David B. Matz, geologist at McMurdo Station, 1965-66 season.

=== Anderton Glacier ===
74°41′S 162°22′E. A tributary glacier, 7 nautical miles (13 km; 8.1 mi) long, descending the south slopes of Eisenhower Range to enter Reeves Glacier between Mount Matz and Andersson Ridge. Mapped by USGS from surveys and United States Navy air photos, 1955-63. Named by US-ACAN for Peter W. Anderton, glaciologist at McMurdo Station, summer 1965-66.

=== Andersson Ridge ===
74°43′S 162°37′E. A ridge, 4 nautical miles (7.4 km; 4.6 mi) long, in southern Elsenhower Range, forming the north wall of Reeves Glacier between the mouths of Anderton Glacier and Carnein Glacier. Mapped by USGS from surveys and United States Navy air photos, 1955-63. Named by US-ACAN for Lars E. Andersson, cosmic radiation scientist, South Pole Station winter party of 1966.

== Sources ==
- Alberts, Fred G., ed. (1995), Geographic Names of the Antarctic (PDF) (2 ed.), United States Board on Geographic Names This article incorporates public domain material from websites or documents of the United States Board on Geographic Names.
- Mount Melbourne.jpg, USGS: United States Geological Survey
- Reeves Névé, USGS: United States Geological Survey

This article incorporates public domain material from websites or documents of the United States Geological Survey.
