= Ricker Hills =

Hills in Antarctica

- Location within Antarctica

Highest point
- Coordinates: 75°41′S 159°10′E

Geography
- Continent: Antarctica
- Region(s): Victoria Land, Antarctica
- Parent range: Prince Albert Mountains

The Ricker Hills (75°41′S 159°10′E) are a group of mainly ice-free hills, about 9 nautical miles (17 km; 10 mi) long, lying just west of Hollingsworth Glacier in Antarctica. They were mapped and named by the Southern Party of the New Zealand Geological Survey Antarctic Expedition (NZGSAE), 1962–63, for J.F. Ricker, a geologist with the party.

== Location ==
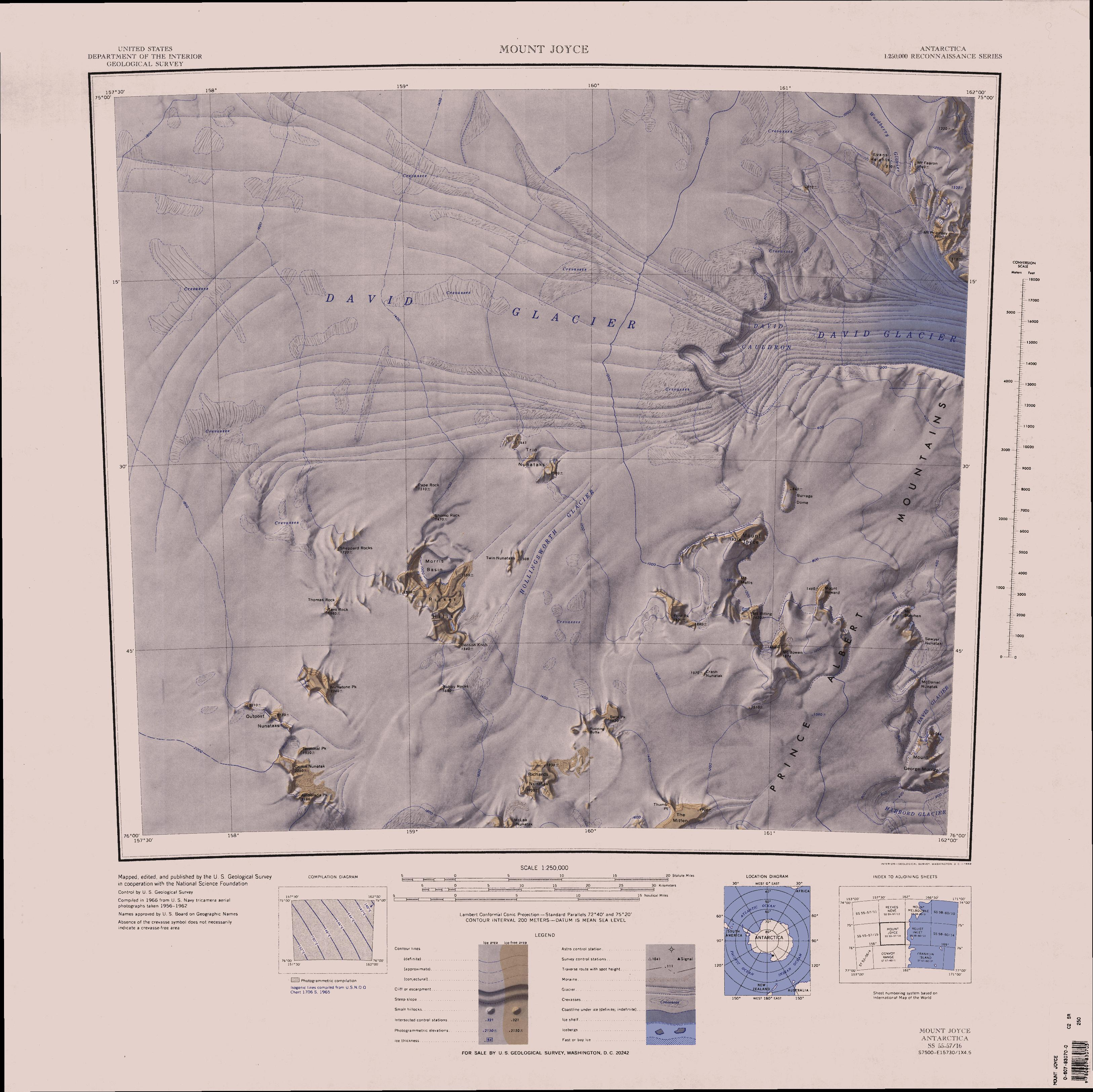
Ricker Hills towards the southwest of the map

The Ricker Hills are just west of the Hollingsworth Glacier, which flows along their east side, and south of the David Glacier. The Antarctic Plateau is to their west and south, with various scattered peaks or nunataks emerging from the ice.

== Features ==
Features of the Ricker Hills include the Morris Basin in the north and Benson Knob in the south.

=== Morris Basin ===
75°39′S 159°09′E. A basin of about 9 square nautical miles (31 km^{2}; 12 sq mi) in area in the north part of the Ricker Hills, in the Prince Albert Mountains, Victoria Land. The south portion of the basin is ice free but the north portion is occupied by a large lobe of ice. Mapped by USGS from surveys and United States Navy air photos, 1956-62. Named by US-ACAN for Robert W. Morris, biologist at McMurdo Station in the 1965-66 and 1966-67 seasons.

=== Benson Knob ===
75°45′S 159°17′E. A distinctive rock knob, 1,540 metres (5,050 ft) high, at the south extremity of Ricker Hills in the Prince Albert Mountains, Victoria Land. Mapped by USGS from surveys and United States Navy air photos, 1956-62. Named by US-ACAN for Anthony J. Benson, hospital corpsman with the South Pole Station winter party, 1966.

== Northern features ==
Features to the north include the Twin Nunataks, Trio Nunataks, Shomo Rock and Pape Rock.

=== Twin Nunataks ===
75°38′S 159°36′E. Two small nunataks lying between Ricker Hills and Hollingsworth Glacier in the Prince Albert Mountains, Victoria Land. Descriptively named by the Southern Party of the NZGSAE, 1962-63.

=== Trio Nunataks ===
75°30′S 159°42′E. Three large nunataks standing at the south side of David Glacier, just west of the terminus of Hollingsworth Glacier, in Victoria Land. Named by the Southern Party of the NZGSAE, 1962-63.

=== Shomo Rock ===
75°35′S 159°09′E. A nunatak lying between the Ricker Hills and Pape Rock in the Prince Albert Mountains, Victoria Land. Mapped by USGS from surveys and United States Navy air photos 1956-62. Named by US-ACAN for Barry C. Shomo, equipment operator with the South Pole Station winter party of 1966.

=== Pape Rock ===
75°32′S 159°04′E. A lone rock at the south side of David Glacier, 3 nautical miles (5.6 km; 3.5 mi) northwest of Shomo Rock, in the Prince Albert Mountains. Mapped by USGS from surveys and United States Navy air photos, 1956-62. Named by US-ACAN for Bernard C. Pape, builder with the South Pole Station winter party, 1966.

== Western features ==
Features to the west and southwest include the Sheppard Rocks, Thomas Rock, Tent Rock, Brimstone Peak, Outpost Nunataks, Terminal Peak, Griffin Nunatak and Ambalada Peak.

=== Sheppard Rocks ===
75°37′S 158°38′E. A group of rocks lying 4 nautical miles (7.4 km; 4.6 mi) northwest of Ricker Hills, in the Prince Albert Mountains. Mapped by USGS from surveys and United States Navy air photos, 1956-62. Named by US-ACAN for Paul D. Sheppard, storekeeper with the South Pole Station winter party in 1966.

=== Thomas Rock ===
75°42′S 158°36′E. A small nunatak lying 1 nautical mile (1.9 km; 1.2 mi) northeast of Tent Rock and 6 nautical miles (11 km; 6.9 mi) west of Ricker Hills in the Prince Albert Mountains. Mapped by USGS from surveys and United States Navy air photos 1956-62. Named by US-ACAN for Kenneth E. Thomas, radioman with the winter party at South Pole Station, 1966.

=== Tent Rock ===
75°42′S 158°34′E. A small nunatak shaped like a ridge tent, lying 1 nautical mile (1.9 km; 1.2 mi) southwest of Thomas Rock and 7 nautical miles (13 km; 8.1 mi) west of Ricker Hills in the Prince Albert Mountains. Mapped and descriptively named by the Southern Party of NZGSAE, 1962-63.

=== Brimstone Peak ===
75°48′S 158°33′E. A peak, 2,340 metres (7,680 ft) high, surmounting a small ice-free mesa between Outpost Nunataks and Ricker Hills, in the Prince Albert Mountains. Mapped by the Southern Party of NZGSAE, 1962-63, which so named it because of coloring which suggested "hellfire and brimstone."

=== Outpost Nunataks ===
75°50′S 158°12′E. Three aligned nunataks standing 4 nautical miles (7.4 km; 4.6 mi) southwest of Brimstone Peak in the Prince Albert Mountains. Mapped by the Southern Party of the NZGSAE, 1962-63, and presumably named by the party because of the position of the nunataks near the edge of the polar plateau.

=== Terminal Peak ===
75°53′S 158°24′E. A small peak, 1,920 metres (6,300 ft) high, standing 1 nautical mile (1.9 km; 1.2 mi) north of Griffin Nunatak in the Prince Albert Mountains. So named by the Southern Party of NZGSAE, 1962-63, because it marked the western extent of their journey.

=== Griffin Nunatak ===
75°55′S 158°20′E. A flat-topped nunatak about 2 nautical miles (3.7 km; 2.3 mi) long, standing between Ambalada Peak and Terminal Peak in the Prince Albert Mountains. Mapped by USGS from surveys and United States Navy air photos, 1956-62. Named by US-ACAN for Lieutenant William R. Griffin, (MC) United States Navy, officer in charge at South Pole Station, winter party 1966.

=== Ambalada Peak ===
75°57′S 158°23′E. A rock peak, 2,160 metres (7,090 ft) high, standing 2 nautical miles (3.7 km; 2.3 mi) southeast of Griffin Nunatak in the Prince Albert Mountains. Mapped by USGS from surveys and United States Navy air photos, 1956-62. Named by US-ACAN for Cesar N. Ambalada, electrician with the South Pole Station winter party, 1966.

== Southern features ==
Features to the south include Bobby Rocks, McLea Nunatak and Richards Nunatak.

=== Bobby Rocks ===
75°49′S 159°11′E. Ice-free rocks lying 4 nautical miles (7.4 km; 4.6 mi) south of Ricker Hills in the Prince Albert Mountains. Mapped by USGS from surveys and United States Navy air photos, 1956-62. Named by US-ACAN for Bobby J. Davis, commissaryman with the South Pole Station winter party, 1966.

=== Beta Peak ===
75°51′S 160°06′E. A rock peak, 1,620 metres (5,310 ft) high, surmounting a small ice-free mesa 2 nautical miles (3.7 km; 2.3 mi) northeast of Pudding Butte. So named by the Southern Party of NZGSAE, 1962-63, because they always referred to this feature throughout the season as Station B.

=== Pudding Butte ===
75°52′S 159°59′E. A butte standing 2 nautical miles (3.7 km; 2.3 mi) southwest of Beta Peak, in the Prince Albert Mountains. Named by the Southern Party of the NZGSAE, 1962-63, because of a splendid feast at the nearby camp.

=== Richards Nunatak ===
75°56′S 159°45′E. A large nunatak between McLea Nunatak and Pudding Butte in the Prince Albert Mountains. Mapped and named by the Southern Party of NZGSAE, 1962-63, for David Richards, radio operator at Scott Base, who shared field party work and was responsible for the training of the base dog team in the absence of the base dog handler.

=== McLea Nunatak ===
75°59′S 159°30′E. A nunatak between Richards Nunatak and Sharks Tooth, in the Prince Albert Mountains. Named by the Southern Party of the NZGSAE, 1962-63, for F. McLea, radio operator at Scott Base who was responsible for the field party radio communications.

=== Sharks Tooth ===
76°02′S 159°38′E. A small steep-sided, tooth-like rock lying west of Beckett Nunatak at the north side of the upper Mawson Glacier. Mapped and named by the Southern Party of the NZGSAE, 1962-63.

== Sources ==
- Alberts, Fred G., ed. (1995), Geographic Names of the Antarctic (PDF) (2 ed.), United States Board on Geographic Names This article incorporates public domain material from websites or documents of the United States Board on Geographic Names.
- Mount Joyce, USGS: United States Geographic Board

This article incorporates public domain material from websites or documents of the United States Geological Survey.
