= Vacchi Piedmont Glacier =

Glacier in Antarctica

Vacchi Piedmont Glacier (74°34′00″S 164°38′00″E) is a piedmont glacier between Shield Nunatak and Oscar Point on the Scott Coast, in Victoria Land. The glacier terminates at Silverfish Bay. It was named by the New Zealand Geographic Board in 2006 after Marino Vacchi, a marine researcher and participant in the Italian Antarctic Program from 1987; from 1990, the Italian delegate to the working meetings of the Commission for the Conservation of Antarctic Marine Living Resources.
