= Hells Gate Moraine =

Glacial moraine in Antarctica

Coordinates: 74°52′S 163°48′E

Hells Gate Moraine is a glacial moraine at the head of Evans Cove on the coast of Victoria Land, Antarctica. It extends southward to Hells Gate from nearby Vegetation Island and Cape Confusion.

== History ==
The moraine was mapped and named by the Northern Party of the British Terra Nova Expedition (1910–13), in association with Hells Gate.

=== Historic site ===
On 25 January 1913 The Terra Nova expedition established an emergency depot at the moraine consisting of a sled loaded with supplies and equipment. Although the sled and its contents were removed in 1994 in order to stabilise their deteriorating condition, the site has been designated a Historic Site or Monument (HSM 68), following a proposal by New Zealand, Norway and the United Kingdom to the Antarctic Treaty Consultative Meeting.
