= Silverfish Bay =

Body of water in Victoria Land, Antarctica

Silverfish Bay (74°37′00″S 164°38′00″E) is a roughly triangular body of water that lies within Terra Nova Bay along the Scott Coast of Victoria Land. Its outline may be defined by a line that connects the tip of the Campbell Glacier Tongue, Shield Nunatak, Oscar Point, and then returns to the Campbell Glacier Tongue. It was named by the New Zealand Geographic Board in 2006 because of an abundance of Antarctic silverfish (Pleuragramma antarcticum) eggs in the bay.
