= Deep Freeze Range =

Mountain range in Antarctica

Deep Freeze Range in Antarctica

The Deep Freeze Range (74°15′S 163°45′E) is a rugged mountain range, over 80 nautical miles (150 km; 92 mi) long and about 10 nautical miles (19 km; 12 mi) wide, rising between Priestley and Campbell Glaciers in Victoria Land, Antarctica, and extending from the edge of the polar plateau to Terra Nova Bay. It is southwest of the Southern Cross Mountains, south of the Mesa Range and northeast of the Eisenhower Range of the Prince Albert Mountains.

== Exploration and name ==
Peaks in the low and mid portions of the range were observed by early British expeditions to the Ross Sea. The range was mapped in detail by the United States Geological Survey (USGS) from surveys and U.S. Navy air photos, 1955-63. It was named by the United States Advisory Committee on Antarctic Names (US-ACAN) in recognition of the support to research provided by the U.S. Navy's Operation Deep Freeze expeditions to Antarctica for many years beginning in 1954.

== Location ==
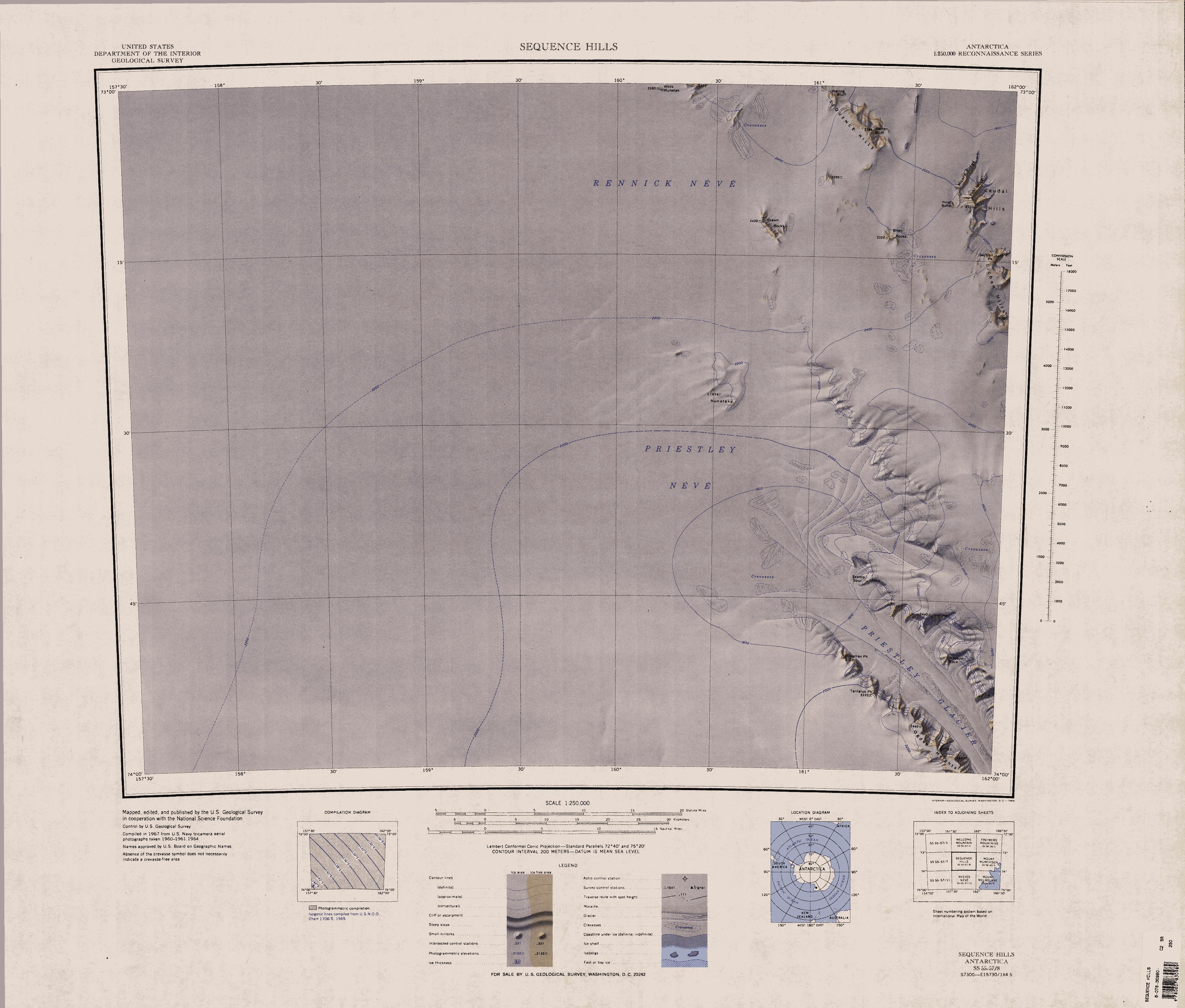
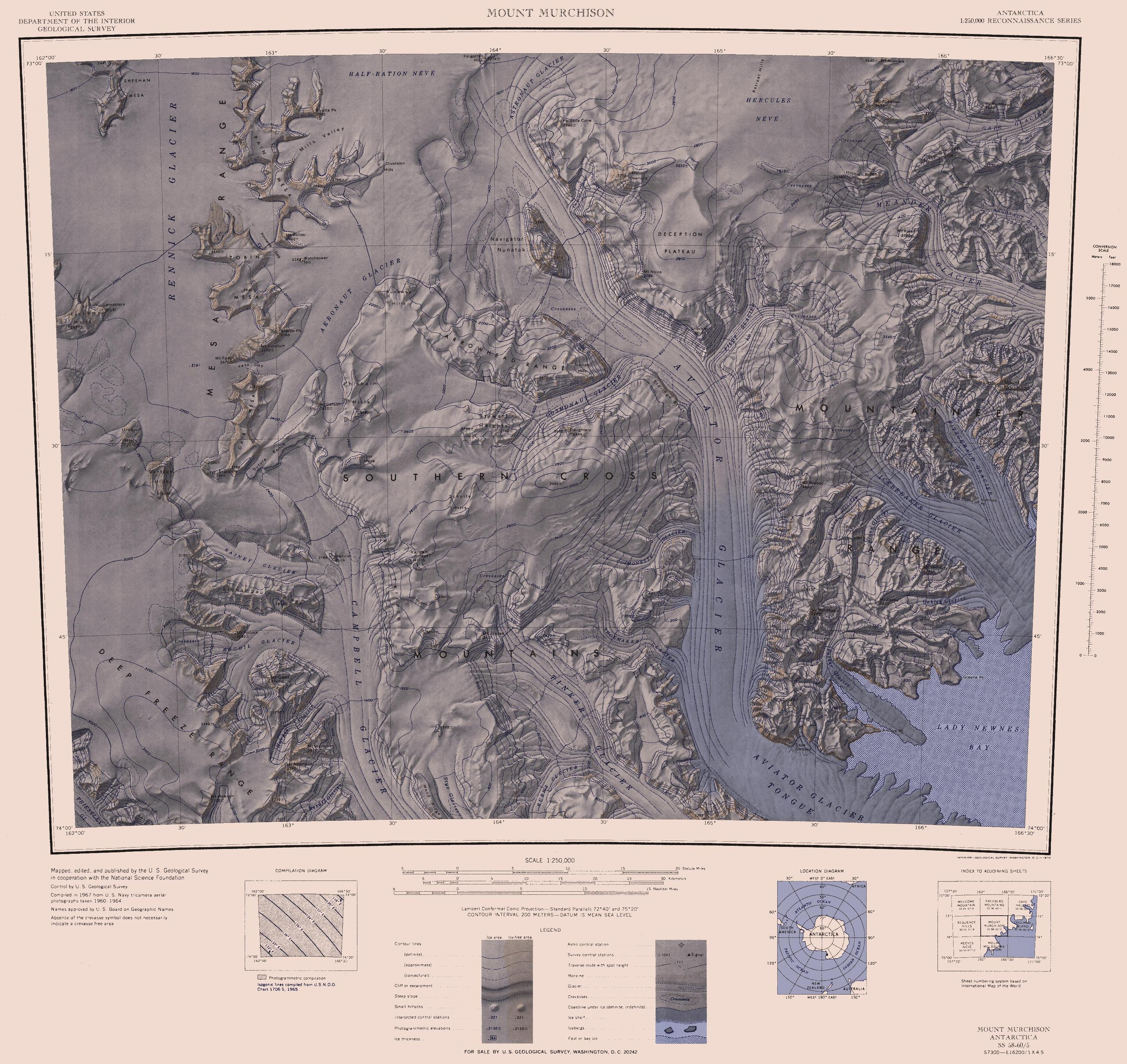

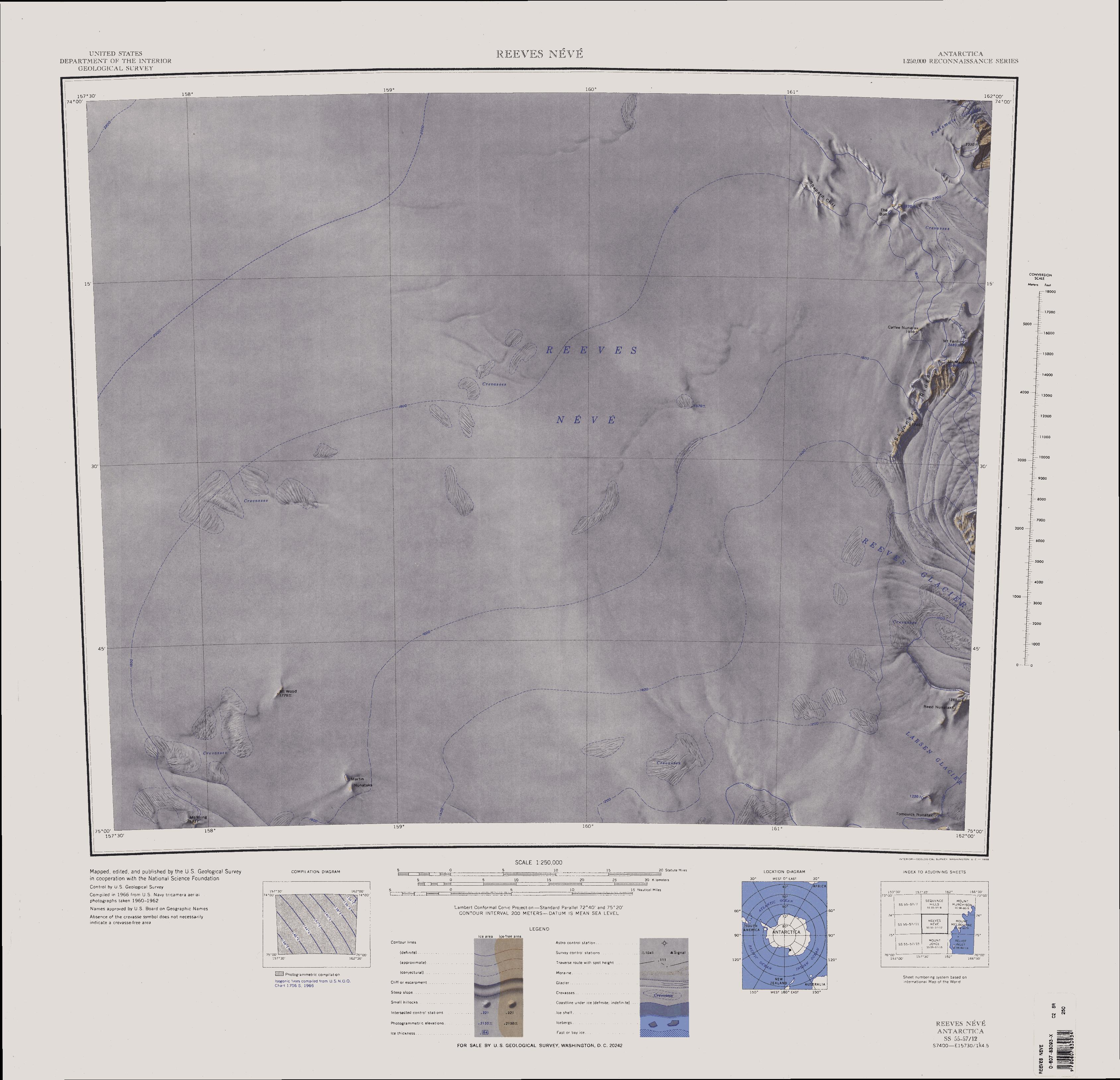
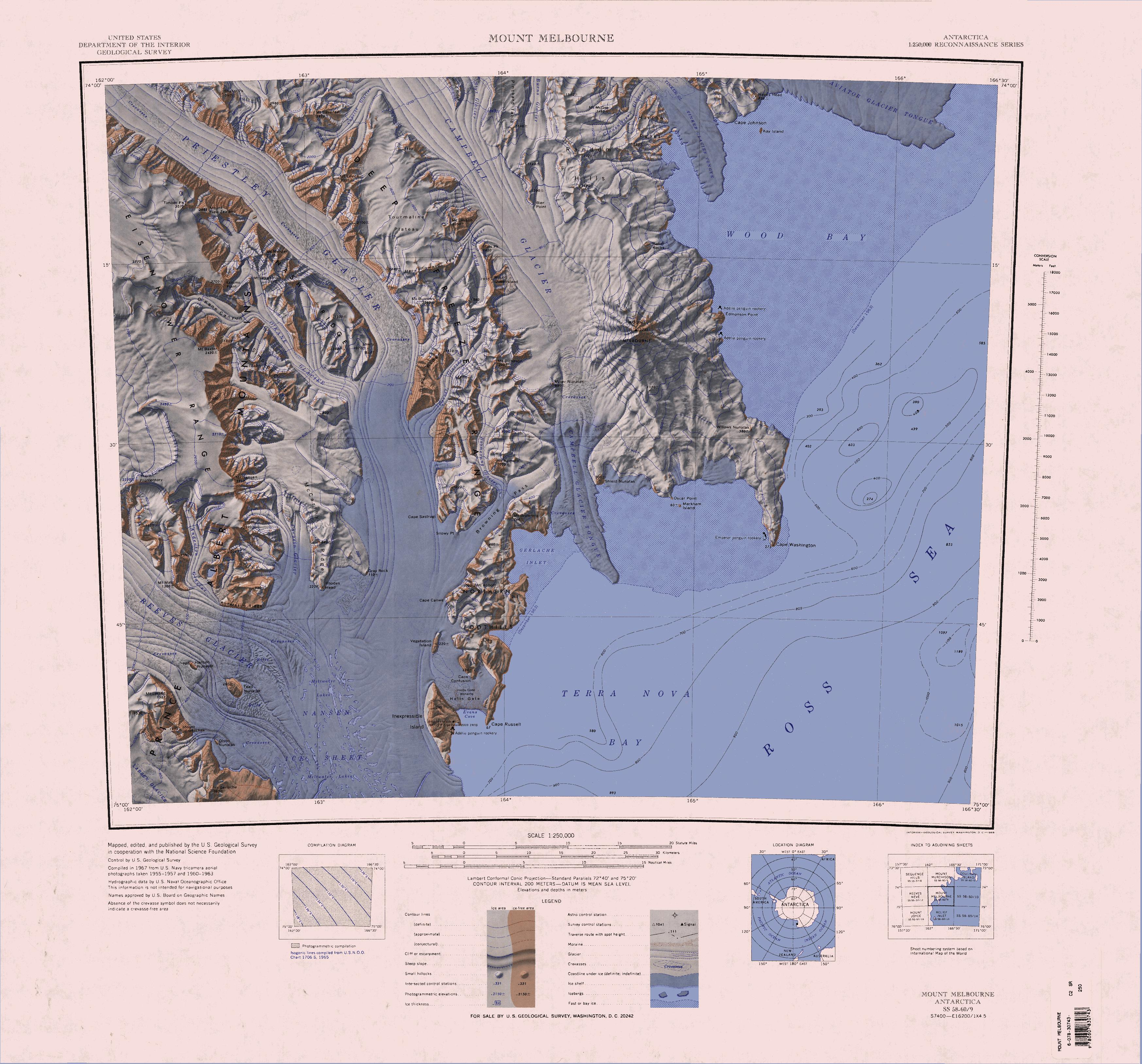
Deep Freeze Range extends from southeast to northwest, between Priestley Glacier and Campbell Glacier

The Deep Freeze Range extends from southeast to northwest, between Priestley Glacier and Campbell Glacier. The narrow northwest end of the range ends in Szanto Spur, and includes Wasson Rock. The Reeves Névé lies to the west. The range extends north to Archambault Ridge, south of Rainey Glacier. To the south of this along the west of Campbell Glacier are Mount Pollock, Recoil Glacier, Mount Gibbs, Harper Glacier, Mount Mankinen, Mount Adamson and Rebuff Glacier. Further south are Shafer Peak, Mount Cavaney, Capsize Glacier, Mount Levick, the Tourmaline Plateau, Mount Emison, the Howard Peaks, Bates Glacier, Mills Peak, Mount Queensland, Mount Burrows, the Corner Glacier, Mount Dickason, Miller Nunatak, Boomerang Glacier, Mount Keinath and Browning Pass. The Northern Foothills are south of Browning Pass.

== Features ==
Features, from north to south, include:

=== Mount Pollock ===
73°45′S 162°47′E. A symmetrical mountain, 2,640 metres (8,660 ft) high, that rises above the midportion of Recoil Glacier just south of Archambault Ridge, in the Deep Freeze Range. Mapped by USGS from surveys and US. Navy air photos, 1960-64. Named by US-ACAN for Herbert W. Pollock, United States Navy, construction electrician at McMurdo Station, 1962 and 1967.

=== Mount Gibbs ===
73°49′S 162°56′E. A mountain 3,140 metres (10,300 ft) high rising on the south side of Recoil Glacier in the Deep Freeze Range. Mapped by USGS from surveys and United States Navy air photos, 1960-64. Named by US-ACAN for Lieutenant Maurice E. Gibbs, United States Navy, meteorological officer at McMurdo Station, 1967.

=== Mount Mankinen ===
73°54′S 163°06′E. A mountain 2,910 metres (9,550 ft) high situated 2 nautical miles (3.7 km; 2.3 mi) northeast of Mount Adamson in the Deep Freeze Range. Mapped by USGS from surveys and United States Navy air photos, 1960-64. Named by US-ACAN for Edward A. Mankinen, geologist at McMurdo Station, 1965-66.

=== Mount Adamson ===
73°55′S 163°0′E. A peak, 3,400 metres (11,200 ft) high, rising 6.5 nautical miles (12.0 km; 7.5 mi) |east-northeast of Mount Hewson. It was named by the northern party of New Zealand Geological Survey Antarctic Expedition (NZGSAE), 1965–66, for R. Adamson, a geologist with this party.

=== Mount Hewson ===
73°58′S 162°38′E. A bluff-type mountain, 3,720 metres (12,200 ft) high, standing 6.5 nautical miles (12.0 km; 7.5 mi) west-southwest of Mount Adamson. It was named by the southern party of NZGSAE, 1962–63, for R.W. Hewson, leader and surveyor of this party; also a surveyor for the northern party of NZGSAE, 1961-62.

=== Shafer Peak ===
74°01′S 162°36′E. A prominent peak, 3,600 metres (11,800 ft) high, standing 3 nautical miles (5.6 km; 3.5 mi) south of Mount Hewson. It was mapped by the USGS from surveys and United States Navy air photos, 1955-63. It was named by US-ACAN for Lieutenant Cdt. Willard G. Shafer, (CEC) United States Navy, officer in charge of the nuclear power plant at McMurdo Station, winter party 1965.

=== Mount Cavaney ===
74°03′S 163°03′E. A peak, 2,820 metres (9,250 ft) high, rising just north of the head of Capsize Glacier in Deep Freeze Range. Named by the Northern Party of the NZGSAE, 1965-66, for R.J. Cavaney, geologist with that party.

=== Mount Levick ===
74°08′S 163°10′E. A prominent mountain, 2,390 metres (7,840 ft) high, standing at the northwest side of Tourmaline Plateau in the Deep Freeze Range. First charted by the Northern Party of the British Antarctic Expedition, 1910–13 (BrAE), and named for G. Murray Levick, surgeon with the expedition and a member of the Northern Party.

=== Bloch Peak ===
74°12′S 163°15′E. A prominent peak in the Deep Freeze Range, between Priestley Glacier and the west part of Tourmaline Plateau. Named by US-ACAN in 1990 after Erich Bloch, Director, National Science Foundation, 1984-90. The Foundation, through its Office of Polar Programs, is responsible for the development of the United States Antarctic Program.

=== Tourmaline Plateau ===
74°10′S 163°27′E. An ice-covered plateau in the central part of the Deep Freeze Range, bounded by the Howard Peaks and the peaks and ridges which trend N-S from Mount Levick, in Victoria Land. So named by the Northern Party of NZGSAE, 1965-66, because of the quantities of tourmaline-granite found there.

=== Mount Emison ===
74°12′S 163°44′E. A prominent mountain, 2,050 metres (6,730 ft) high, rising on the west side of Campbell Glacier, just north of the mouth of Bates Glacier, in the Deep Freeze Range. Mapped by USGS from surveys and United States Navy air photos, 1955-63. Named by US-ACAN after William B. Emison, biologist at McMurdo Station, 1964-65 and 1965-66 seasons.

=== Howard Peaks ===
74°15′S 163°42′E. A line of east–west trending peaks at the south side of Tourmaline Plateau, extending transversely across Deep Freeze Range, in Victoria Land. Mapped by USGS from surveys and United States Navy air photos, 1955-63. Named by US-ACAN for Hugh C. Howard, cook at McMurdo Station for four summer seasons, 1963-64 to 1966-67.

=== Mills Peak ===
74°14′S 163°54′E. A sharp peak in the Deep Freeze Range, 1,420 metres (4,660 ft) high, standing along the west side of Campbell Glacier between Mount Queensland and the terminus of Bates Glacier. Mapped by USGS from surveys and United States Navy air photos, 1955-63. Named by US-ACAN for Peter J. Mills, geologist at McMurdo Station, 1965-66 season.

=== Mount Queensland ===
74°16′S 163°56′E. A prominent mountain, 1,910 metres (6,270 ft) high, standing 7 nautical miles (13 km; 8.1 mi) north of Mount Dickason. It was discovered by the British National Antarctic Expedition, 1901–04, which named this mountain for the state of Queensland, Australia, in recognition of the assistance given the expedition by its government.

=== Mount Burrows ===
74°18′S 163°39′E. A peak 2,260 metres (7,410 ft) high located 5 nautical miles (9.3 km; 5.8 mi) west-southwest of Mount Queensland in the Deep Freeze Range. The feature towers high above the lower, east side of Priestley Glacier. Named by the NZ-APC for A.L. Burrows, Scientific Leader at Scott Base, 1964-65.

=== Black Ridge ===
74°24′S 163°36′E. A prominent rock ridge in the Deep Freeze Range, Victoria Land, 7 nautical miles (13 km; 8.1 mi) long and rising to 1,500 metres (4,900 ft) high, forming a divide between the Priestley and Corner Glaciers. First explored by the Northern Party of the BrAE, 1910-13, and so named by them because of its appearance.

=== Mount Dickason ===
74°24′S 163°58′E. A prominent mountain, 2,030 metres (6,660 ft) high, at the head of Boomerang Glacier. It was first mapped by the Northern Party of the British Antarctic Expedition, 1910–13, and named for Harry Dickason, Royal Navy, a member of the Northern Party.

=== Mount Keinath ===
74°32′S 163°57′E. A mountain, 1,090 metres (3,580 ft) high, rising at the east side of the terminus of Boomerang Glacier in Deep Freeze Range. Mapped by USGS from surveys and United States Navy air photos, 1955-63. Named by US-ACAN for Gerald E. Keinath, biolab administrator at McMurdo Station, 1965-66 season.

=== Cape Sastrugi ===
74°37′S 163°41′E. A sharply projecting point on the west side of Deep Freeze Range, standing 1.5 nautical miles (2.8 km; 1.7 mi) northwest of Snowy Point and overlooking the north portion of Nansen Ice Sheet, in Victoria Land. First explored by the Northern Party of the BrAE, 1910-13, and so named by them because of large and extensive sastrugi that impeded the travel of this party in approaching the point.

=== Snowy Point ===
74°37′S 163°45′E. A gently sloping point marking the north side of the western portal of Browning Pass in Deep Freeze Range. First explored and given this descriptive name by the Northern Party of the BrAE, 1910-13.

== Sources ==
- Alberts, Fred G., ed. (1995), Geographic Names of the Antarctic (PDF) (2 ed.), United States Board on Geographic Names This article incorporates public domain material from websites or documents of the United States Board on Geographic Names.
- Mount Melbourne, USGS: United States Geographic Board
- Mount Murchison, USGS: United States Geographic Board
- Reeves Névé, USGS: United States Geographic Board
- Sequence Hills, USGS: United States Geographic Board

This article incorporates public domain material from websites or documents of the United States Geological Survey.
