= Adélie Cove =

Important Bird Area in Antarctica

Coordinates: 74°45′51″S 164°00′34″E

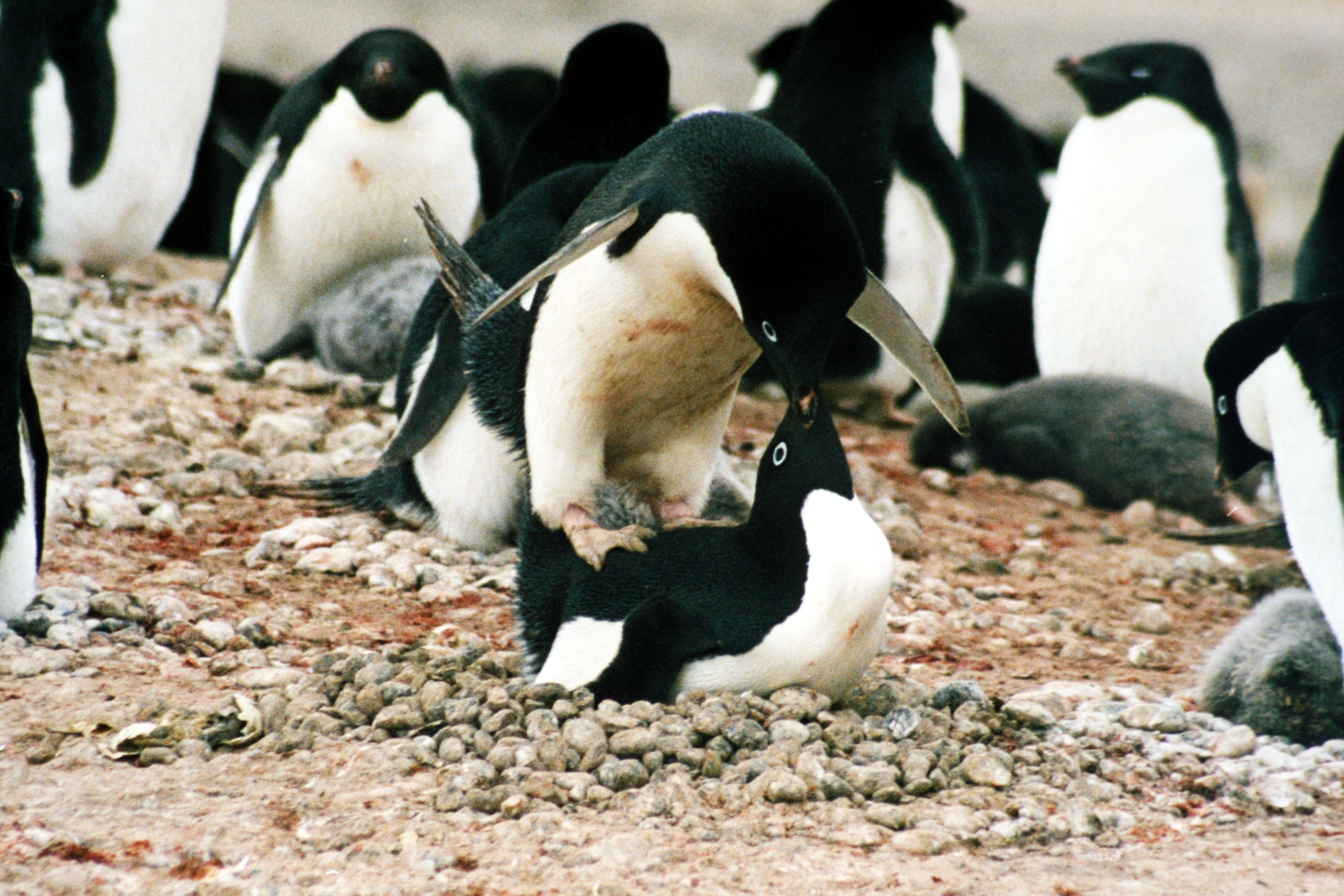
Adélie penguins mating

Adélie Cove is a 186-ha tract of ice-free land on the coast of Terra Nova Bay in Victoria Land, Antarctica. It has been identified as an Important Bird Area by BirdLife International because it supports populations of seabirds, notably a breeding colony of about 11,000 pairs of Adélie penguins. Some 30 pairs of south polar skuas breed near the penguin colony. The nearest permanent research stations are Italy's Mario Zucchelli 9 km to the north, and South Korea's Jang Bogo 17 km to the north.
