= Nansen Ice Sheet =

Ice shelf in Antarctica

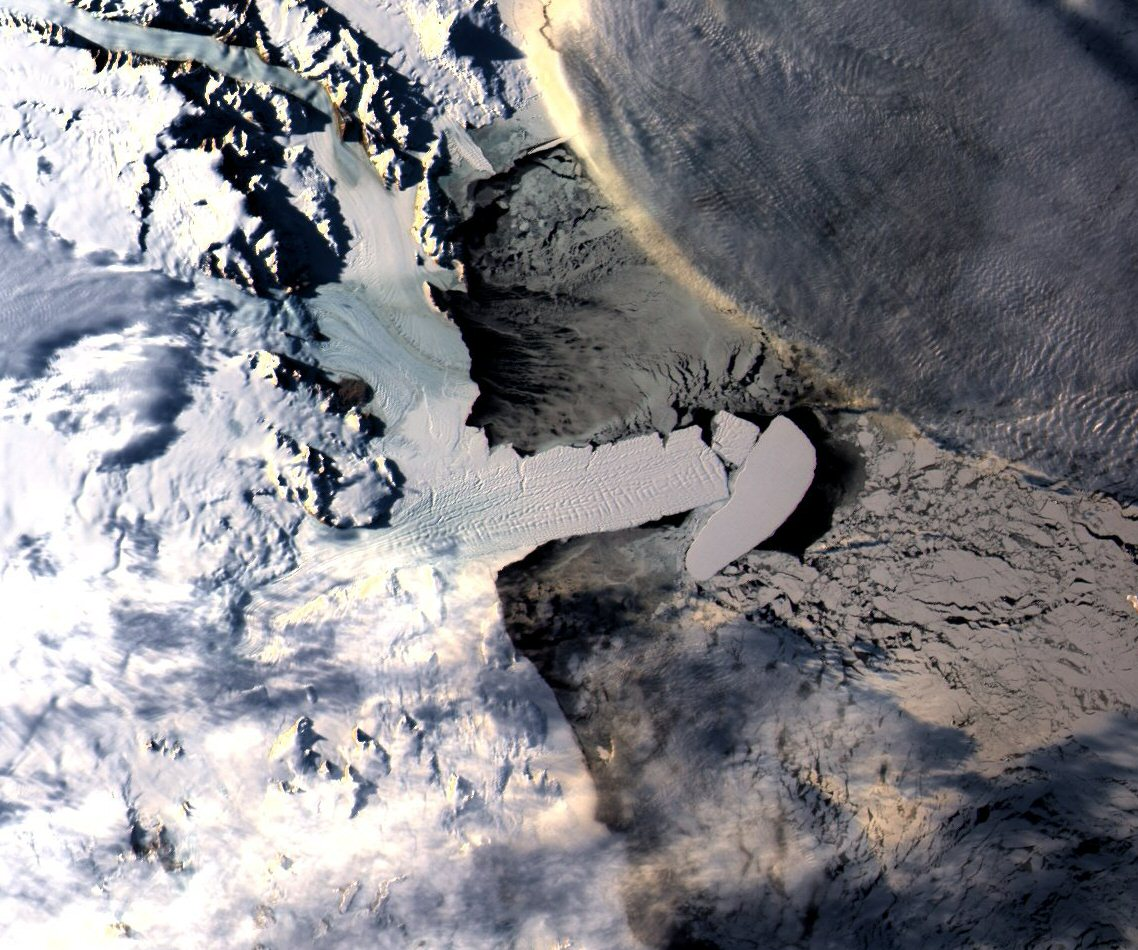

- Location within Antarctica
- Location: Victoria Land
- Coordinates: 74°53′S 163°10′E
- Terminus: Terra Nova Bay

Nansen Ice Sheet (74°53′S 163°10′E) is a 30 nautical miles (56 km; 35 mi) long by 10 nautical miles (19 km; 12 mi) wide ice shelf. It is nourished by the Priestley and Reeves Glaciers and abuts the north side of the Drygalski Ice Tongue, along the coast of Victoria Land, Antarctica. This feature was explored by the South Magnetic Polar Party of the British Antarctic Expedition, 1907-09 and by the Northern Party of the British Antarctic Expedition, 1910-13. Frank Debenham, geologist with the latter expedition, applied the name Nansen Sheet as the feature is adjacent to Mount Nansen, the dominating summit in the area.

== Geography ==
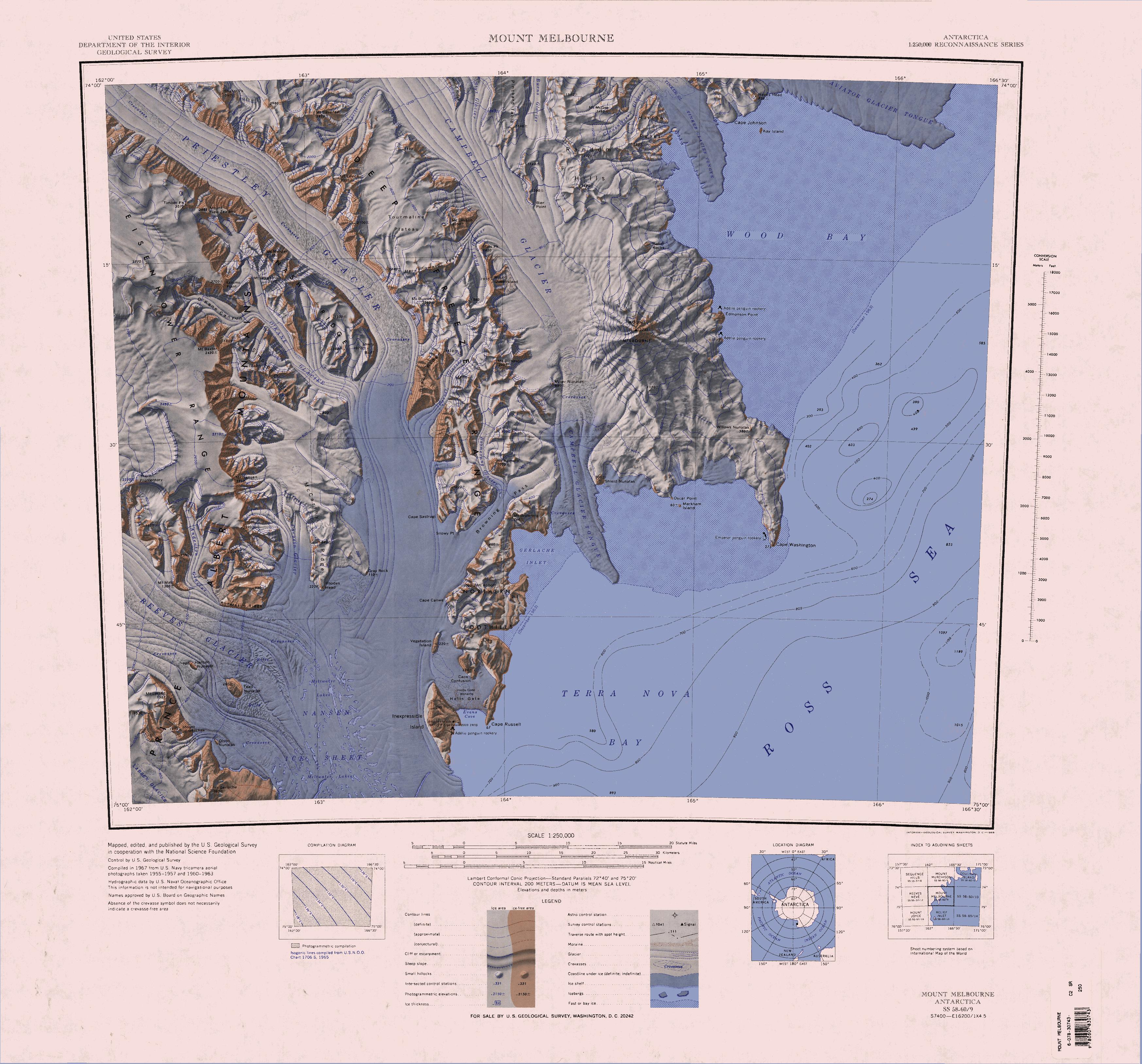
Terra Nova Bay in south center of map. Nansen Ice Shelf is darker blue area to the southeast

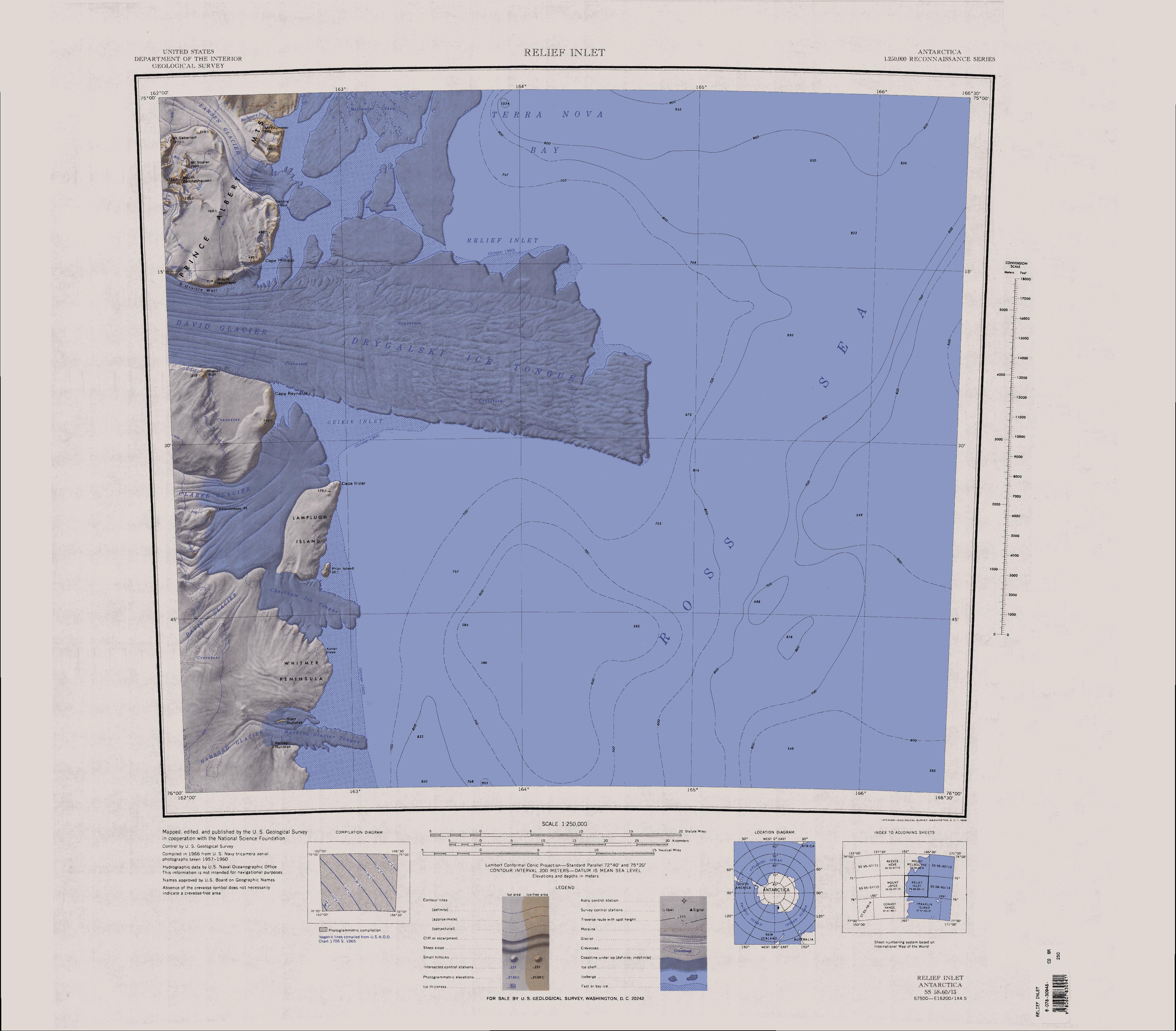
Terra Nova Bay in north center of map. Nansen Ice Shelf is darker blue area to the northeast

The Nansen Ice Sheet covers the southwest of Wood Bay, on the west coast of the Ross Sea. It is west of the Northern Foothills and east of the Prince Albert Mountains. From east to west it is fed by Browning Pass, Boomerang Glacier, the Priestley Glacier, the Carnein Glacier and the Reeves Glacier. The Larsen Glacier enters the sea to the southwest of the ice sheet. It abuts the Drygalski Ice Tongue to the south. Features surrounding the ice shelf include (anti-clockwise from the east) Inexpressible Island, Vegetation Island, Cape Canwe, Gray Rock and Rhodes Head on McCarthy Ridge, Andersson Ridge, Widowmaker Pass and Olson Nunatak.

== Features ==
Coastal features include:

=== Browning Pass ===
74°36′S 163°59′E. An ice-covered pass, 10 nautical miles (19 km; 12 mi) long, lying between the main mass of Deep Freeze Range and the Northern Foothills. The pass facilitates movement between the lower ends of Priestley and Campbell Glaciers. The feature was first mapped as a part of Campbell Glacier by the Northern Party of the BrAE, 1910-13. It was remapped by the Southern Party of NZGSAE, 1962-63, and named for Frank V. Browning, a member of the BrAE Northern Party, for whom nearby Mount Browning is also named.

=== Boomerang Glacier ===
74°33′S 163°54′E. A gently curving glacier, 10 nautical miles (19 km; 12 mi) long, draining southward from Mount Dickason in the Deep Freeze Range to enter Browning Pass, at the north side of Nansen Ice Sheet. Discovered by the Northern Party of the BrAE, 1910-13, and so named by them because of its shape.

=== Gray Rock ===
74°41′S 163°17′E. An isolated rock lying 4 nautical miles (7.4 km; 4.6 mi) ENE of Rhodes Head, at the southeast side of Eisenhower Range. Mapped by the United States Geological Survey (USGS) from surveys and United States Navy air photos, 1955-63. Named by the United States Advisory Committee on Antarctic Names (US-ACAN) for Alvin M. Gray, radioscience researcher at McMurdo Station, summer 1965-66.

=== Rhodes Head ===
74°42′S 163°03′E. A prominent headland forming the extremity of McCarthy Ridge on the southeast side of Eisenhower Range, overlooking the Nansen Ice Sheet. Mapped by USGS from surveys and United States Navy air photos, 1955-63. Named by US-ACAN for Captain James C. Rhodes, USMCR, an LC-130 aircraft commander with United States Navy Squadron VX-6 for several seasons to 1967.

=== McCarthy Ridge ===
74°37′S 163°03′E. A broad, mainly ice-covered ridge with steep sides forming the east wall of Carnein Glacier, in the foothills of southeast Eisenhower Range. Mapped by USGS from surveys and United States Navy air photos, 1955-63. Named by US-ACAN for Peter C. McCarthy, biolab manager at McMurdo Station, winter party 1966.

=== Carnein Glacier ===
74°41′S 162°54′E. A glacier draining the southeast corner of the Eisenhower Range, flowing south along the west side of McCarthy Ridge to merge with lower Reeves Glacier at the Nansen Ice Sheet. Mapped by USGS from surveys and USN air photos, 1955-63. Named by US-ACAN for Carl R. Carnein, glaciologist at McMurdo Station, summer 1965-66.

=== Widowmaker Pass ===
74°55′S 162°20′E. A heavily crevassed and therefore dangerous pass leading from Larsen Glacier to Reeves Glacier, between Mount Janetschek and Mount Gerlache. Given this expressive name by the New Zealand Geological Survey Antarctic Expedition (NZGSAE), 1962-63.

=== Olson Nunatak ===
74°55′S 162°28′E. A bare rock nunatak lying at the south side of the terminus of Reeves Glacier, 4 nautical miles (7.4 km; 4.6 mi) north of the summit of Mount Gerlache. Mapped by USGS from surveys and United States Navy air photos, 1955-63. Named by US-ACAN for James J. Olson, geophysicist with the USARP Ross Ice Shelf party in the 1961-62 season.

== Sources ==
- Alberts, Fred G., ed. (1995), Geographic Names of the Antarctic (PDF) (2 ed.), United States Board on Geographic Names This article incorporates public domain material from websites or documents of the United States Board on Geographic Names.
- Mount Melbourne.jpg, USGS: United States Geological Survey
- Relief Inlet, USGS: United States Geological Survey

This article incorporates public domain material from websites or documents of the United States Geological Survey.
