= Eisenhower Range =

Antarctic mountain range

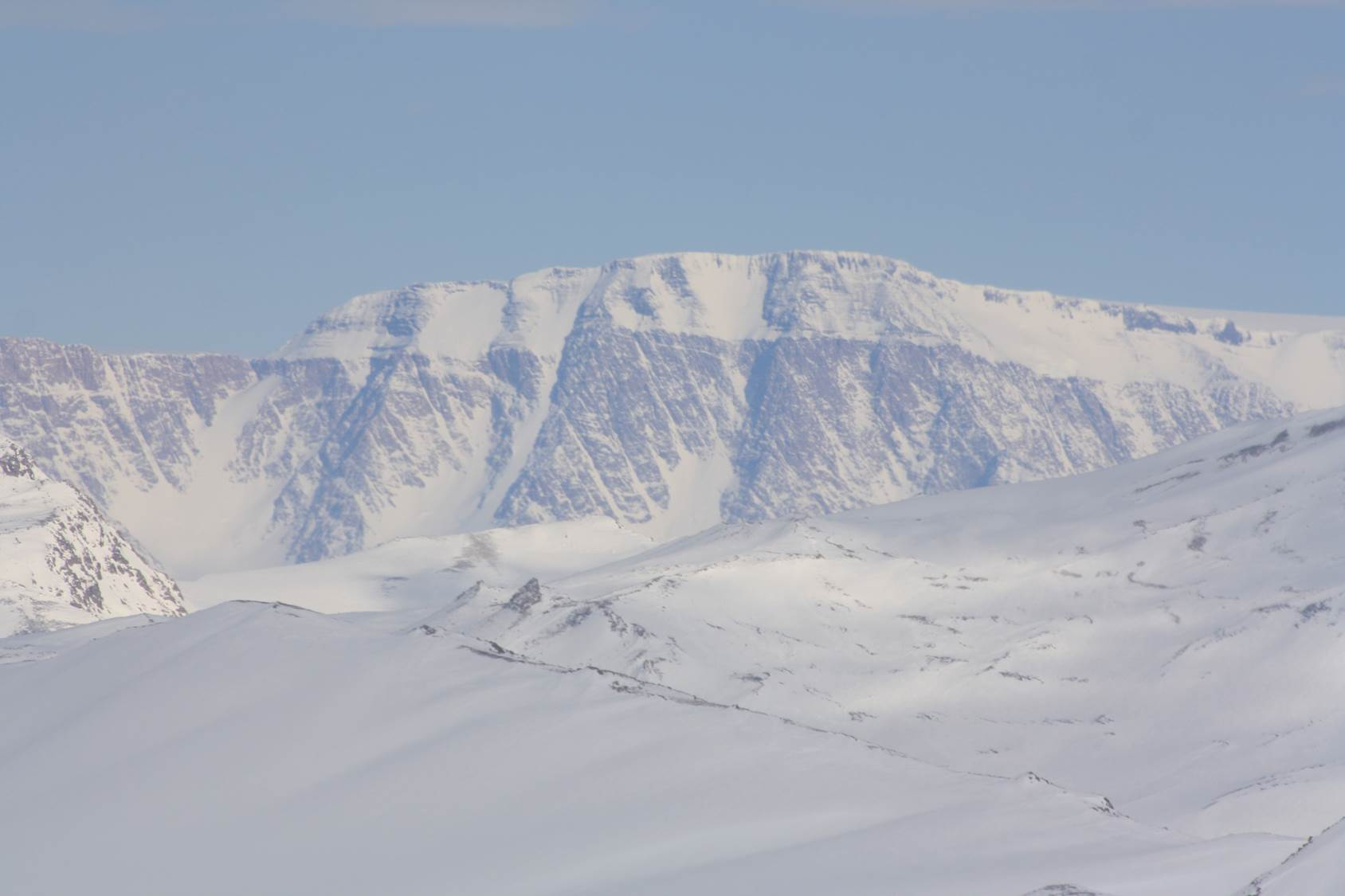
- Eisenhower Range

Geography
- Location within Antarctica
- Range coordinates: 74°15′S 162°15′E

The Eisenhower Range (74°15′S 162°15′E) is a majestic mountain range, about 45 nautical miles (83 km; 52 mi) long and rising to 3,070 metres (10,070 ft), which rises between Reeves Névé on the west, Reeves Glacier on the south, and Priestley Glacier on the north and east, in Victoria Land, Antarctica. The range is flat topped and descends gradually to Reeves Névé, but is steep cliffed and marked by sharp spurs along the Priestley Glacier. It is in the north of the Prince Albert Mountains, southwest of the Deep Freeze Range.

== Exploration and name ==
The Eisenhower Range was probably observed by most early expeditions due to its prominence as viewed from the Ross Sea. The range was mapped in detail by USGS from surveys and United States Navy air photos, 1955–63. It was named by the United States Advisory Committee on Antarctic Names (|US-ACAN) for Dwight D. Eisenhower, who was President of the United States in 1954, at the time when the U.S. Navy's Operation Deep Freeze expeditions to Antarctica were initiated.

== Location ==
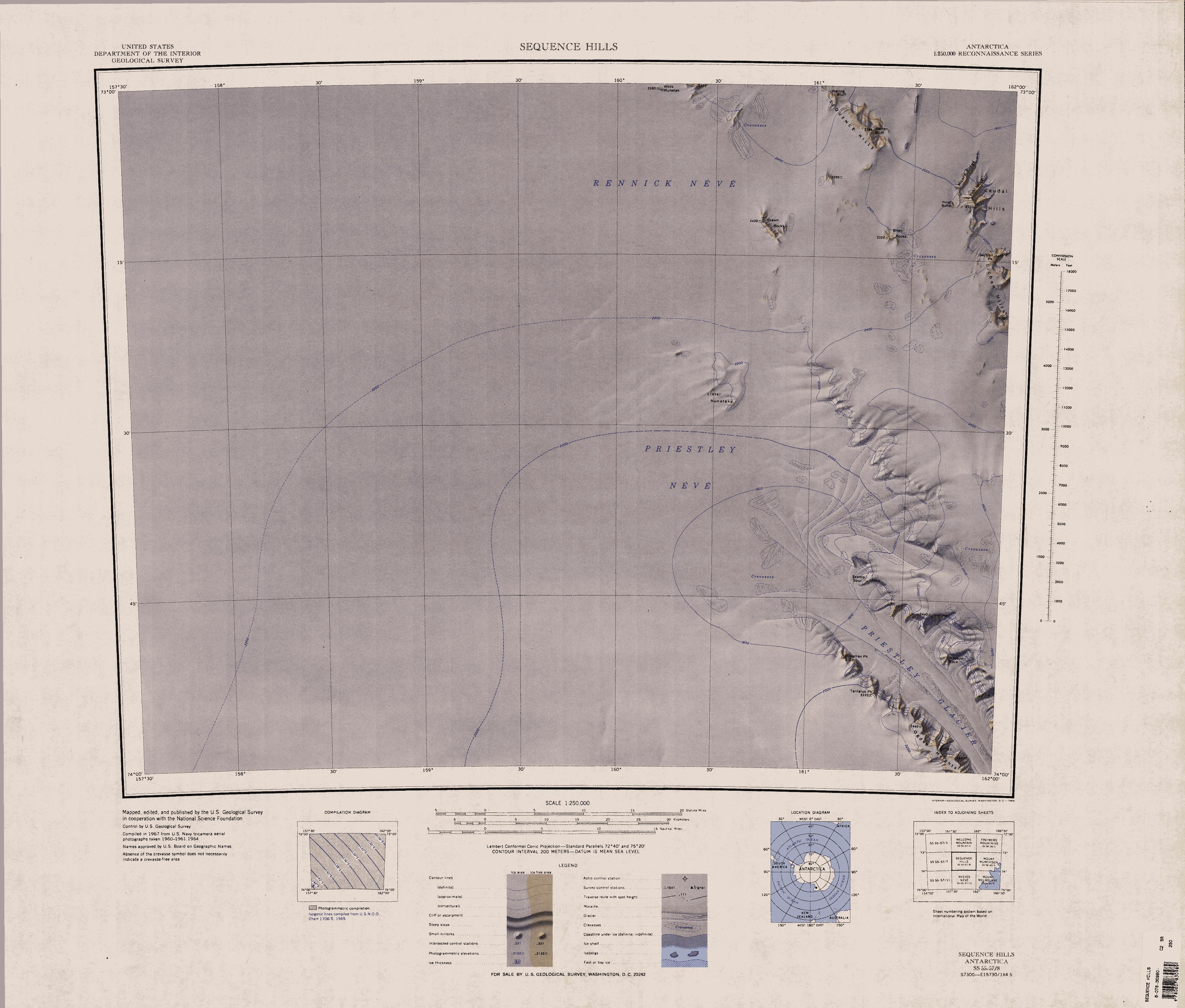
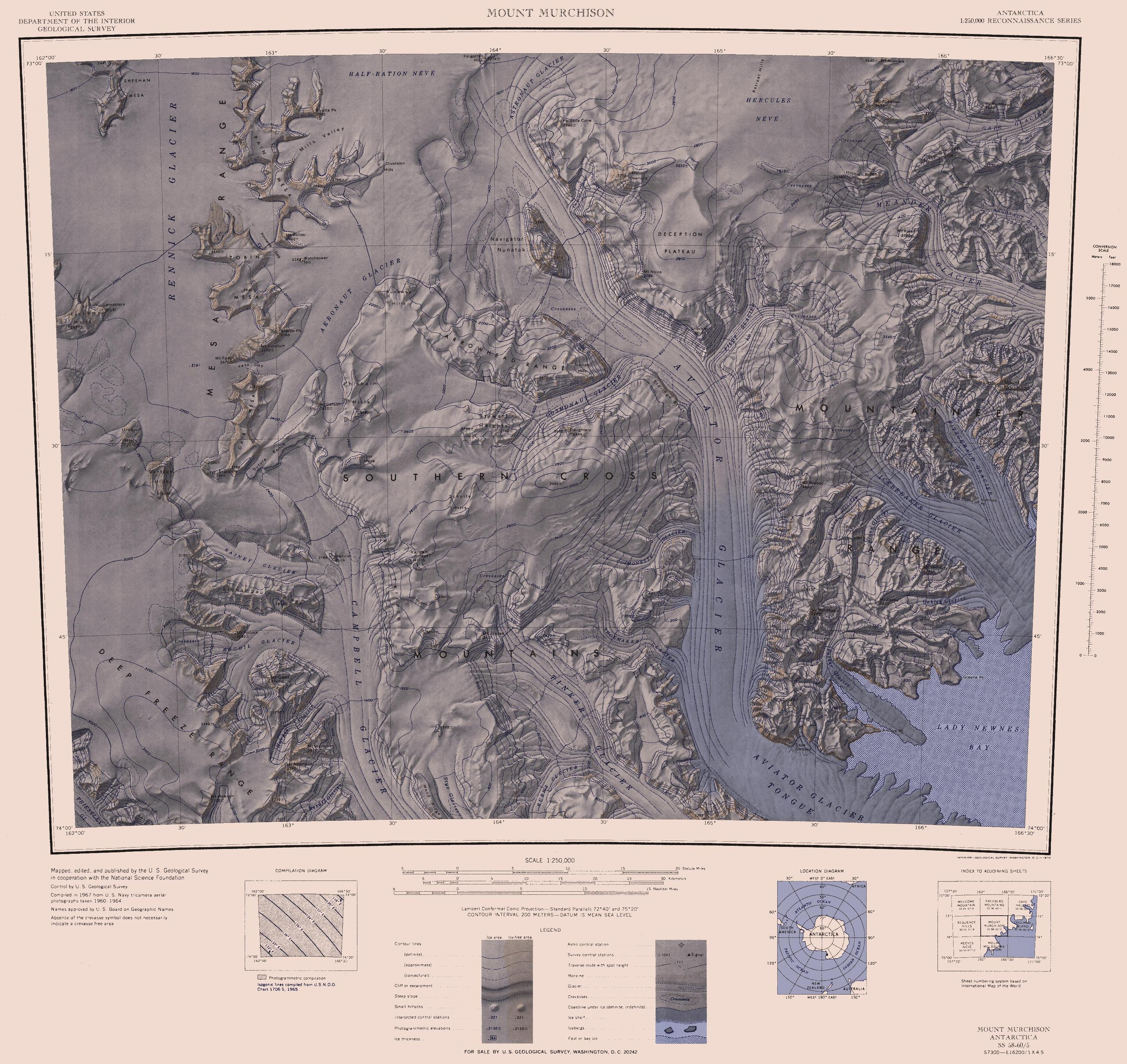

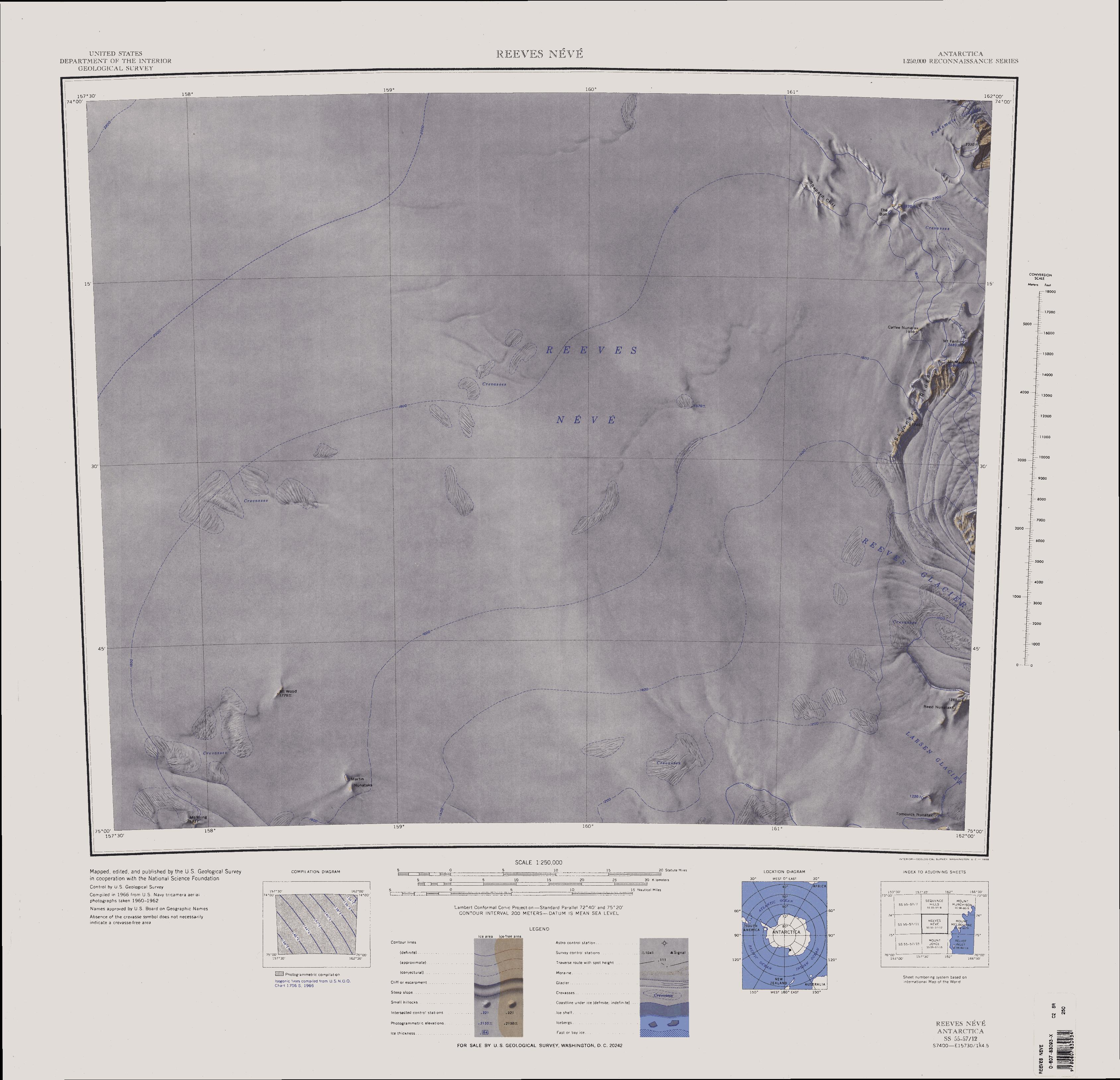
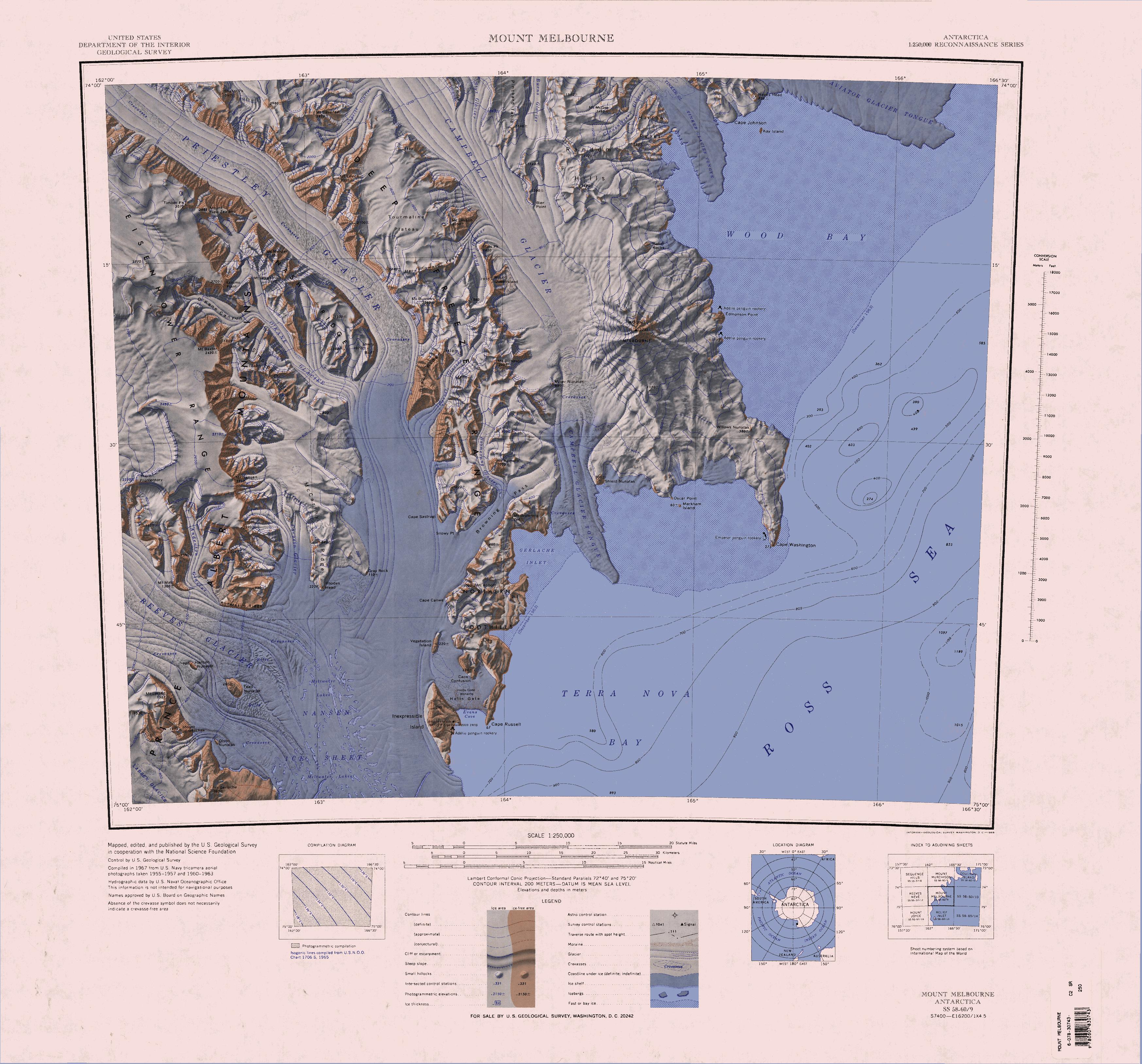
Eisenhower range extends from northwest to southeast to the southwest of the Priestley Glacier

The Eisenhower Range is in the Prince Albert Mountains. The northwestern tip of the range defines the southwest edge of the upper Priestley Glacier, and includes Clingman Peak, Tantalus Peak and the Ogden Heights. The southwest extension of the range includes Calfee Nunatak, Mount Fenton, Mount Macintosh and Skinner Ridge, reaching down to the head of the Reeves Glacier. The main southeast escarpment of the range includes Timber Peak, Mount New Zealand and Nash Ridge along the Priestley Glacier, and Mount Baxter, Simpson Crags, Mount Nansen, Thern Promontory, Mount Matz, Andersson Ridge, McCarthy Ridge, Rhodes Head and Gray Rock.

Mountains of this range include Mount Baxter (2430 m) and Mount Nansen (2740 m).

== Western features ==
=== Calfee Nunatak ===
74°19'S, 161°40'E

An isolated nunatak at the E side of Reeves Neve, 4 mi W of Mount Fenton, in Victoria Land. Mapped by USGS from surveys and U.S. Navy aerial photographs, 1956-62. Named by US-ACAN for David W. Calfee, field assistant at McMurdo Station, 1965-66.

=== Mount Fenton ===
74°20'S, 161°55'E

A peak (2,480 m) rising from the northern part of Skinner Ridge, 2 mi NE of Mount Mackintosh, in Victoria Land. Mapped by USGS from surveys and U.S. Navy air photos, 1956-62. Named by US-ACAN for Michael D. Fenton, geologist at McMurdo Station, 1965-66.

=== Mount Macintosh ===
74°22'S, 161°49'E

A peak (2,300 m) that rises from Skinner Ridge, 2 mi SW of Mount Fenton, on the western margin of the Eisenhower Range of Victoria Land. Charted by the BrAE (1907-09) under Ernest Shackleton, who named it for A.L.A. Mackintosh, Second Officer on the expedition ship, the Nimrod.

=== Skinner Ridge ===
74°24'S, 161°45'E

A ridge, 12 mi long, that descends southwestward from the western side of Eisenhower Range in Victoria Land. Mounts Fenton and Mackintosh are astride the northern part of this ridge. The feature was visited by the Southern Party of the NZGSAE (1962-63), who named it for D.N.B. Skinner, geologist with the expedition.

== Eastern features ==
=== Mount Baxter ===
74°22'S, 162°32'E

A large buttress-type mountain, 2,430 m, located just S of O'Kane Canyon where it forms a rounded projection of the E escarpment of Eisenhower Range, in Victoria Land. Discovered by the BrNAE (1901-04) under Scott, who named it for Sir George and Lady Baxter of Dundee, supporters of the expedition.

=== Simpson Crags ===
74°24'S, 162°45'E

A series of rugged crags descending SE from Mount Baxter of the Eisenhower Range and forming the S wall of O'Kane Glacier. Mapped by USGS from surveys and USN air photos, 1955-63. Named by US-ACAN for Lt. Cdr. William A. Simpson, Jr., USN, aircraft commander with Squadron VX-6 during USN OpDFrz 1967.

=== Mount Nansen ===
74°33'S, 162°36'E

A prominent mountain, 2,740 m, surmounting the steep eastern escarpment of the Eisenhower Range, 11 mi S of Mount Baxter, in Victoria Land. Discovered by the BrNAE, 1901-04, and named for Fridtjof Nansen, Norwegian Arctic explorer from whom Capt. Scott obtained much practical information for his expedition.

=== Thern Promontory ===
74°33'S, 162°06'E

A high, ice-covered promontory, 2,220 m, forming a westward projection at the S end of Eisenhower Range, about 7 mi W of Mount Nansen, in Victoria Land. Named by US-ACAN for Michael G. Them, station engineer at McMurdo Station with the 1965-66 summer party and the 1967 winter party.

=== Mount Matz ===
74°42'S, 162°17'E

A mountain, 1,300 m, at the W side of the terminus of Anderton Glacier, forming the end of a ridge descending S from Elsenhower Range to Reeves Glacier, in Victoria Land. Mapped by USGS from surveys and USN air photos, 1955-63. Named by US-ACAN for David B. Matz, geologist at McMurdo Station, 1965-66 season.

=== McCarthy Ridge ===
74°37'S, 163°03'E

A broad, mainly ice-covered ridge with steep sides forming the E wall of Carnein Glacier, in the foothills of SE Eisenhower Range. Mapped by USGS from surveys and USN air photos, 1955-63. Named by US-ACAN for Peter C. McCarthy, biolab manager at McMurdo Station, winter party 1966.

== Sources ==
- Alberts, Fred G., ed. (1995), Geographic Names of the Antarctic (PDF) (2 ed.), United States Board on Geographic Names This article incorporates public domain material from websites or documents of the United States Board on Geographic Names.
- Mount Melbourne, USGS: United States Geographic Board
- Reeves Névé, USGS: United States Geological Survey
- Sequence Hills, USGS: United States Geological Survey

This article incorporates public domain material from websites or documents of the United States Geological Survey.
