= Mount Baxter =

Mount Baxter may refer to:

- Mount Baxter (California), a mountain in the Sierra Nevada range of California
- Mount Baxter (Antarctica), a mountain in Antarctica
- Baxter Peak, the highest point on Mount Katahdin, the centerpiece of Baxter State Park, Maine
