= Northern Foothills =

Line of coastal hills on the west side of Terra Nova Bay, Victoria Land, Antarctica

- Location within Antarctica

Geography
- Continent: Antarctica
- Region(s): Victoria Land, Antarctica
- Range coordinates: 74°44′S 163°55′E
- Parent range: Deep Freeze Range

Northern Foothills (74°44′S 163°55′E) is a line of coastal hills on the west side of Terra Nova Bay, Victoria Land, Antarctica, lying southward of Browning Pass and forming a peninsular continuation of the Deep Freeze Range. It was named by the Northern Party of the British Antarctic Expedition, 1910–13 (BrAE), because during field operations Inexpressible Island, close southward, was originally referred to as the "Southern Foothills."

== Location ==
The Northern Foothills are separated from the rest of the Deep Freeze Range by the Browning Pass. The Campbell Glacier Tongue reaches into Terra Nova Bay to the east of the north end of the foothills. Gerlache Inlet lies between the foothills and the ice tongue. At the southern end of the foothills, Hells Gate separates the foothills from Inexpressible Island to the southwest. The mouth of the Priestley Glacier flows past the western side of the foothills, merging into the Nansen Ice Sheet.

== Features ==
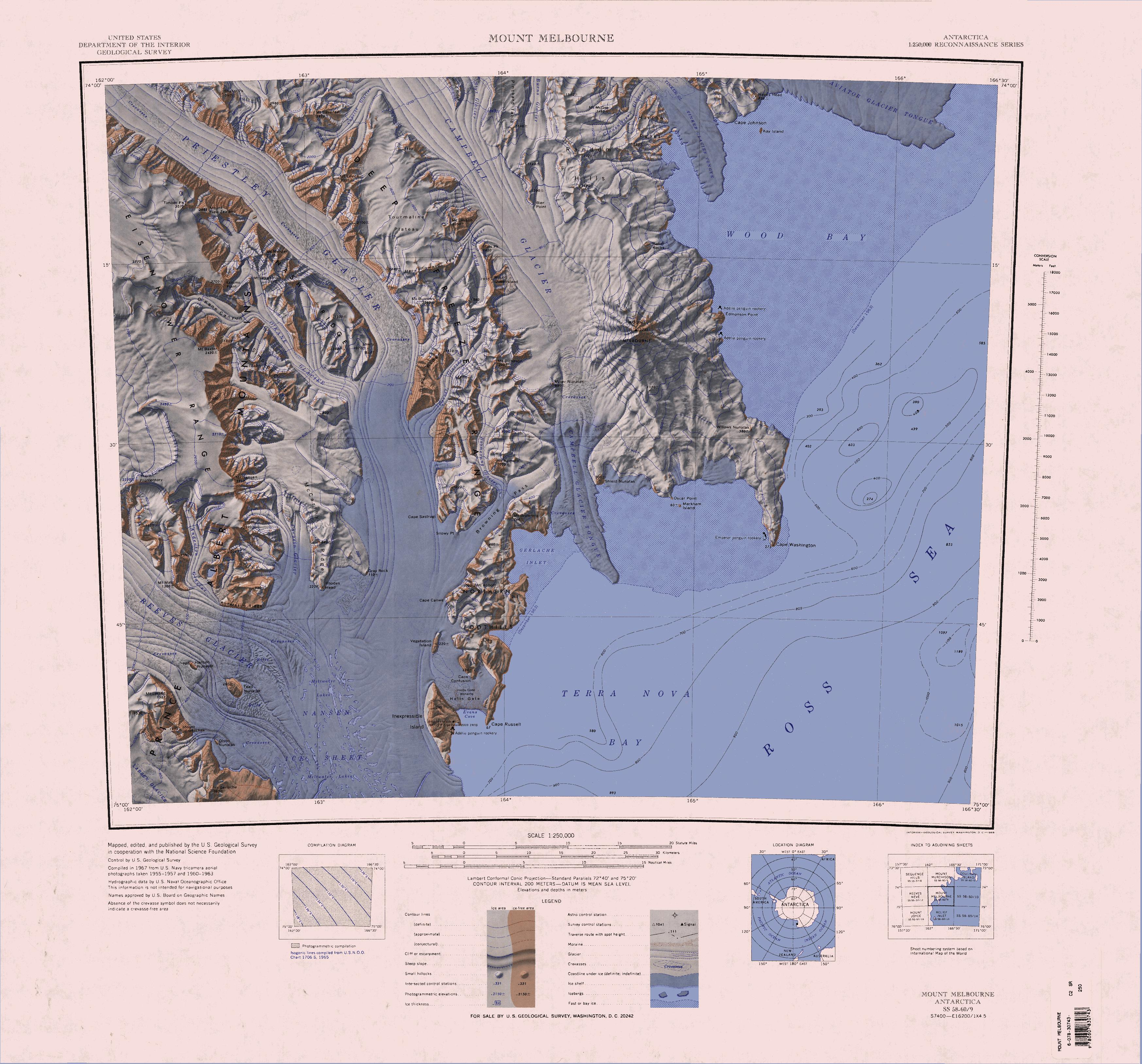
Northern Foothills between ice shelf and sea in south center of map

Features of the Northern Foothills, from north to south, include Mount Browning, Mount Abbot, Cape Canwe, Vegetation Island, Cape Confusion, Hells Gate, Hells Gate Moraine, Evans Cove and Cape Russell.

=== Mount Browning ===
74°37′S 164°03′E. A mountain, 760 metres (2,490 ft) high, which rises opposite the terminus of Boomerang Glacier in the Northern Foothills. First roughly mapped by the British Antarctic Expedition, 1907–09. This area was explored and mapped in greater detail by the Northern Party of the BrAE, 1910-13, and the mountain named for Petty Officer Frank V. Browning, RN, a member of the Northern Party.

=== Mount Abbot ===
74°42′S 163°50′E. A mountain 1,020 metres (3,350 ft) high, which stands 3 nautical miles (5.6 km; 3.5 mi) northeast of Cape Canwe and is the highest point in the Northern Foothills. Mapped by the Northern Party of the BrAE, 1910-13, and named for Petty Officer George P. Abbott, RN, a member of the expedition.

=== Cape Canwe ===
74°43′S 163°41′E. A high rock bluff 3 nautical miles (5.6 km; 3.5 mi) north of Vegetation Island, forming the west extremity of the Northern Foothills. First explored and named by the Northern Party of the BrAE, 1910-13. The name arose from seeing this feature a long way off and wondering whether they could reach it.

=== Vegetation Island ===
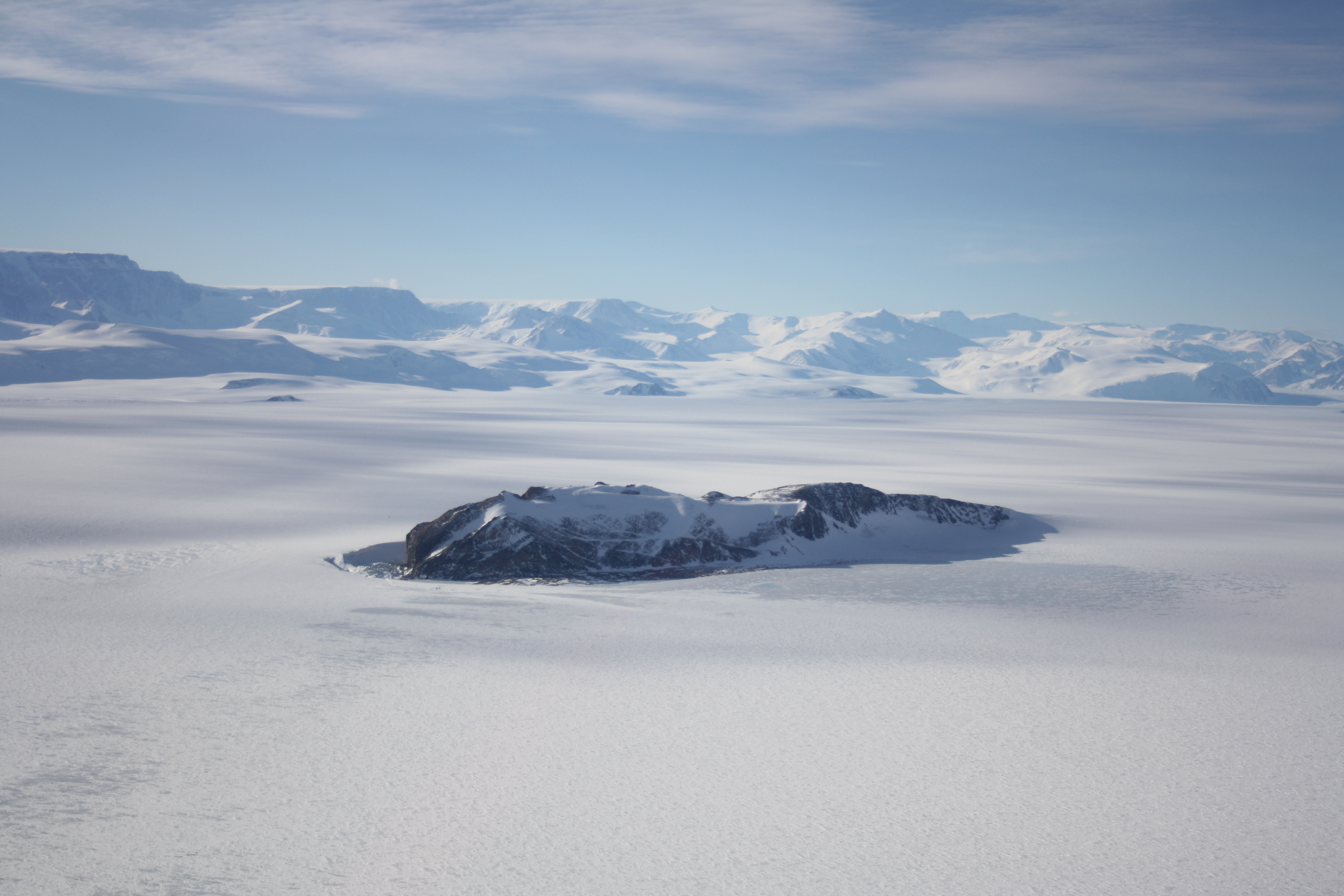
Vegetation Island in 2018

74°47′S 163°37′E. A narrow island lying 2 nautical miles (3.7 km; 2.3 mi) north of Inexpressible Island and just west of the Northern Foothills. Discovered by the Northern Party of the BrAE, 1910-13, who named it because the rocks were densely covered with lichens.

=== Cape Confusion ===
74°50′S 163°50′E. A rocky point which projects from the southwest part of the Northern Foothills, 4 nautical miles (7.4 km; 4.6 mi) northwest of Cape Russell. Visited by the Southern Party of the New Zealand Geological Survey Antarctic Expedition (NZGSAE), 1962-63, which gave the name because of the complex geological structure of the area.

=== Hells Gate ===
74°51′S 163°48′E. A narrows located near the east edge of the Nansen Ice Sheet, lying just north of Evans Cove between Inexpressible Island and the Northern Foothills. First explored and mapped by the Northern Party of the BrAE, 1910-13, who gave the feature this expressive name.

=== Hells Gate Moraine ===
74°52′S 163°48′E. The glacial moraine at Hells Gate, at the head of Evans Cove. The moraine extends southward to Hells Gate from nearby Vegetation Island and Cape Confusion. Mapped and named by the Northern Party of BrAE, 1910-13, in association with Hells Gate.

=== Cape Russell ===
74°54′S 163°54′E. A rock cape in Terra Nova Bay, forming the south extremity of the Northern Foothills. Named by the United States Advisory Committee on Antarctic Names (US-ACAN) for Lieutenant Commander R.E. Russell, United States Navy, officer in charge of the helicopter unit aboard the icebreaker Glacier in this area during United States Navy Operation Deep Freeze, 1958-59.

== See also ==
- Zucchelli Station, an Italian seasonal research station at Terra Nova Bay on a granitic headland along the coast of the Northern Foothills to the north-east of Gerlache Inlet.

== Sources ==
- Alberts, Fred G., ed. (1995), Geographic Names of the Antarctic (PDF) (2 ed.), United States Board on Geographic Names This article incorporates public domain material from websites or documents of the United States Board on Geographic Names.
- Mount Melbourne, USGS: United States Geographic Board

This article incorporates public domain material from websites or documents of the United States Geological Survey.
