= Nash Ridge =

Ridge in Antarctica

- Location within Antarctica

Geography
- Range coordinates: 74°17′S 163°0′E

Nash Ridge (74°17′S 163°0′E) is a high, massive ridge of eastern Eisenhower Range, about 10 nautical miles (19 km; 12 mi) long and 5 nautical miles (9.3 km; 5.8 mi) wide, projecting between the flow of the O'Kane Glacier and Priestley Glacier, in Victoria Land, Antarctica.

== Exploration and naming ==
Nash Ridge was mapped by United States Geological Survey (USGS) from surveys and United States Navy air photos, 1955–63. It was named by the United States Advisory Committee on Antarctic Names (US-ACAN) for Harold A. Nash, biologist at McMurdo Station in the 1965-66 and 1966–67 seasons.

== Location ==
Nash Ridge trends in a northwest-southeast direction. The Priestly Glacier flows past the northeast side of the ridge, and the O'Kane Glacier flows down the southwest side. They join at the southern tip of the ridge. Features of the ridge, from north to south, include Mount Meister, Mount Borgstrom and Lowry Bluff. Nearby features include Eskimo Point, to the west, and Mount New Zealand and Timber Peak to the northwest.

== Features ==
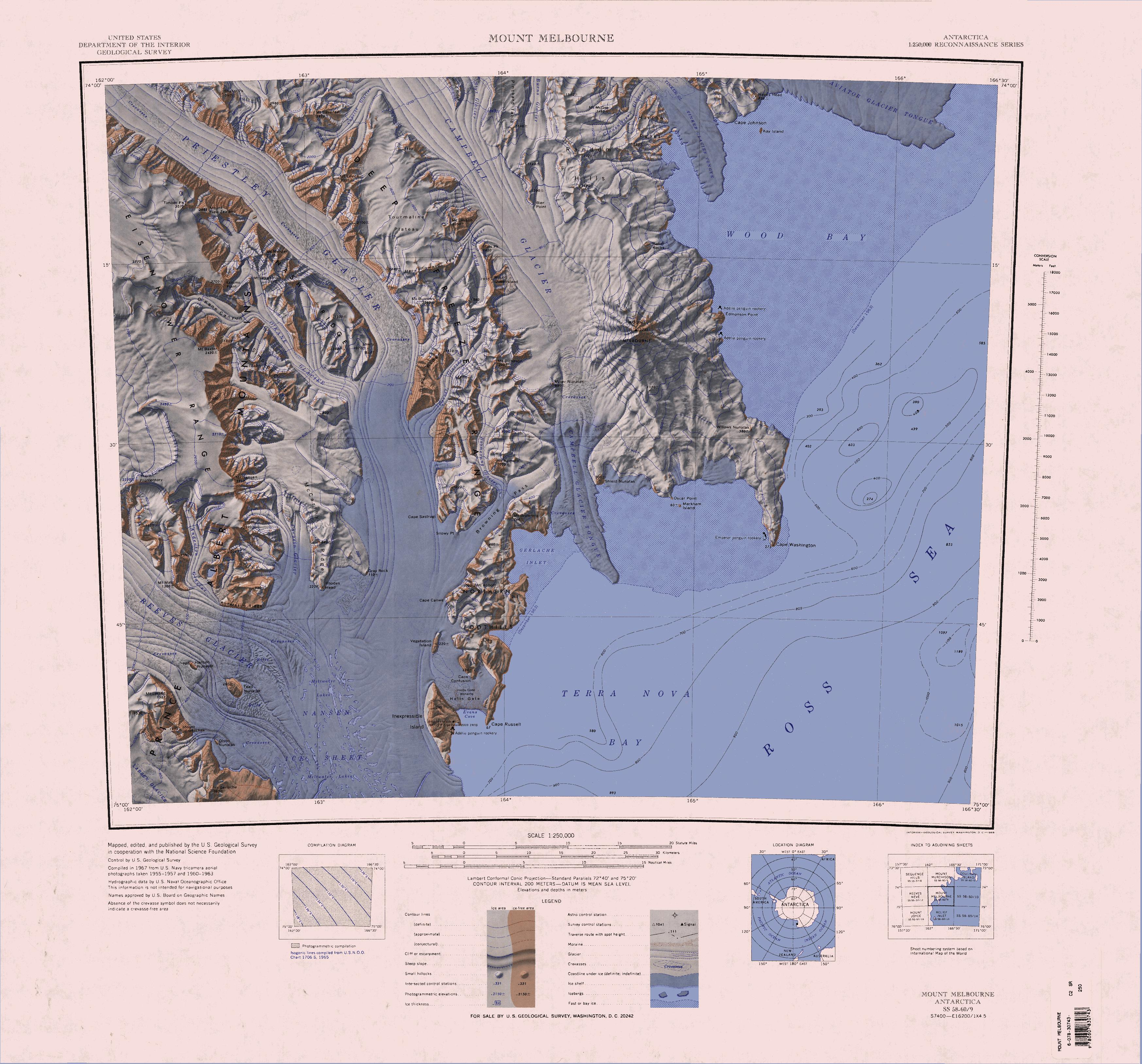
Nash ridge in northwest of map

Features and nearby features include, from north to south:

=== Timber Peak ===
74°10′S 162°23′E. A high peak 3,070 metres (10,070 ft) high above Priestley Glacier, on the south side. The peak is 2 nautical miles (3.7 km; 2.3 mi) west-northwest of the summit of Mount New Zealand. The Southern Party of the New Zealand Geological Survey Antarctic Expedition (NZGSAE) (1962-63) gave this name because petrified sections of tree branches were found in sandstone deposits at this point.

=== Mount New Zealand ===
74°11′S 162°30′E. A large mountain, 2,890 metres (9,480 ft) high, standing immediately northwest of Nash Ridge on the south side of Priestley Glacier. Discovered by the British National Antarctic Expedition (BrNAE), 1901-04, which named this mountain in recognition of the generous assistance given the expedition by the Government and people of New Zealand.

=== Mount Meister ===
74°14′S 162°47′E. A mountain, 2,520 metres (8,270 ft) high, on the west side of Priestley Glacier, surmounting the north end of Nash Ridge. Mapped by USGS from surveys and United States Navy air photos, 1955-63. Named by US-ACAN for Laurent J. Meister, geologist at McMurdo Station, 1965-66 season.

=== Mount Borgstrom ===
74°16′S 162°53′E. A mountain, 2,610 metres (8,560 ft) high, rising 2 nautical miles (3.7 km; 2.3 mi) southeast of Mount Meister on Nash Ridge. Mapped by USGS from surveys and United States Navy air photos, 1955-63. Named by US-ACAN for Commander Charles O. Borgstrom, air operations officer with United States Navy Squadron VX-6 during Operation Deep Freeze 1966.

=== Eskimo Point ===
74°17′S 162°33′E. A flat-topped, steep-sided promontory which protrudes from the east side of Eisenhower Range and forms the north wall of O'Kane Canyon. So named by the Southern Party of NZGSAE, 1962-63, which camped on its upper surface and built an igloo while waiting for white-out conditions to lift.

=== Lowry Bluff ===
74°22′S 163°19′E. A bluff, 1,070 metres (3,510 ft) high, forming the east extremity of Nash Ridge. Mapped by USGS from surveys and United States Navy air photos, 1955-63. Named by US-ACAN for George Lowry, biologist at McMurdo Station, 1965-66 season.

== Sources ==
- Alberts, Fred G., ed. (1995), Geographic Names of the Antarctic (PDF) (2 ed.), United States Board on Geographic Names This article incorporates public domain material from websites or documents of the United States Board on Geographic Names.
- Mount Melbourne, USGS: United States Geographic Board

This article incorporates public domain material from websites or documents of the United States Geological Survey.
