= Mount Nansen =

Mount Nansen may refer to:

- Mount Nansen (Antarctica)
- Mount Fridtjof Nansen in Antarctica
- Mount Nansen (Yukon) in Yukon, Canada
