= Mount Nansen (Antarctica) =

Mountain in Ross Dependency, Antarctica

Highest point
- Elevation: 2,740 m (8,990 ft)
- Coordinates: 74°33′S 162°36′E

Geography
- Location: Victoria Land, Antarctica
- Parent range: Eisenhower Range

Mount Nansen is a prominent mountain, surmounting the steep eastern escarpment of the Eisenhower Range, 17 km (11 mi) south of Mount Baxter, in Victoria Land. Discovered by the British National Antarctic Expedition (1901–04), and named for Fridtjof Nansen, Norwegian Arctic explorer from whom Capt. Scott obtained much practical information for his expedition.
