= Shield Nunatak =

Nunatak in Victoria Land, Antarctica

Shield Nunatak (74°33′S 164°30′E) is a prominent nunatak standing at the east side of the terminus of Campbell Glacier on the north shore of Terra Nova Bay, Victoria Land. This feature, a multiple volcanic cone, was so named by the New Zealand Geological Survey Antarctic Expedition (NZGSAE), 1965–66, because it looks like an old Viking shield.

Shield Nunatak is described as a basalt tuya in the Encyclopedia of Quaternary Science.
