= Campbell Glacier =

Glacier in Antarctica

- Location within Antarctica
- Location: Victoria Land
- Coordinates: 74°25′S 164°22′E
- Terminus: Terra Nova Bay

Campbell Glacier (74°25′S 164°22′E) is a glacier, about 60 nautical miles (110 km; 69 mi) long, originating near the south end of Mesa Range and draining southeast between the Deep Freeze Range and Mount Melbourne to discharge into north Terra Nova Bay in Victoria Land, Antarctica.

== Location ==
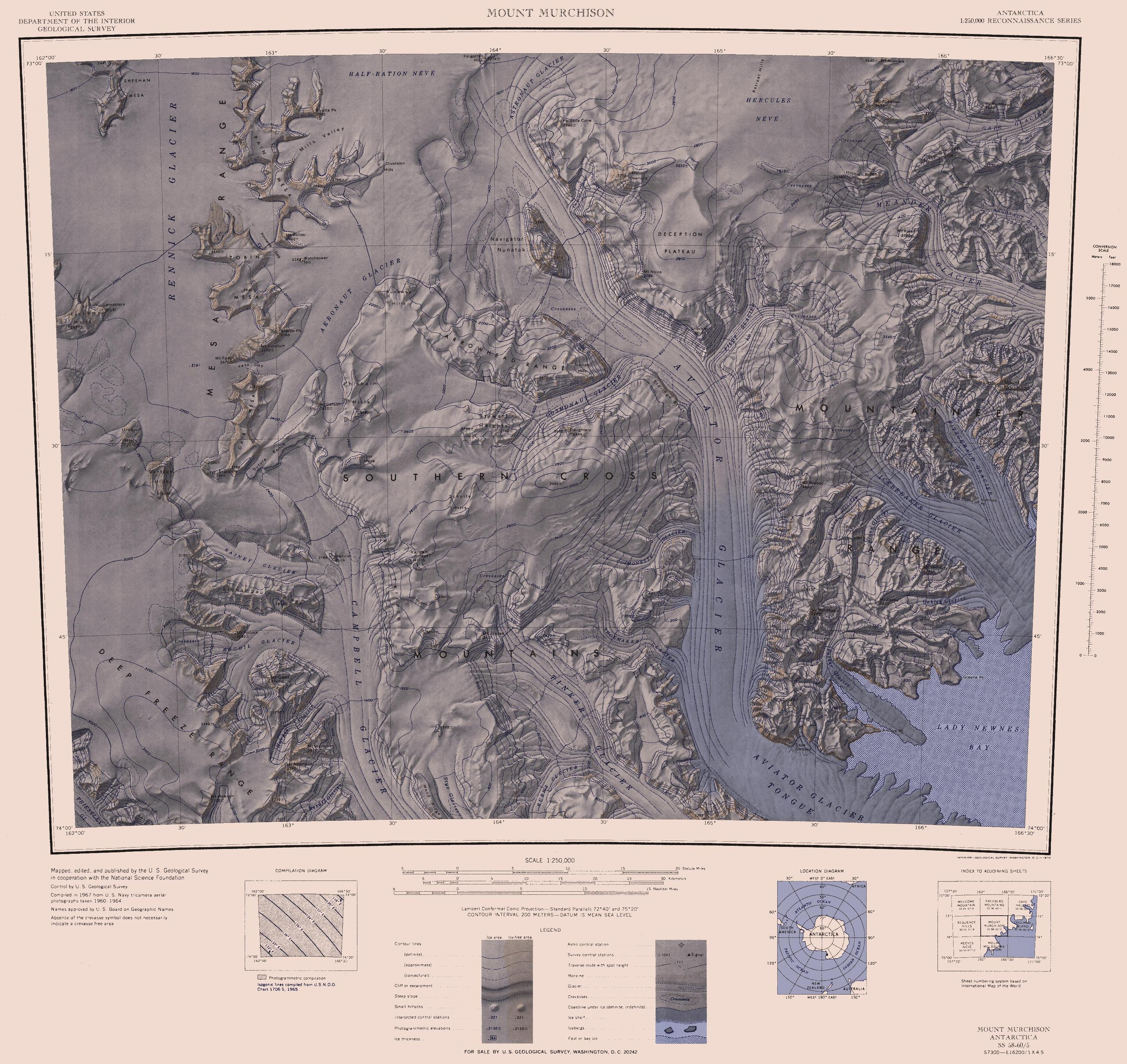
Upper part of the glacier southwest of center of map

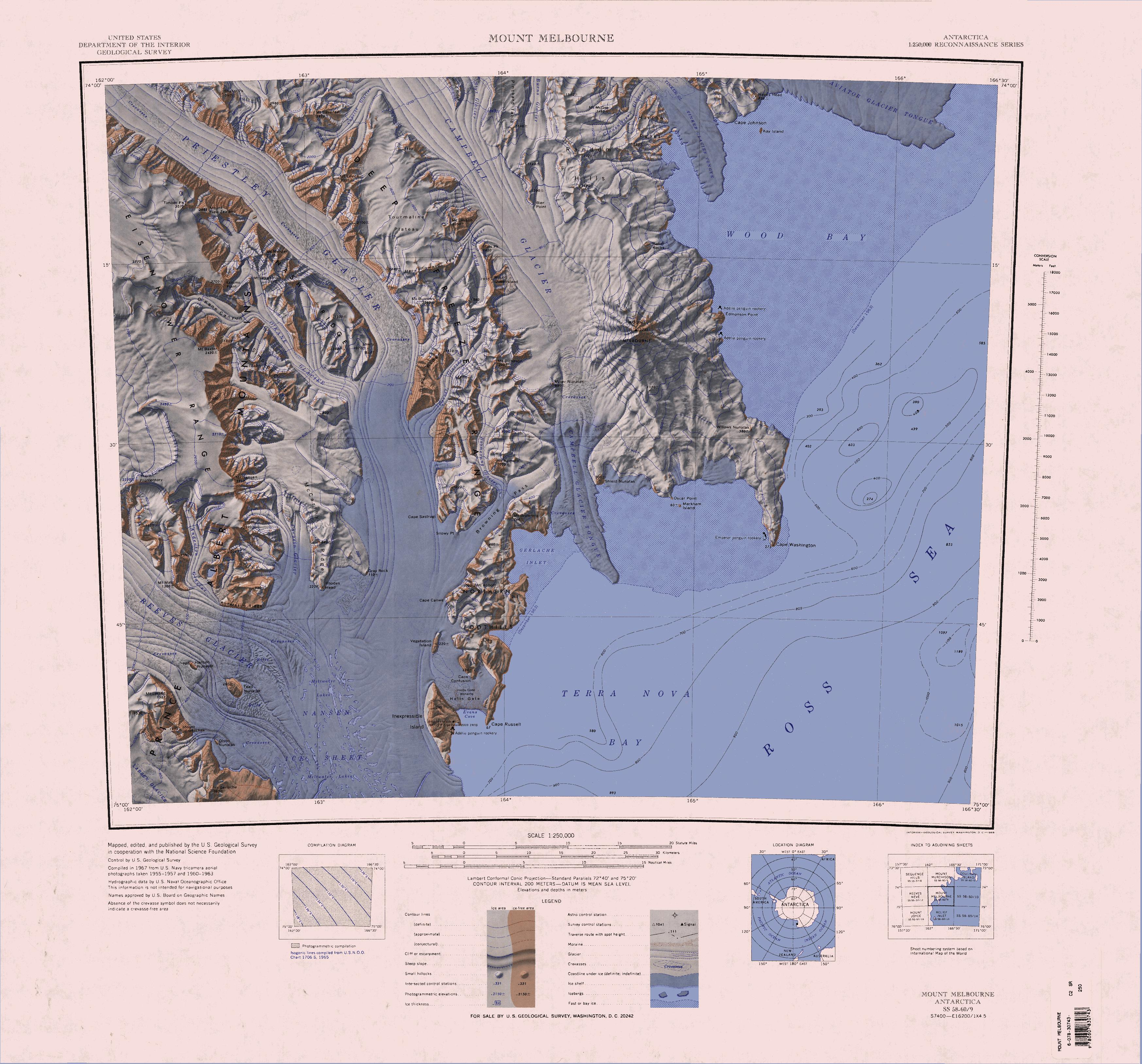
Lower part of the glacier in north center of map

Campbell Glacier forms in the Southern Cross Mountains to the south of Gair Mesa and Suture Bench. It flows south past both sides of Mericle Rock, and is joined from the west by Rainey Glacier. Hedge Terrace forms its eastern side in this section. Below Archambau Ridge it is joined from the west by Recoil Glacier, and past Mount Gibbs it is joined from the southwest by Harper Glacier. Further south Rebuff Glacier joins from the west. It continues south past Wood Ridge to the east and the Deep Freeze Range to the west. Capsize Glacier joins it from the west below Mount Cavaney. Styx Glacier joins from the east past the end of Wood Ridge. Further south Bates Glacier joins from the west to the north of Mills Peak. The glacier flows past Mount Melbourne to the east and Miller Nunatak to the west, and forms the Campbell Glacier Tongue where it disgorges into Terra Nova Bay past Shield Nunatak.

== Exploration and name ==
The lower end of the glacier was observed by the Northern Party, led by Lieutenant Victor Campbell, Royal Navy, of the British Antarctic Expedition, 1910–13. It was named for the leader of this party. The extent of the glacier and its discharge into north Terra Nova Bay, rather than the Nansen Ice Sheet, was determined by United States and New Zealand survey parties to the area in 1961–62 and 1962–63.

== Left tributaries ==
Named tributaries from the left (east) include:

=== Styx Glacier ===
74°02′S 163°51′E. A tributary glacier in the Southern Cross Mountains, flowing southeast to enter Campbell Glacier between Wood Ridge and Pinckard Table. Observed by the Northern Party of the New Zealand Geological Survey Antarctic Expedition (NZGSAE), 1965–66, which named it after the mythical river Styx.

== Right tributaries ==
Named tributaries from the right (west) include, from north to south:

=== Rainey Glacier ===
73°40′S 163°06′E. A tributary glacier on the north side of Archambault Ridge, descending from the Deep Freeze Range into Campbell Glacier. Named by the northern party of NZGSAE, 1962-63, for Denys Rainey, cartographer, who assisted this and other New Zealand Antarctic expeditions with their mapping problems.

=== Recoil Glacier ===
73°46′S 163°05′E. A tributary glacier descending from the Deep Freeze Range, south of Mount Pollock, to the Campbell Glacier. Named by the northern party of NZGSAE, 1962-63, because the geologist was said to have "recoiled in disgust" on finding little of geological interest there and not what he expected.

=== Harper Glacier ===
73°52′S 163°05′E. A small tributary glacier which descends northeast between Mount Gibbs and Mount Adamson of the Deep Freeze Range to enter Campbell Glacier. Mapped by the United States Geological Survey (USGS) from surveys and United States Navy air photos, 1960-64. Named by the United States Advisory Committee on Antarctic Names (US-ACAN) for Wayne M. Harper, satellite geodesist at McMurdo Station, 1964-65.

=== Rebuff Glacier ===
73°58′S 163°12′E. A tributary glacier descending from the Deep Freeze Range and entering Campbell Glacier 4 nautical miles (7.4 km; 4.6 mi) southeast of the summit of Mount Mankinen. Named by the northern party of NZGSAE, 1962-63, because the party was prevented from getting access to it.

=== Capsize Glacier ===
74°02′S 163°20′E. A tributary glacier in Deep Freeze Range, draining the slopes between Mount Cavaney and Mount Levick and flowing northeast to enter the Campbell Glacier. So named by the Northern Party of NZGSAE, 1965-66, because of the spectacular spill which the party had there.

=== Bates Glacier ===
74°13′S 163°51′E. A small tributary glacier flowing north from the west side of Mount Queensland, and entering the west side of Campbell Glacier just north of Mills Peak. Named by the Northern Party of the NZGSAE, 1965-66, for D.R. Bates, field assistant with that party.

== Other features ==
Other features along its course are, from north to south:

=== Mericle Rock ===
73°39′S 163°15′E. A nunatak in the middle of Campbell Glacier, approximately 9 nautical miles (17 km; 10 mi) from its head. Mapped by USGS from surveys and United States Navy air photos, 1960-64. Named by US-ACAN for David L. Mericle, United States Navy, electronics technician at McMurdo Station, 1967.

=== Archambault Ridge ===
73°42′S 162°55′E. A ridge which descends from the Deep Freeze Range to Campbell Glacier between Rainey Glacier and Recoil Glacier. Mapped by USGS from surveys and United States Navy air photos, 1960-64. Named by US-ACAN for Lieutenant John L. Archambault, United States Navy, medical officer at McMurdo Station, 1967.

=== Miller Nunatak ===
74°26′S 164°15′E. A sharp pointed nunatak rising above the ice at the lower end of Campbell Glacier, 5 nautical miles (9.3 km; 5.8 mi) ESE of Mount Dickason. Mapped by USGS from surveys and United States Navy air photos, 1955-63. Named by US-ACAN for Herman T. Miller, biologist at McMurdo Station, 1965-66 season.

=== Campbell Glacier Tongue ===
74°36′S 164°24′E. The seaward extension of Campbell Glacier into northern Terra Nova Bay. The name was suggested by US-ACAN in association with Campbell Glacier.

=== Shield Nunatak ===
74°33′S 164°30′E. A prominent nunatak standing at the east side of the terminus of Campbell Glacier on the north shore of Terra Nova Bay. This feature, a multiple volcanic cone, was so named by the NZGSAE, 1965-66, because it looks like an old Viking shield.

== Sources ==
- Alberts, Fred G., ed. (1995), Geographic Names of the Antarctic (PDF) (2 ed.), United States Board on Geographic Names This article incorporates public domain material from websites or documents of the United States Board on Geographic Names.
- Mount Melbourne.jpg, USGS: United States Geological Survey
- Mount Murchison, USGS: United States Geological Survey

This article incorporates public domain material from websites or documents of the United States Geological Survey.
