= Priestley Glacier =

Glacier in Antarctica

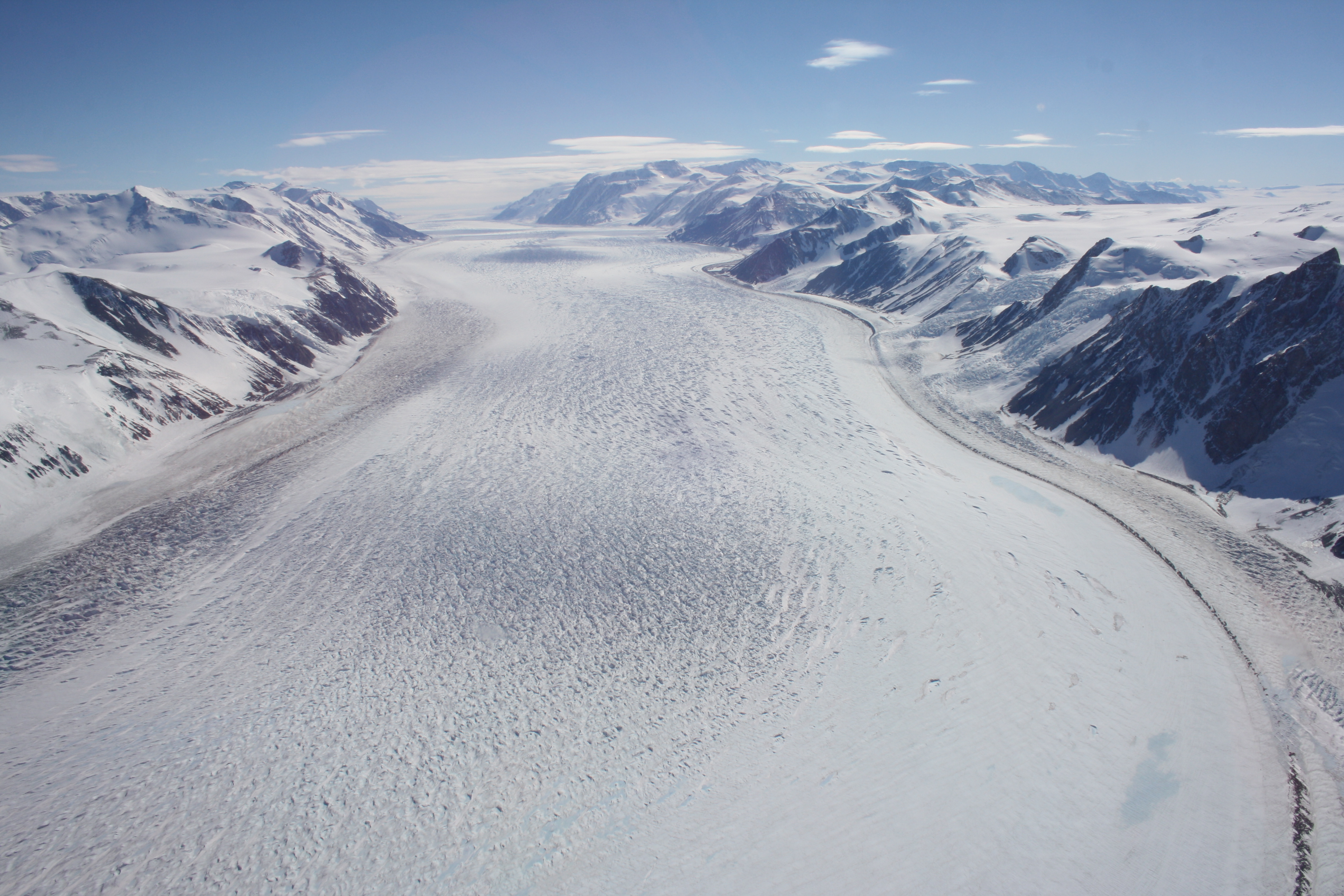
- Priestley Glacier in 2018

- Location within Antarctica
- Location: Victoria Land
- Coordinates: 74°20′S 163°22′E
- Terminus: Nansen Ice Sheet

The Priestley Glacier (74°20′S 163°22′E) is a major valley glacier, about 60 nautical miles (110 km; 69 mi) long, originating at the edge of the Polar Plateau of Victoria Land, Antarctica. The glacier drains southeast between the Deep Freeze Range and Eisenhower Range to enter the northern end of the Nansen Ice Sheet. It was first explored by the Northern Party of the British Antarctic Expedition, 1910–13, and named for Raymond Priestley, a geologist with the Northern Party.

== Geography ==
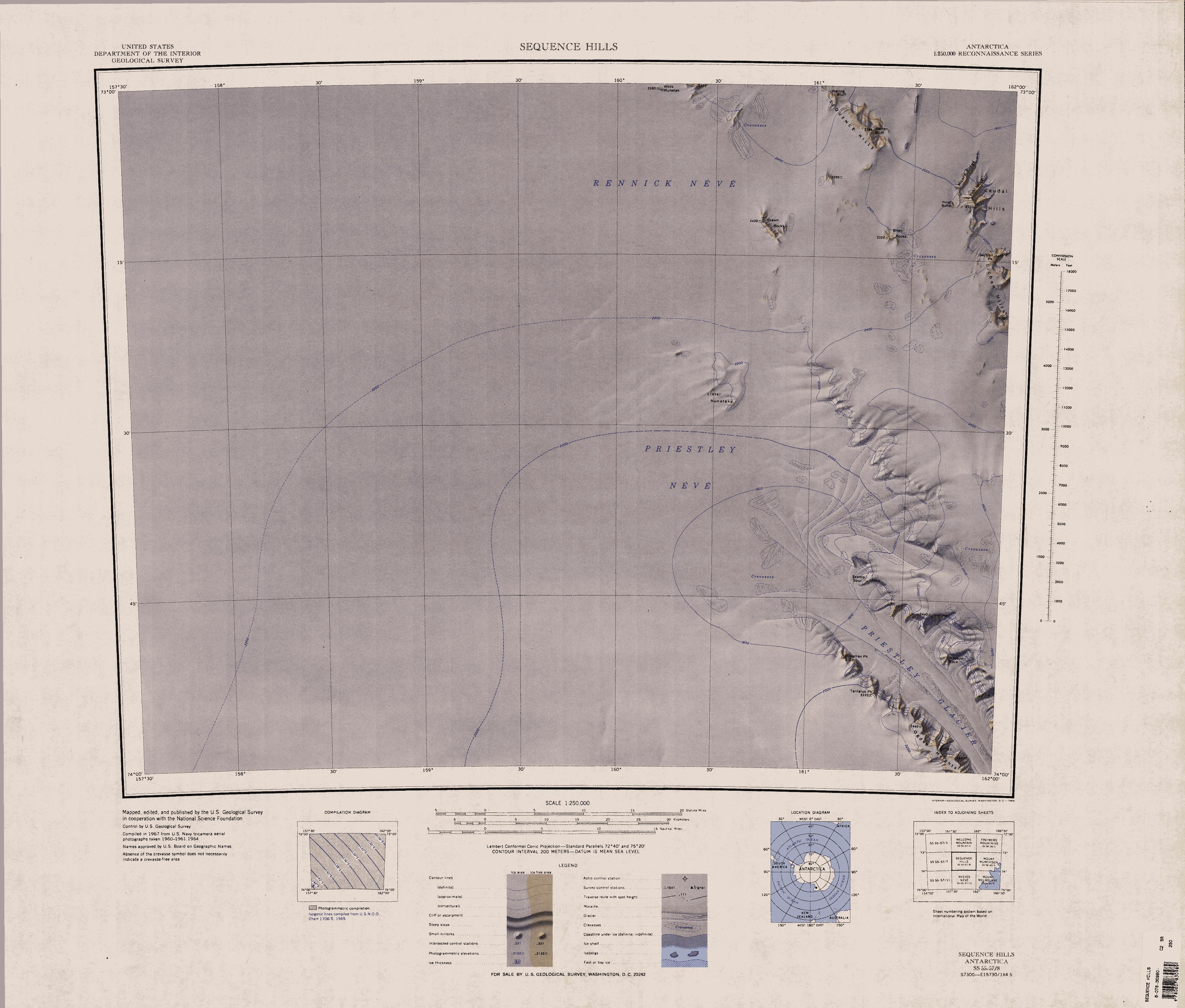
Upper part of Priestley Glacier flowing to southeast corner

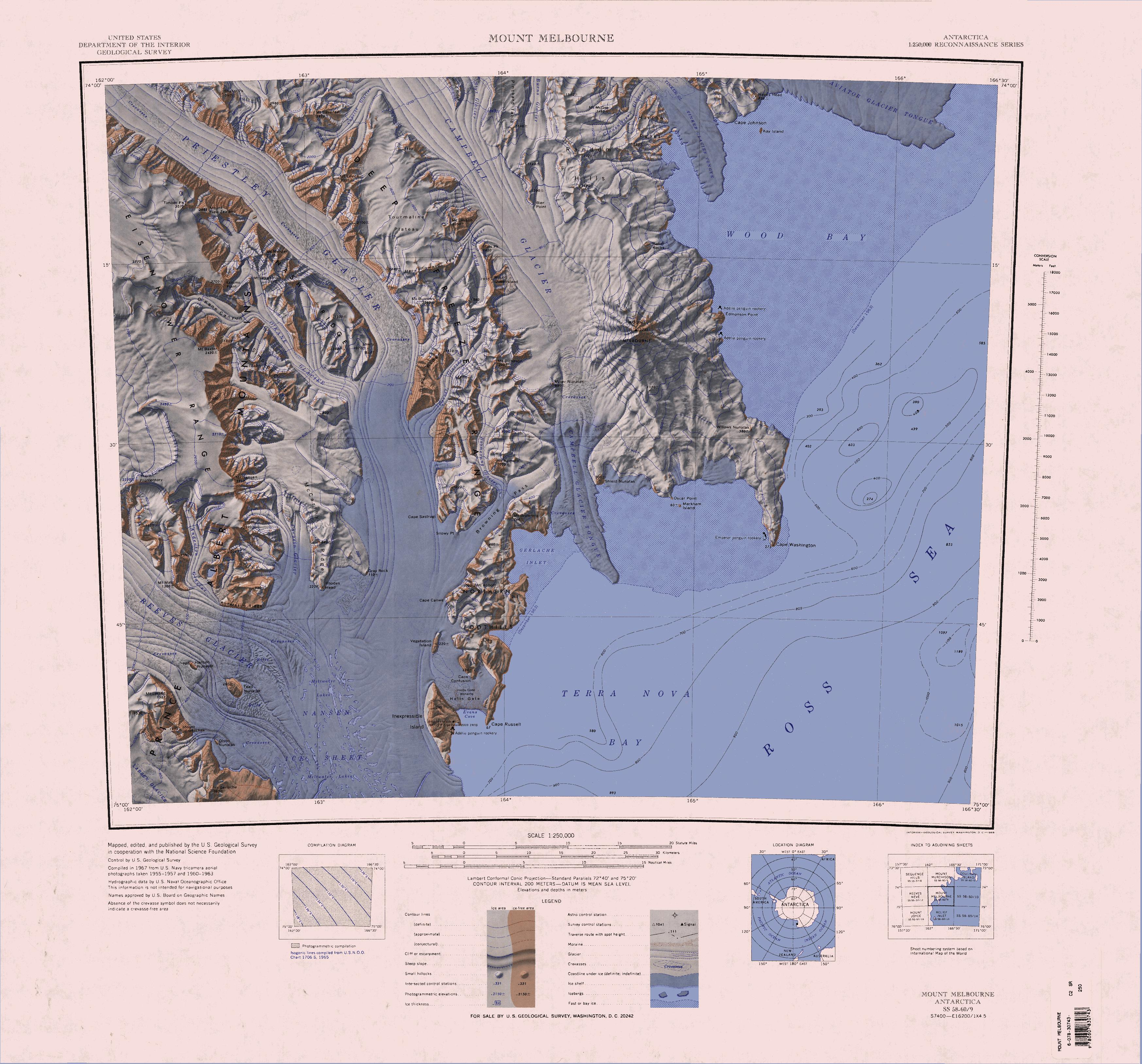
Lower part of Priestley Glacier flowing from northwest corner

The Priestly Glacier is fed by the Priestly Névé, which lies to the east of the polar plateau, south of the Lister Nunataks, Brawn Rocks and Rennick Névé. It runs southeast between the Szanto Spur and Wasson Rock to the northeast and Clingman Peak, Tantalus Peak and the Ogden Heights to the southwest. Foolsmate Glacier joins it from the southwest. It continues southeast between the Eisenhower Range to the southwest and the Deep Freeze Range to the northeast. The Nash Ridge forms part of its southwest flank. South of this it is fed by O'Kane Glacier from the northwest, which in turn receives ice from O'Kane Canyon. South of Black Ridge on its eastern flank, as it merges into the Nansen Ice Sheet, it is fed by the Corner Glacier.

== Tributaries ==
=== Foolsmate Glacier ===
74°01′S 161°55′E. A small, heavily crevassed tributary glacier flowing northeast to enter Priestley Glacier, 11 nautical miles (20 km; 13 mi) west of Shafer Peak. The name was applied by the Southern Party of the NZGSAE, 1962-63.

=== O'Kane Glacier ===
74°26′S 163°06′E. A steep glacier, 15 nautical miles (28 km; 17 mi) long, draining the east wall of Eisenhower Range between Mount Baxter and Eskimo Point and flowing southeast to its terminus opposite the mouths of the Priestley and Corner Glaciers at the north extremity of Nansen Ice Sheet. Named by US-ACAN in association with O'Kane Canyon, located at the head of the glacier.

=== O'Kane Canyon ===
74°19′S 162°30′E. A steep-walled canyon at the head of O'Kane Glacier, indenting the east side of Eisenhower Range between Mount Baxter and Eskimo Point. Named by the Southern Party of NZGSAE, 1962–63, for H.D. O'Kane, photographer at Scott Base, 1961-62. O'Kane had made several reconnaissance flights to provide aerial photographs of the area.

=== Corner Glacier ===
74°27′S 163°40′E. A steep glacier descending Deep Freeze Range between Black Ridge and Mount Dickason to merge with the confluent ice of Nansen Ice Sheet. First explored by the Northern Party of the British Antarctic Expedition (BrAE), 1910-13, and so named by them because of its location with respect to the Nansen Ice Sheet.

== Other features ==
=== Priestley Névé ===
73°35′S 160°20′E. The névé at the head of Priestley Glacier. Named by the New Zealand Antarctic Place-Names Committee (NZ-APC) in about 1966 in association with Priestley Glacier.

=== Lister Nunataks ===
73°27′S 160°32′E. Isolated nunataks located in the north reaches of Priestley Névé, about 15 nautical miles (28 km; 17 mi) south-southwest of Brawn Rocks. Mapped by the United States Geological Survey (USGS) from surveys and United States Navy air photos, 1960-64. Named by the United States Advisory Committee on Antarctic Names (US-ACAN) for Larry W. Lister, helicopter flight crewman with United States Navy Squadron VX-6 during Operation Deep Freeze 1966, 1967 and 1968.

=== Brawn Rocks ===
73°12′S 160°45′E. Prominent isolated rocks extending over 3 nautical miles (5.6 km; 3.5 mi) long, lying 12 nautical miles (22 km; 14 mi) southwest of Sequence Hills. Mapped by USGS from surveys and United States Navy air photos, 1960-64. Named by US-ACAN for James E. Brawn, aviation machinist's mate with United States Navy Squadron VX-6 at McMurdo Station, 1966.

=== Szanto Spur ===
73°43′S 161°18′E. A noteworthy rock spur jutting from the north wall into Priestley Glacier, at the head of the glacier. Mapped by USGS from surveys and United States Navy air photos, 1960-64. Named by US-ACAN for Otto R. Szanto, United States Navy, radio man who served in Antarctic support activities for four seasons at McMurdo Station in the 1960s.

=== Wasson Rock ===
73°50′S 161°45′E. A prominent, mainly ice-free rock situated along the north wall near the head of Priestley Glacier. Mapped by USGS from surveys and United States Navy air photos, 1960-64. Named by US-ACAN for William G. Wasson, aviation electrician's mate with United States Navy Squadron VX-6 at McMurdo Station, 1966.

=== Clingman Peak ===
73°50′S 161°12′E. The final peak, 2,150 metres (7,050 ft) high, along the south wall at the head of Priestley Glacier. Mapped by USGS from surveys and United States Navy air photos, 1960-64. Named by US-ACAN for Otis Clingman, Jr., biologist at McMurdo Station, 1965-66.

=== Tantalus Peak ===
73°53′S 161°21′E. The highest peak, 2,220 metres (7,280 ft) high, along the south wall at the head of Priestley Glacier. So named by the southern party of New Zealand Geological Survey Antarctic Expedition (NZGSAE), 1962–63, because an attempt to establish a station there proved abortive due to steep ice. (Tantalus, son of Zeus, was punished for transgressions by "standing in water that ebbed when he would drink.")

=== Ogden Heights ===
73°58′S 161°40′E. Flattish, mainly ice-covered heights, about 7 nautical miles (13 km; 8.1 mi) long, forming a part of the south wall of upper Priestley Glacier to the southeast of Tantalus Peak. The heights are near where the southern party of the NZGSAE, 1962–63, was landed. Named by them for Lieutenant John H. Ogden, United States Navy, pilot who airlifted the party to this point, flew in their resupply, and later flew the party back to base at the end of the season.

=== Simpson Crags ===
74°24′S 162°45′E. A series of rugged crags descending southeast from Mount Baxter of the Eisenhower Range and forming the south wall of O'Kane Glacier. Mapped by USGS from surveys and United States Navy air photos, 1955-63. Named by US-ACAN for Lieutenant Commander William A. Simpson, Jr., United States Navy, aircraft commander with Squadron VX-6 during USN Operation Deep Freeze 1967.

== Sources ==
- Alberts, Fred G., ed. (1995), Geographic Names of the Antarctic (PDF) (2 ed.), United States Board on Geographic Names This article incorporates public domain material from websites or documents of the United States Board on Geographic Names.
- Mount Melbourne.jpg, USGS: United States Geological Survey
- Reeves Névé, USGS: United States Geological Survey
- Sequence Hills, USGS: United States Geological Survey

This article incorporates public domain material from websites or documents of the United States Geological Survey.
