= Mount Baxter (Antarctica) =

Mountain in Ross Dependency, Antarctica

- Location within Antarctica

Highest point
- Elevation: 2,430 m (7,970 ft)
- Coordinates: 74°22′S 162°32′E

Geography
- Location: Victoria Land, Antarctica
- Parent range: Eisenhower Range

Mount Baxter is a large buttress-type mountain, located just south of O'Kane Canyon where it forms a rounded projection of the east escarpment of the Eisenhower Range, in Victoria Land, Antarctica.

Discovered by the British National Antarctic Expedition (1901–04) under Scott, who named it for Sir George and Lady Baxter of Dundee, supporters of the expedition.
