= Terra Nova Bay =

Bay in Antarctica

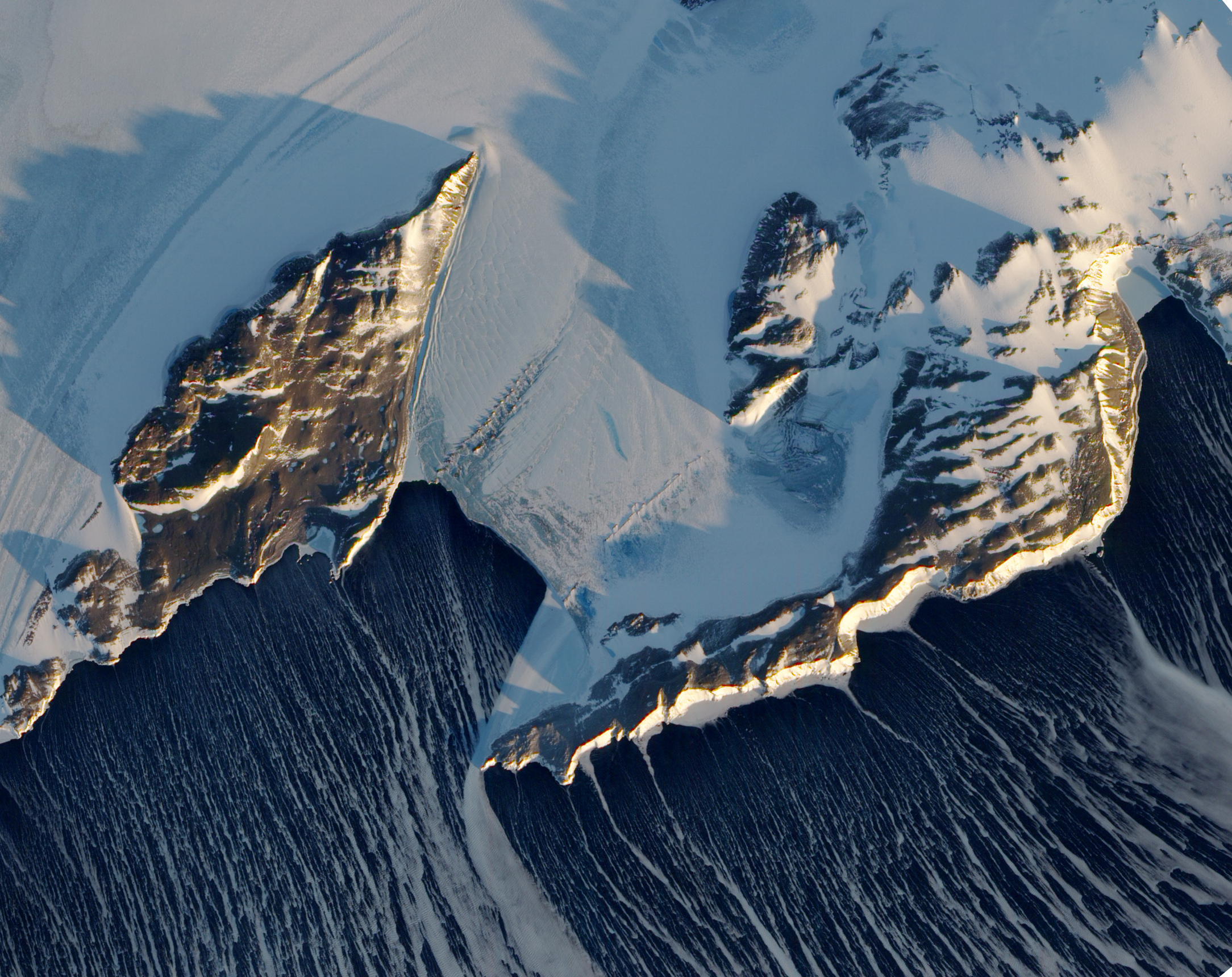
- Satellite image of Terra Nova Bay at bottom (south), with Inexpressible Island to the left (west)

- Location within Antarctica
- Location: Victoria Land
- Coordinates: 74°50′0″S 164°30′0″E

Terra Nova Bay (74°50′0″S 164°30′0″E) is a bay of the Ross Sea which is often ice free, about 40 nautical miles (74 km; 46 mi) long, lying between Cape Washington and the Drygalski Ice Tongue along the coast of Victoria Land, Antarctica. It was discovered by the British National Antarctic Expedition (known as the Discovery Expedition) under Robert Falcon Scott, 1901–1904, and named by him after Terra Nova, one of the relief ships for the expedition.

The Italian permanent Zucchelli Station is located in the bay, as is the Jang Bogo Station of South Korea. The Chinese Qinling Station on Inexpressible Island, opened in 2024, is their fifth station in Antarctica.

== Geography ==
The Terra Nova Bay is delimited to the north by Cape Washington. To the west of that cape is Oscar Point, facing Markham Island, and Shield Nunatak at the mouth of the Campbell Glacier, which extends its tongue southward into the bay. East of that the Northern Foothills extend south into the bay to the west of Gerlache Inlet. At the south of the foothills are Evans Cove, south of Hells Gate and the Hells Gate Moraine, between Cape Russell to the east and Inexpressible Island to the west. The Priestley Glacier flows to the east of the Northern Foothills into the Nansen Ice Sheet. The Larsen Glacier enters the bay to the south of the Nansen Ice Sheet, flowing towards Relief Inlet, which defines the south of the bay, north of the Drygalski Ice Tongue.

The ice shelves and glaciers around Terra Nova Bay play an important role in the dynamics of Terra Nova Bay. During the winter, the bay is often sea ice free; it acts as a coastal polynya due to the katabatic winds that blow off the David, Reeves and Priestley glaciers and Nansen Ice shelf, making this an important region for sea ice formation and high salinity shelf water.

== Climate ==
The climate in Terra Nova Bay is mostly dominated by the katabatic winds that blow off the David, Reeves and Priestly glaciers and Nansen Ice shelf. Temperatures recorded by weather stations around Zucchelli Station, the Italian base, are between +2 and −20 °C (36 and −4 °F) in January and between −20 and −30 °C (−4 and −22 °F) in the winter months. Relative humidity is around 50% all year round, but due to the cold temperatures, the amount of water vapor is very low. Wind is a dominant factor in the climate of Terra Nova Bay, it experiences katabatic winds from the west, barrier winds from the south and eastern flows. The katabatic winds are particularly strong in Terra Nova Bay and originate from the SW if from the Priestly glacier and NW if from the Reeves glacier, forming a polynya event. In summer 30% of the winds are katabatic and 50% in winter and are often paired with Lee waves and clear skies. The cyclone of the Ross Sea pushes air off the Ross shelf northward along the mountain range on Victoria land, causing relative humid southern winds along the coast.

== Antarctic Specially Protected Area ==
A marine area of 29.4 km^{2} (11.4 sq mi) of the bay comprising a narrow strip of coastal waters about 9.4 km (5.8 mi) long, to the immediate south of Zucchelli Station, and extending to a maximum of 7 km (4.3 mi) from the shore, has been designated an Antarctic Specially Protected Area (ASPA 161). It is an important site for long-term research on the marine ecology of benthic communities. As well as rich and complex sponge and anthozoan communities, the site supports a colony of Adélie penguins at Adélie Cove.

== Features ==
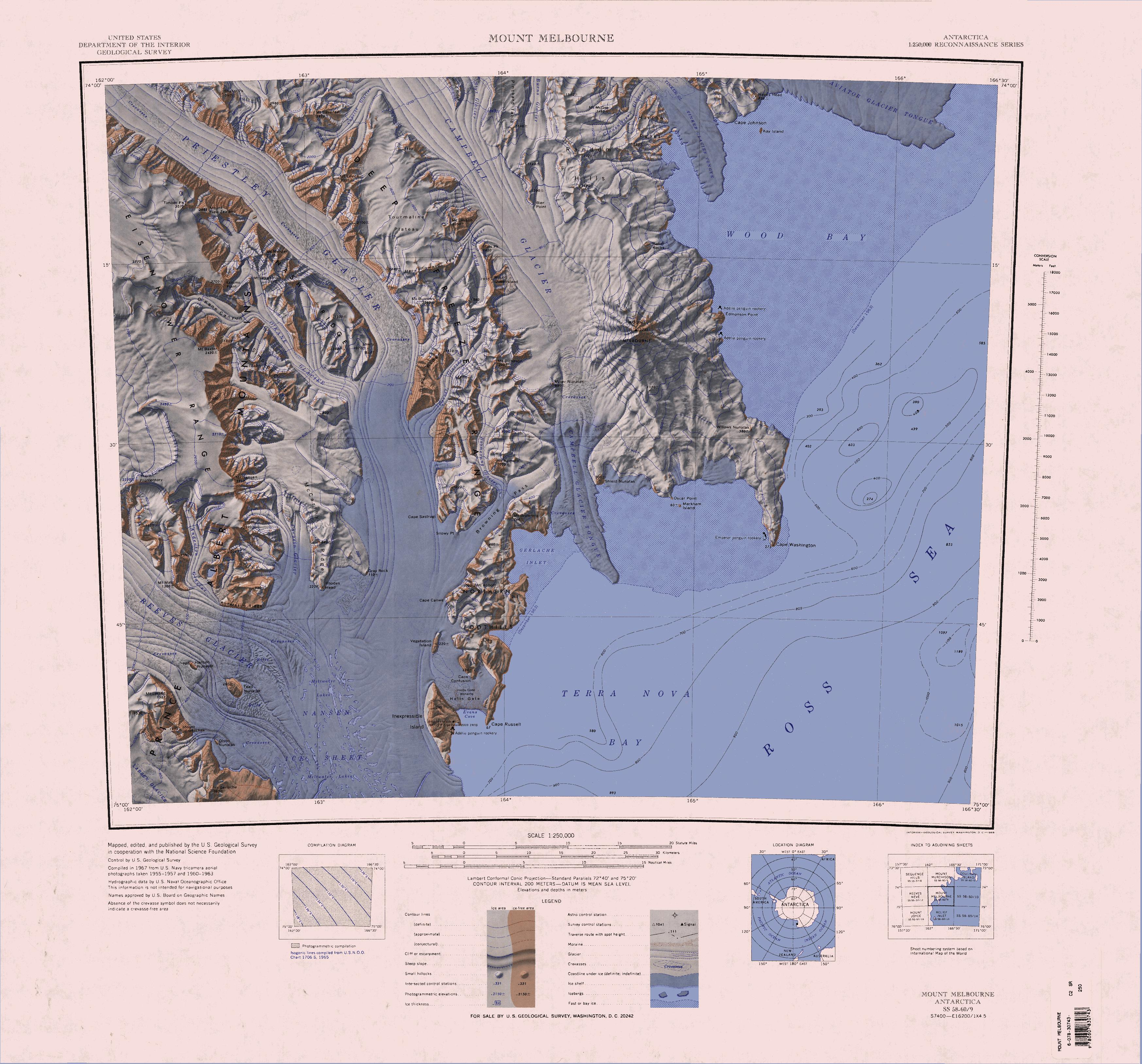
Terra Nova Bay in south center of map. Nansen Ice Shelf is darker blue area to the southeast

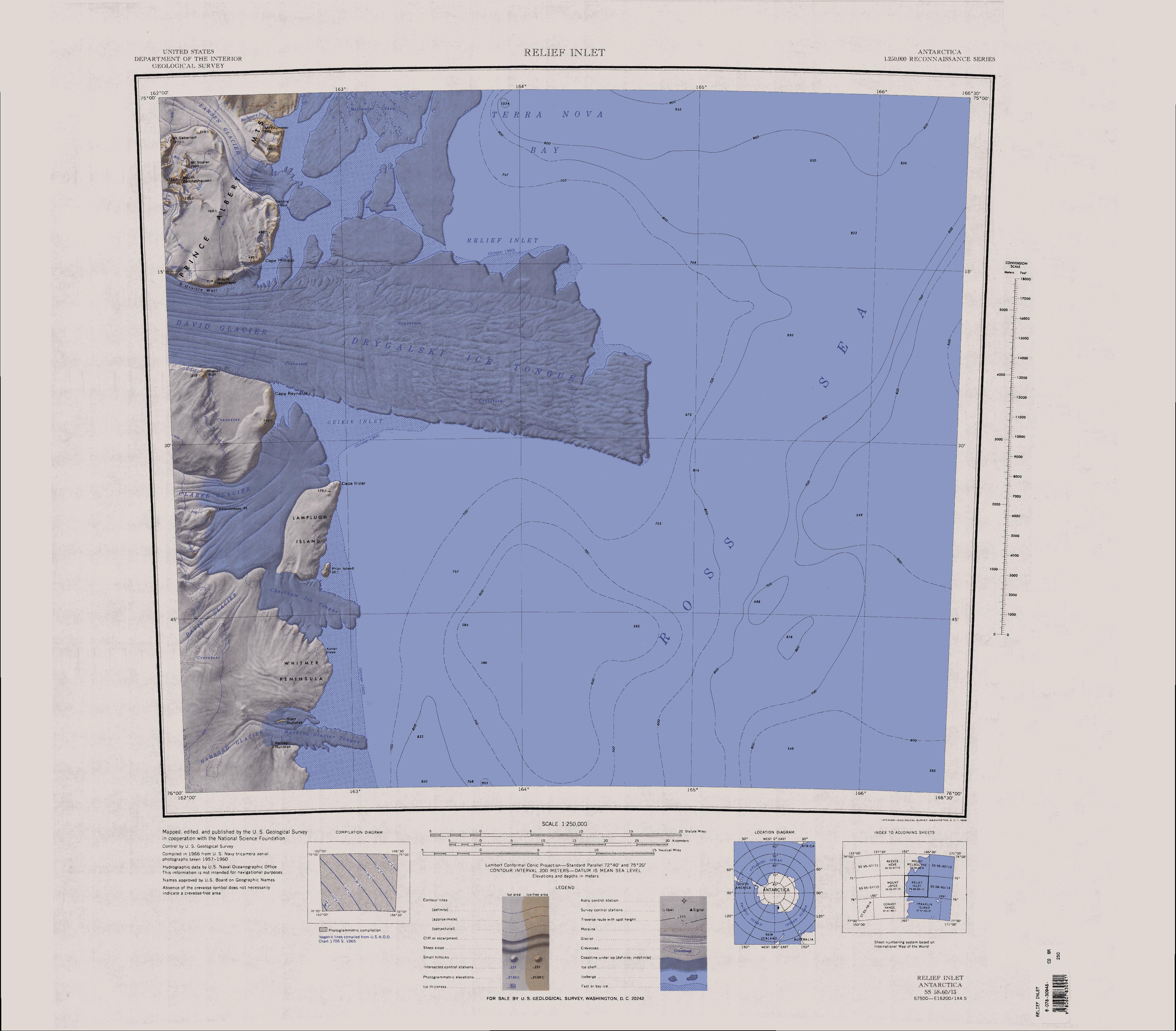
Terra Nova Bay in north center of map. Nansen Ice Shelf is darker blue area to the northeast

Named features of the bay, from north to south, include:

=== Cape Washington ===
74°39′S 165°25′E. A prominent cape, 275 metres (902 ft) high, marking the south extremity of the peninsula which separates Wood Bay and Terra Nova Bay. Discovered in 1841 by Captain James Clark Ross, Royal Navy, and named by him for Captain John Washington, Royal Navy, who was secretary of the Royal Geographical Society, 1836–40.

=== Oscar Point ===
74°35′S 164°53′E. A small rock point along the north shore of Terra Nova Bay, 1 nautical mile (1.9 km; 1.2 mi) northwest of Markham Island. Discovered by the British Antarctic Expedition (BrAE) 1898–1900, and named for King Oscar of Norway and Sweden. Carsten Borchgrevink, the leader of this expedition, was a native of Norway. Originally charted by Borchgrevink as an island, the feature is now known to be joined to the coast.

=== Markham Island ===
74°36′S 164°55′E. A small but conspicuous island lying just off Oscar Point in the north part of Terra Nova Bay. Discovered in February 1900 by the BrAE (1898–1900) under C.E. Borchgrevink, who named it for Sir Clements Markham.

=== Shield Nunatak ===
74°33′S 164°30′E. A prominent nunatak standing at the east side of the terminus of Campbell Glacier on the north shore of Terra Nova Bay. This feature, a multiple volcanic cone, was so named by the New Zealand Geological Survey Antarctic Expedition (NZGSAE), 1965–66, because it looks like an old Viking shield.

=== Gerlache Inlet ===
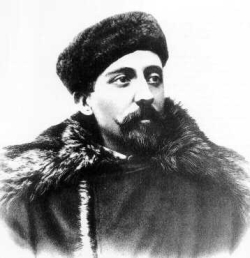
Adrien de Gerlache

74°41′S 164°06′E. An inlet 4 nautical miles (7.4 km; 4.6 mi) wide in the northwest corner of Terra Nova Bay, indenting the Northern Foothills just south of Mount Browning. The name appears to have been applied by the BrNAE, 1901–04, and honors Belgian Antarctic explorer Lieutenant Adrien de Gerlache.

=== Evans Cove ===
74°53′S 163°48′E. A cove in Terra Nova Bay, entered between Inexpressible Island and Cape Russell. First charted by the BrAE, 1907–09. Probably named by Shackleton for Captain P.P. Evans, master of the ship Koonya, which towed the Nimrod south in 1907, and later master of the Nimrod during the last year of the expedition.

=== Inexpressible Island ===
74°54′S 163°39′E. An island, 7 nautical miles (13 km; 8.1 mi) long, in Terra Nova Bay, lying close south of the Northern Foothills at the outer edge of the Nansen Ice Sheet. First explored by the Northern Party of the BrAE, 1910–13, and called "Southern Foothills" in contradistinction to the Northern Foothills. The name was changed to Inexpressible Island by the party after spending a very unpleasant winter on half rations in a cave in a snowdrift on the island.

=== Relief Inlet ===
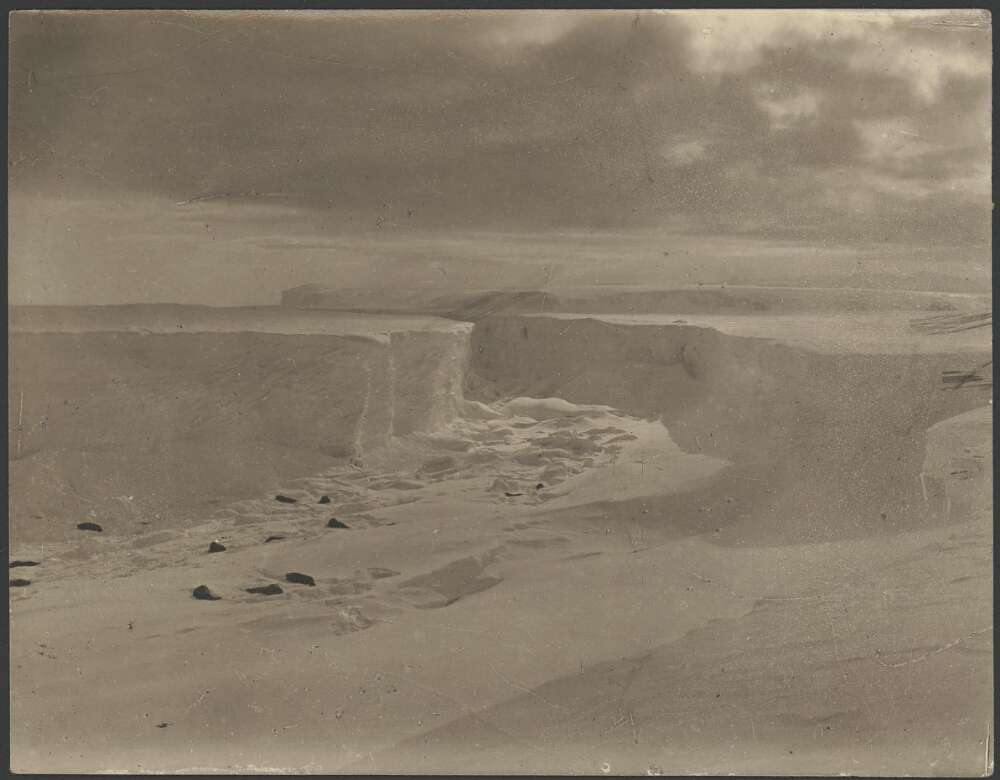
Relief Inlet 1909

75°13′S 163°45′E. A narrow inlet at the southwest corner of Terra Nova Bay. The feature is formed along a shear plane caused by differential ice movement near the coast of Victoria Land involving the north edge of Drygalski Ice Tongue and south extremities of the Nansen Ice Sheet. So named by the South Magnetic Polar Party, led by T.W.E. David, of the BrAE, 1907–09, because, after almost giving up hope of rescue, the Nimrod picked up the party here.

== Sources ==
- Alberts, Fred G., ed. (1995), Geographic Names of the Antarctic (PDF) (2 ed.), United States Board on Geographic Names This article incorporates public domain material from websites or documents of the United States Board on Geographic Names.
- Colacino, M.; Piervitali, E.; Grigioni, P. (2000), "Climatic Characterization of the Terra Nova Bay Region", in Faranda, Francesco Maria; Guglielmo, Letterio; Ianora, Adrianna (eds.), Ross Sea Ecology: Italiantartide Expeditions (1987–1995), Berlin, Heidelberg: Springer, pp. 15–26, doi:10.1007/978-3-642-59607-0_2, ISBN 978-3-642-59607-0
- Frezzotti, Massimo (1993), "Glaciological study in Terra Nova Bay, Antarctica, inferred from remote sensing analysis", Annals of Glaciology, 17: 63–71, doi:10.3189/S0260305500012623, ISSN 0260-3055
- "Terra Nova Bay, Ross Sea" (PDF), Management Plan for Antarctic Specially Protected Area No. 161: Measure 14, Annex, Antarctic Treaty Secretariat, 2008
- Mount Melbourne.jpg, USGS: United States Geological Survey
- Relief Inlet.jpg, USGS: United States Geological Survey
- Sravasti Dasgupta (19 April 2023), "China resumes construction on fifth Antarctica base, shows new satellite imagery", Independent
- "Terra Nova Bay Polynya, Antarctica", earthobservatory.nasa.gov, 2007-10-18

This article incorporates public domain material from websites or documents of the United States Geological Survey.
