= Victoria Land =

Region of Eastern Antarctica

- Region
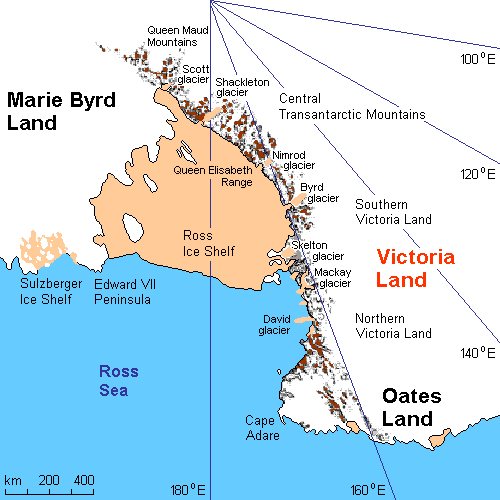
- Area map of Victoria Land
- Etymology: Queen Victoria
- Interactive map of Victoria Land
- Coordinates: 71°15′S 163°00′E
- Continent: Antarctica
- Established: 1841
- Founder: James Clark Ross

Victoria Land is a region in eastern Antarctica which fronts the western side of the Ross Sea and the Ross Ice Shelf, extending southward from about 70°30'S to 78°00'S, and westward from the Ross Sea to the edge of the Antarctic Plateau. It was discovered by Captain James Clark Ross in January 1841 and named after Queen Victoria. The rocky promontory of Minna Bluff is often regarded as the southernmost point of Victoria Land, and separates the Scott Coast to the north from the Hillary Coast of the Ross Dependency to the south.

== History ==
Early explorers of Victoria Land include James Clark Ross and Douglas Mawson.

In 1979, scientists discovered a group of 309 meteorites in Antarctica, some of which were found near the Allan Hills in Victoria Land. The meteorites appeared to have undergone little change since they were formed at what scientists believe was the birth of the Solar System.

In 1981, lichens found at Victoria Land attracted the attention of NASA because lichens may give clues about where to look for the existence of extraterrestrial life. Dr. George Denton, a glaciologist at the University of New Hampshire, looked for microorganisms on Mount Lister, one of the highest in Antarctica; it has the same kind of sandstone in which lichens grow.

In 2017, conservationists at Cape Adare, Victoria Land, unearthed an ice-covered fruitcake that they believe once belonged to the British explorer Robert Falcon Scott. Scott's Northern Party expedition was in 1911, making the age of the fruitcake 106 years old. A program manager said it was in "excellent condition."

== Geography ==
The region includes ranges of the Transantarctic Mountains and the McMurdo Dry Valleys (the highest point being Mount Abbott in the Northern Foothills), and the flatlands known as the Labyrinth. The 2,700-metre (9,000 ft) Mount Melbourne is an active volcano in Victoria Land.
