= Kirriereoch Loch =

Kirriereoch loch
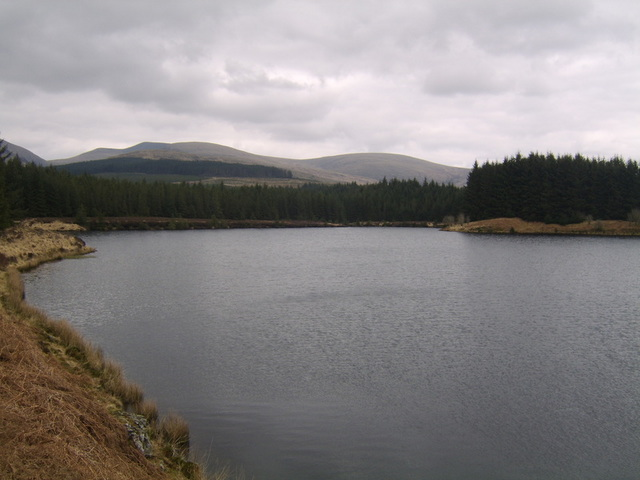

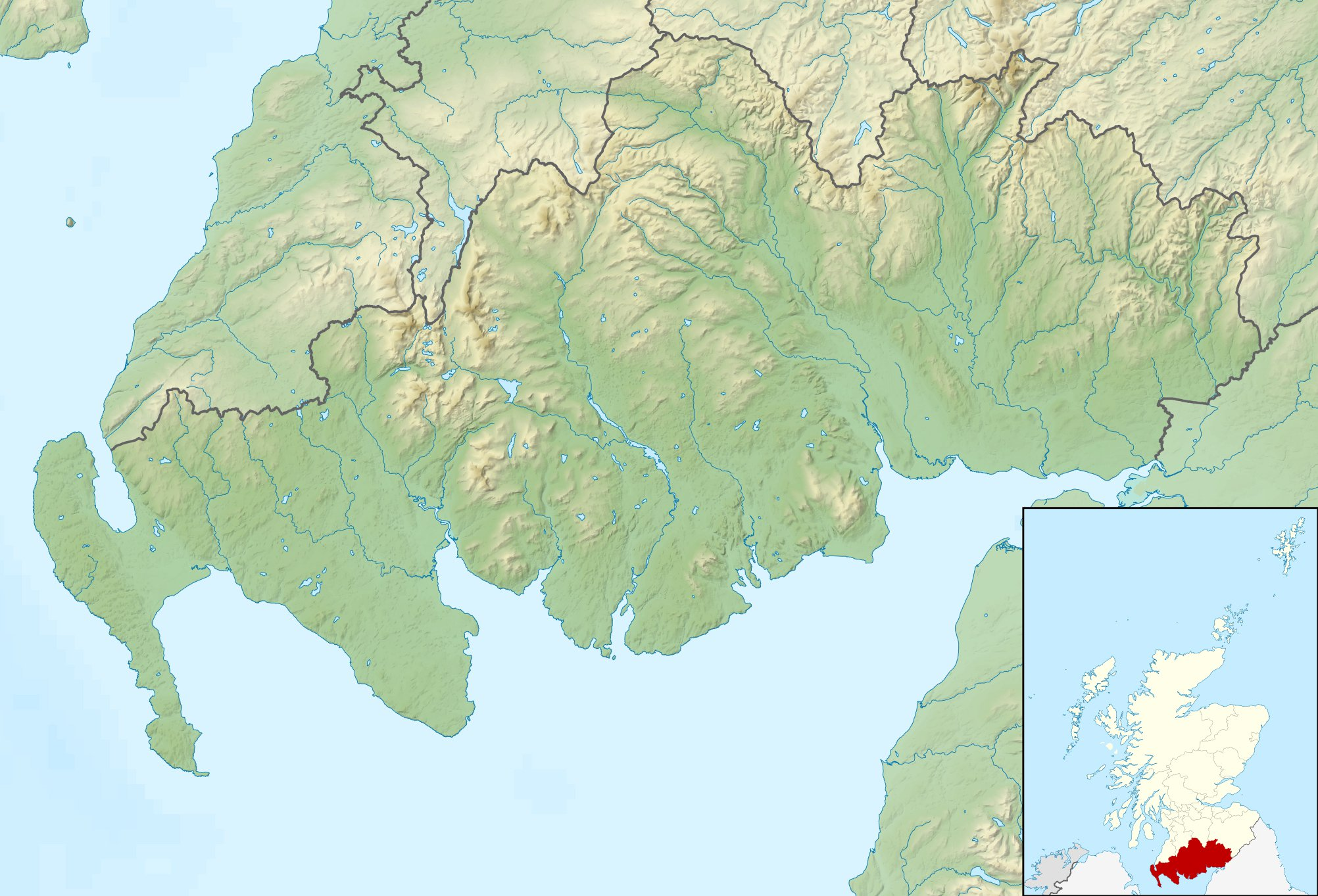
- Location within Dumfries and Galloway
- Location: Dumfries and Galloway, Scotland
- Coordinates: 55°08′48″N 4°34′04″W
- Type: freshwater loch
- Primary outflows: Kirriemore burn
- Basin countries: Scotland
- Max. length: 0.25 mi (0.40 km)
- Max. width: 0.2 mi (0.32 km)
- Surface area: 6.9 ha (17 acres)
- Average depth: 7 ft (2.1 m)
- Max. depth: 15 ft (4.6 m)
- Water volume: 5,000,000 ft^{3} (140,000 m^{3})
- Shore length^{1}: 1.2 km (0.75 mi)
- Surface elevation: 212 m (696 ft)
- Islands: 0
- ^{1} Shore length is not a well-defined measure.

Kirriereoch Loch is a small, shallow, square shaped, freshwater loch in Dumfries and Galloway, in the Southern Uplands of south-west Scotland. It lies approximately 12 mi (19 km) north of the town of Newton Stewart. It is a part of the Wood of Cree Nature Preserve system

The loch is stocked with brown trout with wild brown trout also being present. The Newton Stewart Angling Association manage fishing on the loch.

== Survey ==
The loch was surveyed in 1903 by James Murray and later charted as part of Sir John Murray's Bathymetrical Survey of Fresh-Water Lochs of Scotland 1897-1909.
