= Aurora Australis (book) =

Book printed on Antarctica during the Nimrod Expedition

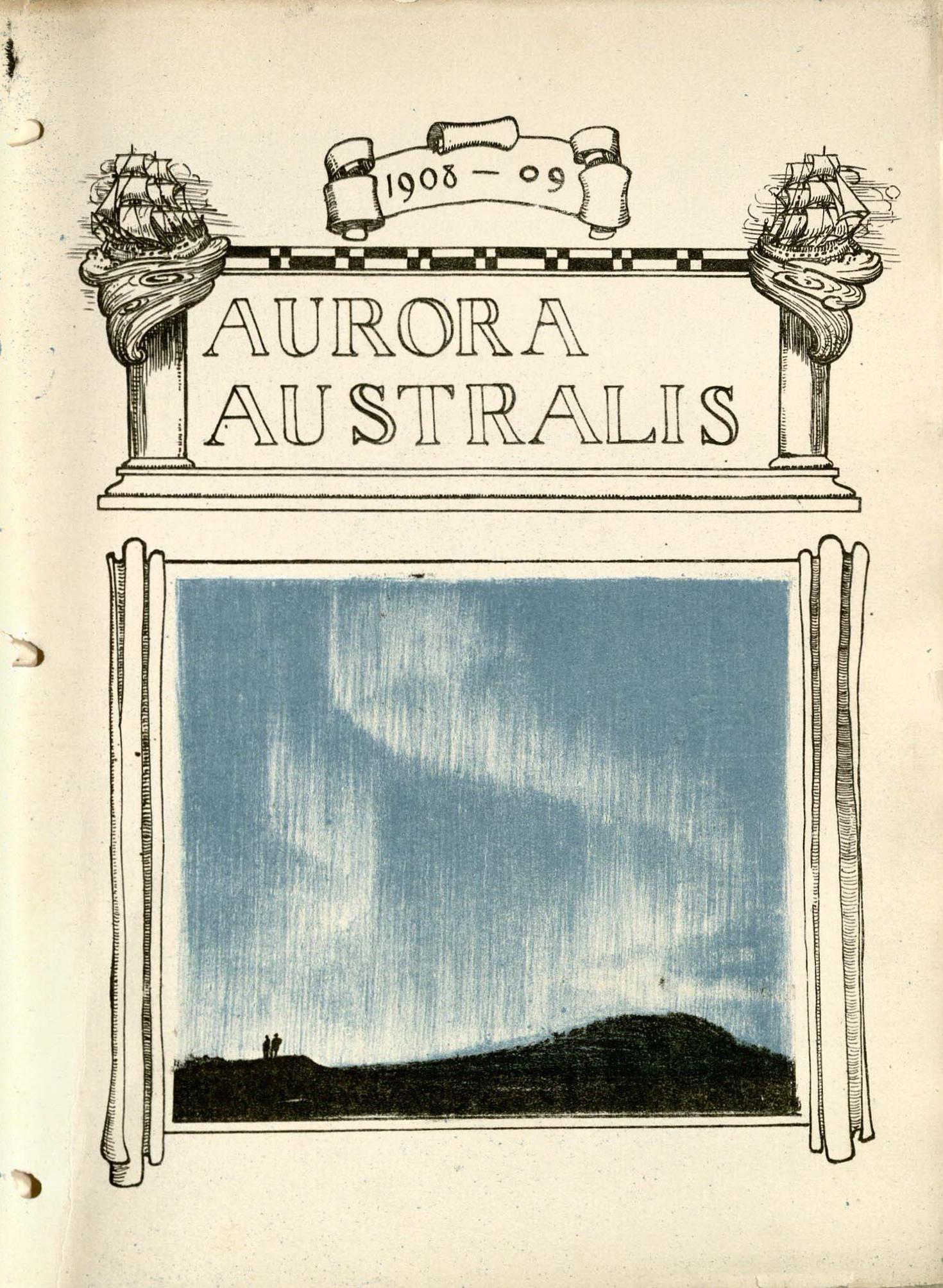
Aurora Australis title page

Aurora Australis is a book comprising stories and poems written by the members of the Nimrod Expedition to Antarctica led by Ernest Shackleton from 1908 until 1909. It was also illustrated, printed, and bound on location at their polar base, the first book to have been so produced in the Antarctic. Apart from Shackleton, other contributors to the book included geologist T. W. Edgeworth David, artist George Marston, biologist James Murray, and geologist Douglas Mawson.

== Bibliographic details ==
Aurora Australis was written during the British Antarctic Expedition, also known as the Nimrod Expedition led by Ernest Shackleton from 1908 until 1909. Produced entirely by members of the expedition, the book was edited by Shackleton, illustrated with lithographs and etchings by George Marston, printed by Ernest Joyce and Frank Wild using a J. Causton & Sons printing press, and bound by Bernard Day. The production of Aurora Australis was one of the cultural activities Shackleton encouraged while the expedition team over-wintered at Cape Royds on Ross Island in the McMurdo Sound, to ensure that "the spectre known as 'polar ennui' never made its appearance". According to Shackleton, it was the "first book ever written, printed, illustrated and bound in the Antarctic".

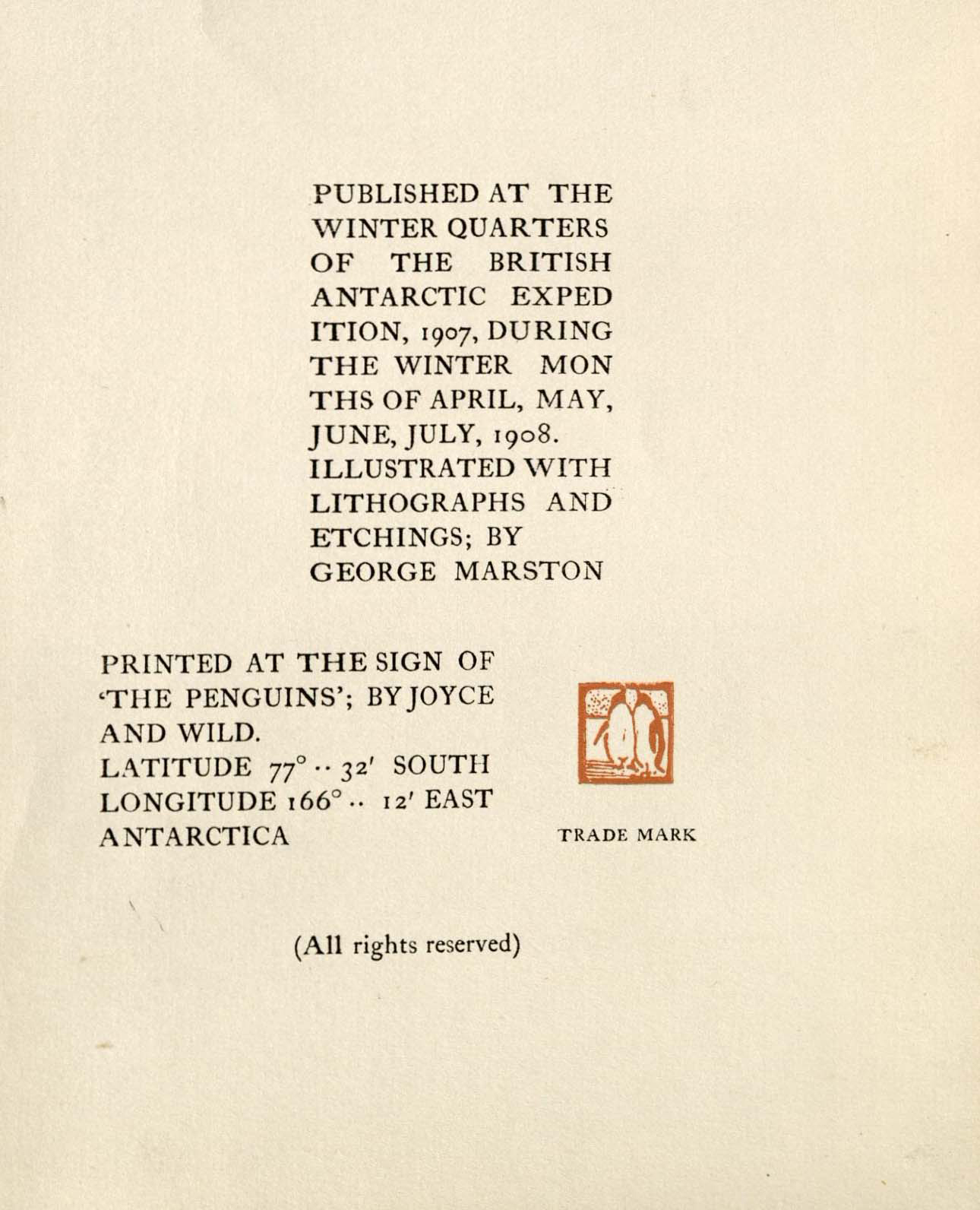
The copyright notice from Aurora Australis notes its origins.

In the additional preface, Shackleton writes, "Since writing the preface for this book I have again looked over its pages, and though I can see but little not up to usual standard in bookmaking, the printers are not satisfied that it is everything that it ought to be. But the reader will understand better the difficulty of such a book quite up to the mark when he is told that, owing to the low temperature in the hut, the only way to keep the printing ink in a fit state to use was to have a candle burning under the inking plate; and so, if some pages are printed more lightly than others it is due to the difficulty of regulating the heat, and consequently the thinning or thickening of the ink."

Because the copies of Aurora Australis were unnumbered, it is unclear exactly how many were produced; it is believed that one hundred copies were created, of which less than seventy have been accounted for. Copies of the book are often identified by the original stencils on the inside of the covers, which were made of boards from wooden supply boxes. Shackleton may have originally intended to sell copies of the book on his return from the Antarctic, but instead they were all distributed among the members of the expedition and given to other "friends and benefactors of the expedition".

== Sections ==
The book is divided into ten sections, each a story or poem written by members of the crew. Illustrations are shown throughout. The sections are as follows:

- The Ascent of Mount Erubus — T. W. Edgeworth David. An account of the first summiting of Mount Erebus by David and other members of the expedition.
- Midwinter Night — "Nemo" (Shackleton). A short, comedic poem detailing what a night watchman might observe while everyone else sleeps. It describes dogs snarling over a bone outside and the sleepers inside having terrible or sometimes amorous dreams.
- Trials of a Messman — A Messman. A humorous account of being the messman for the expedition at Cape Royds. An anonymous member of the expedition team explaining how little attention or respect he paid to the duties of a messman before it became his job. He describes mealtimes and his duties surrounding them in detail, concluding that cooks deserve more respect than they generally receive and that the various scientists should be appreciated for volunteering to sweep the tent and take that duty off the messman's hands.
- A Pony Watch — "Putty (George Marston). A present-tense account of a two-hour duty watch in the Pony Stables on Nimrod in harsh seas.
- Southward Bound — "Lapsus Linguæ". A poem about the journey to Antarctica aboard Nimrod.

When the sun returns from his tropical home,
And smiles on these desolate quarters,
May the ice hold fast till sledging is past,
Then 'What Ho'! for our wives and daughters.

- An Interview with an Emperor — "A. F. M." (Alistair Mackay). A short story about a man speaking to an emperor penguin which informs him that he is intruding on a country estate and demands identification. The penguin speaks with a strong Scottish accent and accuses the narrator of stealing one of its eggs (as Scott's party had previously done), though the only thing in his pocket is a flask which he offers to the penguin. The penguin reluctantly agrees to let him go, and the narrator wakes, unsure whether it was a dream after all.
- Erebus — "Nemo" (Shackleton). A short, admiring poem on Mount Erebus and the landscape around it.
- An Ancient Manuscript — Shellback/Wand Erer (Frank Wild). A tale in the style of The Story of King Arthur and His Knights by Howard Pyle, recounting Shackleton's mythic rise to becoming expedition leader and mixing contemporary and archaic language for comedic effect.

"And so it came to pass that Shackleton, having got together his ship and men to work on the ship, and his steward to gather stores of food and raiment, did look around for men tried and trusted whom he might take with him to dwell in that distant land of snow and darkness.
"First did he choose one who was skilled in the arts of reading signs and portents in the clouds and in the stars, and of steering his way on land or on the water by means of a wondrous piece of metal marked with divers figures.
"Then he took one who had studied at the seats of learning and had knowledge of all kinds of sickness, and who could join together bones which were broken asunder.
"And because that they had been in the ship Discovery, and knew of the land and the people and the beasts that dwelt therein, he did take two from the ships of the Great King."

- Life under Difficulties — James Murray. Concerns Rotifers and how they are able to survive in the cold of Antarctica.
- Bathybia — Douglas Mawson. A speculative short story which appears at first to be another memoir-like account of Antarctica, but which actually explores an expedition into a fictional world called Bathybia, a hot jungle with red foliage and terrifying spider-like creatures which attack the men, besides giant tardigrades with an anaesthetic bite. This, too, is revealed at the end to be a dream.
