= Loch Dornal =

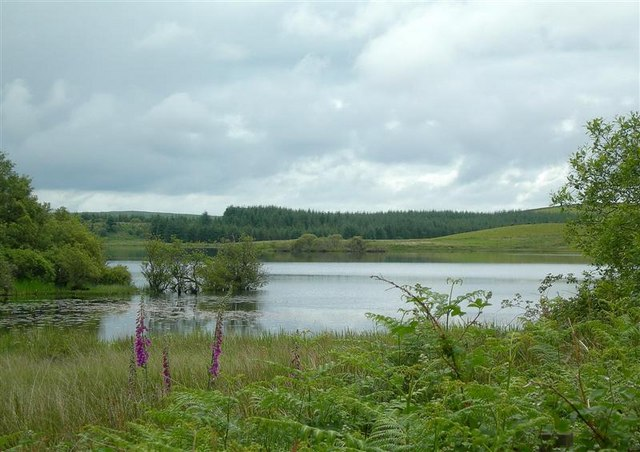

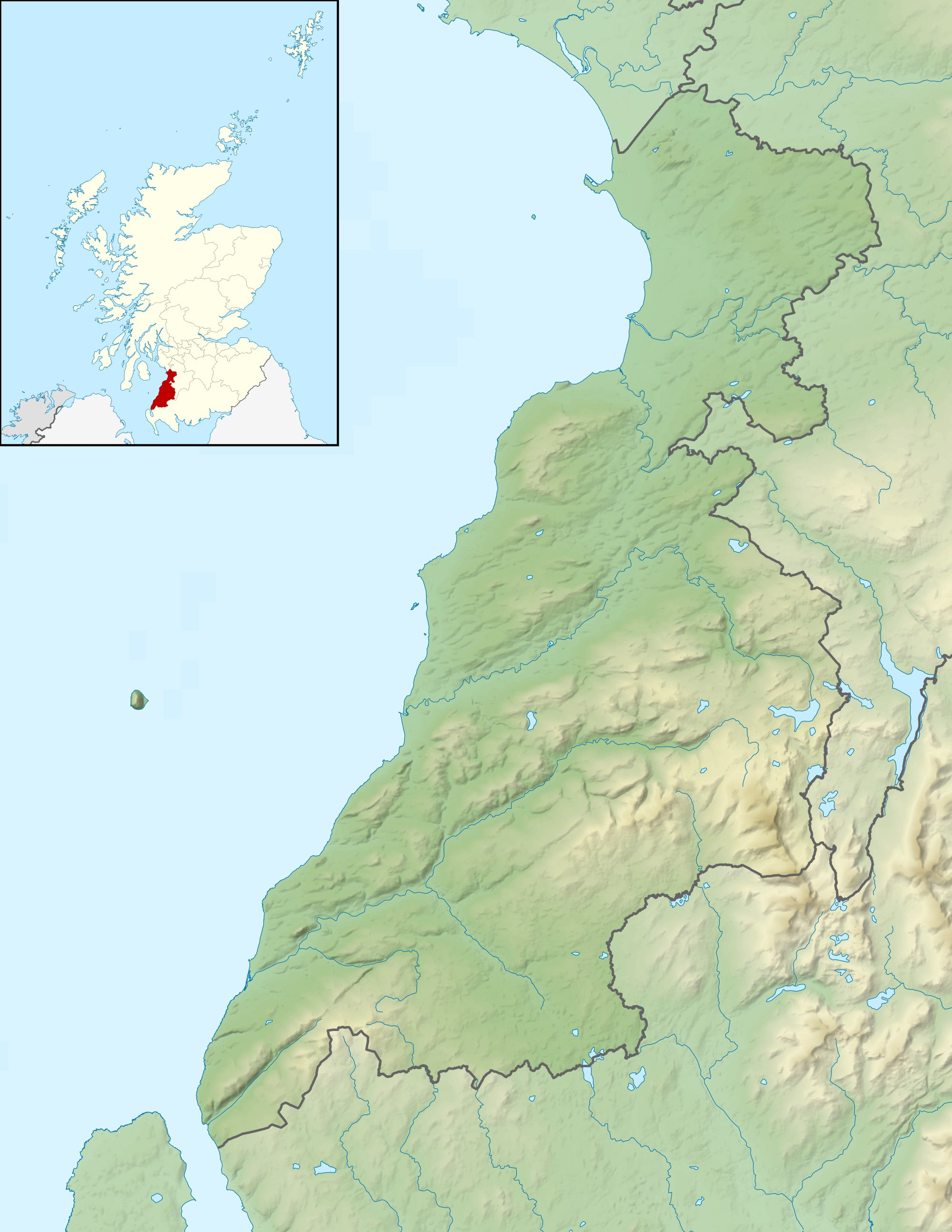
- Location within South Ayrshire
- Location: Strathclyde, Scotland
- Coordinates: 55°03′02″N 4°40′29″W
- Type: freshwater loch
- Primary inflows: Corwar burn
- Primary outflows: Carrick burn
- Basin countries: Scotland
- Max. length: 0.66 mi (1.06 km)
- Max. width: 0.33 mi (0.53 km)
- Surface area: 43.8 ha (108 acres)
- Average depth: 5 ft (1.5 m)
- Max. depth: 10 ft (3.0 m)
- Water volume: 26,000,000 ft^{3} (740,000 m^{3})
- Shore length^{1}: 4.9 km (3.0 mi)
- Surface elevation: 118 m (387 ft)
- Islands: several islets
- ^{1} Shore length is not a well-defined measure.

Loch Dornal is an irregular shaped, shallow, freshwater loch in south Ayrshire, in the Southern Uplands of Scotland. It lies approximately eight miles (thirteen kilometres) northwest of the town of Newton Stewart.

There are several islets in the loch some of which contain archaeological features.

The loch is stocked with rainbow trout and fishing is permitted with permission from Drumlamford Estate.

== Survey ==
The loch was surveyed in 1903 by James Murray and later charted as part of Sir John Murray's Bathymetrical Survey of Fresh-Water Lochs of Scotland 1897-1909.
