= Aurora Australis (disambiguation) =

The aurora australis is the southern counterpart of the aurora borealis.

Aurora Australis may also refer to:

- Aurora Australis (book), a book written, printed, illustrated, and bound in the Antarctic
- Aurora Australis (icebreaker), an Australian ship
- "Aurora Australis", a song by the 3rd and the Mortal from the album Painting on Glass
