= Bertram Armytage =

Australian soldier and polar explorer (1869–1910)

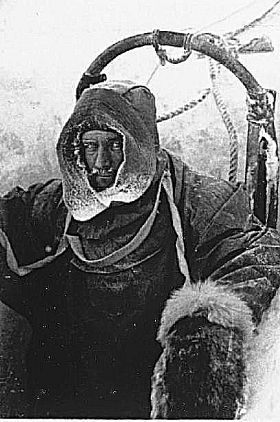
- Armytage emerging from an exploratory shaft dug into one of Cape Royds' frozen lakes.
- Born: 29 September 1869; Lara, Colony of Victoria, British Empire (now Victoria, Australia)
- Died: 12 March 1910 (aged 40); Melbourne, Victoria, Australia
- Burial place: Boroondara General Cemetery, Victoria, Australia
- Occupations: Antarctic explorer, soldier, grazier
- Awards: Queen's Medal with three clasps; King's Medal with two clasps; Polar Medal

Military service
- Branch: Victorian Militia; British Army
- Service years: 1890-1898,1900–1902
- Rank: Second Lieutenant
- Unit: 6th Dragoon Guards
- War/Expedition: Second Boer War; Nimrod expedition

Bertram Armytage (29 September 1869 – 12 March 1910) was an Australian soldier and explorer. He fought in the Second Boer War and participated in the Nimrod Expedition to Antarctica during the Heroic Age of Antarctic Exploration, for which he was awarded the Polar Medal.

== Early life ==
Armytage was born in Lara in 1869, the son of pastoralist Frederick William Armytage and Mary Susan Armitage. He grew up at Wooloomanata Station near Lara, before being educated at Geelong Grammar School and Melbourne Church of England Grammar School. A keen sportsman, he paddled a canoe from Melbourne to Geelong, before carrying it to the Barwon River, then rowing along the Barwon to Port Phillip Bay and back to Melbourne. He would later travel to England, where he attended Jesus College, Cambridge. He rowed for the college, earning first place in the Lent Races of 1888. After college he returned to Australia, where he worked on his father's station, as well as a station in Queensland.

== Military career ==
While in Victoria, he joined the Victorian Militia serving in the artillery, before travelling back to England, where he joined the 6th Dragoon Guards as a second lieutenant. In 1899, his unit was sent to South Africa to fight in the Second Boer War. He earned the Queen's South Africa Medal for his efforts, before resigning his commission at the end of the war, returning to Australia.

== Post war ==
After his time in South Africa, he spent his time between Australia and England as well as taking part in sporting pursuits. An excellent shot, he was on a deer hunting trip to New Zealand when he heard about the Nimrod Expedition, cutting the trip short to offer his services.

== Antarctic exploration ==
His physical attributes and hunting skills helped Ernest Shackleton overlook his age, being 38 at the time and one of the older members of the trip, selecting him to look after the ponies on the expedition. While he didn't undertake the more notable sections of the expedition, he contributed heavily through depot stocking trips and as a member of the support party for the South Pole party. On one occasion he managed to escape a Killer Whale attack while mustering the ponies on pack ice.

== Death ==
After his return from the expedition, he travelled to England, hoping to obtain a military position to give himself a permanent occupation. Despite the assistance of Major General Sir Edward Hutton, he was deemed too old. He would return to Australia disappointed at this rejection.

On 12 March 1910, he would take his own life in his room at the Melbourne Club. He was found wearing medals presented to him by the Royal Geographical Society for his work in the Antarctic, while his Polar and Boer War Medals were on display on his dresser.

== Personal life ==
Armytage was married and had a four-year-old daughter at the time of his death.

== Honours and Memorials ==
His mother established a scholarship at the University of Melbourne in his honour. Mount Armytage in Antarctica was named for him by members of the Nimrod Expedition. His medals are held by the National Trust of Victoria.

== Sources ==
- Alberts, Fred G., ed. (1995), Geographic Names of the Antarctic (PDF) (2 ed.), United States Board on Geographic Names This article incorporates public domain material from websites or documents of the United States Board on Geographic Names.
