= George Marston (artist) =

British polar explorer and artist (1882–1940)

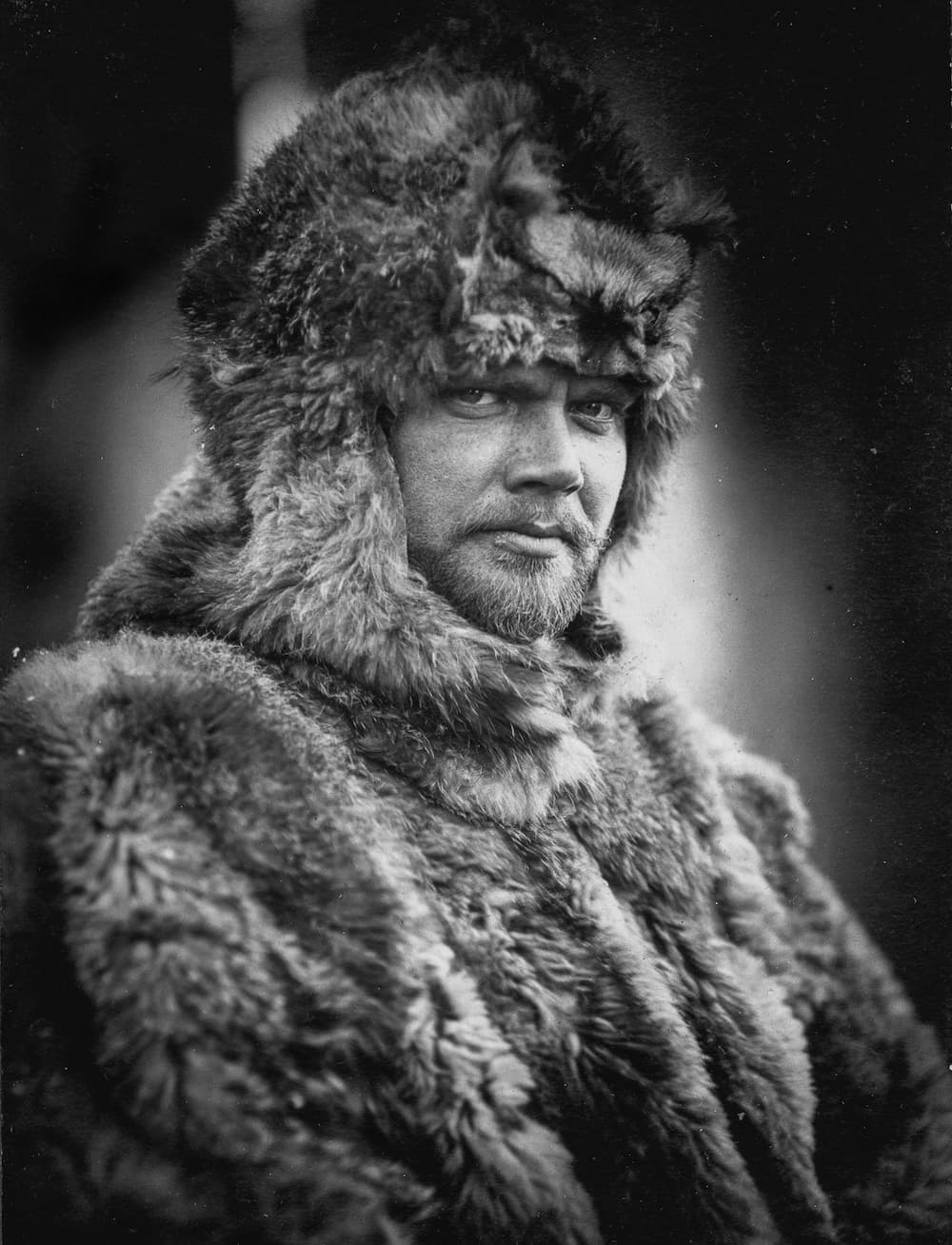
- Born: George Edward Marston; 19 March 1882; Southsea, Hampshire, England
- Died: 22 November 1940 (aged 58); Taunton, Somerset, England
- Occupations: Explorer, artist
- Spouse: Hazel Roberts (m. 1913–1940)
- Children: 2
- Family: Dr Harry Roberts, father-in-law

George Edward Marston (19 March 1882 – 22 November 1940) was an English artist who twice accompanied Sir Ernest Shackleton on expeditions to Antarctic, first from 1907 to 1909 on the Nimrod expedition, and then later from 1914 to 1917 on the Imperial Trans-Antarctic Expedition, which ended with the crew being marooned on Elephant Island.

== Early life ==
Marston was born in Southsea (Portsmouth, England). He studied art at Regent Street Polytechnic (now the University of Westminster).

== Nimrod expedition ==
Marston was friends with two of Shackleton's sisters, and it was them that encouraged Marston to apply to join their brother's expedition to Antarctica aboard the Nimrod. During the Nimrod expedition, George helped to print the book Aurora Australis whilst stationed on Antarctica during the winter, contributing sketching and lithographs.

== Imperial Trans-Antarctic expedition ==
Marston was one of the first members to sign up for the Imperial Trans-Antarctic Expedition, and one of the few to have worked alongside Shackleton before. Marston tended to be somewhat of a procrastinator when needed for necessary duties during the expedition, though he was liked for the most part by the crew. He often yearned for his wife and children back home, which caused him to be rather moody. Because of these things, over the course of the journey Shackleton grew to dislike Marston. While marooned on Elephant Island, some of Marston's oil paints were used to caulk the boat used by Shackleton to reach South Georgia. Marston also helped to design the tents for use on the ice floe the crew camped on once the Endurance sank.

Some watercolours and oil paintings by Marston of the expedition (many painted on return from sketches) are held at the Scott Polar Research Institute.

== Burial ==
Marston is buried in the cemetery of St Bartholomew's at East Lyng, Somerset, England.
