= Harry Roberts (doctor) =

English doctor, author and philanthropist

- Born: 1871; Bishop's Lydeard, Somerset, England
- Died: 13 November 1946 (aged 74–75); Hawkley, Hampshire, England
- Other name: "Saint of the East End" "Sixpenny Doctor"
- Education: University College, Bristol; St Mary's Hospital Medical School
- Occupations: Doctor, philanthropist, author
- Spouse: Jessie Groves (m. 1891) Winifred Stamp
- Children: 2
- Family: George Marston (son-in-law)

Harry Roberts (1871 – 13 November 1946) was an English doctor, author and philanthropist. He created a prototype health clinic, "the largest slum practice in the East End", and was an instigator of the 'panel scheme', part of the National Insurance Act 1911, which preceded the establishment of the National Health Service. He was a prolific author, with over 25 books covering a wide variety of subjects, including gardening, politics, fish and euthanasia. He was involved in the Socialist labour movement in the 1920s and was a prominent early member of the Fabian Society.

== Personal life ==
Roberts was born in 1871 in Bishop's Lydeard, Somerset to Leonard Roberts and Jane Elizabeth Roberts, née Skinner. Despite his being male, he attended Miss Edney's Academy for Young Ladies, Queen's College, Taunton, between 1882 and 1886, University College, Bristol and St Mary's Hospital Medical School.

He married Jessie Groves in 1891. They had two children. Their daughter Hazel married George Marston, an artist who had accompanied Ernest Shackleton on 1915 expedition to the Antarctic.

Roberts bought some woodland near Petersfield, where he built his home, Oakshott Hanger. The development included huts where patients from his Stepney clinic could come to recuperate from illnesses such as tuberculosis. Roberts was friends with the author H. G. Wells, fellow Fabian George Bernard Shaw and the journalist, Kingsley Martin, who would regularly visit him in Petersfield.

Later in life he lived with Winifred Stamp, who published Doctor Himself: An Unorthodox Biography of Harry Roberts following Roberts' death at Oakshott Hanger in 1946.

== Medical career ==
Roberts' first medical practice was in Hayle, Cornwall where he worked for ten years. He moved to Aldgate, London in 1904 and then to Mile End, Stepney in 1906, where he remained for thirty years. In 1909, Neil A Lyons wrote Sixpenny Pieces (Pub. John Lane), a series of pen-portraits of Roberts, his staff and patients.

After the National Insurance Act of 1911, Roberts' clinic became hugely popular, with many people keen to join his panel. He eventually claimed to have Great Britain's largest insurance practice with over 6,000 patients, four doctors, two midwifes, a secretary and several dispensers.

In November 1940 he made a public call to "make inoculation compulsory", saying that, "to prevent an epidemic this winter we must keep the shelters clean, spray the air, provide shelter wards, medically examine all users, inoculate wardens first – then all others." His Stepney clinic was bombed in 1941, after which he took semi-retirement in Petersfield.

== Politics ==
Around 1909, Roberts founded the Stepney Labour League, an early version of an "individual members' section", which, according to Clement Attlee in 1954 was "in its way an anticipation of the present local Labour Party".

Roberts offered the use his Mile End clinic for Independent Labour Party meetings. He was a vocal supporter of the suffrage movement and once stood for parliament, but "decided he really couldn't bear the Labour party".

He was a long-serving member of the Mile End Board of Guardians, an ad hoc authority which administered poor relief.

== Publications ==
Roberts wrote books on a wide variety of topics, including medicine, politics, gardens, tramps, poets and labour policy:

- Public Control of Hospitals (1895) Pub. William Reeves
- The Chronicle of a Cornish Garden (1901) Pub. John Lane
- The Books of Old-Fashioned Flowers and Other Plants which thrive in the Open-Air of England (1901) Pub. John Lane
- Tramp's Handbook: For the use of travellers, soldiers, cyclists, and lovers of the country (1903)
- The Sayings of Jesus: Collected and arranged by Harry Roberts (1903) Pub. Gay & Bird
- The Vagabond's Library (1904) Pub. Anthony Treherne and Co
- The Practitioner's Handbook (1905) Pub. John Lane
- The Book of Rarer Vegetables (1906) Pub. John Lane, co-written with George Wythes
- The Philosophy of Long Life (1909) Pub. John Lane
- The Mother's Advice Book (1911) Pub. Ward, Lock and Co.
- Towards a National Policy (1911) Pub. J Murray
- The Beginners Book of Gardening (1911)
- Constructive Conservatism (1913)
- The Simplification of Life (1915) Pub. G Allen and Unwin, Co-written with Edward Carpenter
- All About Gardening (1915) Pub. Ward
- The Newfoundland Fish Boxes: A Chronicle of the Fishery (1918)
- Poultry Book: A Guide for Small or Big Poultry Keepers, Beginners and Farmers (c. 1920) Pub. Ward, Lock and Co
- England: A National Policy for Labour (1920) with an introduction by J. R. Clynes Pub. Horsnell and Roberts
- The Book of a Cottage Garden (c. 1920s) Co-written with Charles Thonger
- Everyman in Health and in Sickness (1935) Pub. J M Dent and Sons
- Euthanasia and other aspects of Life and Death (1936) Pub. Constable and Co.
- The Troubled Mind (1938) Pub. John Murray
- The Miracle of the Human Body (1940s) Pub. Odhams
- British Rebels and Reformers (1942) Pub. Collins
- English Gardens (1944) Pub. Collins
- The Philosophy of Jesus (1945) Pub. Religious Book Club, co-written with Lord Horder
- Release from Nervous Tension (1945) Pub. G Allen and Unwin, co-written with David Fink
- The Young Wife's Advice Book (no date) Pub. Ward, Lock and Co
- England: A National Policy for Labour

Roberts contributed to The Englishman's Country magazine (1945) and The Wonderful Story of You: How Your Body Works book series (1945). He also edited two series of books: The Country Handbooks and Handbooks of Practical Gardening, both published by John Lane.

He published articles for The Countryman magazine, Town and Country Planning magazine, and edited for The Times, the Times Literary Supplement, The Spectator, and the New Statesman. He also edited Walt Whitman's Leaves of Grass.

== Petersfield ==
=== Book Shop ===
After failing to locate a "serious book" in Petersfield, Roberts and the artist Flora Twort founded the Petersfield Bookshop at 1 The Square in late 1918, which they ran, together with Hester Wagstaff and Maria Brahms, for the next 28 years.

=== Festival Hall and Town Hall ===
Roberts championed the creation of Petersfield's Festival Hall and Town Hall|, which was opened in 1935. He donated financially and helped to initiate local fundraising efforts. The Hall's primary role was to host the annual Petersfield Musical Festival, which had been established in 1901. After the hall's opening, Roberts became secretary to the Town Hall committee.
