= Nimrod Expedition =

1900s Ernest Shackleton Antarctic expedition

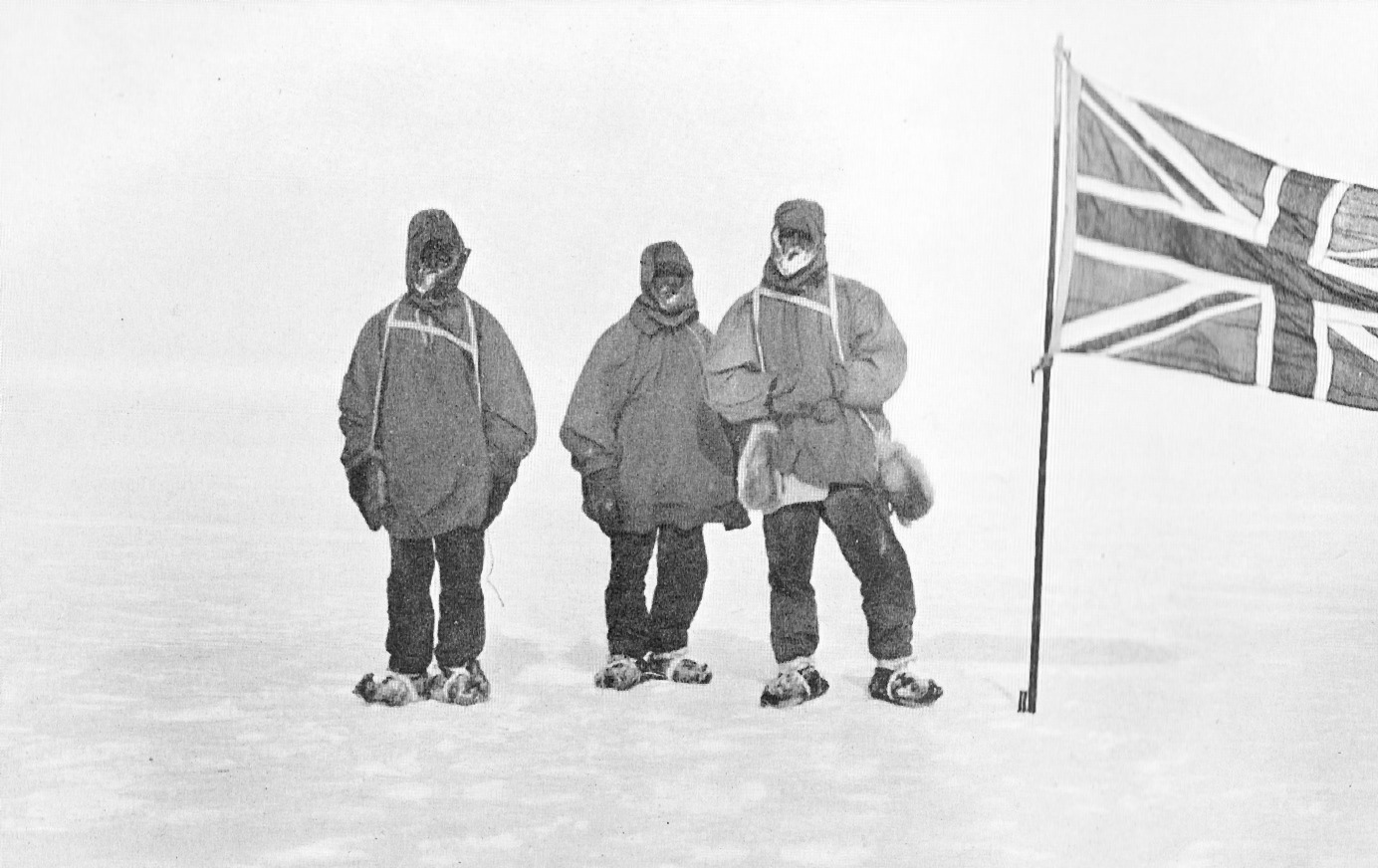
Jameson Adams, Frank Wild and Eric Marshall (from left to right) plant the Union Jack at their southernmost position, 88° 23', on 9 January 1909. The photograph was taken by expedition leader Ernest Shackleton.

The Nimrod Expedition of 1907–1909, otherwise known as the British Antarctic Expedition, was the first of three expeditions to the Antarctic led by Ernest Shackleton and his second time to the continent. Its main target, among a range of geographical and scientific objectives, was to be first to reach the South Pole. This was not attained, but the expedition's southern march reached a Farthest South latitude of 88° 23' S, just 97.5 nautical miles (180.6 km; 112.2 mi) from the pole. This was by far the longest southern polar journey to that date and a record convergence on either Pole. (Note: Most accounts of the expedition give the "97 miles" distance without giving the equivalent in statute miles, the symbolism of being within 100 miles of the pole being considered all-important. See Huntford, p. 269.) A separate group led by Welsh Australian geology professor Edgeworth David reached the estimated location of the South magnetic pole, and the expedition also achieved the first ascent of Mount Erebus, Antarctica's second highest volcano.

The expedition lacked governmental or institutional support, and relied on private loans and individual contributions. It was beset by financial problems and its preparations were hurried. Its ship, Nimrod, was less than half of the size of Robert Falcon Scott's 1901–1904 expedition ship Discovery, and Shackleton's crew lacked relevant experience. Controversy arose from Shackleton's decision to base the expedition in McMurdo Sound, close to Scott's old headquarters, in contravention of a promise to Scott that he would not do so. Nevertheless, although the expedition's profile was initially much lower than that of Scott's six years earlier, its achievements attracted widespread interest and made Shackleton a national hero. The scientific team, which included the future Australasian Antarctic Expedition leader Douglas Mawson, carried out extensive geological, zoological and meteorological work. Shackleton's transport arrangements, based on Manchurian ponies, motor traction, and sled dogs, were innovations which, despite limited success, were later copied by Scott for his ill-fated Terra Nova Expedition.

On his return, Shackleton overcame the Royal Geographical Society's (RGS) initial scepticism about his achievements and received many public honours, including a knighthood from King Edward VII. He made little financial gain from the expedition and eventually depended on a government grant to cover its liabilities. Within three years his southernmost record had been surpassed, as first Amundsen and then Scott reached the South Pole. In his own moment of triumph, Amundsen nevertheless observed: "Sir Ernest Shackleton's name will always be written in the annals of Antarctic exploration in letters of fire".

== Origins ==
Scottish industrialist Sir William Beardmore, later Lord Invernairn

Ernest Shackleton had been a junior officer on Robert Falcon Scott's first Antarctic expedition aboard RRS Discovery. He had been sent home on the relief ship Morning in 1903 after a physical collapse during the expedition's main southern journey. (Note: Shackleton had joined Scott and Edward Wilson on a march south in 1902–1903, to establish a record southern latitude at 82° 17' S. All three had suffered on the return journey from exhaustion and probable incipient scurvy, but Shackleton was the worst affected. See Preston, pp. 65–66.) Scott's verdict was that he "ought not to risk further hardships in his present state of health". Shackleton felt this physical failure as a personal stigma, and on his return to England he was determined to prove himself, in the words of Discovery's second-in command Albert Armitage, as "a better man than Scott". He nevertheless declined the opportunity of a swift Antarctic return as chief officer of Discovery's second relief ship Terra Nova, after helping to fit her out; he also helped to equip Uruguay, the ship being prepared for the relief of Otto Nordenskjöld's expedition, stranded in the Weddell Sea. During the next few years, while nursing intermittent hopes of resuming his Antarctic career, Shackleton pursued other options. In 1906 he was working for the industrial magnate Sir William Beardmore as a public relations officer.

According to his biographer Roland Huntford, the references to Shackleton's physical breakdown made in Scott's The Voyage of the Discovery, published in 1905, reopened the wounds to Shackleton's pride. It became a personal mission that he should return to the Antarctic and outperform Scott. Shackleton began looking for potential backers for an expedition of his own; his initial plans appear in an unpublished document dated early 1906. These include a cost estimate of £17,000 (updated value £2,270,000) for the entire expedition. He received his first promise of financial backing when early in 1907 his employer, Beardmore, offered a £7,000 loan guarantee (updated value £940,000). With this in hand, Shackleton felt confident enough to announce his intentions to the Royal Geographical Society (RGS) on 12 February 1907. One reason for Shackleton's sense of urgency was the knowledge that the Polish explorer Henryk Arctowski was planning an expedition, which was announced at the RGS on the same day as Shackleton's. In the event, Arctowski's plans were stillborn.

== Preparations ==
=== Initial plans ===
Shackleton's original unpublished plan envisaged basing himself at the old Discovery Expedition headquarters in McMurdo Sound. From there he proposed to launch attempts to reach the geographical South Pole and the South magnetic pole. Other journeys would follow, and there would be a continuous programme of scientific work. This early plan also revealed Shackleton's proposed transport methods, involving a combination of dogs, ponies and a specially designed motor vehicle.

Neither ponies nor motor traction had been used in the Antarctic before, although ponies had been used by Frederick George Jackson during the Jackson–Harmsworth Arctic expedition of 1894–1897. Despite Jackson's confused reports of his ponies' prowess, and contrary to specific advice from Fridtjof Nansen, a Norwegian polar traveller, Shackleton decided he would take 15 ponies, later scaled down to 10. By the time he announced his plans to the RGS in February 1907 Shackleton had revised his cost estimate to a more realistic £30,000 (updated value £4,010,000). However, the response of the RGS to Shackleton's proposals was muted; Shackleton would learn later that the Society was by this time aware of Scott's wish to lead a new expedition and that the Society wished to reserve its full approval for Scott.

=== Nimrod ===
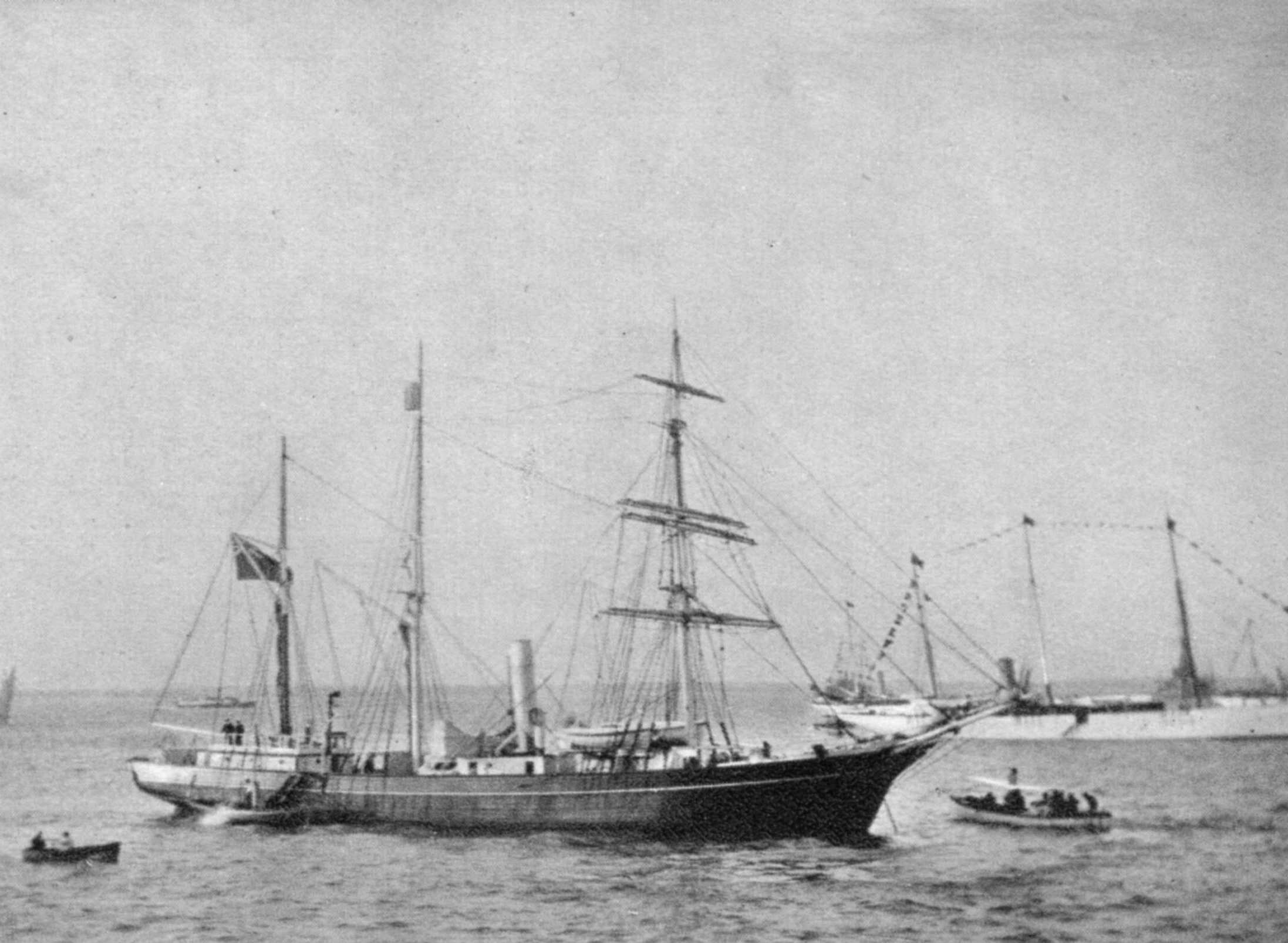
The expedition's ship Nimrod departing for the South Pole

Shackleton intended to arrive in Antarctica in January 1908, which meant leaving England during the 1907 summer. He therefore had six months to secure the financing, acquire and fit out a ship, buy all the equipment and supplies, and recruit the personnel. In April, believing that he had got the backing of Scottish businessman Donald Steuart, Shackleton travelled to Norway intending to buy a 700-ton polar vessel, Bjorn, that would have served ideally as an expedition ship. When Steuart withdrew his support, however, Bjorn was beyond Shackleton's means. Bjorn was eventually acquired by German explorer Wilhelm Filchner and, renamed Deutschland, was used in his 1911–1913 voyage to the Weddell Sea. Shackleton had to settle for the elderly, much smaller Nimrod, a forty-year-old wooden sealer of 334 gross register tons, (Note: Nimrod was less than half of the size of Discovery, a newly built 736 grt vessel used by Scott in the Discovery Expedition in 1901–1904. See Paine, p. 102 and Lloyd's Register 1934–35.) which he was able to acquire for £5,000 (updated value £668,000).

Shackleton was shocked by his first sight of Nimrod after her arrival in London from Newfoundland in June 1907. "She was much dilapidated and smelt strongly of seal oil, and an inspection [...] showed that she needed caulking and that her masts would have to be renewed." However, in the hands of experienced ship-fitters she soon "assumed a more satisfactory appearance." Later, Shackleton reported, he became extremely proud of the sturdy little ship.

=== Fundraising ===
By early July 1907 Shackleton had secured little financial support beyond Beardmore's guarantee and was lacking the funds to complete the refit of Nimrod. In mid-July he approached the philanthropic Earl of Iveagh, otherwise known as Edward Guinness, head of the Anglo-Irish brewing family, who agreed to guarantee the sum of £2,000 (updated value £270,000) provided that Shackleton found other backers to contribute a further £6,000. Shackleton was able to do this, the extra funds including £2,000 from Sir Philip Brocklehurst, who paid this sum to secure a place on the expedition.

A last-minute gift of £4,000 from Shackleton's cousin William Bell still left the expedition far short of the required £30,000, but enabled Nimrod's refit to be finished. Fundraising continued in Australia after the ship arrived there; a further £5,000 was provided as a gift from the Australian government, and the New Zealand government gave £1,000. By these means, and with other smaller loans and donations, the £30,000 was raised, although by the end of the expedition total costs had risen, by Shackleton's estimate, to £45,000. (Note: It eventually required a British government grant of £20,000 to enable Shackleton to repay his guarantors, and it is likely that some debts were written off. See Huntford, pp. 314–315.)

Shackleton expected to make large sums from his book about the expedition and from lectures. He also hoped to profit from sales of special postage stamps bearing the cancellation stamp of the Antarctica post office that Shackleton, appointed temporary postmaster by the New Zealand government, intended to establish there. None of these schemes produced the anticipated riches, although the post office was set up at Cape Royds and used as a conduit for the expedition's mail. (Note: An Antarctic post office had been established in the South Orkney Islands in 1904 at the Orcadas meteorological station set up by William Speirs Bruce's Scottish National Antarctic Expedition. See Speak, p. 92.)

=== Personnel ===
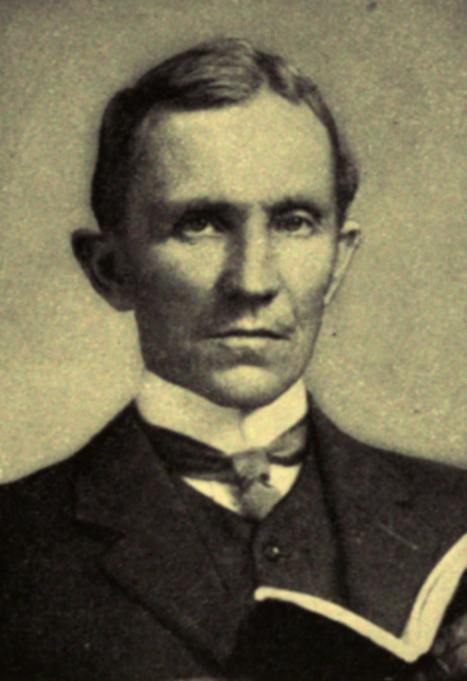
Edgeworth David, who headed the scientific team

Douglas Mawson, a late addition to the scientific team

Shackleton hoped to recruit a strong contingent from the Discovery Expedition and offered his former comrade Edward Adrian Wilson the post of chief scientist and second-in-command. Wilson refused, citing his work with the Board of Agriculture's Committee on the Investigation of Grouse Disease. Further refusals followed from former Discovery colleagues Michael Barne, Reginald Skelton and finally George Mulock, who inadvertently revealed to Shackleton that the Discovery officers had all committed themselves to Scott and his as-yet unannounced expedition plans. The only Discovery hands to join Shackleton were the two petty officers, Frank Wild and Ernest Joyce. Apparently Shackleton spotted Joyce on the top deck of a bus as it passed the expedition's London offices, whereupon someone was sent to find him and bring him in.

Shackleton's second-in-command—although this was not clarified until the expedition reached the Antarctic—was Jameson Adams, a Royal Naval Reserve lieutenant who had turned down the chance of a regular commission to join Shackleton. He would also act as the expedition's meteorologist. Nimrod's captain was another naval reserve officer, Rupert England; 23-year-old John King Davis, who would later make his own reputation as an Antarctic captain, was appointed chief officer at the last moment. Aeneas Mackintosh, a merchant navy officer from P&O, was originally second officer, but was later transferred to the shore party, being replaced as second officer by A. E. Harbord. Others in the shore party were the two surgeons, Alistair Mackay and Eric Marshall, Bernard Day the motor expert, and Sir Philip Brocklehurst, the subscribing member who had been taken on as assistant geologist.

The small scientific team that departed from England included 41-year-old biologist James Murray and 21-year-old geologist Raymond Priestley, a future founder of the Scott Polar Research Institute. Two important additions to the team were made in Australia. The first of these was Edgeworth David, a professor of geology at the University of Sydney, who became the party's chief scientific officer. The second was a former pupil of David's, Douglas Mawson, a lecturer in mineralogy at the University of Adelaide. Both had originally intended to sail to Antarctica and then immediately back with Nimrod but were persuaded to become full members of the expedition. David was instrumental in securing the Australian government's £5,000 grant.

Before departure for the Antarctic in August 1907, Joyce and Wild took a crash course in printing methods, as it was Shackleton's intention to publish a book or magazine while in the Antarctic.

==== Shore Party ====
Name (Note: Originally Aeneas Mackintosh was selected as a member of the Shore Party, a medical emergency on Nimrod forced him to return to New Zealand. See)	Nationality	Position
Ernest Shackleton	Ireland	Expedition Leader
Jameson Boyd Adams	Great Britain	Second in command/Meteorologist
Edgeworth David	Australia	Director of Scientific Staff/Geologist
Douglas Mawson	Australia	Geologist
Eric Marshall	Great Britain	Physician/Cartographer/Photographer
Alistair Mackay	Great Britain	Physician
James Murray	Great Britain	Biologist
Raymond Priestley	Great Britain	Geologist
Ernest Joyce	Great Britain	General Stores/Zoological Collections
Frank Wild	Great Britain	Provisions
George Marston	Great Britain	Artist
Bertram Armytage	Australia	Pony Handler
William Roberts	Great Britain	Cook/Assistant Zoologist
William Michell	Canada	Geologist
Philip Brocklehurst	Great Britain	Assistant Geologist
Bernard Day	Great Britain	Electrician/Mechanic

== Promise to Scott ==
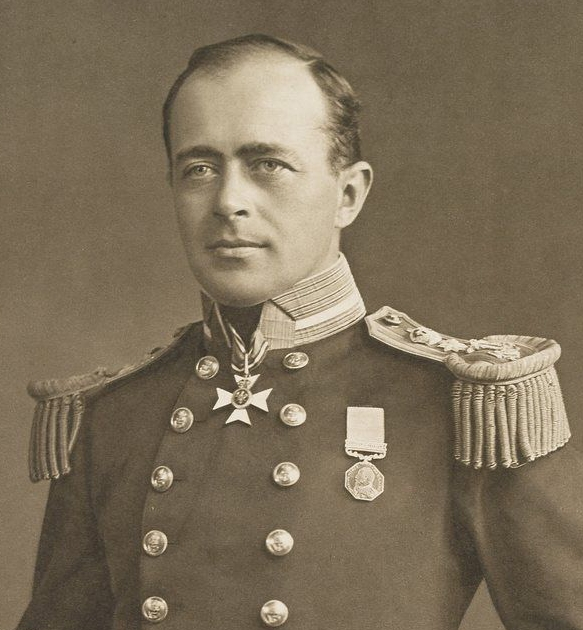
Robert Falcon Scott

Shackleton's February 1907 announcement that he intended to base his expedition at the old Discovery headquarters was noted by Scott, whose own future Antarctic plans were at that stage unannounced. In a letter to Shackleton, Scott claimed priority rights to McMurdo Sound. "I feel I have a sort of right to my own field of work," he wrote, adding: "anyone who has had to do with exploration will regard this region primarily as mine". He concluded by reminding Shackleton of his duty of loyalty towards his former commander.

Shackleton's initial reply was accommodating: "I would like to fall in with your views as far as possible without creating a position that would be untenable to myself". Wilson, asked by Shackleton to mediate, took an even tougher line than Scott. "I think you should retire from McMurdo Sound", he wrote, advising Shackleton not to make any plans to work from anywhere in the entire Ross Sea quarter until Scott decided "what limits he puts on his own rights". To this Shackleton replied: "There is no doubt in my mind that his rights end at the base he asked for [...] I consider I have reached my limit and I go no further".

The matter was unresolved when Scott returned from sea duty in May 1907. Scott pressed for a line of demarcation at 170° W—everything to the west of that line, including McMurdo Sound, Ross Island, and Victoria Land, would be Scott's preserve. Shackleton, with other concerns pressing on him, felt obliged to concede. On 17 May he signed a declaration stating that, "I am leaving the McMurdo base to you", and that he would seek to land further east, either at the Barrier Inlet visited briefly during the Discovery Expedition, or at King Edward VII Land. He would not touch the coast of Victoria Land at all. It was a capitulation to Scott and Wilson, and meant forfeiting the expedition's aim of reaching the South Magnetic Pole which was located within Victoria Land. Polar historian Beau Riffenburgh believes this was "a promise that should never ethically have been demanded and one that should never have been given, impacting as it might on the entire safety of Shackleton's expedition". The dispute soured relations between the two men (who nevertheless maintained public civilities) and would eventually lead to the complete rupture of Shackleton's formerly close friendship with Wilson.

In his own account of the expedition, Shackleton makes no reference to the wrangle with Scott. He merely states that "before we finally left England I had decided that if possible I would establish my base in King Edward VII Land instead of [...] McMurdo Sound".

== Expedition ==
=== Voyage south ===
After inspection by King Edward VII and Queen Alexandra, Nimrod sailed on 11 August 1907. Shackleton remained behind on expedition business; he and other expedition members followed on a faster ship. The entire complement came together in New Zealand, ready for the ship's departure to Antarctica on New Year's Day, 1908. As a means of conserving fuel, Shackleton had arranged with the New Zealand government for Nimrod to be towed to the Antarctic Circle, a distance of approximately 1,400 nautical miles (2,600 km; 1,600 mi), the costs of the tow being met partly by the government and partly by the Union Steam Ship Company as a contribution to the expedition. On 14 January, in sight of the first icebergs, the towline was cut; Nimrod, under her own power, proceeded southward into the floating pack ice, heading for the Barrier Inlet where six years earlier Discovery had paused to allow Scott and Shackleton to take experimental balloon flights.

The Barrier (later known as the Ross Ice Shelf) was sighted on 23 January, but the inlet had disappeared; the Barrier edge had changed significantly in the intervening years, and the section which had included the inlet had broken away to form a considerable bay, which Shackleton named the Bay of Whales after the large number of whales seen there. Shackleton was not prepared to risk wintering on a Barrier surface that might calve into the sea, so he turned the ship towards King Edward VII Land. After repeated efforts to approach this coast had failed, and with rapidly moving ice threatening to trap the ship, Nimrod was forced to retreat. Shackleton's only choice now, other than abandonment of the expedition's goals, was to break the promise he had given to Scott. On 25 January he ordered the ship to head for McMurdo Sound.

=== Cape Royds ===
==== Establishing the base ====
Inside the Cape Royds Hut, winter 1908. Included in the picture are Shackleton (left background), Armitage (Standing background), Adams (smoking curved pipe), Wild (working on the sledge) and Joyce (extreme right, foreground). A poster advertising ladies' corsets hangs on the wall.

On arriving in McMurdo Sound on 29 January 1908, Nimrod's progress southward to the Discovery base at Hut Point was blocked by frozen sea. Shackleton decided to wait a few days in the hope that the ice would break up. During this delay, second officer Aeneas Mackintosh suffered an accident that led to the loss of his right eye. After emergency surgery by Marshall and Mackay, he was forced to relinquish his shore party place and go back to New Zealand with Nimrod. He recovered sufficiently to return with the ship in the following season.

On 3 February Shackleton decided not to wait for the ice to shift but to make his headquarters at the nearest practicable landing place, Cape Royds. Late that evening the ship was moored, and a suitable site for the expedition's prefabricated hut was selected. The site was separated from Hut Point by 20 nautical miles (37 km; 23 mi) of sea, with no landward route to the south. Shackleton believed the party was "fortunate to get winter quarters as near as this to our starting point for the south."

The following days were occupied with the landing of stores and equipment. This work was hampered by poor weather and by the caution of Captain England, who frequently took the ship out into the bay until ice conditions at the landing ground were in his view safer. The next fortnight followed this pattern, leading to sharp dissent between Shackleton and the captain. At one point, Shackleton asked England to stand down on the grounds that he was ill, but England refused. The task of unloading became, in Riffenburgh's description, "mind-numbingly difficult" but was finally completed on 22 February. Nimrod at last sailed away north, England unaware that ship's engineer Harry Dunlop was carrying a letter from Shackleton to the expedition's New Zealand agent, requesting a replacement captain for the return voyage next year. This knowledge was an open secret among the shore party; Marshall recorded in his diary that he was "glad to see the last of [England] ... whole thing damned disgrace to name of country!"

==== Ascent of Mount Erebus ====
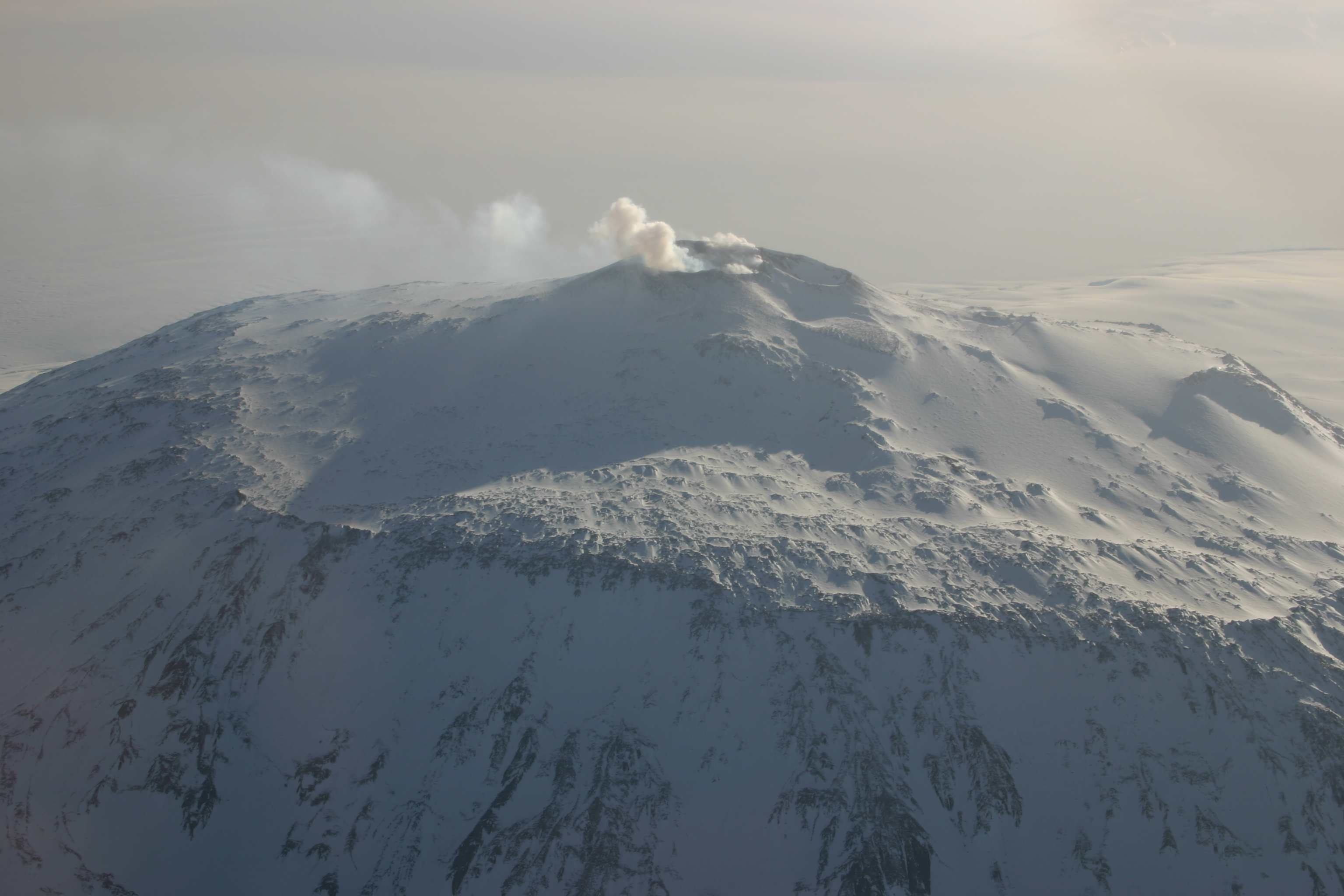
Mount Erebus

After Nimrod's departure, the sea ice broke up, cutting off the party's route to the Barrier and thus making preparatory sledging and depot-laying impossible. Shackleton decided to give the expedition impetus by ordering an immediate attempt to ascend Mount Erebus. This mountain, 12,450 feet (3,790 m) high, had never been climbed. A party from Discovery (which had included Wild and Joyce) had explored the foothills in 1904 but had not ascended higher than 3,000 feet (910 m). Neither Wild nor Joyce was in the Nimrod Expedition's main Erebus party, which consisted of David, Mawson and Mackay. With Marshall, Adams and Brocklehurst forming a support group, the ascent began on 5 March.

On 7 March the two groups combined at around 5,500 feet (1,700 m) and all advanced towards the summit. On the following day a blizzard held them up, but early on 9 March the climb resumed; later that day the summit of the lower, main crater, was achieved. By this time Brocklehurst's feet were too frostbitten for him to continue, so he was left in camp while the others advanced to the active crater, which they reached after four hours. Several meteorological experiments were carried out and many rock samples were taken. Thereafter a rapid descent was made, mainly by sliding down successive snow-slopes. The party reached the Cape Royds hut "nearly dead", according to Eric Marshall, on 11 March.

==== Winter 1908 ====
The expedition's hut, a prefabricated structure measuring 33 x 19 feet (10m x 5.8m), was ready for occupation by the end of February. It was divided into a series of mainly two-person cubicles, with a kitchen area, a darkroom, storage and laboratory space. The ponies were housed in stalls built on the most sheltered side of the hut, while the dog kennels were placed close to the porch. Shackleton's inclusive leadership style, in contrast to that of Scott, meant no demarcation between upper and lower decks—all lived, worked and ate together. Morale was high; as Brocklehurst recorded, Shackleton "had a faculty for treating each member of the expedition as though he were valuable to it".

In the ensuing months of winter darkness Joyce and Wild printed around 30 copies of the expedition's book, Aurora Australis, which were sewn and bound using packaging materials. The most important winter's work, however, was preparing for the following season's major journeys, which were to include attempts on both the South Pole and the South Magnetic Pole. By making his base in McMurdo Sound, Shackleton had been able to reinstate the Magnetic Pole as an expedition objective. Shackleton himself would be leading the South Pole journey, which had suffered a serious setback during the winter when four of the remaining ponies died, mainly from eating volcanic sand for its salt content.

=== Southern journey ===
Map of the Nimrod Expedition

==== Outward march ====
Shackleton's choice of a four-man team for the southern journey to the South Pole was largely determined by the number of surviving ponies. Influenced by his experiences on the Discovery Expedition, he had put his confidence in ponies rather than dogs for the long polar march. The motor car, which ran well on flat ice, could not cope with Barrier surfaces and was not considered for the polar journey. The men chosen by Shackleton to accompany him were Marshall, Adams and Wild. Joyce, whose Antarctic experience exceeded all save Wild's, was excluded from the party after Marshall's medical examination raised doubts about his fitness.

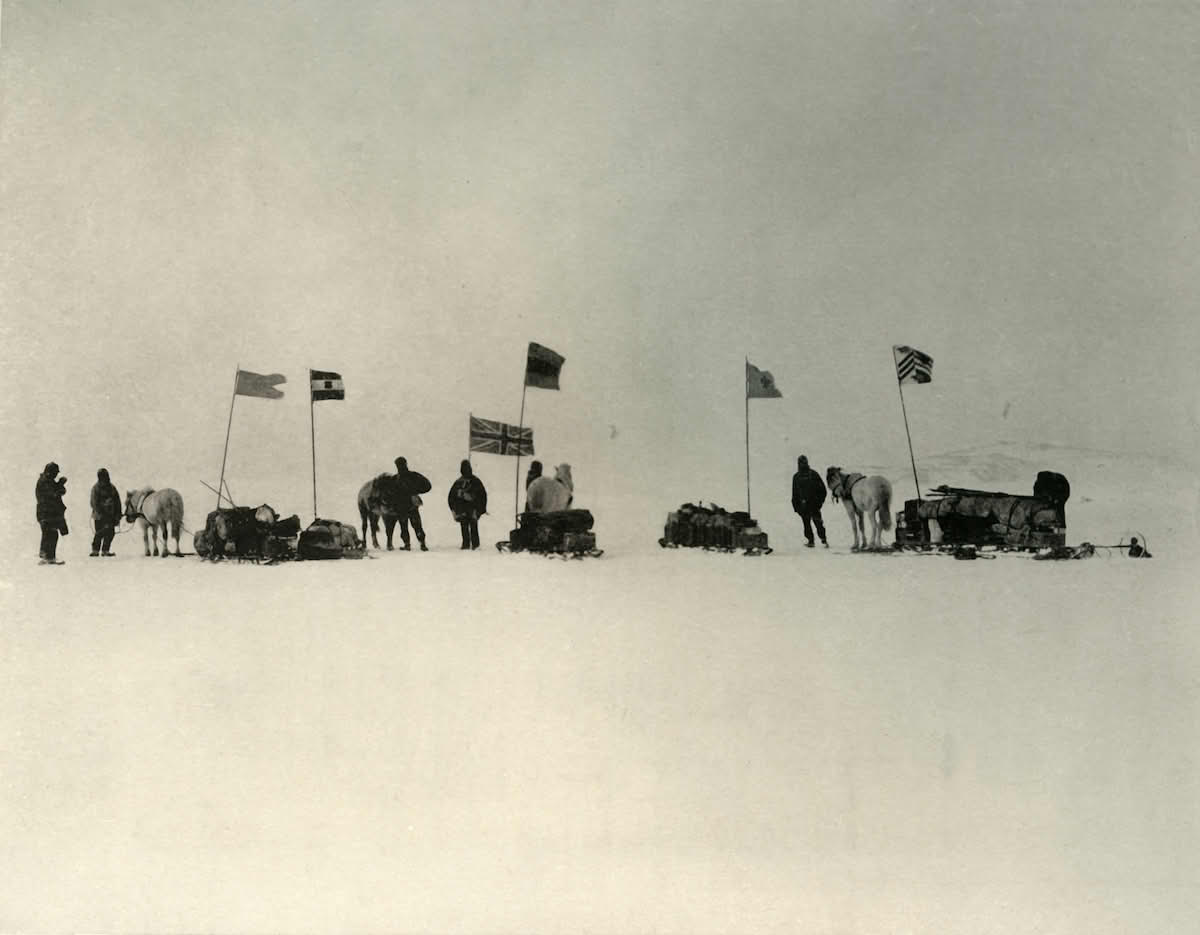
The main polar party, along with an accompanying support party, about to embark on the journey south

The march began on 29 October 1908. Shackleton had calculated the return distance to the Pole as 1,494 nautical miles (2,767 km; 1,719 mi). His initial plan allowed 91 days for the return journey, requiring a daily average distance of about 16 nautical miles (30 km; 18 mi). After a slow start due to a combination of poor weather and lameness in the horses, Shackleton reduced the daily food allowance to extend the total available journey time to 110 days. This required a shorter daily average of around 13½ nautical miles. Between 9 and 21 November they made good progress, but the ponies suffered on the difficult Barrier surface, and the first of the four had to be shot when the party reached 81° S. On 26 November a new farthest south record was established as they passed the 82° 17' mark set by Scott's southern march in December 1902. Shackleton's party covered the distance in 29 days compared with Scott's 59, using a track considerably east of Scott's to avoid the surface problems the earlier journey had encountered.

As the group moved into unknown territory, the Barrier surface became increasingly disturbed and broken; two more ponies succumbed to the strain. The mountains to the west curved round to block their path southward, and the party's attention was caught by a "brilliant gleam of light" in the sky ahead. The reason for this phenomenon became clear on 3 December when, after a climb through the foothills of the mountain chain, they saw before them what Shackleton later described as "an open road to the south, [...] a great glacier, running almost south to north between two huge mountain ranges". Shackleton christened this glacier the "Beardmore" after the expedition's biggest sponsor.

Travel on the glacier surface proved to be a trial, especially for Socks, the remaining pony, who had great difficulty in finding secure footings. On 7 December, Socks disappeared down a deep crevasse, very nearly taking Wild with him. However, the pony's harness broke, and the sledge containing their supplies remained on the surface. For the rest of the southward journey and the whole of the return trip they had to rely on man-hauling.

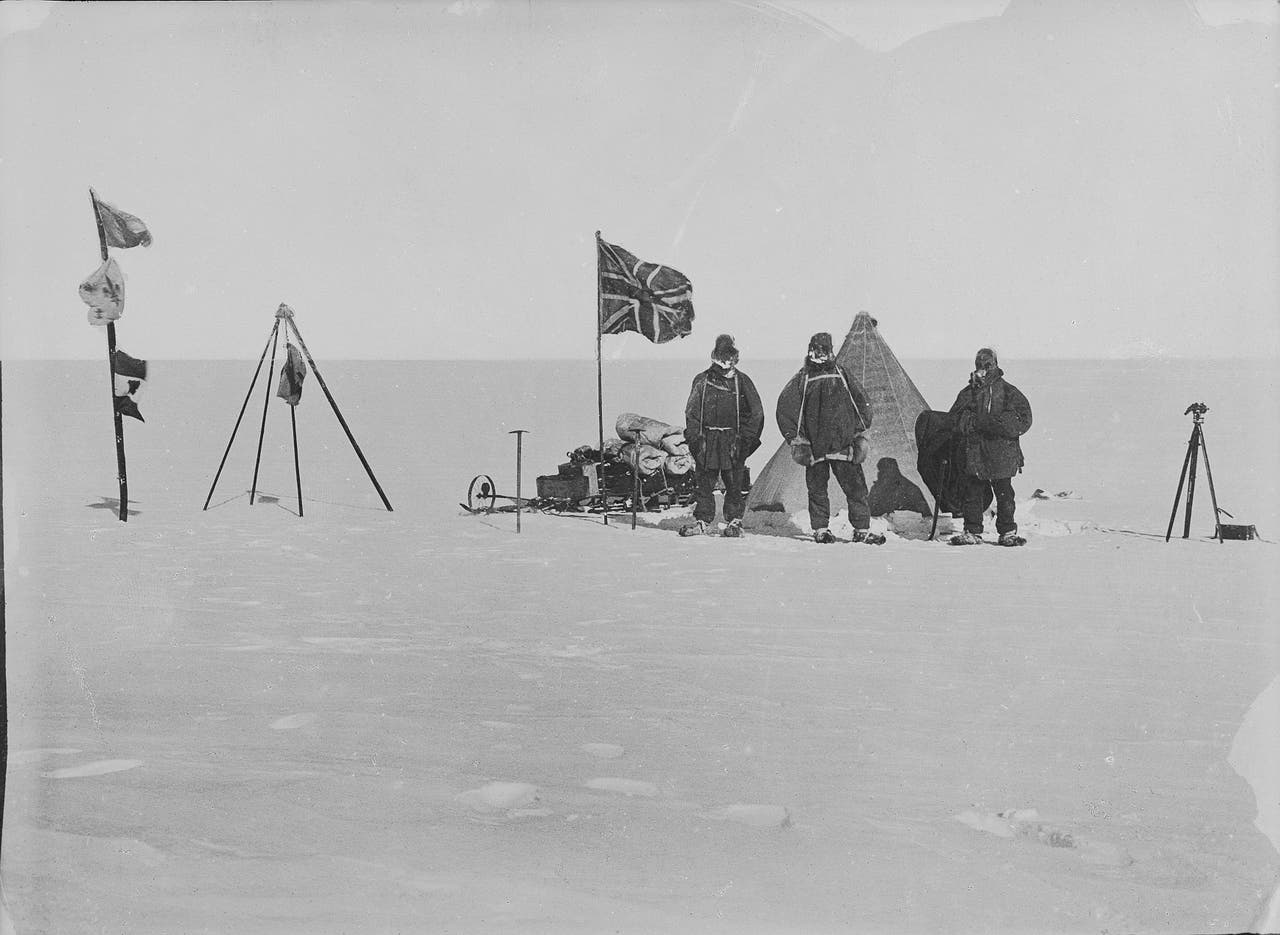
The polar party make camp for Christmas Day

As the journey continued, personal antagonisms emerged. Wild privately expressed the wish that Marshall would "fall down a crevasse about a thousand feet deep". Marshall wrote that following Shackleton to the Pole was "like following an old woman. Always panicking". However, Christmas Day was celebrated with crème de menthe and cigars. Their position was 85° 51' S, still 249 nautical miles (461 km; 287 mi) from the Pole, and they were now carrying barely a month's supply of food, having stored the rest in depots for their return journey. They could not cover the remaining distance to the Pole and back with this amount of food. However, Shackleton was not yet prepared to admit that the Pole was beyond them and decided to go forward after cutting food rations further, and dumping all but the most essential equipment.

On Boxing Day the glacier ascent was at last completed, and the march on the polar plateau began. Conditions did not ease; Shackleton recorded 31 December as the "hardest day we have had". On the next day he noted that, having attained 87° 6½′ S, they had beaten North and South polar records. That day, referring to Marshall and Adams, Wild wrote: "if we only had Joyce and Marston here instead of those two grubscoffing useless beggars we would have done it [the Pole] easily." On 4 January 1909, Shackleton finally accepted that the Pole was beyond them and revised his goal to the symbolic achievement of getting within 100 geographical miles of the Pole. The party struggled on, at the borders of survival, until on 9 January 1909, after a last dash forward without the sledge or other equipment, the march ended. "We have shot our bolt", wrote Shackleton, "and the tale is 88° 23' S". They were 97.5 geographical miles from the South Pole. The Union Jack was duly planted, and Shackleton named the polar plateau after King Edward VII. (Note: Three years later, on reaching the South Pole, Roald Amundsen named the same plateau after King Haakon VII of Norway. (Amundsen, Vol. II, p. 122.) Neither name survives on modern maps.)

==== Return journey ====
On the return journey. The party reach a depot on the Great Ice Barrier

Shackleton's party turned for home after 73 days' southward travel. Rations had been cut several times to extend the return journey time beyond the original 110-day estimate. Shackleton now aimed to reach Hut Point in 50 days, since according to Shackleton's prior orders Nimrod, having returned to take the expedition home, would depart on 1 March at the latest. The four men were now much weakened, yet in the following days they achieved impressive distances, reaching the head of the glacier on 19 January. As they began the descent they had five days' food at half rations, to last them until the Lower Glacier depot; during the ascent the same distance had taken 12 days. Shackleton's physical condition was by now a major concern, yet according to Adams "the worse he felt, the harder he pulled".

The depot was reached on 28 January. Wild, ill with dysentery, was unable to pull or to eat anything but biscuits, which were in short supply. On 31 January Shackleton forced his own breakfast biscuit on Wild, a gesture that moved Wild to write: "BY GOD I shall never forget. Thousands of pounds would not have bought that one biscuit". A few days later, the rest of the party were struck with severe enteritis, the result of eating tainted pony-meat. But the pace of march had to be maintained; the small amounts of food carried between depots would make any delay fatal. However, a strong wind behind them enabled them to set a sail on the sledge and maintain a good marching rate.

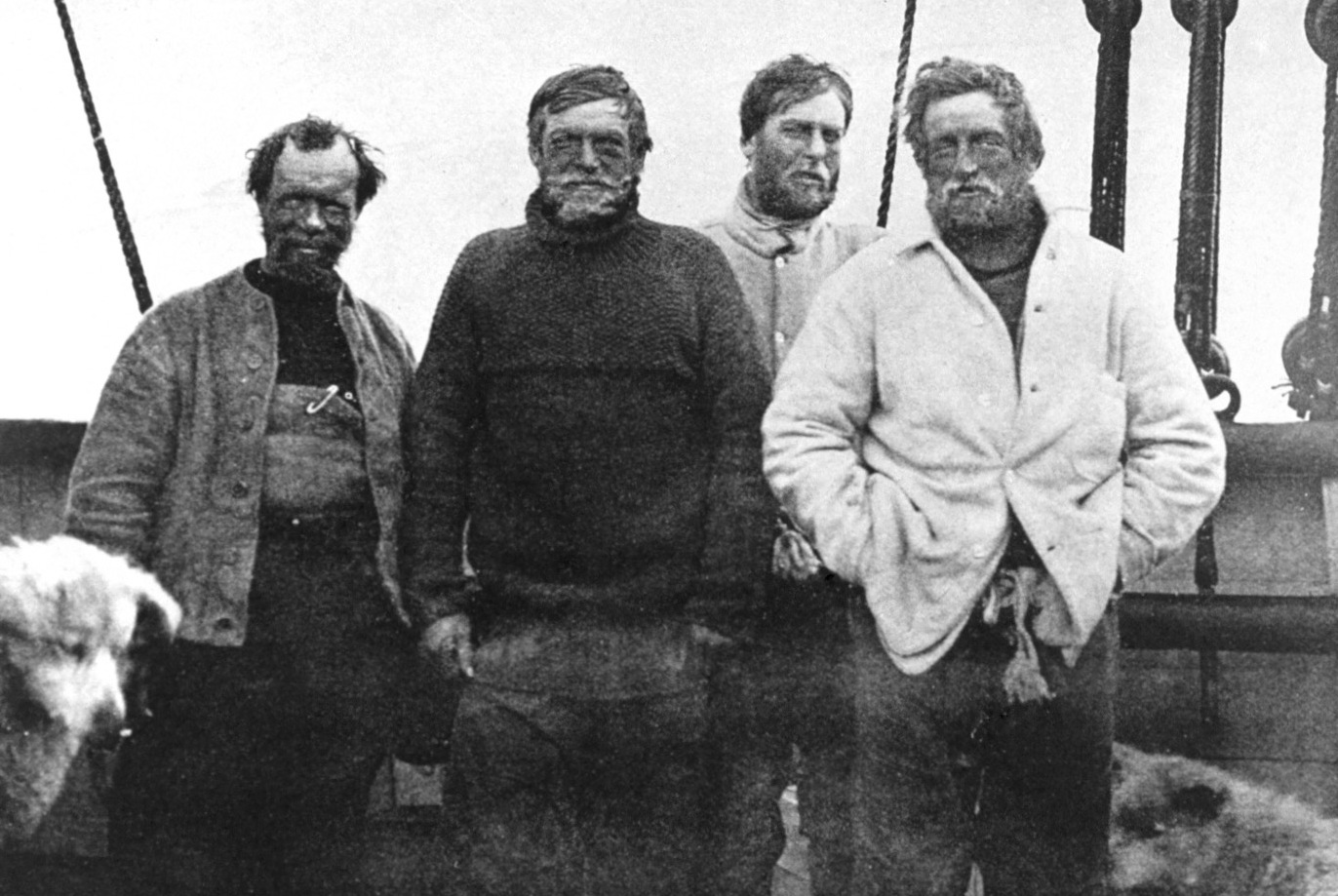
Wild, Shackleton, Marshall and Adams aboard Nimrod after their southern journey

"We are so thin that our bones ache as we lie on the hard snow", wrote Shackleton. From 18 February onward they began to pick up familiar landmarks, and on the 23rd they reached Bluff Depot, which to their great relief had been copiously resupplied by Joyce. The range of delicacies over and above the crates of regular supplies was listed by Shackleton: "Carlsbad plums, eggs, cakes, plum pudding, gingerbread and crystallised fruit". Wild's laconic comment was, "Good old Joyce".

Their food worries were now resolved, but they still had to get back to Hut Point before the 1 March deadline. The final leg of their march was interrupted by a blizzard, which held them in camp for 24 hours. On 27 February, when they were still 33 nautical miles (61 km; 38 mi) from safety, Marshall collapsed. Shackleton then decided that he and Wild would make a dash for Hut Point in hopes of finding Nimrod and holding her until the other two could be rescued. They reached the hut late on 28 February. Hoping that the ship was nearby, they sought to attract its attention by setting fire to a small wooden hut used for magnetic observations. Shortly afterwards the ship, which had been anchored at the Glacier Tongue, came into view: "No happier sight ever met the eyes of man", wrote Wild later. It was a further three days before Adams and Marshall could be picked up from the Barrier, but by 4 March the whole southern party was aboard and Shackleton was able to order full steam towards the north.

=== Northern Party ===
While preparing for his southern journey, Shackleton gave instructions to David to lead a northern party to Victoria Land to carry out magnetic and geological work. The party was to try to reach the Magnetic Pole, and was to carry out a full geological survey in the Dry Valley area. (Note: The dry valley (snow-free) region of the western mountains had been discovered during Scott's western journey in 1903, but had yet to be properly surveyed. See Crane, p. 270.) David's party consisted of himself, Mawson and Mackay. It would be a man-hauling party; the dogs remained at base to be used for depot-laying and other routine work. The party had orders to plant the Union Jack at the Magnetic Pole and to take possession of Victoria Land for the British Empire. After several days' preparatory work, they started out on 5 October 1908, drawn for the first few miles by the motor car.

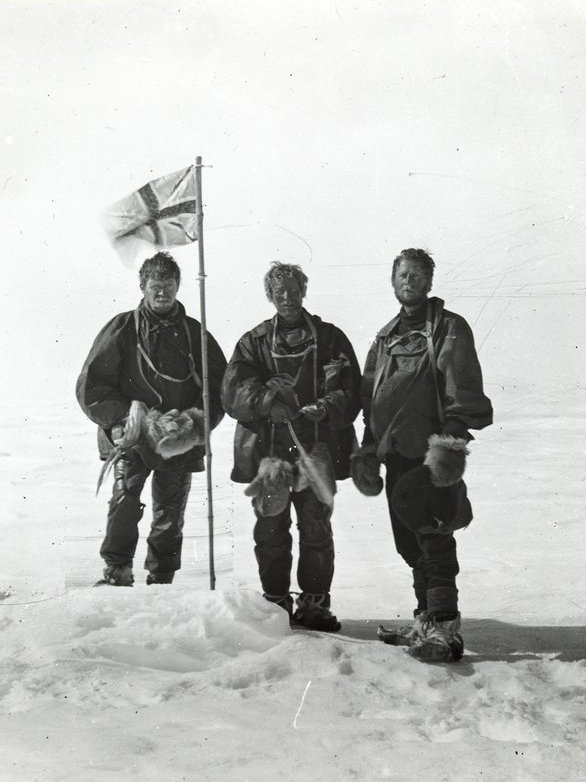
(l. to r.) Mackay, Edgeworth David, and Mawson at the Southern Magnetic Pole, 17 January 1909

Due to sea ice conditions and adverse weather, progress was initially very slow. By the end of October they had crossed McMurdo Sound and advanced 60 miles (100 km) up the difficult Victoria Land coast, at which point they decided to concentrate all their efforts on reaching the Magnetic Pole. After traversing the Nordenskjöld Ice Tongue and the treacherous Drygalski Ice Tongue they were finally able to leave the coast and turn north-west, towards the Magnetic Pole's approximate location. Before then, David had a narrow escape after falling into a crevasse but was rescued by Mawson.

Their way up to the inland plateau was via a labyrinthine glacier (later named the Reeves Glacier after the RGS's main map curator), which brought them on 27 December to a hard snow surface. This enabled them to move more swiftly, at a rate of about 10 nautical miles (19 km; 12 mi) daily, taking regular magnetic observations. On 16 January, these observations showed them to be about 13 nautical miles (24 km; 15 mi) from the Magnetic Pole. The next day, 17 January 1909, they reached their goal, fixing the pole's position as 72° 15' S, 155° 16' E, at an elevation of 7,260 feet (2,210 m). In a muted ceremony, David took formal possession of the area for the British Empire.

Exhausted, and short of food, the party faced a return journey of 250 nautical miles (460 km; 290 mi), with just 15 days to complete it if they were to make their prearranged coastal rendezvous with Nimrod. Despite increasing physical weakness they maintained their daily distances, and on 31 January were 16 nautical miles (30 km; 18 mi) from their agreed pick-up point. Bad weather delayed them, and the rendezvous was not reached until 2 February. That night, in heavy drifting snow, Nimrod passed by them, unable to make out their camp. Two days later, however, after Nimrod had turned south again, the group was spotted from the ship and was able to scramble to safety, although in the rush to get aboard Mawson fell 18 feet (5.5 m) down a crevasse. The party had been travelling for four months and were wearing the same clothes in which they had departed Cape Royds; reportedly "the aroma was overpowering". Before this rescue, Nimrod had picked up a geological party consisting of Priestley, Brocklehurst and Bertram Armytage, who had been carrying out geological work in the Ferrar Glacier region.

== Aftermath ==
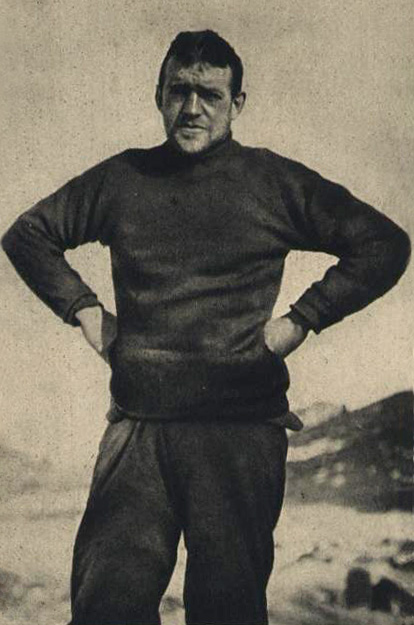
Sir Ernest Shackleton: "What Nansen is to the North, Shackleton is to the South"—Roald Amundsen

On 23 March 1909, Shackleton landed in New Zealand and cabled a 2,500-word report to the London Daily Mail, with which he had an exclusive contract. Amid the acclamation and unstinting praise that Shackleton received from the exploring community, including Fridtjof Nansen and Roald Amundsen, the response of the RGS was more guarded. Its former president, Sir Clements Markham, privately expressed his disbelief of Shackleton's claimed latitude. However, on 14 June, Shackleton was met at London's Charing Cross Station by a very large crowd, which included RGS president Leonard Darwin and a rather reluctant Captain Scott.

As to the latitude claimed, the reason for doubting its accuracy was that after 3 January all positions had been computed by dead reckoning: on direction, speed and elapsed time. The last proper observation, on 3 January, had calculated the latitude as 87° 22'. Shackleton's table of distances show that over the next three days they covered just over 40 nautical miles (74 km; 46 mi), to reach an estimated 88° 7' on 6 January. They were then held up for two days by a blizzard. On 9 January 1909, the table shows that the party travelled a further 16 nautical miles (30 km; 18 mi) to reach their farthest south, and the same distance back to camp. This distance in a single day far exceeded those for any other stage of the journey. Shackleton explained that this was a dash, "half running, half walking", unencumbered by the sledge or other equipment. Each of the four men independently confirmed his belief in the latitude achieved, and none gave any subsequent cause for his word to be doubted.

Shackleton was made a Commander of the Royal Victorian Order (CVO) by King Edward VII, who later conferred a knighthood on him. The RGS presented him with a gold medal, although apparently with reservations—"We do not propose to make the Medal so large as that which was awarded to Captain Scott", recorded an official. Although in the eyes of the public he was a hero, the riches that Shackleton had anticipated failed to materialise. The soaring costs of the expedition and the need to meet loan guarantees meant that he was saved from financial embarrassment only by a belated government grant of £20,000.

The farthest south record of the Nimrod Expedition stood for less than three years, until Amundsen reached the South Pole on 15 December 1911. For his trail-breaking achievements, Shackleton received a fulsome tribute from Amundsen: "What Nansen is to the North, Shackleton is to the South". Thereafter, Shackleton's Antarctic ambitions were fixed on a transcontinental crossing, which he attempted unsuccessfully with the Imperial Trans-Antarctic Expedition of 1914–1917, although his status as a leading figure in the Heroic Age of Antarctic Exploration was by then assured. Other members of the Nimrod Expedition also achieved fame and standing in future years. David, Adams, Mawson and Priestley all eventually received knighthoods, the latter two continuing their polar work on further expeditions, though neither went south again with Shackleton. Mawson led the 1911–13 Australian Antarctic Expedition, and Priestley was part of the Terra Nova Expedition's scientific team. Wild was second-in-command to the "Boss" on the Imperial Trans-Antarctic Expedition and on the short Quest Expedition, where he took over command after Shackleton's death at South Georgia Island in 1922. Ten years after her return from the Antarctic, Nimrod was battered to pieces in the North Sea after running aground on the Barber Sands off the Norfolk coast on 31 January 1919. Only two of her 12-person crew survived.

Several mostly intact cases of whisky and brandy left behind at Cape Royds in 1909 were recovered in 2010, for analysis by a distilling company. A revival of the vintage (and since lost) formula for the particular brands found has been offered for sale with a portion of the proceeds to benefit the New Zealand Antarctic Heritage Trust, which discovered the lost spirits.

== See also ==
- Heroic Age of Antarctic Exploration
- List of Antarctic expeditions

== Sources ==
- Amundsen, Roald (1976). The South Pole. Vol. I & II. London: C. Hurst. ISBN 978-0-903983-47-1.
- Burke, David (2009). Body at the Melbourne Club : Bertram Armytage, Antarctica's forgotten man. Kent Town, S. Aust.: Wakefield Press. ISBN 978-1-86254-833-6.
- Crane, David (2005). Scott of the Antarctic. London: Harper Collins. ISBN 978-0-00-715068-7.
- Fisher, Margery and James (1957). Shackleton. London: James Barrie Books.
- Huntford, Roland (1985). Shackleton. London: Hodder & Stoughton. ISBN 978-0-340-25007-5. OCLC 13108800.
- Mills, Leif (1999). Frank Wild. Whitby: Caedmon of Whitby. ISBN 978-0-905355-48-1.
- Paine, Lincoln (2000). Ships of Discovery and Exploration. Boston: Houghton Mifflin. ISBN 978-0-395-98415-4.
- Preston, Diana (1997). A First Rate Tragedy: Captain Scott's Antarctic Expeditions. London: Constable & Co. ISBN 978-0-09-479530-3.
- Riffenburgh, Beau (2005). Nimrod: Ernest Shackleton and the Extraordinary Story of the 1907–09 British Antarctic Expedition. London: Bloomsbury Publishing. ISBN 978-0-7475-7253-4. OCLC 56659120.
- Shackleton, Ernest (1911). The Heart of the Antarctic. London: William Heinemann.
- Speak, Peter (2003). William Speirs Bruce: Polar Explorer and Scottish Nationalist. Edinburgh: National Museums of Scotland. ISBN 978-1-901663-71-6.

=== Online sources ===
- "Purchasing Power of British Pounds from 1264 to Present". MeasuringWorth.
- "Explorers' century-old whisky found in Antarctic". USA Today. 5 February 2010.
- Katz, Gregory (18 January 2011). "Explorer's century-old scotch returns from Antarctica". Toronto Star. Associated Press.
- "Whisky buried by Ernest Shackleton expedition recreated". BBC News. 4 April 2011.
