= Nimrod (1867 ship) =

Steam-assisted barquentine built in 1867, best known for Antarctic exploration

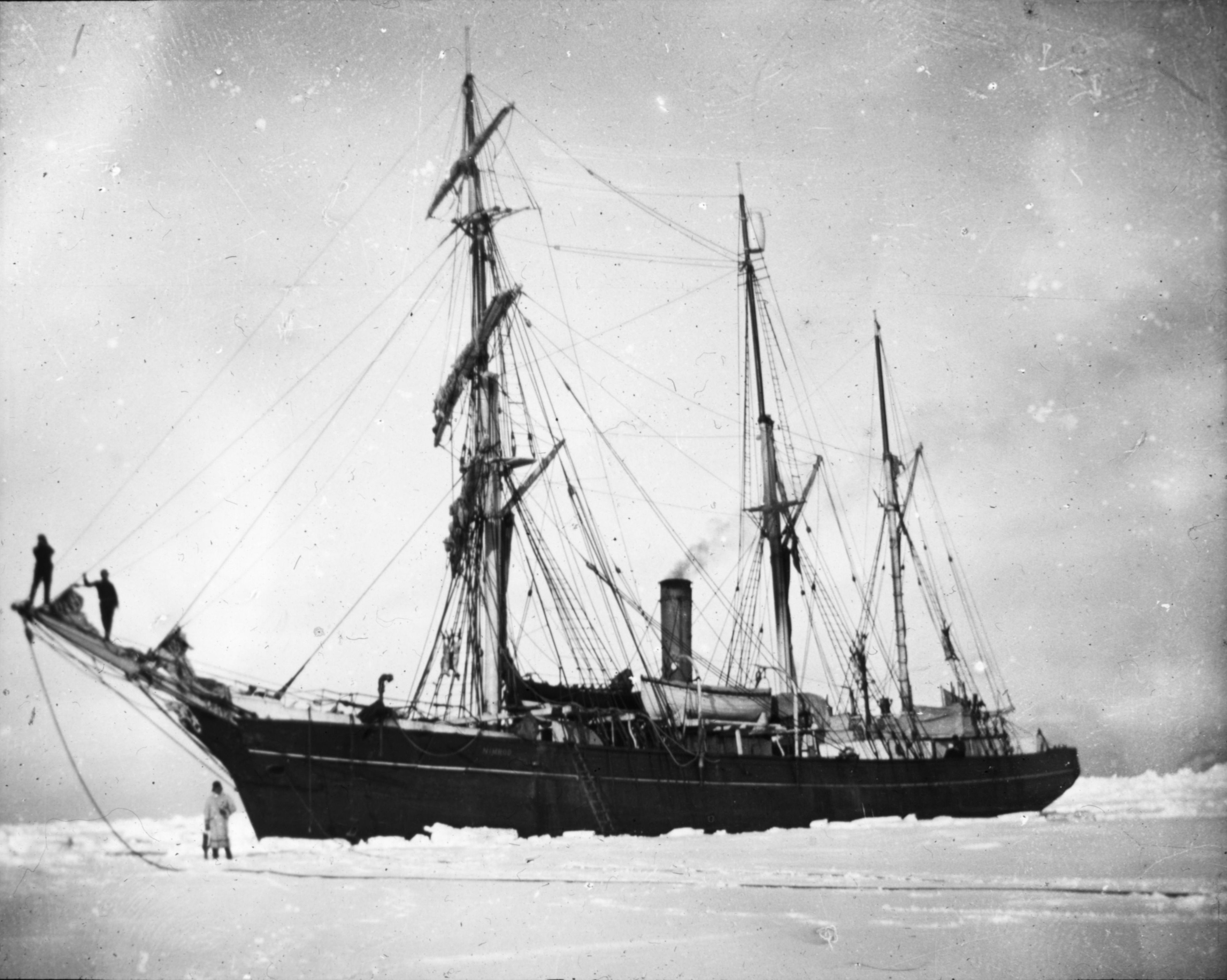
- Nimrod in Antarctic ice in 1908

History
- Name: Nimrod
- Namesake: Nimrod
- Owner: 1867: Thomas Job; 1888: Job Brothers; 1907: William Beardmore; 1911: Sir Ernest Shackleton; 1913: Roland Webster; 1918: The SS Nimrod Ltd
- Operator: 1918: Emile Dickers
- Port of registry: 1867: Liverpool; 1889: St John's, Newfoundland; 1907: London; 1913: London
- Builder: A Stephen & Sons, Dundee
- Yard number: 36
- Launched: 6 December 1866
- Completed: January 1867
- Refit: re-engined 1889; converted to exploration ship 1907
- Identification: UK official number 55047; 1889: code letters KWVT; 1918: code letters JNFD
- Fate: grounded and broke up, 1919

General characteristics
- Type: whaler and seal hunter
- Tonnage: 334 GRT, 227 NRT
- Length: 136.0 ft (41.5 m)
- Beam: 26.9 ft (8.2 m)
- Depth: 16.0 ft (4.9 m)
- Decks: 2
- Installed power: 1867: 50 hp; 1891: 60 rhp
- Propulsion: single screw; 1891: compound steam engine
- Sail plan: 1867: three-masted schooner; by 1874: re-rigged as barquentine
- Speed: 6 knots (11 km/h) under steam
- Crew: 1919: 12

Nimrod was a wooden-hulled, three-masted sailing ship with auxiliary steam engine that was built in Scotland in 1867 as a whaler. She was the ship with which Ernest Shackleton made his Nimrod Expedition to Antarctica in 1908–09. After the expedition she returned to commercial service, and in 1919 she was wrecked in the North Sea with the loss of ten members of her crew.

The ship was named Nimrod after the biblical Nimrod.

== Building and registration ==
Alexander Stephen and Sons built Nimrod in Dundee. She was launched on 6 December 1866, and completed in January 1867. Her registered length was 136.0 ft (41.5 m), her beam was 26.9 ft (8.2 m) and her depth was 16.0 ft (4.9 m). Her tonnages were 334 GRT and 227 NRT. She was rigged as a schooner. She had a single screw, driven by a 50 hp steam engine built by Gourlay Brothers of Dundee.

Her principal owner was Thomas B Job, who registered her at Liverpool. Her United Kingdom official number was 55047. They used her for whaling and seal hunting.

By 1874 Nimrod was rigged as a barquentine. By 1888 her owners were listed as Job Brothers. By 1889 she had the code letters KWVT, and in that year Job Brothers re-registered her in St John's, Newfoundland. By 1891 her original engine had been replaced by a two-cylinder compound engine built by Westray, Copeland & Co of Barrow-in-Furness. It was rated at 60 hp and gave her a speed of only 6 knots (11 km/h).

== Nimrod expedition ==
In 1907 the shipbuilder William Beardmore bought Nimrod and re-registered her in London as a yacht to serve as Shackleton's expedition ship. The purchase price was £5,000. She was in poor condition, needing caulking and renewal of her masts. In June 1907 she reached London, where she was overhauled.

King Edward VII and Queen Alexandra visited the ship, and on 11 August she left for Antarctica, captained by Rupert England. She sailed via Australia and New Zealand, and on 1 January 1908 she left New Zealand for the Southern Ocean. To conserve coal in Nimrod's limited bunkers, the Union Steam Ship Company cargo steamship Koonya towed her as far as the Antarctic Circle, a distance of about 1,400 nautical miles (2,600 km). The Union Company Chairman Sir James Mills and the New Zealand Government each paid half the cost of the tow. From 14 January Nimrod continued under her own power.

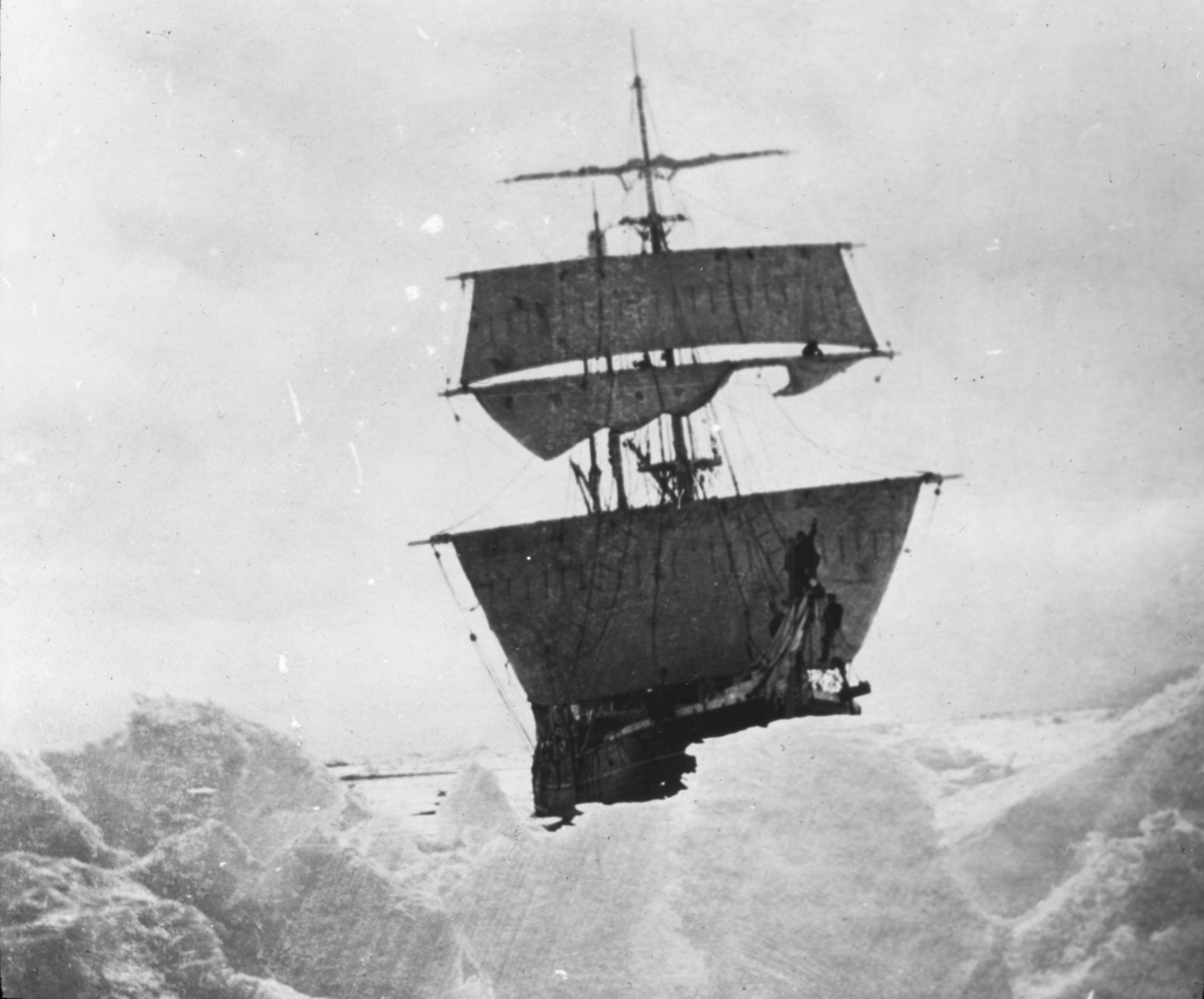
Nimrod in ice in Antarctica in 1908

On 29 January 1908 Nimrod reached McMurdo Sound on 3 February she reached Cape Royds, where she landed Shackleton's equipment and expedition team. Shackleton became dissatisfied with Captain England, who often moved Nimrod away from shore when he feared the sea ice was unsafe. On 22 February she finished unloading and left for New Zealand, leaving Shackleton's party ashore to make their expedition.

Shackleton had Captain England replaced by Frederick Pryce Evans, who had captained Koonya when she towed Nimrod south in January 1908. In January 1909 Evans brought Nimrod back to Antarctica to rendezvous with the returning expedition team, which Shackleton had split into parties, each with its own objective. The "Northern Party" had explored Victoria Land, and on 2 February 1909 reached its arranged rendezvous point to meet the ship, but heavy drifting snow prevented Nimrod's lookouts from seeing the Northern Party's camp. She continued to the Ferrar Glacier, where she picked up a three-man party who had been doing geological work. She then returned, and two days later succeeded in finding and re-embarking the Northern Party.

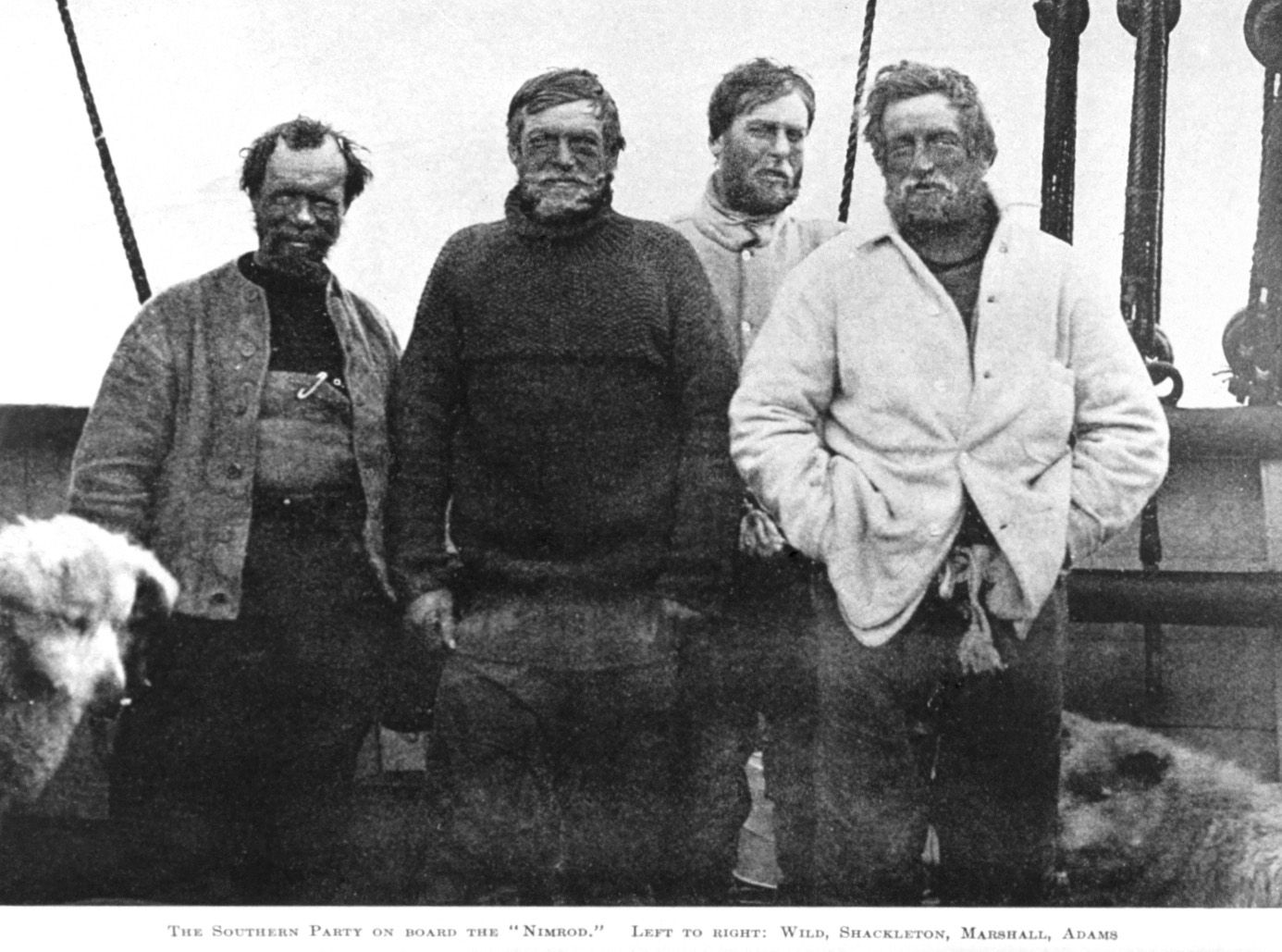
Frank Wild, Ernest Shackleton, Eric Marshall and Jameson Adams, members of the Southern Party, aboard Nimrod after re-embarking in March 1909

Nimrod then anchored off the Erebus Glacier Tongue, and between 28 February and 4 March re-embarked Shackleton's "Southern Party", who had made the first successful ascent of Mount Erebus and had unsuccessfully tried to reach the South Pole. She had now re-embarked all of Shackleton's team and left Antarctica, reaching New Zealand on 23 March 1909. Shackleton's team named some features of Antarctica's geography after the ship, including the Nimrod Glacier.

== Later career and loss ==
By 1911 Shackleton owned Nimrod. In 1911 her owner became Roland V Webster. By 1917 her owner was The SS Nimrod Ltd, her manager was an Emile Dickers, and her code letters were JNFD.

In January 1919 Nimrod, commanded by a Captain Doran left Blyth, Northumberland with a cargo of coal for Calais. On the night of 29–30 January she ran aground on the Barber Sands off Caister-on-Sea, Norfolk. Her engine room flooded, killing her chief engineer. Her remaining 11 crew sheltered under her bridge. They fired distress flares, which were seen ashore. The Caister lifeboat tried to reach her, but was unsuccessful. Nimrod's crew launched her lifeboat, but the heavy sea capsized it. After six hours the boat was driven ashore, with two survivors clinging to it.

The bodies of seven of her crew were washed ashore. Captain Doran’s body was found north of Caister. Five bodies were found between Gorleston-on-Sea and Hopton-on-Sea, and one was found at California.

== See also ==
List of Antarctic exploration ships from the Heroic Age, 1897–1922

== Bibliography ==
- Huntford, Roland (1985). Shackleton. London: Hodder & Stoughton. ISBN 978-0-340-25007-5. OCLC 13108800.
- Lloyd's Register of British and Foreign Shipping. London: Lloyd's Register of Shipping. 1874 – via Internet Archive.
- Universal Register. London: Lloyd's Register of Shipping. 1888 – via Internet Archive.
- Lloyd's Register of British and Foreign Shipping. Vol. I–Steamers. London: Lloyd's Register of Shipping. 1891 – via Internet Archive.
- Lloyd's Register of British and Foreign Shipping. Vol. I–Steamers. London: Lloyd's Register of Shipping. 1907 – via Internet Archive.
- Lloyd's Register of Shipping. Vol. II–Steamers. London: Lloyd's Register of Shipping. 1917 – via Internet Archive.
- Mercantile Navy List. London. 1868 – via Crew List Index Project.
- Mercantile Navy List. London. 1889 – via Crew List Index Project.
- Mercantile Navy List. London. 1890 – via Crew List Index Project.
- Mercantile Navy List. London. 1910 – via Crew List Index Project.
- Mercantile Navy List. London. 1911 – via Crew List Index Project.
- Mercantile Navy List. London. 1914 – via Crew List Index Project.
- Mercantile Navy List. London. 1918 – via Crew List Index Project.
- Paine, Lincoln P (2000). Ships of Discovery and Exploration. Boston: Houghton Mifflin Harcourt. p. 102. ISBN 978-0-395-98415-4.
- Riffenburgh, Beau (2004). Nimrod: Ernest Shackleton and the Extraordinary Story of the 1907–09 British Antarctic Expedition. London: Bloomsbury Publishing. pp. 306–7. ISBN 0-7475-7253-4.
- Shackleton, Ernest (1911). The Heart of the Antarctic. London: William Heinemann.
