= Eric Marshall =

British Antarctic explorer (1879–1963)

Lieutenant Colonel Eric Marshall CBE MC
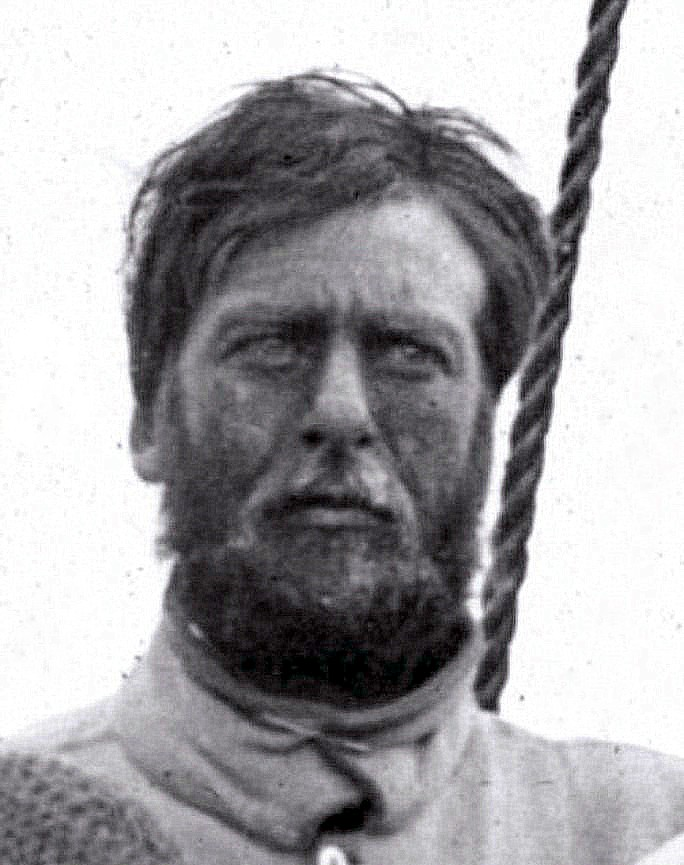
- Marshall in 1908
- Born: 29 May 1879; Hampstead, Surrey, England
- Died: 26 February 1963 (aged 83)
- Education: Monkton Combe School; Emmanuel College, Cambridge; St Bartholomew's Hospital
- Occupations: Army doctor; explorer
- Military career
- Allegiance: United Kingdom
- Branch: British Army
- Rank: Lieutenant Colonel
- Units: Royal Army Medical Corps; British North Russian Expeditionary Force
- Conflicts: First World War; Second World War
- Awards: CBE; Order of St Stanislaus; Mentioned in dispatches

Lieutenant Colonel Eric Marshall CBE MC (29 May 1879 – 26 February 1963) was a British Army doctor and Antarctic explorer with the Nimrod Expedition led by Ernest Shackleton in 1907–09, and was one of the party of four men (Marshall, Shackleton, Jameson Adams and Frank Wild) who reached Furthest South at 88°23′S 162°00′E on 9 January 1909.

== Biography ==
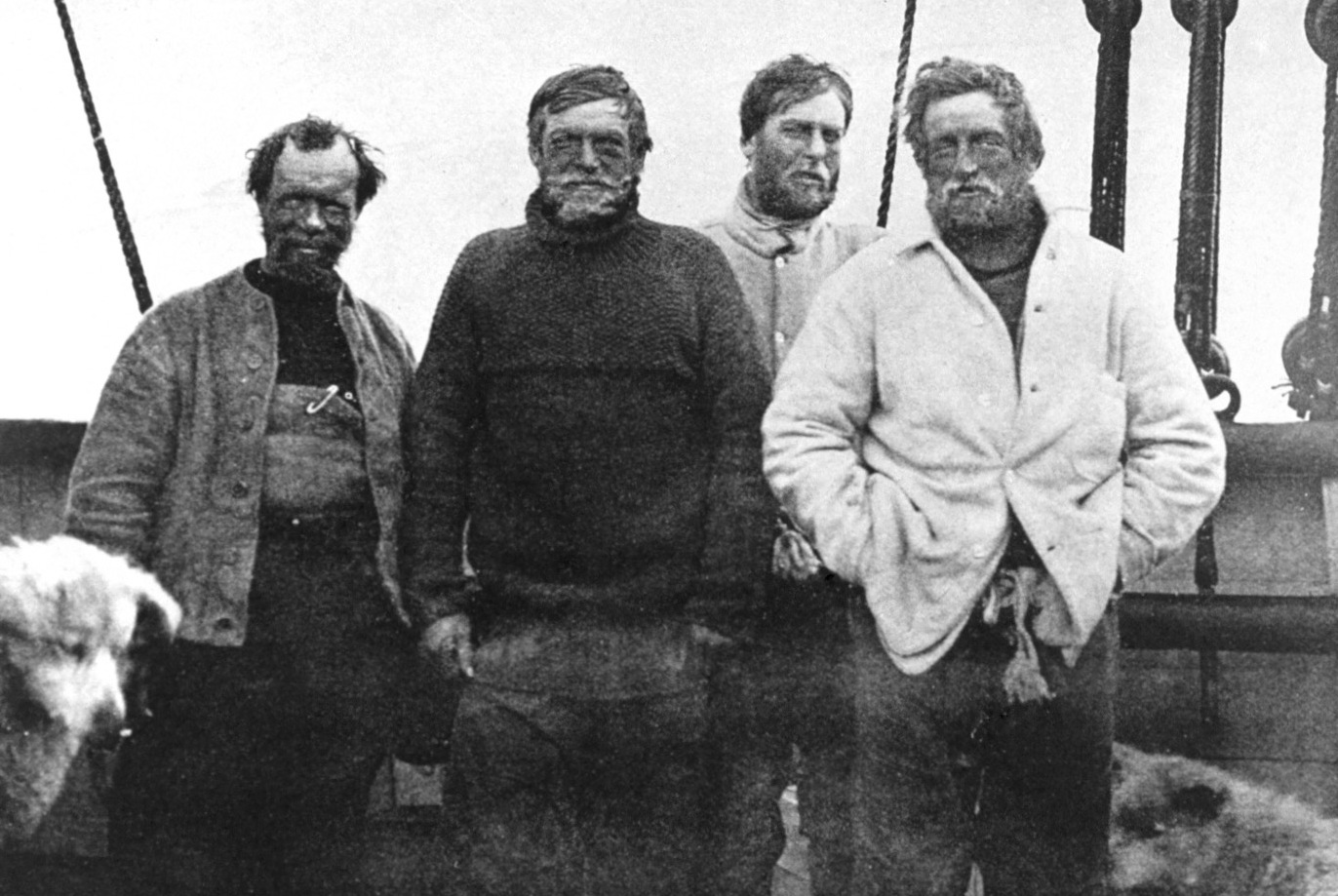
Nimrod Expedition South Pole Party (left to right): Wild, Shackleton, Marshall and Adams

Born in Hampstead, Surrey, on 29 May 1879, he was educated at Monkton Combe School, Bath and at Emmanuel College, Cambridge, before qualifying as a surgeon from St Bartholomew's Hospital. Marshall met Shackleton in 1906 at a house party in London. Shackleton told him about the proposed expedition to the South Pole and suggested Marshall go on a training course on surveying and then he could become the expedition's surgeon, surveyor and cartographer as well as the principal photographer.

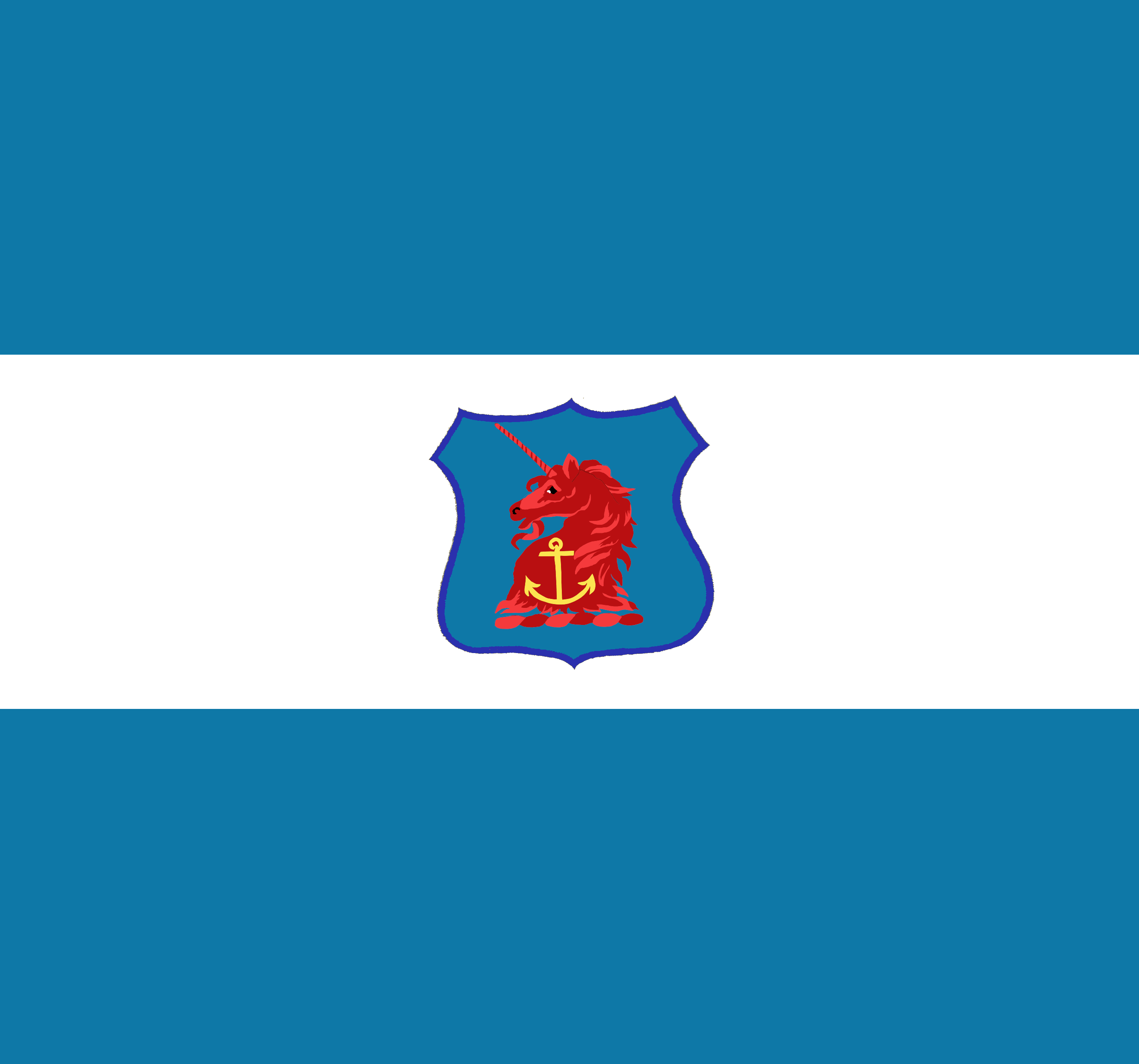
Sledge flag used by Marshall in Antarctica during the Nimrod Expedition

According to Leif Mills, who has written about the two men in Polar Friction: the relationship between Marshall and Shackleton, 2012, Marshall was "an indispensable member of Shackleton's expedition; yet on the voyage down from New Zealand to Antarctica, during the long Antarctic winter at their base at Cape Royds and on the actual southern journey, Marshall constantly criticised Shackleton in his diary, sometimes in almost vitriolic language, and seemed to have nothing but contempt for him." Marshall maintained his criticism of Shackleton throughout his life, referring to him as 'the biggest mountebank of the century' in one letter held at the Royal Geographical Society dated 30 August 1956.

Marshall joined the Royal Army Medical Corps and was commissioned as a second lieutenant in April 1915. He was mentioned in despatches by Sir Douglas Haig, Commander in Chief of the British Armies in France and Flanders in April 1916 for service at Ypres and for service at the Somme in May 1917. He was awarded the Military Cross in January 1918. By the end of the First World War he had attained the rank of acting major.

In autumn 1918, Marshall was posted to Archangel in northern Russia as a member of the British North Russian Expeditionary Force, serving as a senior medical officer at Archangel. For his services there he was appointed Commander of the Order of the British Empire and awarded the Russian Order of St Stanislaus.

Marshall married Enid in 1922. In the 1930s the family moved to Kenya, where he practised farming for a few years before returning to England. During the Second World War, Marshall rejoined the Royal Army Medical Corps and achieved the rank of lieutenant-colonel.

After the War ended, Marshall joined the Ministry of Pensions as a medical officer. When he retired he and his wife moved to Yarmouth in the Isle of Wight. He died on 26 February 1963.
