= James Murray (biologist) =

British biologist and explorer (1865–1914)

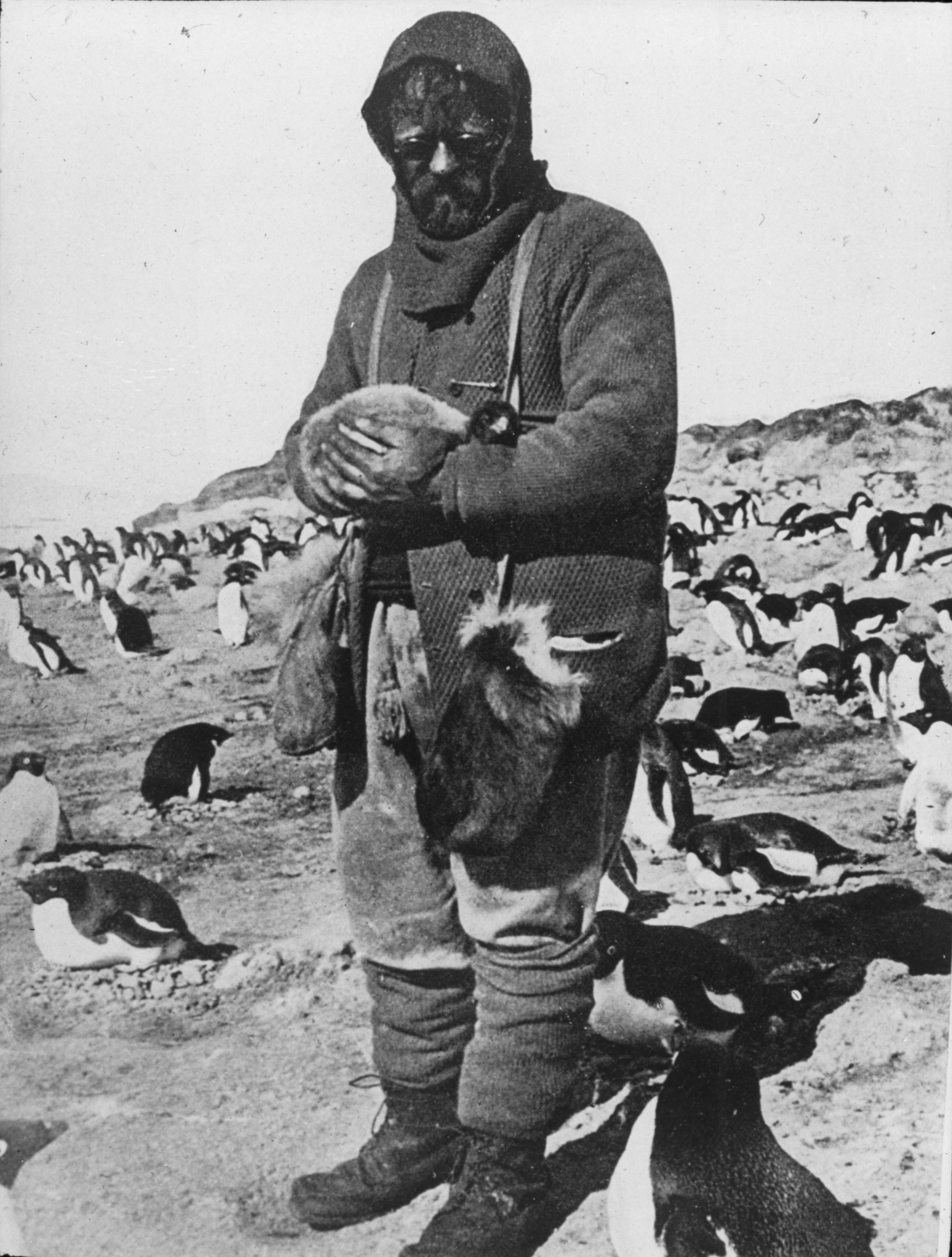
James Murray with Adélie Penguin chick (Nimrod-Expedition)

Dr James Murray FRSE (21 July 1865 – disappeared February 1914) was a Scottish biologist and explorer.

== Early life and education ==
He was born at 50 Charlotte Street in Glasgow, the son of William Murray, a grocer, and his wife, Janet McMurray. He studied zoology at Glasgow University and took art classes at Glasgow School of Art.

== Career ==
In 1902, he assisted the oceanographer Sir John Murray with a bathymetric survey of Scottish freshwater lochs. James Murray undertook both biological and bathymetric surveys. In particular, he made important contributions to tardigrade and bdelloid rotifer science, describing 113 species and forms of rotifer and 66 species of tardigrade.

In July 1907, he was elected a Fellow of the Royal Society of Edinburgh. His proposers were Sir John Murray, George Chrystal, James Burgess and Thomas Nicol Johnston. He was awarded the Society's Neil Prize for the period 1909–1911.

In 1907, at the age of 41, he served under Ernest Shackleton on the Nimrod Expedition to Antarctica, where he was in charge of the base camp. In 1913, he co-wrote a book about the expedition, titled Antarctic Days, with George Edward Marston (1882–1940), a fellow member of the expedition.

In 1911, aged 46, he joined Percy Fawcett, Henry Costin and Henry Manley in an expedition led by Fawcett to explore and chart the jungle in the region of the Peru–Bolivia border. Murray, unused to the rigours of the tropics, fared poorly, becoming severely ill with fever and infected wounds. Eventually Fawcett diverted the expedition to get Murray out, such was his condition. Murray left the jungle with a local settler and then briefly dropped out of sight while he recovered in a house in Tambopata. He reached La Paz in 1912, learning that he was thought to have died.

Murray, angry at perceived mistreatment at Fawcett's hands, wanted to sue. However, friends at the Royal Geographical Society advised him against it.

== Final expedition and disappearance ==
In June 1913, he joined a Canadian scientific expedition to the Arctic aboard the ill-fated Karluk as oceanographer. The ship became trapped in the Arctic ice in August 1913. Eventually, Murray and three others, dissatisfied with Captain Robert Bartlett's leadership, decided to try to reach safety on their own, and, after signing a letter absolving the captain of responsibility and after receiving supplies from him, they departed across the ice on February 5 to try to reach Wrangel Island or Herald Island. They were last seen experiencing major difficulties a few days later by three people returning from another mission (ship's steward Ernest Chafe, and two Inuit, Kataktovik and Kuraluk), but they refused to return to the ship. The only subsequent hint of their fate was a sailor's scarf belonging to one of them (seaman Stanley Morris), later found buried in an ice floe.

Murray, aged 49, and his three companions are presumed to have died in the Arctic in February 1914.

== Personal life ==
In 1892, he married Mary Lyall.

== In popular culture ==
=== Film ===
- Murray was portrayed by Angus Macfadyen in the 2016 film The Lost City of Z in relation to his South American trip.

== Works ==
- Murray, J., 1905. The Tardigrada of the Scottish Lochs. Trans. R. Soc. Edinb., 41: 677 - 698
- Murray, J., 1905. Microscopic life of St. Kilda. Ann. Scott. Nat. Hist., 54: 94 - 96
- Murray, J., 1905. The Tardigrada of the Forth Valley. Ann. Scott. Nat. Hist., 55: 160 - 164
- Murray, J., 1906. The Tardigrada of the Forth Valley. Part II. Ann. Scott. Nat. Hist., 60: 214 - 217
- Murray, J., 1906. Scottish National Antarctic Expedition: Tardigrada of the South Orkneys. Trans. Roy. Soc. Edinb., 45: 323 - 339
- Murray, J., 1906. Scottish Alpine Tardigrada. Ann. Scott. Nat. Hist., 57: 25 - 30
- Murray, J., 1906. Scottish Alpine Tardigrada. Ann. Scott. Nat. Hist., 60: 214 - 217
- Murray, J., 1907. Water-bears or Tardigrada. Quekett Micr. Club, 10: 55 - 70
- Murray, J., 1907. Arctic Tardigrada, collected by Wm. S. Bruce. Transactions of the Royal Society of Edinburgh, 45: 669 - 681
- Murray, J., 1907. Some Tardigrada of the Sikkim Himalaya. J. Roy. Microsc. Soc., 1907: 269 - 273
- Murray, J., 1907. Encystment of Tardigrada. Trans. R. Soc. Edinb., 45: 837 - 854
- Murray, J., 1907. Some South African Tardigrada. J. R. Micr. Soc. London, 5: 515 - 524
- Murray, J., 1907. Some Tardigrada from the Sikkim Himalaya, Journ. R. Micr. Soc., pt. 3: 269 - 273, pl. 14
- Murray, J., 1907. The encystment of Macrobiotus. The Zoologist, 11: 4 - 11
- Murray, J., 1907. Scottish Tardigrada collected by the Lake Survey. Trans. Roy. Soc. Edinburgh, 45: 641 - 668
- Murray, J., 1910. Tardigrada. British Antarctic Expedition 1907 - 1909. Reports on the Scientific Investigations. Vol. 1 Biology (Part V): 83 - 187 (plates 14 - 21)
- Murray, J., 1910. Canadian Tardigrada. In Report for the Scientific Investigation of the British Antarctic Expedition 1907 - 1909. Volume I. London: 158 - 178
- Murray, J., 1911. Water-bears or Tardigrada. J. Quekett Micr. Club., 11: 181 - 198
- Murray, J., 1911. Arctiscoida. Proc. R. Ir. Acad., 31: 1 - 16
- Murray, J., 1911. Scottish Tardigrada, a review of our present knowledge. Ann. Scott. Nat. Hist., 78: 88 - 95
- Murray, J., 1911. Clare Island Survey: Arctiscoidea. Proc. Roy. Irish Acad., Dublin, 31: 1 - 16
- Murray, J., 1913. African Tardigrada. J. R. Micr. Soc. London, pt. 2: 136 - 144
- Murray, J., 1913. Notes on the Natural History of Bolivia and Peru. Scottish Oceanogr. Lab., Edinburgh: 1 - 45 (Tardigrada, pp. 28 – 30)
