= List of glaciers of Victoria Land =

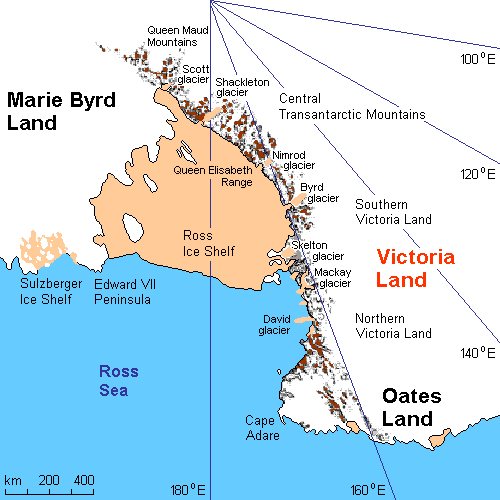
Area map of Victoria Land

Following is a list of glaciers of Victoria Land in Antarctica. This list may not reflect recently named glaciers in Victoria Land.

== Asgard Range ==
- Alberich Glacier
- Bartley Glacier
- Beowulf Glacier
- Commonwealth Glacier
- Conrow Glacier
- Decker Glacier
- Ferguson Glacier
- Fountain Glacier
- Godwit Glacier
- Heimdall Glacier
- Hollingsworth Glacier
- Meserve Glacier
- Mime Glacier
- Newall Glacier
- Norris Glacier
- Nylen Glacier
- Repeater Glacier
- Schlatter Glacier
- Sykes Glacier
- Valhalla Glacier
- Wright Lower Glacier
- Wright Upper Glacier

== Victoria Land ==
- Abbott Spur
- Adams Glacier
- Aeronaut Glacier
- Aiken Glacier
- Airdevronsix Icefalls
- Albrecht Penck Glacier
- Allison Glacier
- Alt Glacier
- Alvarez Glacier
- Amos Glacier
- Amphitheatre Glacier
- Anderton Glacier
- Anu Whakatoro Glacier
- Argonaut Glacier
- Arneb Glacier
- Arruiz Glacier
- Astakhov Glacier
- Astapenko Glacier
- Astronaut Glacier
- Atka Glacier
- Atkinson Glacier
- Aviator Glacier
- Bachtold Glacier
- Backstairs Passage Glacier
- Baker Glacier
- Ball Glacier
- Barber Glacier
- Barnett Glacier
- Bates Glacier
- Baxter Glacier
- Beaman Glacier
- Benson Glacier
- Biker Glacier
- Bindschadler Glacier
- Black Glacier
- Blackwelder Glacier
- Blankenship Glacier
- Blue Glacier
- Bol Glacier
- Bonne Glacier
- Boomerang Glacier
- Borchgrevink Glacier
- Bornmann Glacier
- Borns Glacier
- Bowden Glacier
- Bowers Glacier
- Bowers Piedmont Glacier
- Boyer Glacier
- Bridgman Glacier
- Bryan Glacier
- Burnette Glacier
- Burns Glacier
- Burrows Glacier
- Calkin Glacier
- Cambridge Glacier
- Campbell Glacier
- Canada Glacier
- Canham Glacier
- Capsize Glacier
- Carleton Glacier
- Carnein Glacier
- Carryer Glacier
- Cassidy Glacier
- Cassini Glacier
- Catspaw Glacier
- Cerberus Glacier
- Champness Glacier
- Chapman Glacier
- Chattahoochee Glacier
- Chinn Glacier
- Chugunov Glacier
- Church Glacier
- Clark Glacier
- Clarke Glacier
- Clausnitzer Glacier
- Cleveland Glacier
- Clio Glacier
- Co-pilot Glacier
- Comberiate Glacier
- Commanda Glacier
- Condit Glacier
- Coral Sea Glacier
- Corner Glacier
- Cosmonaut Glacier
- Cosmonette Glacier
- Cotton Glacier
- Coulston Glacier
- Covert Glacier
- Cracktrack Glacier
- Crawford Glacier
- Creagh Glacier
- Crescent Glacier
- Crisp Glacier
- Croll Glacier
- Crume Glacier
- Cycle Glacier
- Dahe Glacier
- Darkowski Glacier
- David Glacier
- Davis Glacier
- DeAngelo Glacier
- Debenham Glacier
- Delinski Glacier
- Deming Glacier
- Dennistoun Glacier
- Denton Glacier
- Descent Glacier
- DeWald Glacier
- Dewdrop Glacier
- Discovery Glacier
- Doran Glacier
- Double Curtain Glacier
- Dromedary Glacier
- Drygalski Ice Tongue
- Dugdale Glacier
- Dun Glacier
- Dunn Glacier
- Ebbe Glacier
- Edisto Glacier
- Edwards Glacier
- Egeberg Glacier
- Elder Glacier
- Emmanuel Glacier
- Enyo Glacier
- Eos Glacier
- Evans Piedmont Glacier
- Evison Glacier
- Falkner Glacier
- Fendley Glacier
- Fenwick Glacier
- Fenwick Ice Piedmont
- Ferrar Glacier
- Ferrigno Glacier
- Finley Glacier
- Fireman Glacier
- Fitch Glacier
- Fitzgerald Glacier
- Foolsmate Glacier
- Fortenberry Glacier
- Foster Glacier
- Fowlie Glacier
- Frank Newnes Glacier
- Frazier Glacier
- Freimanis Glacier
- Fritter Glacier
- Fry Glacier
- Gabites Glacier
- Gair Glacier
- Gannutz Glacier
- Garwood Glacier
- Gauss Glacier
- Gentle Glacier
- Geodetic Glacier
- Geoid Glacier
- George Glacier
- Glee Glacier
- Glezen Glacier
- Glimpse Glacier
- Goldman Glacier
- Goodspeed Glacier
- Gran Glacier
- Graveson Glacier
- Greenwell Glacier
- Gressitt Glacier
- Griffiths Glacier
- Gruendler Glacier
- Haffner Glacier
- Harbord Glacier
- Harbour Glacier
- Harlin Glacier
- Harp Glacier
- Harper Glacier
- Hart Glacier
- Haselton Glacier
- Hearfield Glacier
- Hedblom Glacier
- Hedley Glacier
- Helfferich Glacier
- Helman Glacier
- Herbertson Glacier
- Hobbs Glacier
- Holystone Slope
- Honeycomb Glacier
- Hooker Glacier
- Horne Glacier
- Hoshko Glacier
- Houliston Glacier
- Howard Glacier
- Howchin Glacier
- Hughes Glacier
- Huka Kapo Glacier
- Hunt Glacier
- Hunter Glacier
- Icebreaker Glacier
- Ironside Glacier
- Irving Glacier
- Irwin Glacier
- Jezek Glacier
- Johnstone Glacier
- Joyce Glacier
- Jutland Glacier
- Kamb Glacier
- Kelly Glacier
- Kempe Glacier
- Kennedy Glacier
- Kirk Glacier
- Kirkby Glacier
- Kitticarrara Glacier
- Koettlitz Glacier
- Lacroix Glacier
- Lann Glacier
- Larsen Glacier
- Leander Glacier
- Leap Year Glacier
- Lensen Glacier
- Lillie Glacier
- Linder Glacier
- Lister Glacier
- Lobeck Glacier
- Loftus Glacier
- Lovejoy Glacier
- Ludvig Glacier
- Lugger Glacier
- McCann Glacier
- McDermott Glacier
- McElroy Glacier
- Mackay Glacier
- McKellar Glacier
- MacKinnon Glacier
- McLean Glacier
- McLin Glacier
- McMahon Glacier
- Man-o-War Glacier
- Manhaul Glacier
- Marchetti Glacier
- Marin Glacier
- Mariner Glacier
- Marr Glacier
- Marston Glacier
- Massey Glacier
- Matataua Glacier
- Matterhorn Glacier
- Mawson Glacier
- Meander Glacier
- Midship Glacier
- Midway Glacier
- Miers Glacier
- Miller Glacier
- Mitchell Glacier
- Moa Glacier
- Mollweide Glacier
- Montecchi Glacier
- Montigny Glacier
- Morley Glacier
- Moubray Glacier
- Moubray Piedmont Glacier
- Müller Glacier
- Murray Glacier
- Nameless Glacier
- Nansen Ice Sheet
- Nascent Glacier
- Nash Glacier
- New Glacier
- Newnes Glacier
- Nielsen Glacier
- Northwind Glacier
- O'Hara Glacier
- O'Kane Glacier
- Oakley Glacier
- Oates Piedmont Glacier
- Odin Glacier
- Olson Glacier
- Ommanney Glacier
- Orestes Glacier
- Orr Glacier
- Osuga Glacier
- Overflow Glacier
- Packard Glacier
- Palais Glacier
- Parker Glacier
- Pascoe Glacier
- Pearl Harbor Glacier
- Pilot Glacier
- Pipecleaner Glacier
- Pitkevitch Glacier
- Pitzman Glacier
- Plane Table Glacier
- Plata Glacier
- Plummet Glacier
- Ponganis Icefall
- Potter Glacier
- Potts Glacier
- Priddy Glacier
- Priestley Glacier
- Pryor Glacier
- Pūanu Glacier
- Pyne Glacier
- Radian Glacier
- Rainey Glacier
- Rastorfer Glacier
- Rastorguev Glacier
- Rawle Glacier
- Rebuff Glacier
- Recoil Glacier
- Reeves Glacier
- Renegar Glacier
- Rennick Glacier
- Reusch Glacier
- Rhone Glacier
- Ridgeway Glacier
- Rim Glacier
- Ringer Glacier
- Rivard Glacier
- Robertson Glacier
- Robson Glacier
- Rotunda Glacier
- Rowles Glacier
- Salient Glacier
- Schultz Glacier
- Scott Keltie Glacier
- Scrivener Glacier
- Scudding Glacier
- Seafarer Glacier
- Serrat Glacier
- Shark Fin Glacier
- Sharpend Glacier
- Sheehan Glacier
- Shipley Glacier
- Shoemaker Glacier
- Simpson Glacier
- Simpson Glacier Tongue
- Sledgers Glacier
- Slone Glacier
- Smithson Glacier
- Sollas Glacier
- Solomon Glacier
- South America Glacier
- Spring Glacier
- Sprocket Glacier
- Stafford Glacier
- Staircase Glacier
- Stocking Glacier
- Styx Glacier
- Suess Glacier
- Summers Glacier
- Suter Glacier
- Suvorov Glacier
- Svendsen Glacier
- Swanson Glacier
- Taylor Glacier
- Tedrow Glacier
- Telemeter Glacier
- Tinker Glacier
- Tocci Glacier
- Topside Glacier
- Towle Glacier
- Towles Glacier
- Trafalgar Glacier
- Trainer Glacier
- Tripp Ice Tongue
- Tucker Glacier
- Tyler Glacier
- Upper Jaw Glacier
- Upper Victoria Glacier
- Vacchi Piedmont Glacier
- Van Loon Glacier
- Vereyken Glacier
- Victoria Lower Glacier
- Victoria Upper Glacier
- Victoria Upper Névé
- Von Guerard Glacier
- Waddington Glacier
- Walcott Glacier
- Wales Glacier
- Walker Glacier
- Wallis Glacier
- Ward Glacier
- Warning Glacier
- Weatherwax Glacier
- Webb Glacier
- Whewell Glacier
- Whiplash Glacier
- Whitehall Glacier
- Wildwind Glacier
- Wilhelm Glacier
- Willis Glacier
- Wilson Piedmont Glacier
- Wirdnam Glacier
- Wood Glacier
- Woodberry Glacier
- Wylde Glacier
- Zenith Glacier
- Zetland Glacier
- Zoller Glacier
- Zykov Glacier
