= Chain Moraines =

Drifting moraines near Skew Peak, Antarctica

The Chain Moraines (77°11′S 160°32′E) are drifting moraines located 5 kilometres (3 mi) northwest of Skew Peak at the confluent flow of ice from Rim Glacier, Sprocket Glacier, and Mackay Glacier, including the moraines at the west side of Rim Glacier, in Victoria Land. Approved by the New Zealand Geographic Board in 1995, the name alludes to the use of a bicycle as a practical means of transportation by a New Zealand glacial mapping party led by Trevor Chinn, summer season 1992–93, and is part of a theme of cycling names in the area.
