= Raney Peak =

Mountain in Antarctica

Raney Peak (77°13′02″S 160°31′17″E) is a symmetrical peak rising to 2,050 metres (6,730 ft) between Rim Glacier and Sprocket Glacier, Victoria Land. It was named by the Advisory Committee on Antarctic Names in 2007 after Michele E. Raney, who was a physician with the 1979 winter party at Amundsen–Scott South Pole Station. She was the first female to winter at an Antarctic inland station.
