= Harbour Glacier (Victoria Land) =

Glacier in Victoria Land, Antarctica

Harbour Glacier (77°2′S 162°54′E) is a glacier flowing north from Wilson Piedmont Glacier into Granite Harbour east of the Couloir Cliffs, Victoria Land, Antarctica, where it forms the Harbour Glacier Tongue. It was named by the Advisory Committee on Antarctic Names in 2005, in association with "Harbour Ice Tongue" (now Harbour Glacier Tongue), which was named by the British Antarctic Expedition, 1910–13.
