= Biker Glacier =

Glacier in Antarctica

Biker Glacier (77°11′S 160°11′E) is a glacier, 4 kilometres (2.5 mi) long and less than 1 kilometre (0.6 mi) wide, flowing north from the polar plateau between Mount Littlepage and Mount Dearborn into Mackay Glacier, Victoria Land. Approved by New Zealand Geographic Board in 1995, the name alludes to the use of a bicycle as a practical means of transportation by a New Zealand glacial mapping party led by Trevor J. Chinn, summer season 1992–93, and is part of a theme of cycling names in the area.
