= Cape Geology =

Geographical feature in Antarctica

Coordinates: 77°00′30″S 162°34′00″E

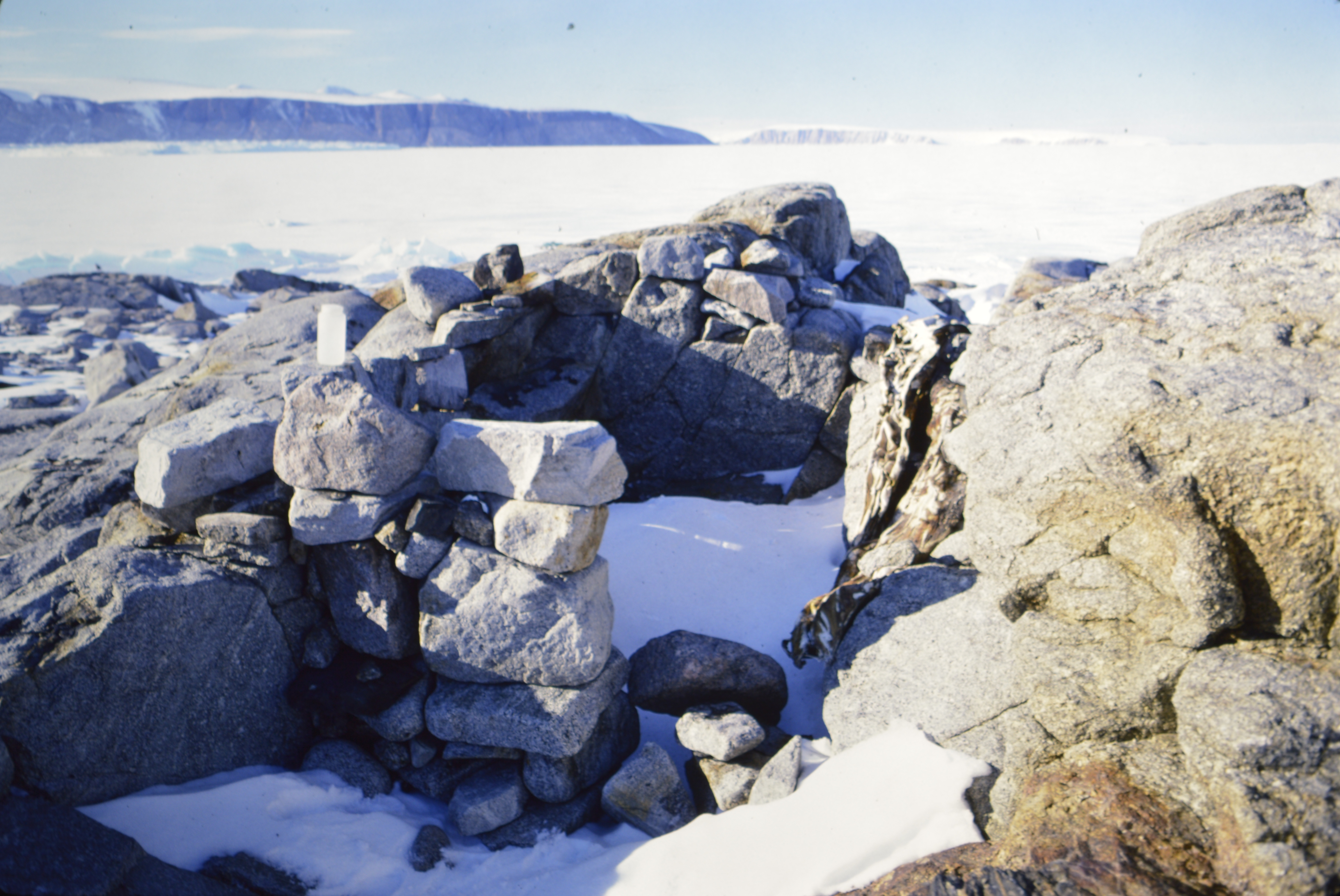
Granite House in November 1989

Cape Geology is a low, gravel-covered point marking the western limit of Botany Bay, in the southern part of Granite Harbour, Victoria Land, Antarctica. It was charted and named by the Western Geological Party of the Terra Nova Expedition (1910–13) who established their base there.

== Historic site ==
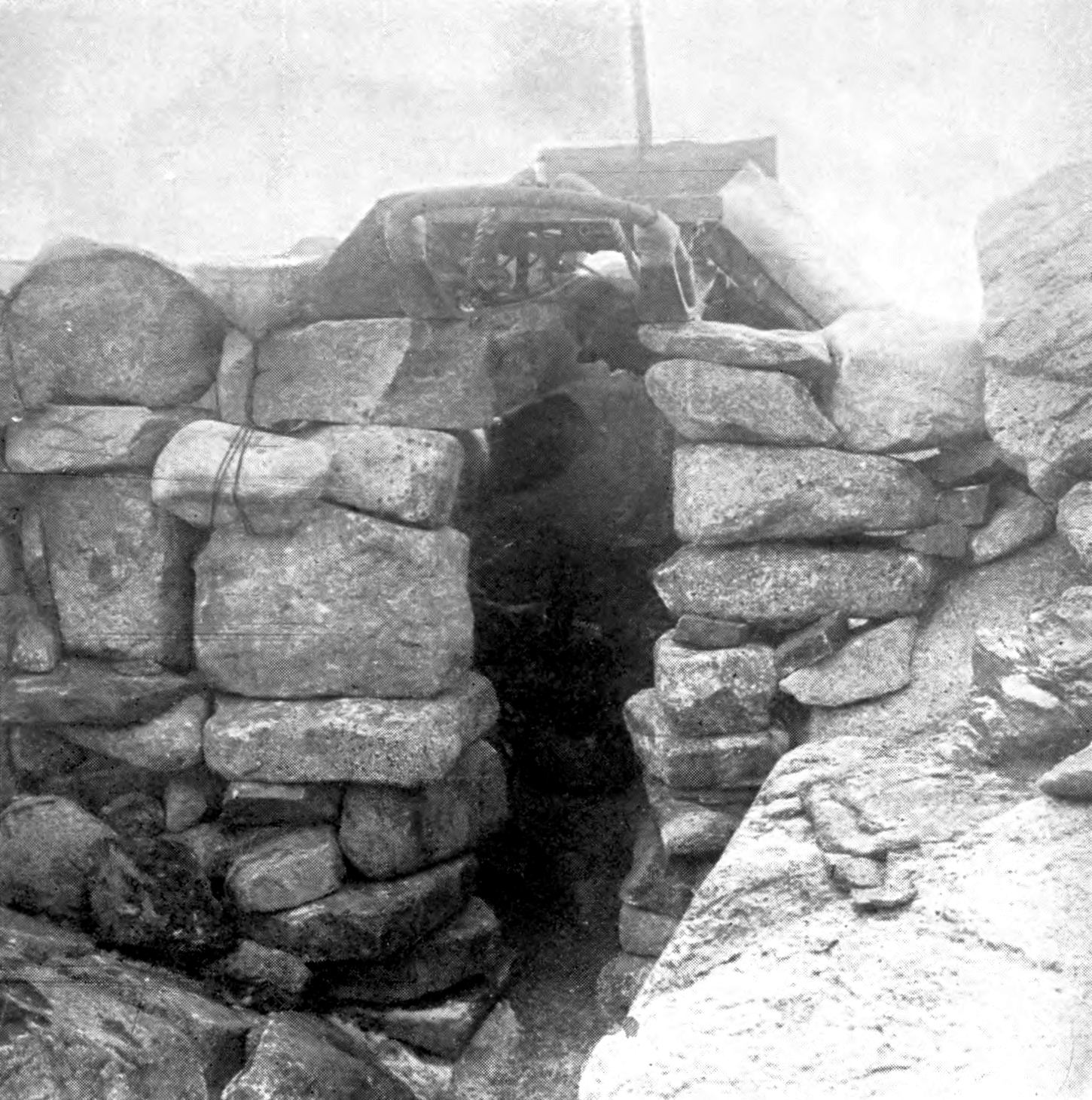
Granite House in December 1911. Robert Forde and Tryggve Gran are cooking at the blubber stove, whose chimney projects behind the sledge roof-tree.

The rock shelter known as Granite House was built in 1911, for use as a field kitchen, by Griffith Taylor's second geological excursion in the course of the Terra Nova expedition. It was enclosed on three sides with granite boulder walls and used a sled to support a sealskin roof. The stone walls of the shelter have partly collapsed. It contains the corroded remains of tins, a sealskin and some cord. The sled lies 50 m seaward of the shelter and consists of a few scattered pieces of wood, straps and buckles. The site has been designated a Historic Site or Monument (HSM 67), following a proposal by New Zealand, Norway and the United Kingdom to the Antarctic Treaty Consultative Meeting.

== Flora and fauna ==
Together, Cape Geology and Botany Bay form a botanical refuge that is exceptionally rich for such a high latitude location, with an abundance and diversity of moss and lichen species that is unique for southern Victoria Land. There are also abundant growths of algae, large populations of invertebrates (including springtails, mites, nematodes and rotifers) and a colony of over 40 pairs of south polar skuas. The area is the type locality for both the lichen Caloplaca coeruleofrigida Sochting and the collembolan Gomphiocephalus hodgsoni Carpenter. The site is protected under the Antarctic Treaty System as Antarctic Specially Protected Area (ASPA) No.154.
