= California Society of Anesthesiologists =

- Abbreviation: CSA
- Formation: 1948; 78 years ago
- Tax ID no.: 94-6076499
- Legal status: 501(c)(6) organization
- Headquarters: Sacramento, California
- President: Christina M. Menor
- Revenue: US$2,720,560 (2024)
- Expenses: US$2,545,990 (2024)
- Website: csahq.org

The California Society of Anesthesiologists (CSA), Inc., is a component society of the American Society of Anesthesiologists, Inc., in the state of California.

== History ==
CSA was founded in 1948 and incorporated in 1953 as a voluntary, non-profit association of physicians specializing in anesthesiology practicing in California. Today, the elected officers and Board of Directors are individuals dedicated to the preservation of the specialty of anesthesiology. The CSA works closely with the ASA to protect the interests of all anesthesiologists, on a national, state and local level.

== Governance ==
The CSA is governed by its House of Delegates, which is composed of CSA Delegates, district directors (designated by geographic distribution) and CSA Officers. The House of Delegates meets each year during the Society's Annual Meeting in May. During the interim between the meetings of the House of Delegates, the CSA Board of Directors exercises authority to manage the business and financial affairs of the Society, and works to implement and complement the Society's goals, consistent with the policies of the House of Delegates. The Board of Directors meets four times each year. Between meetings of the Board, the CSA Executive Committee meets to discuss specific matters which would ordinarily require special meetings of the Board.

== Notable members ==
- Michele E. Raney of the American Polar Society has been a board member of the Society.
