= Michele E. Raney =

American physician

Michele Eileen Raney
- Born: 1951 (age 74–75)
- Education: Keck School of Medicine of USC and Stanford University
- Occupations: physician and anesthesiologist
- Known for: first woman to over winter in Antarctica

Michele Eileen Raney (born 1951) is an American physician who was the first woman to over winter at an Antarctica inland station in 1979. Raney continued her association with the American Polar Society as a consultant, trainer and board member.

== Life ==
Raney attended the Keck School of Medicine at the University of Southern California where she qualified as a doctor. She practised emergency medicine before she attended Stanford University to study anesthesiology.

Raney was the first woman to over winter at an inland station in Antarctica as the physician at the Amundsen–Scott South Pole Station in 1979. The first American women to over winter in Antarctica were Mary Odile Cahoon and Mary Alice McWhinnie in 1974, although the first woman to be there in the winter was in 1947.

Raney was supported by the Oklahoma Medical Research Foundation whilst she studied the effect of isolation on the immune system over a number of years. Raney was involved for years as a consultant and in training staff for the American polar stations.

The 2,050 metre high Raney Peak in Victoria Land in Antarctica was named by the Advisory Committee on Antarctic Names (US-ACAN) in 2007 after Raney. Raney was a board member of the California Society of Anesthesiologists, the California Medical Association and the American Polar Society.

Raney was an anesthesiologist associated with PIH Health Hospital - Downey, based in Bakersfield, California, in 2020.
