= Gonville and Caius Range =

Mountain range in Antarctica

- Location within Antarctica

Highest point
- Coordinates: 77°7′S 162°16′E

Geography
- Location: Victoria Land, Antarctica

The Gonville and Caius Range (77°7′S 162°16′E) is a range of peaks, 1,000 to 1,500 metres (3,300 to 4,900 ft) high, between Mackay Glacier and Debenham Glacier in Victoria Land, Antarctica.

== Exploration and naming ==
The Gonville and Caius Range was first mapped by the British Antarctic Expedition, 1910–13, under Robert Falcon Scott, and was named for Gonville and Caius College, of Cambridge University, the alma mater of several members of the expedition.

== Location ==
The Clare Range is to the west of the Gonville and Caius Range, and Saint Johns Range to the south. Wilson Piedmont Glacier is to the east, along the coast of the Ross Sea. Mackay Glacier defines the north limit of the range. Killer Ridge, Second Facet and First Facet are to the north of Debenham Glacier and its tributary Miller Glacier. Queer Mountain is just west of Killer Ridge. The Crisp Glacier flows between the Killer Ridge and Second Facet. To the north are Mount Jensen, Red Ridge, Robson Glacier, Haystack Mountain and Mount England.

== Glaciers ==
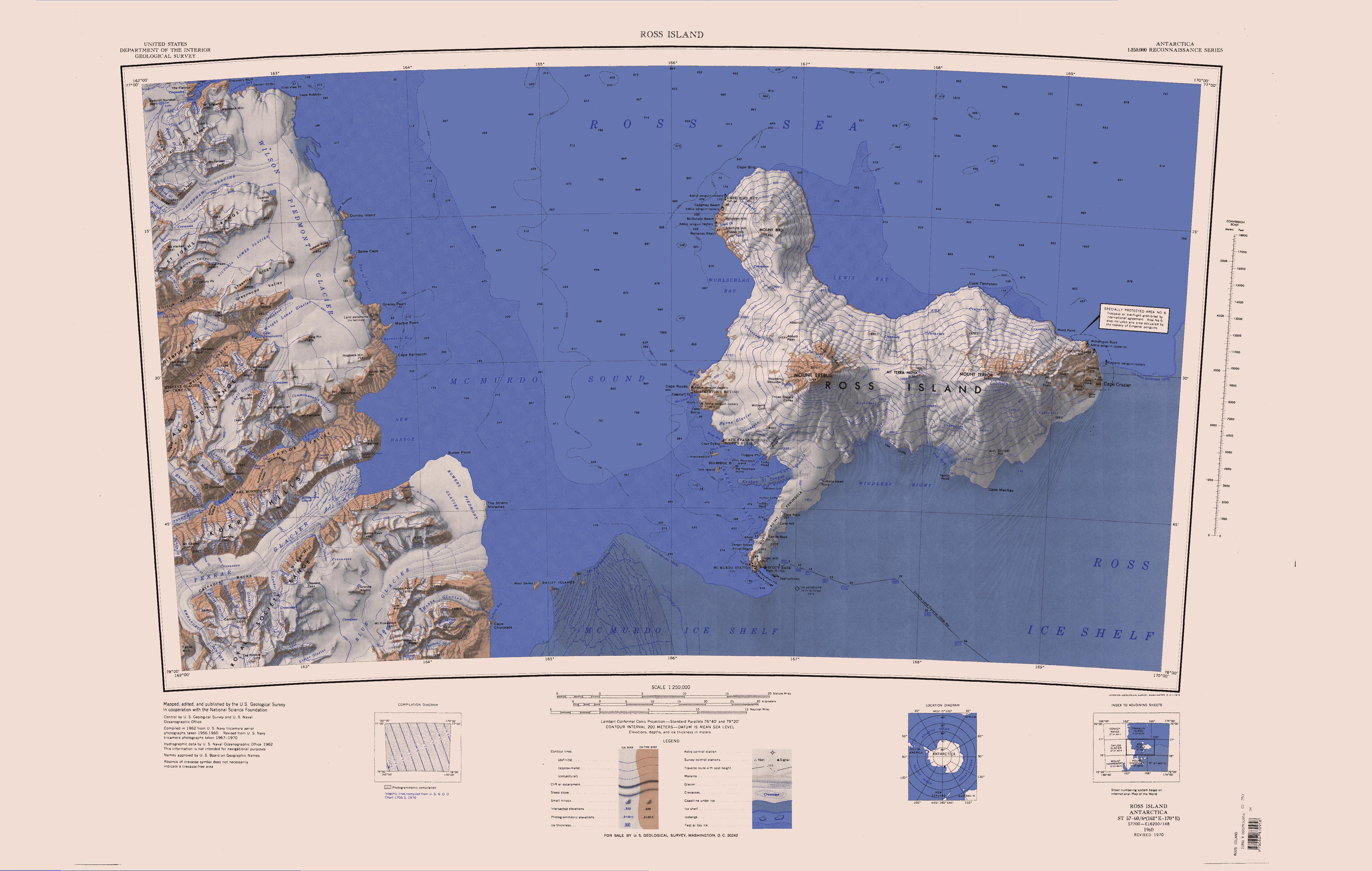
Gonville and Caius Range in northwest of map

=== Crisp Glacier ===
77°12′S 162°12′E. Glacier between Killer Ridge and Second Facet, flowing southeast into Debenham Glacier. Named by the United States Advisory Committee on Antarctic Names (US-ACAN) for Kelton W. Crisp, United States Navy, who was in charge of the electric shop at McMurdo Station, 1962.

=== Griffiths Glacier ===
77.159103°S 162.258624°E. Prominent cirque-type glacier located northeast of Crisp Glacier in Gonville and Caius Range. The feature drains east-southeast to Debenham Glacier to the east of Second Facet. Named after Harold Griffiths (d. 1974) who was associated with Antarctic exploration for over 50 years. He was instrumental in the NZ Antarctic Society's campaign to get the NZ Government to establish a presence in Antarctica.

=== Robson Glacier ===
77°05′S 162°11′E. A glacier about 3 nautical miles (5.6 km; 3.5 mi) long, which flows north from the Gonville and Caius Range along the east side of Red Ridge. It merges with the general flow of ice toward Granite Harber southward of Redcliff Nunatak. Named by the Western Journey Party, led by Taylor, of the British Antarctic Expedition, 1910-13.

=== Pyne Glacier ===
77.0666667°S 162.3°E. Glacier east of Robson Glacier in Gonville and Caius Range. Flows north and joins Mackay Glacier system southwest of The Flatiron. Named after Alex Pyne, recipient of the Polar Medal for services in Antarctic geological and in particular glacial research since 1977; currently works at Victoria University's Antarctic Research Centre in Wellington.

=== Bachtold Glacier ===
77.110809°S 161.994157°E. A glacier flowing north from Mount Chaudoin, into the lower part of Cotton Glacier. The glacier drains the broad slopes between Killer Ridge and Red Ridge. Named by US-ACAN (2007) after CE2 Harry W. Bachtold, United States Navy (United States Navy) (Seabees), who at the time was a member of the construction crew which built the original Little America V Station and the original Byrd Station in the 1955-57 pre-IGY period.

=== Fritter Glacier ===
77.131796°S 162.563555°E. A glacier between Mount Curtiss and Mount Jensen. It flows east to Wilson Piedmont Glacier. Named in association with Mount Curtiss (q.v.) after Captain C.T. Fritter, United States Navy (United States Navy), commander of the seaplane tender USS Curtiss in the Ross Sea, Operation Deep Freeze II, 1956-57.

== Other features ==
=== Queer Mountain ===
77°08′S 161°45′E. A conspicuous black mountain, 1,180 metres (3,870 ft) high, with steep slopes showing bands of sandstone above the granite, standing 1 nautical mile (1.9 km; 1.2 mi) west of Killer Ridge, between the Cotton and Miller Glaciers. Mapped by the British Antarctic Expedition, 1910–13, and so named because, though surrounded by glacier, it has nearly every rock in the district, including coal beds, represented on its cliffs.

=== Low Nunatak ===
77.0736111°S 161.95°E. A nunatak in the Cotton Glacier 2 nautical miles (3.7 km; 2.3 mi) north of the western end of Killer Ridge. About 1 nautical mile (1.9 km; 1.2 mi) long, the nunatak rises 50 metres (160 ft) above the surrounding ice surface to about 450 metres (1,480 ft) above sea level. The descriptive name appears on the map of the British Antarctic Expedition, 1910-13.

=== Killer Ridge ===
77°12′S 162°06′E. Dark ridge rising over 1,000 metres (3,300 ft) high between Crisp and Miller Glaciers. Charted by the British Antarctic Expedition, 1910-13, and named after the killer whale, whose outline the ridge is said to resemble.

=== Second Facet ===
77°11′S 162°18′E. A steep ice-free bluff standing just west of First Facet, the two features together forming the north wall of Debenham Glacier. Charted and descriptively named by the British Antarctic Expedition, 1910-13.

=== First Facet ===
77°09′S 162°30′E. Steep ice-free bluff rising just eastward of Second Facet, forming a part of the north wall of Debenham Glacier. Charted and descriptively named by the British Antarctic Expedition, 1910-13.

=== Mount Jensen ===
77°08′S 162°28′E. A peak over 1,000 metres (3,300 ft) high, just north of First Facet. Mapped and named by the British Antarctic Expedition, 1910–13.

=== Red Ridge ===
77°06′S 162°08′E. A ridge just west of Robson Glacier. The descriptive name was given by F. Debenham of the British Antarctic Expedition (1910-13) during his plane table survey in 1912.

=== Haystack Mountain ===
77°03′S 162°41′E. A mountain over 1,000 metres (3,300 ft) high with a rounded summit suggestive of a mound or haystack, standing 1.5 nautical miles (2.8 km; 1.7 mi) east of Mount England in the northeast part of the Gonville and Caius Range. Charted and named by the British Antarctic Expedition, 1910-13 under Scott.

=== Mount England ===
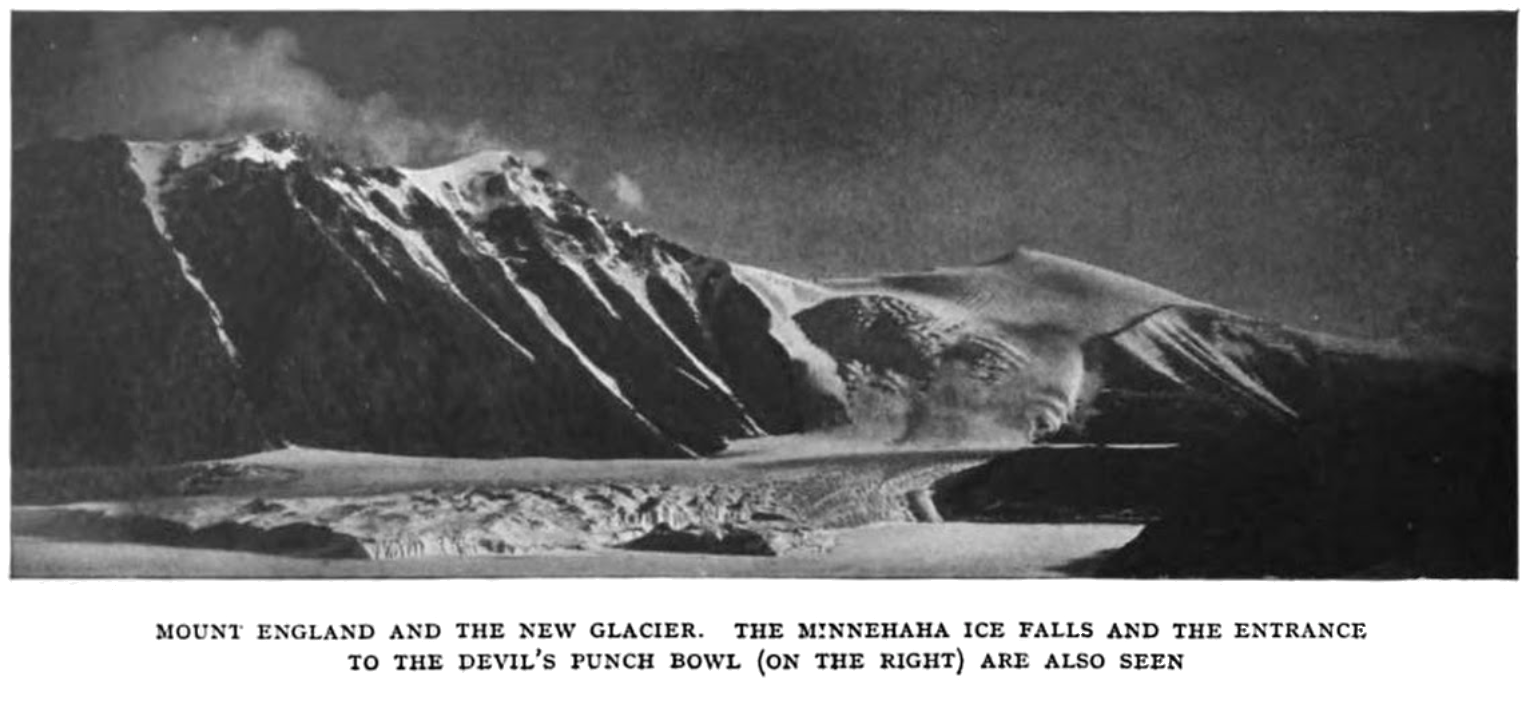
Mount England and the New Glacier

77°03′S 162°27′E. Conical-topped mountain, 1,205 metres (3,953 ft) high, rising immediately south of New Glacier. Discovered by the British National Antarctic Expedition, 1901-04, under Scott, who named it for Lieutenant Rupert England, Royal Navy, of the Morning, relief ship to the expedition.

=== Mount Chaudoin ===
77.152189°S 162.006008°E. An abrupt mountain rising to about 1,400 metres (4,600 ft) in the west part of Gonville and Caius Range. The mountain forms part of the divide between Bachtold Glacier and the head of Griffiths Glacier. Named by US-ACAN (2007) after YNC Robert L. Chaudoin United States Navy (United States Navy) (Seabees), who at the time was the Senior Administrative Yeoman to the commanding officer and member of the construction crew which built the original McMurdo Station and the original South Pole Station in the 1955-57 pre-IGY period. He also was the first United States Navy Postal Clerk at the South Pole Station, 1956.

=== Prescott Spur ===
77.0916667°S 162.275°E. A rock spur running north-south and rising to 1,250 metres (4,100 ft) between Robson Glacier and Pyne Glacier. Named by US-ACAN (2007) after BU2 Richard J. Prescott, United States Navy (United States Navy) (Seabees), who at the time was a member of the construction crew which built the original McMurdo Station, the original Beardmore Refueling Station and the original South Pole Station in the 1955-57 pre-IGY period. He was also a sled dog handler at McMurdo and South Pole Stations.

=== Mount Curtiss ===
77.095442°S 162.449582°E. A peak about 1,300 metres (4,300 ft) high at the east end of the main ridge of Gonville and Caius Range. Named after the seaplane tender USS Curtiss which transported personnel to McMurdo Sound in Operation Deep Freeze II, 1956-57. Departing, she carried out wintering-over personnel of Deep Freeze I and construction party personnel left at Cape Hallett.

=== Stroup Peak ===
77.104167°S 162.616667°E. A peak rising to 1,100 metres (3,600 ft) at the extremity of the ridge extending east from Mount Curtiss. The peak stands 2.7 nautical miles (5.0 km; 3.1 mi) east of Mount Curtiss where it overlooks the north part of Wilson Piedmont Glacier. Named by US-ACAN (2007) after CW04 William E. Stroup, Civil Engineer Corps (CEC), United States Navy (United States Navy) (Seabees), who at the time was the senior enlisted Construction Electrician Chief and member of the construction crew which built the original Little America V Station and the original Byrd Station in the 1955-57 pre-IGY period. He was also a member of the Byrd Traverse to Byrd Station in 1956.

== Sources ==
- Alberts, Fred G., ed. (1995), Geographic Names of the Antarctic (PDF) (2 ed.), United States Board on Geographic Names This article incorporates public domain material from websites or documents of the United States Board on Geographic Names.
- "Bachtold Glacier", Geographic Names Information System, United States Geological Survey, United States Department of the Interior
- "Fritter Glacier", Geographic Names Information System, United States Geological Survey, United States Department of the Interior
- "Griffiths Glacier", Geographic Names Information System, United States Geological Survey, United States Department of the Interior
- "Low Nunatak", Geographic Names Information System, United States Geological Survey, United States Department of the Interior
- "Mount Chaudoin", Geographic Names Information System, United States Geological Survey, United States Department of the Interior
- "Mount Curtiss", Geographic Names Information System, United States Geological Survey, United States Department of the Interior
- "Prescott Spur", Geographic Names Information System, United States Geological Survey, United States Department of the Interior
- "Pyne Glacier", Geographic Names Information System, United States Geological Survey, United States Department of the Interior
- Ross Island, USGS: United States Geological Survey
- "Stroup Peak", Geographic Names Information System, United States Geological Survey, United States Department of the Interior
- Taylor Glacier, USGS: United States Geological Survey

This article incorporates public domain material from websites or documents of the United States Geological Survey.
