= Sprocket Glacier =

Glacier in Antarctica

Sprocket Glacier (77°12′S 160°34′E) is a glacier, 5 km long, flowing north from Skew Peak to abut against the ice of Mackay Glacier at the Chain Moraines, Victoria Land. The name alludes to the use of a bicycle as a practical means of transportation by a glacial mapping party led by Trevor Chinn, summer season 1992–93, and is part of a theme of cycling names in the area. Approved by New Zealand Geographic Board (NZGB) in 1995.
