= Schultz Glacier =

Glacier in Victoria Land, Antarctica

Schultz Glacier (77°19′S 162°20′E) is a glacier flowing east between Pond Peak and Purgatory Peak to join Victoria Lower Glacier. Named by Advisory Committee on Antarctic Names (US-ACAN) for Lieutenant Robert L. Schultz, U.S. Navy, Officer-in-Charge of the Naval Support Force winter-over detachment at McMurdo Station in 1975.
