= Harp Glacier =

Glacier in Antarctica

Harp Glacier (77°32′S 163°14′E) is a tributary glacier flowing south from the glacial col west of Harp Hill into Commonwealth Glacier, Taylor Valley, in Victoria Land, Antarctica. It was named by the Advisory Committee on Antarctic Names in 1997, in association with Harp Hill.
