= Airdevronsix Icefalls =

Icefalls on the Wright Upper Glacier, Antarctica

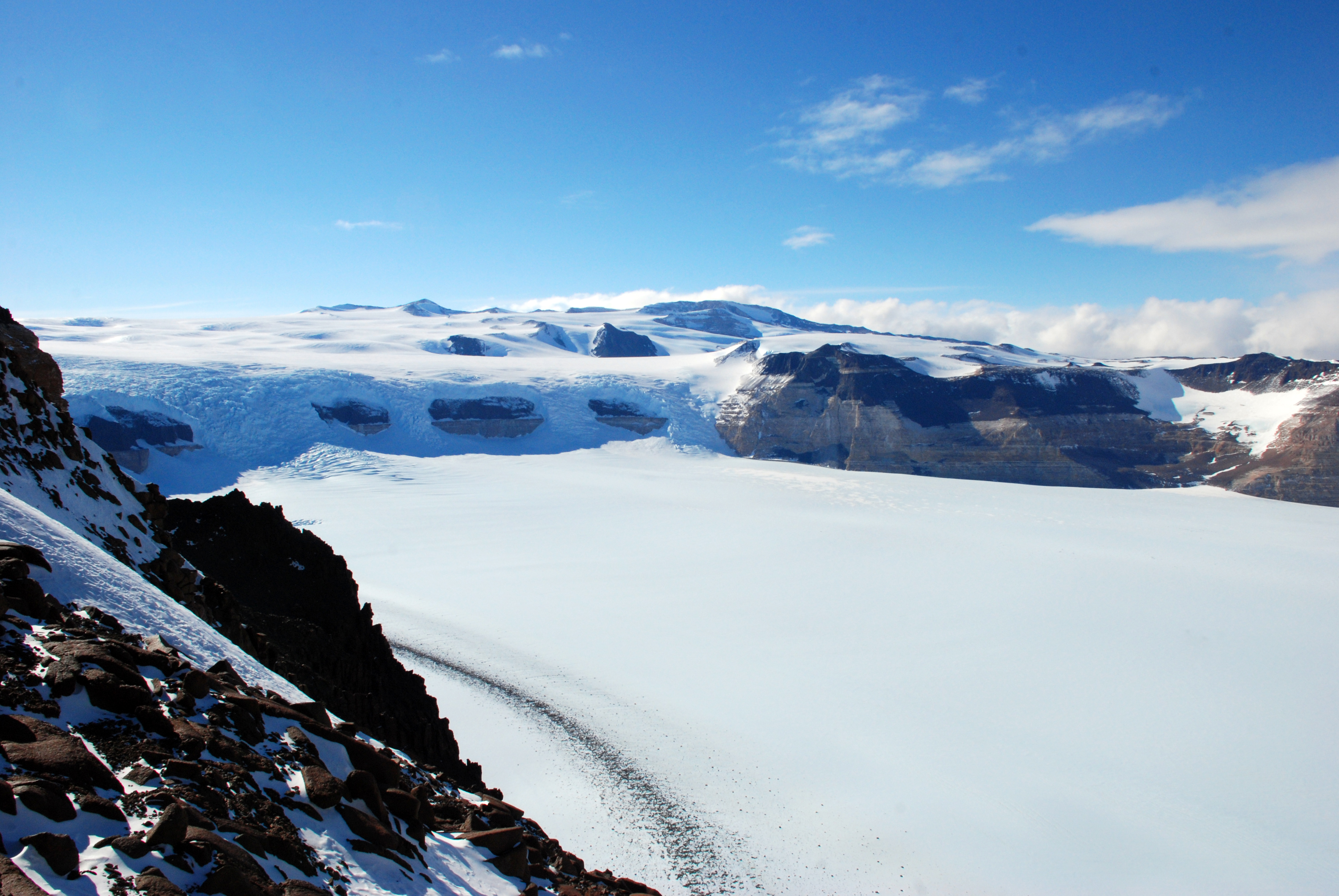
Airdevronsix Icefalls and Wright Upper Glacier (2016)

Airdevronsix Icefalls (77°31′S 160°22′E) is a line of icefalls at the head of Wright Upper Glacier, in Victoria Land, Antarctica. Named by U.S. Navy Operation Deepfreeze (1956–57) for U.S. Navy Air Development Squadron Six, which had been formed to provide air support for the Deep Freeze operations and which had also carried out many important Antarctic exploratory flights.

This icefall belongs to one of the world's most impressive natural landmarks and is approximately 5 kilometres (3.1 miles) wide and 400 metres (1,300 feet) tall. It has formed on Jurassic dolerite sill, which has intruded in Devonian - Triassic sandstone.
