= Plane Table Glacier =

Glacier in Antarctica

Plane Table Glacier (77°34′S 161°29′E) is a short, tapering glacier on the north side of Plane Table that extends part way down the south wall of Wright Valley, Victoria Land. It was named in 1997 by the Advisory Committee on Antarctic Names in association with Plane Table.
