= Ponganis Icefall =

Icefall in Antarctica

Ponganis Icefall (73°32′00″S 169°51′00″E) is an icefall, 1,000 metres (3,300 ft) high and 1.25 nautical miles (2.32 km) wide on the east side of Coulman Island in the Ross Sea. The icefall descends from the Hawkes Heights caldera to the sea at Cape Main. It was named by the Advisory Committee on Antarctic Names in 2005 after Paul J. Ponganis, Center for Marine Biotechnology, Scripps Institution of Oceanography, who studied the behavior and census of Emperor penguins at Cape Crozier, Cape Washington, Beaufort Island, Franklin Island and Coulman Island in 13 field seasons, from 1987 to 2004, and for Katherine V. Ponganis (Mrs. Paul J. Ponganis), a member of the study team in five field seasons.
