= Granite Harbour =

Body of water in Victoria Land, Antarctica

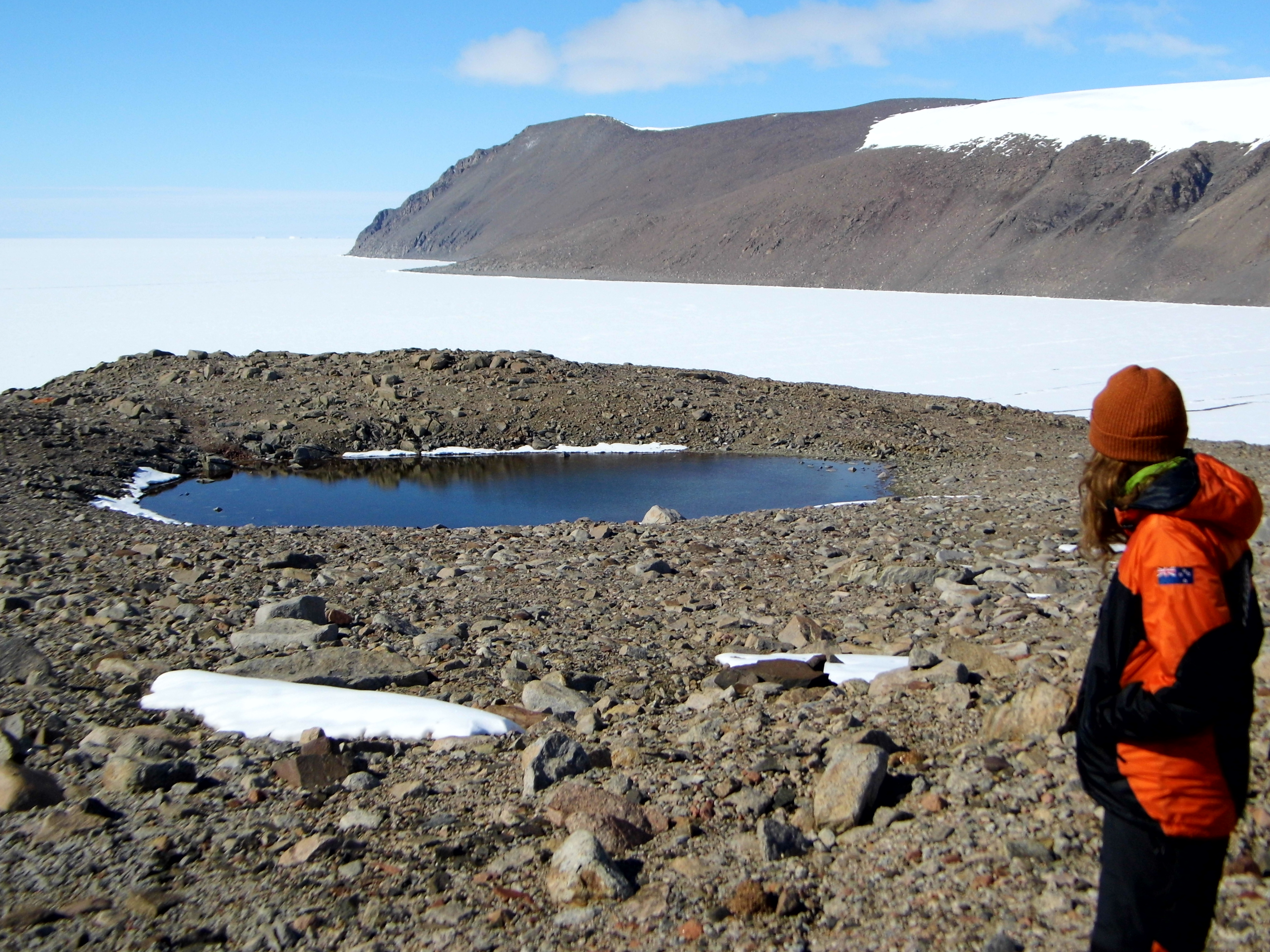
- Lake Chapman with Granite Harbour/Botany Bay in the background

- Location within Antarctica
- Coordinates: 76°53′S 162°44′E
- Type: Bay
- Primary inflows: Mackay Glacier
- Ocean/sea sources: Ross Sea

Granite Harbour (76°53′S 162°44′E) is a bay in the coast of Victoria Land, Antarctica, about 14 nautical miles (26 km; 16 mi) long, entered between Cape Archer and Cape Roberts. It was discovered and named by the British National Antarctic Expedition (BrNAE) of 1901–04 in the Discovery in January 1902, while searching for safe winter quarters for the ship. The name derives from the great granite boulders found on its shores.

== Features ==
Granite Harbor extends from Cape Archer at the south tip of Evans Piedmont Glacier to Cape Roberts on the north of Wilson Piedmont Glacier. Its main inflow is Mackay Glacier, which terminates in Mackay Glacier Tongue, extending into the bay. Features to the north of this glacier include Tiger Island, Benson Glacier, Lion Island, Hunt Glacier, Dreikanter Head, Marston Glacier, Kar Plateau and Point Retreat. Features to the south include Cuff Cape, The Flatiron, Devils Punchbowl, Finger Point, New Glacier, Discovery Bluff, Avalanche Bay, Couloir Cliffs, First View Point and Cape Roberts. Prominent nearby peaks include Red Buttress Peak, Doublefinger Peak, Mount Marston, Mount England and Haystack Mountain.

== Northern features ==
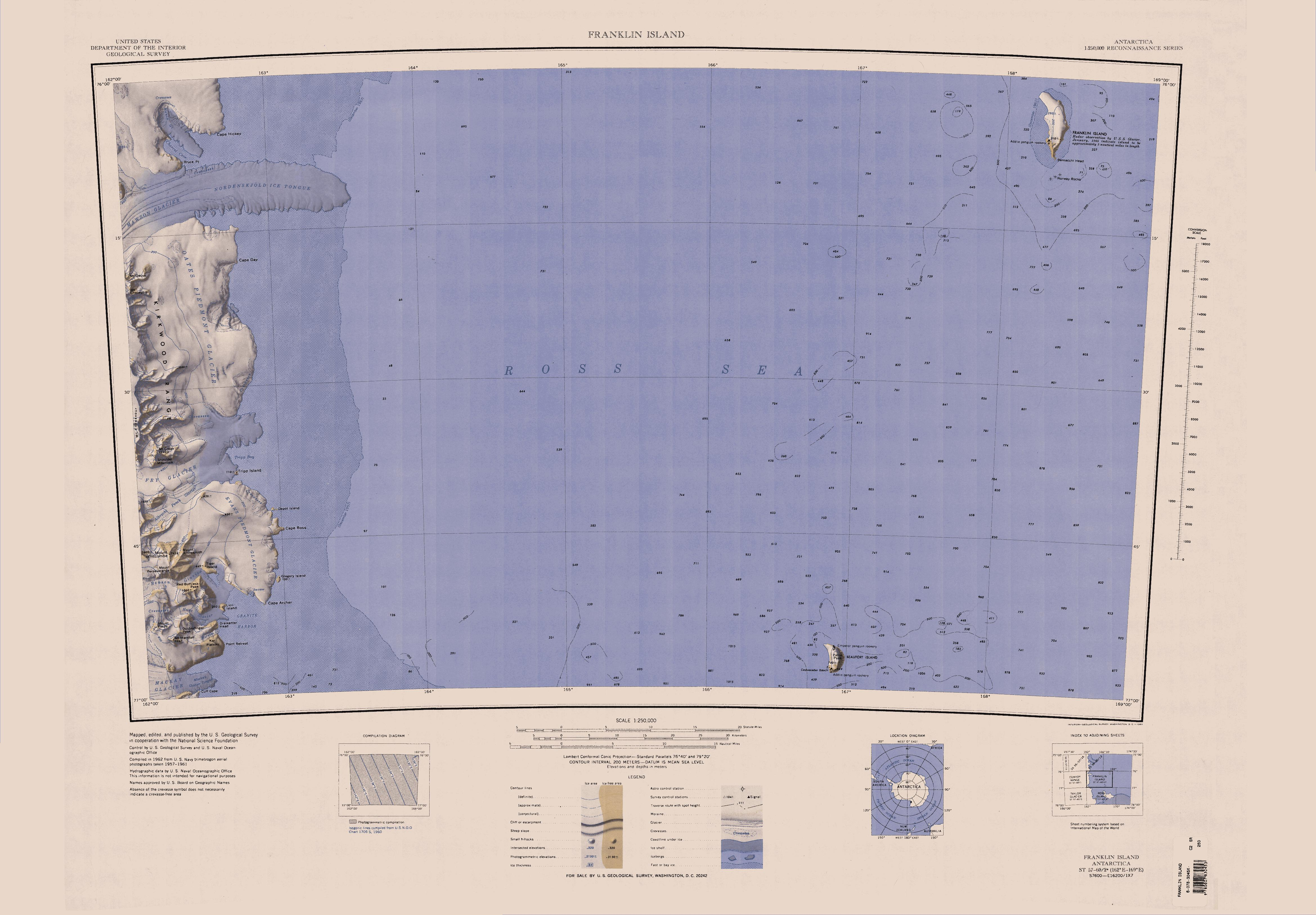
Granite harbour in southwest corner of map

Features to the north of the mouth of Mackay Glacier are, from northeast to southwest:

=== Cape Archer ===
76°51′S 162°52′E. Cape which marks the north side of the entrance to Granite Harbor. Named by the Northern Party of the British Antarctic Expedition, 1910–13 for W.W. Archer, chief steward of the expedition.

=== Stevens Cliff ===
76.8333333°S 162.6666667°E. A cliff between Tiger Island and Cape Archer along the north side of Granite Harbor. The cliff is straight, 3 nautical miles (5.6 km; 3.5 mi) long and rises 200 metres (660 ft) above the sea. Named after Alan R. Stevens, Chief, Science and Application Branch, National Mapping Division. As chief of the Science and Application Branch, he was instrumental to United States Geological Survey (USGS) Antarctic mapping and geodesy programs during the 1990s. He worked in the McMurdo Sound area as a member of the USGS 1994-95 Antarctic field program.

=== Tiger Island ===
76°47′S 162°28′E. An island 4 nautical miles (7.4 km; 4.6 mi) north of Lion Island on the north side of Granite Harbor. The New Zealand Northern Survey-Party of the Commonwealth Trans-Antarctic Expedition (1956–58) established a survey station on its highest point in October 1957. They named it in analogy with nearby Lion Island.

=== Lion Island ===
76°51′S 162°33′E. A small island lying east of the mouth of Hunt Glacier in Granite Harbor. Named by the British Antarctic Expedition 1910–13.

=== Hunt Glacier ===
76°52′S 162°25′E. A small, deeply entrenched glacier on the east coast of Victoria Land, entering Granite Harbor north of Dreikanter Head. Mapped by the British Antarctic Expedition 1910–13. Probably named for H.A. Hunt, Australian meteorologist who assisted in writing the scientific reports of the British Antarctic Expedition1907-09.

=== Dreikanter Head ===
76°53′S 162°30′E. A dark triangular headland between the mouths of Hunt Glacier and Marston Glacier, on the west side of Granite Harbor. The triangular appearance of the feature when viewed from the southeast suggests the name; "Dreikantig" is a German word meaning three-edged.

=== Marston Glacier ===
76°54′S 162°30′E. A glacier draining eastward from Mount Marston and Doublefinger Peak and entering Granite Harbor between Dreikanter Head and the Kar Plateau. The New Zealand Northern Survey Party of the Commonwealth Trans-Antarctic Expedition (1956–58) ascended this glacier en route to Mount Marston in October 1957. They named it for its proximity to that mountain.

=== Kar Plateau ===
76°56′S 162°20′E. A small, mainly snow-covered plateau with an almost vertical rock scarp marking its southern side, standing on the west side of Granite Harbor, just north of the terminus of Mackay Glacier. The plateau rises gently toward the northwest to the heights of Mount Marston. Mapped and named by the British Antarctic Expedition 1910–13. "Kar" is a Turkish word meaning snow.

=== Point Retreat ===
76°55′S 162°33′E. A point at the east extremity of the Kar Plateau, in Granite Harbor. Named by the British Antarctic Expedition 1910–13.

== Southern features ==
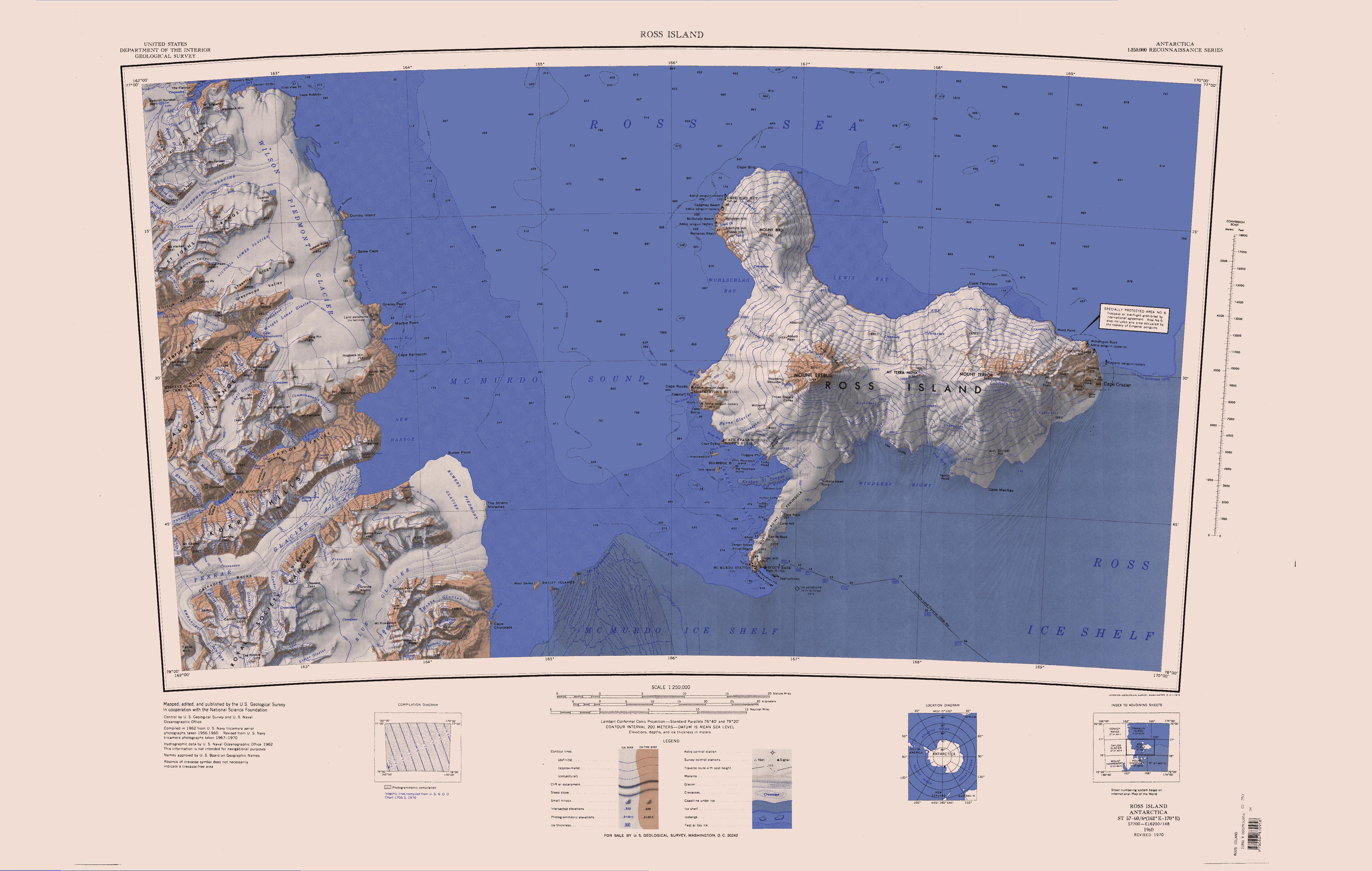
Granite harbour in northwest corner of map

Features to the south of the mouth of Mackay Glacier are, from northwest to southeast:

=== Cuff Cape ===
76°59′S 162°21′E. A dark rock point emerging from the icy coast of Victoria Land, immediately south of Mackay Glacier. Mapped by the British Antarctic Expedition 1910-13 and so named because the dark rock resembles a hand extending from a snowy cuff.

=== The Flatiron ===
77°01′S 162°23′E. Rocky, triangular-shaped headland which overlooks the SW part of Granite Harbor. Charted by the British Antarctic Expedition 1910-13 under Scott, who so named it because of its distinctive shape.

=== Finger Point ===
77°00′S 162°26′E. Narrow rocky point forming the east extremity of The Flatiron, in Granite Harbor. Mapped and descriptively named by the British Antarctic Expedition 1910-13 under Scott.

=== Devils Punchbowl ===
77°01′S 162°24′E. Bowl-shaped cove (an empty cirque, the floor of which is below sea level) in the southwest corner of Granite Harbor, between Devils Ridge and the south side of The Flatiron. Charted and named by the British Antarctic Expedition 1910–13, under Scott.

=== Dewdrop Glacier ===
77°01′S 162°22′E. Small hanging glacier at the head of Devils Punchbowl between The Flatiron and Devils Ridge, at the southwest side of Granite Harbor. Charted by the British Antarctic Expedition 1910-13 under Scott, and named for its suggestive appearance, hanging on the edge of Devils Punchbowl.

=== Devils Ridge ===
77°01′S 162°22′E. Rocky, sickle-shaped ridge extending from the south end of The Flatiron and forming the north wall of New Glacier, close west of Granite Harbor. Charted and named by the British Antarctic Expedition1910-13, under Scott.

=== Devils Thumb ===
77°01′S 162°22′E. Rocky knob, 245 metres (804 ft) high, marking the central part of Devils Ridge, just west of Granite Harbor. Charted and named by the British Antarctic Expedition1910-13, under Scott.

=== New Glacier ===
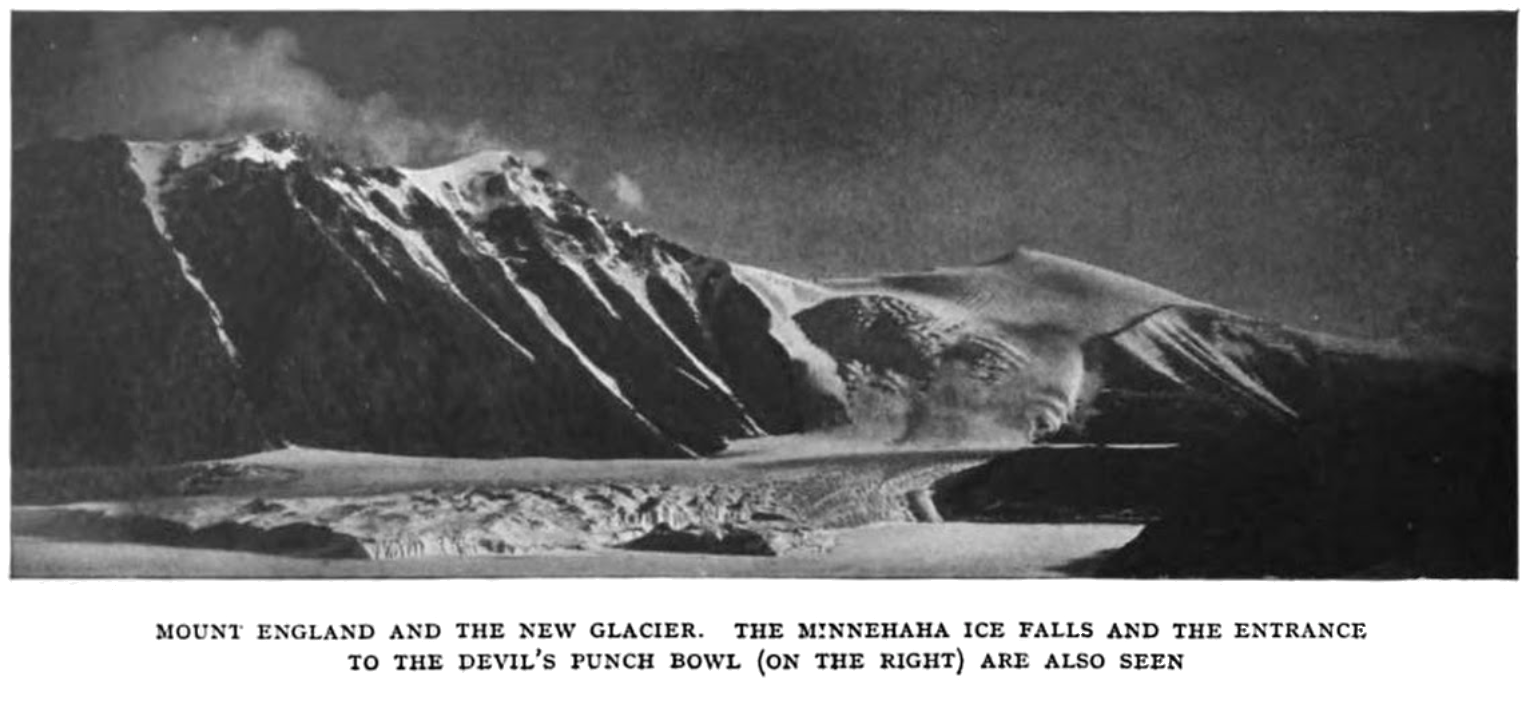
Mount England and the New Glacier

77°02′S 162°24′E. A small glacier flowing east-northeast from the low ice-covered plateau at the south side of Mackay Glacier, terminating at the southwest extremity of Granite Harbor, immediately north of Mount England. Charted and named by G. Taylor, of the British Antarctic Expedition 1910–13, because he walked around a bluff and saw a glacier where none was expected, in the corner of Granite Harbor.

=== Minnehaha Icefalls ===
77°02′S 162°24′E. A small, heavily crevassed icefall descending the steep west slopes of Mount England and forming a southern tributary to New Glacier, close west of its terminus at Granite Harbor. Charted and named by a party of the British Antarctic Expedition 1910-13 led by Taylor. The name was suggested by Frank Debenham.

=== Cape Geology ===
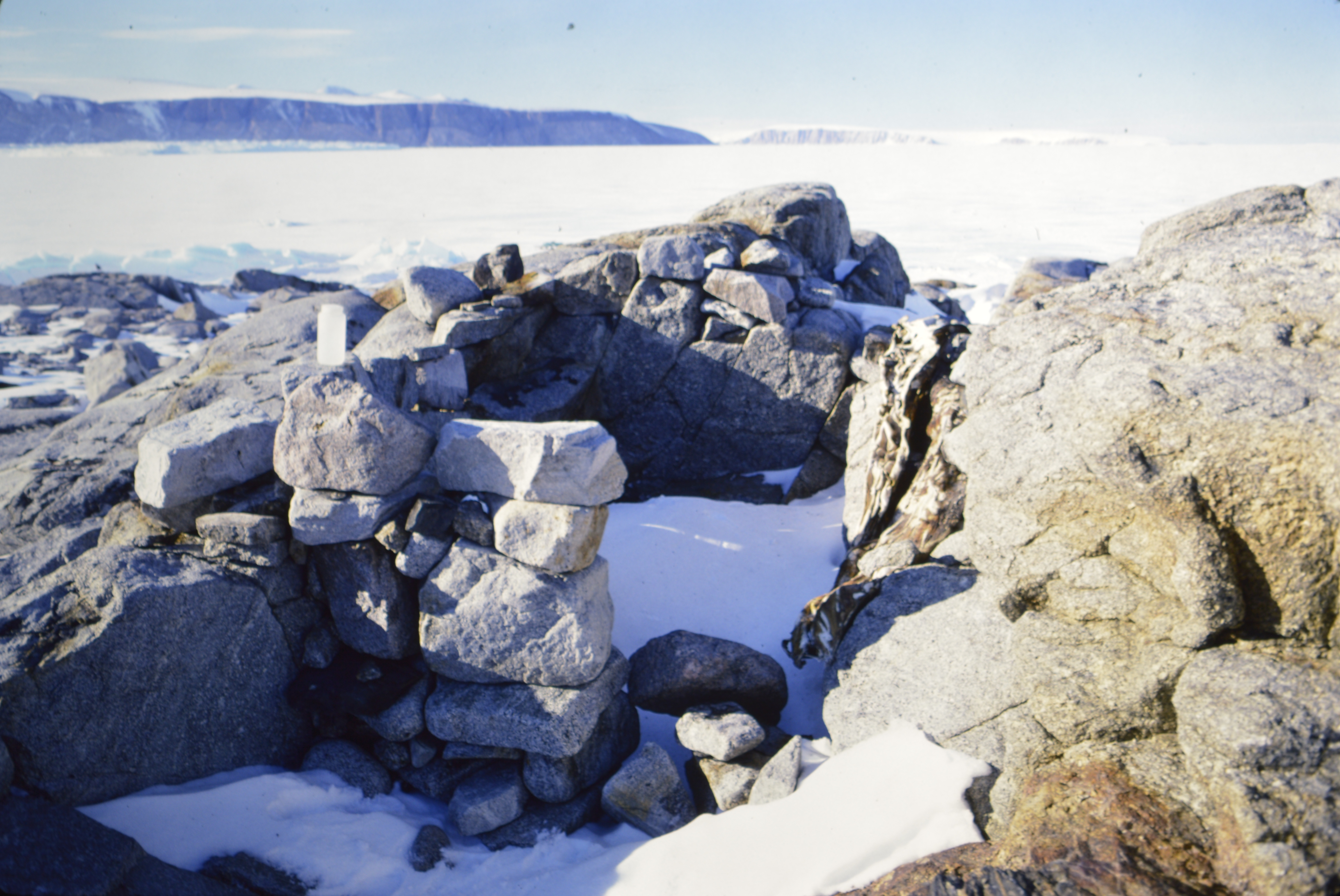
Granite House, Cape Geology 1989

77°00′S 162°32′E. A low, gravel-covered point marking the west limit of Botany Bay, in the south part of Granite Harbor. Charted and named by the Western Geological Party of the British Antarctic Expedition, 1910–13, who established their base here.

=== Botany Bay ===
77°00′S 162°35′E. Small bight between Cape Geology and Discovery Bluff in the south part of Granite Harbor, Victoria Land. Mapped by the Western Geological Party of the British Antarctic Expedition under Scott, who explored the Granite Harbor area in 1911–12. Named by T. Griffith Taylor and Frank Debenham, Australian members of the party, after Botany Bay, Australia.

=== Discovery Bluff ===
77°01′S 162°37′E. Conspicuous headland forming the west side of the entrance to Avalanche Bay in Granite Harbor, Victoria Land. Discovered by the British National Antarctic Expedition 1901 under Scott, who referred to the feature as Rendezvous Bluff. It was renamed for the ship Discovery by Scott's second expedition, the British Antarctic Expedition1910-13.

=== Avalanche Bay ===
77°01′S 162°44′E. Bay 1 nautical mile (1.9 km; 1.2 mi) wide, lying just southeast of Discovery Bluff in Granite Harbor. Mapped by the British Antarctic Expedition 1910–13, under Scott. So named by the expedition's Granite Harbor party because several avalanches were heard while sledging in this locality.

=== Couloir Cliffs ===
77°01′S 162°48′E. Granite cliffs, 3 nautical miles (5.6 km; 3.5 mi) long and from 30 to 60 metres (98 to 197 ft) high, at the east side of Avalanche Bay in Granite Harbor. Named by the Granite Harbor Geological Party, led by Taylor, of the British Antarctic Expedition 1910–13, because these cliffs have numerous chimneys and couloirs.

=== First View Point ===
77°01′S 163°03′E. A small point between Cape Roberts and Avalanche Bay in Granite Harbor. Named by the Granite Harbor Geological Party, led by Taylor, of the British Antarctic Expedition 1910–13.

=== Cape Roberts ===
77°02′S 163°12′E. Cape at the south side of the entrance to Granite Harbor on the coast of Victoria Land. Discovered by the South Magnetic Pole Party, led by David, of the British Antarctic Expedition (BrAE) (1907–09) and named for William C. Roberts, assistant zoologist and cook for the expedition.

== Nearby peaks ==
=== Red Buttress Peak ===
76°49′S 162°21′E. A rock peak, 1,060 metres (3,480 ft) high, surmounting the bold rock mass between the lower Benson Glacier and lower Hunt Glacier. Its east face is an immense cliff of red granite. Mapped and given this descriptive name by the 1957 New Zealand Northern Survey Party of the Commonwealth Trans-Antarctic Expedition, 1956–58.

=== Doublefinger Peak ===
76°53′S 162°15′E. A peak about 4 nautical miles (7.4 km; 4.6 mi) inland from Granite Harbor, just northeast of Mount Marston. Named by the British Antarctic Expedition 1910–13. A snow filled cleft along the east face of the peak separates two dark rock exposures, suggesting the origin of the name.

=== Mount Marston ===
76°54′S 162°12′E. A whaleback-shaped mountain, 1,245 metres (4,085 ft) high, standing at the north side of Kar Plateau, 3 nautical miles (5.6 km; 3.5 mi) north of the terminus of Mackay Glacier. First mapped by the British Antarctic Expedition 1907-09 and named for George E. Marston, artist with the expedition. Not: Whaleback.

== Sources ==
- Alberts, Fred G., ed. (1995), Geographic Names of the Antarctic (PDF) (2 ed.), United States Board on Geographic Names This article incorporates public domain material from websites or documents of the United States Board on Geographic Names.
- Franklin Island, USGS: United States Geological Survey
- Ross Island, USGS: United States Geological Survey
- "Stevens Cliff", Geographic Names Information System, United States Geological Survey, United States Department of the Interior

This article incorporates public domain material from websites or documents of the United States Geological Survey.
