= Wilson Piedmont Glacier =

Glacier in Antarctica

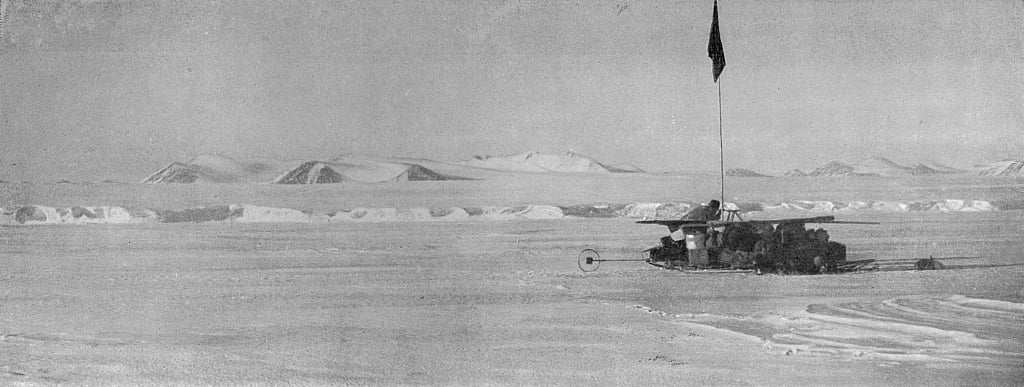
- The Wilson Piedmont Glacier in Antarctica, showing the continuous ice cliffs, c. 1911

- Location within Antarctica
- Location: Ross Dependency
- Coordinates: 77°15′S 163°10′E
- Terminus: Ross Sea

Wilson Piedmont Glacier (77°15′S 163°10′E) is a large piedmont glacier extending from Granite Harbour to Marble Point on the coast of Victoria Land.

== Discovery and name ==
The Wilson Piedmont Glacier was discovered by the Discovery expedition, 1901–1904. The British Antarctic Expedition, 1910–1913, named the feature for Dr. Edward A. Wilson, surgeon and artist with Scott's first expedition and chief of the scientific staff with the second. Wilson lost his life on the way back from the South Pole with Scott.

== Glaciology ==
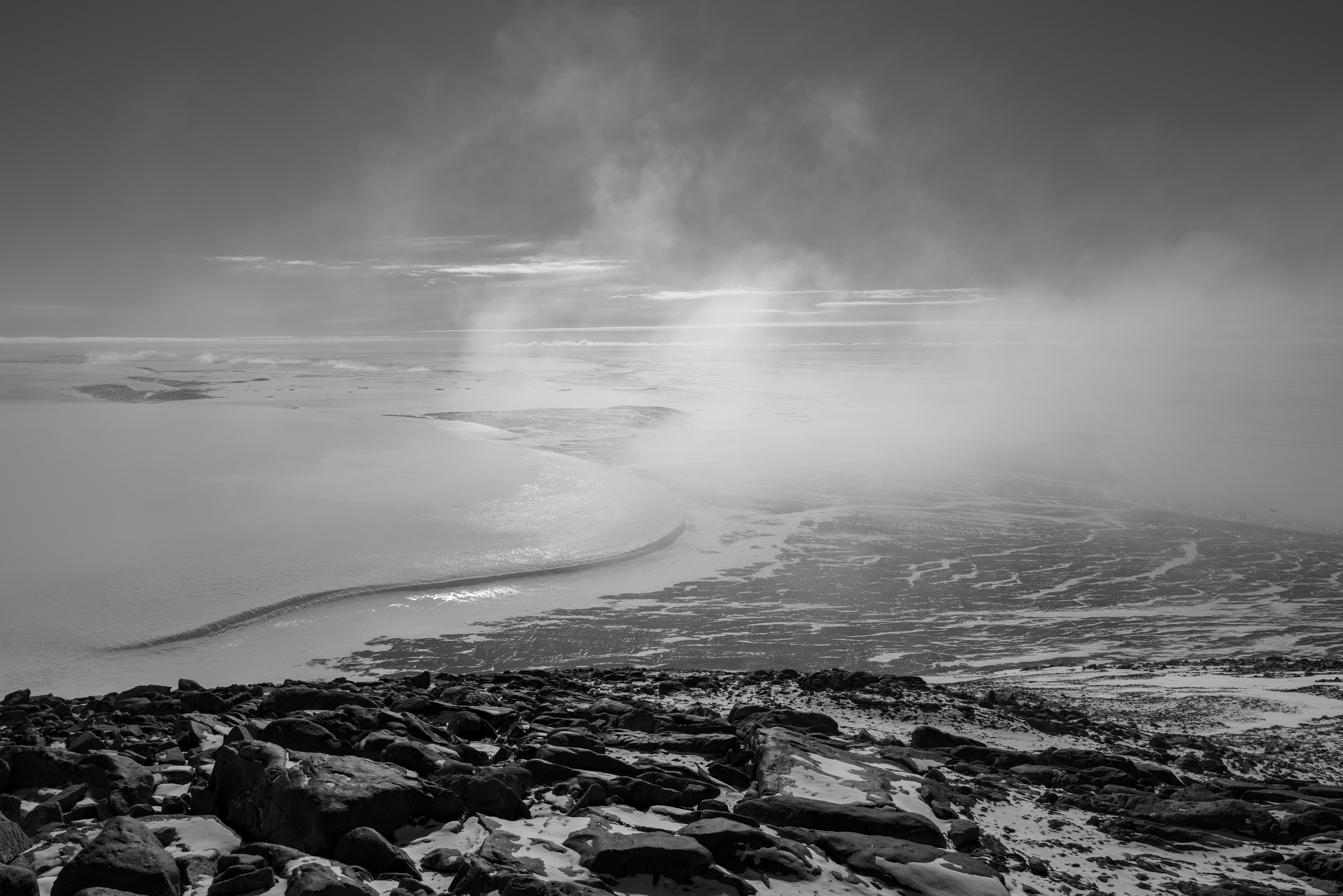
Wilson Piedmont Glacier and McMurdo Sound from the summit of Hogback Hill

The Wilson Piedmont Glacier extends along the coastal plain of the west coast of the Ross Sea from Granite Harbor south to McMurdo Sound. Most of its input is from direct precipitation, but it receives some inflows from alpine glaciers. It has a broad dome with a divide near the McMurdo Dry Valleys. Most ice flows east to the Ross Sea, where the glacier terminates and comes afloat in the sea along its eastern margin. Some ice flows west and contributes to the Wright Lower Glacier and the Victoria Lower Glacier. In the past there was more westward flow than at present.

The Wilson Piedmont Glacier was thicker during the Last Glacial Maximum (LGM) and extended further to the east and south over the Scott Coast, where it merged with the Ross Ice Shelf. Ice reached an elevation of 470 metres (1,540 ft) above Cape Bernacchi and 350 metres (1,150 ft) on Hjorth Hill. However, it did not extend further inland than it does today, and may not have extended as far, probably because there was less precipitation. The margin of the glacier has continued to fluctuate during the present Holocene era. It retreated to a smaller area than at present in the mid-Holocene, then advanced until less than 250 years ago. Since 1956 it has again retreated, in some places as much as 600 metres (2,000 ft).

== Location ==
The glacier extends along the Ross Sea coast from Granite Harbour in the north, reaching south past Cape Dunlop, Dunlop Island, Hanson Ridge, Spike Cape, Bay of Sails, Gneiss Point, Marble Point, Hogback Hill to Cape Bernacchi, Hjorth Hill and Mount Coleman to the south. The Commonwealth Glacier adjoins it to the south, to the north of Mount Falconer, and the Loftus Glacier and Newall Glacier feed its southwest corner, flowing towards the King Pin nunatak. North of Kingpin is the Wright Lower Glacier. This is separated from Victoria Lower Glacier by Mount Doorly, the Greenwood Valley and the Staeffler Ridge. To the north of the Saint Johns Range and south of the Gonville and Caius Range the Debenham Glacier flows into the Wilson Piedmont Glacier. The Debenham Glacier is fed by the Willis Glacier and the Miller Glacier. The Miller Glacier adjoins the Cotton Glacier in the Clare Range.

== Meltwater streams ==
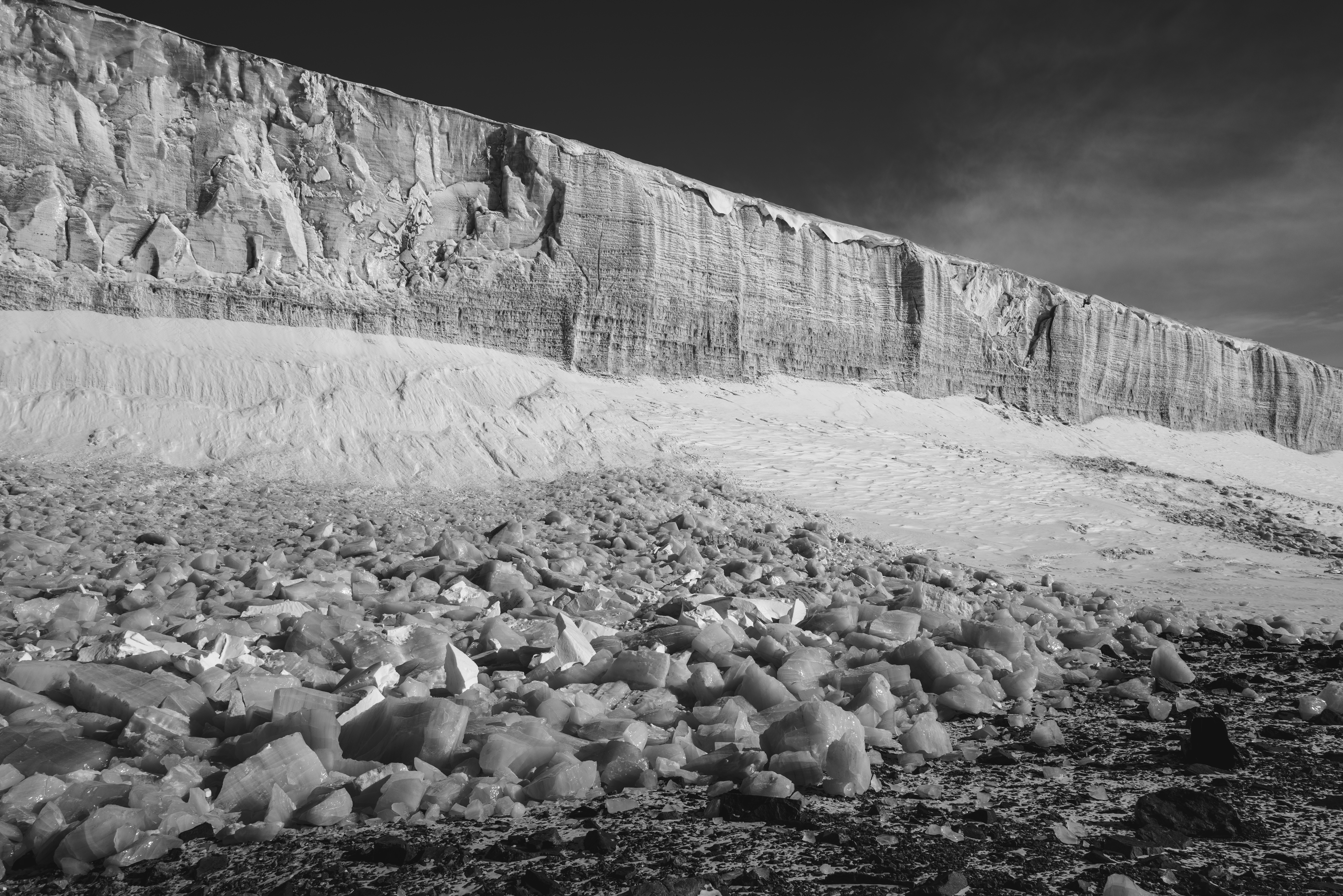
Wilson Piedmont Glacier from below

The Ball Stream, Surko Stream, Scheuren Stream and South Stream are meltwater streams that leave the glacier and flow into the Ross Sea. They were all studied by Robert L. Nichols, geologist for Metcalf and Eddy, Engineers of Boston, Massachusetts, which made engineering studies here under contract to the United States Navy in the 1957–58 season.

=== Ball Stream ===
77°26′S 163°43′E. A meltwater stream 2 nautical miles (3.7 km; 2.3 mi) west of Marble Point on the coast of Victoria Land. It issues from the front of Wilson Piedmont Glacier and flows northeast to Surko Stream just west of where the latter enters Arnold Cove. Named by Nichols for Donald G. Ball, soil physicist with Metcalf and Eddy.

=== Surko Stream ===
77°25′S 163°44′E. A meltwater stream 1 nautical mile (1.9 km; 1.2 mi) south of Gneiss Point on the coast of Victoria Land. It issues from the front of Wilson Piedmont Glacier and flows eastward to Arnold Cove. Named by Nichols for Lt. Alexander Surko, USN, second-in-command of the Navy party that worked on the aircraft landing strip close north of this stream.

=== Scheuren Stream ===
77°24′S 163°39′E. A meltwater stream 1 nautical mile (1.9 km; 1.2 mi) west of Gneiss Point on the coast of Victoria Land. It issues from the front of Wilson Piedmont Glacier and drains northward to the Bay of Sails. Named by Nichols for John J. Scheuren, Jr., chief of Metcalf and Eddy's field party.

=== South Stream ===
77°27′S 163°44′E. A meltwater stream 2 nautical miles (3.7 km; 2.3 mi) southwest of Marble Point on the coast of Victoria Land. It issues from the front of Wilson Piedmont Glacier and flows southeastward to Bernacchi Bay. So named by Nichols because the stream was located south of the U.S. Navy installations in the Marble Point area.

== Glaciers ==
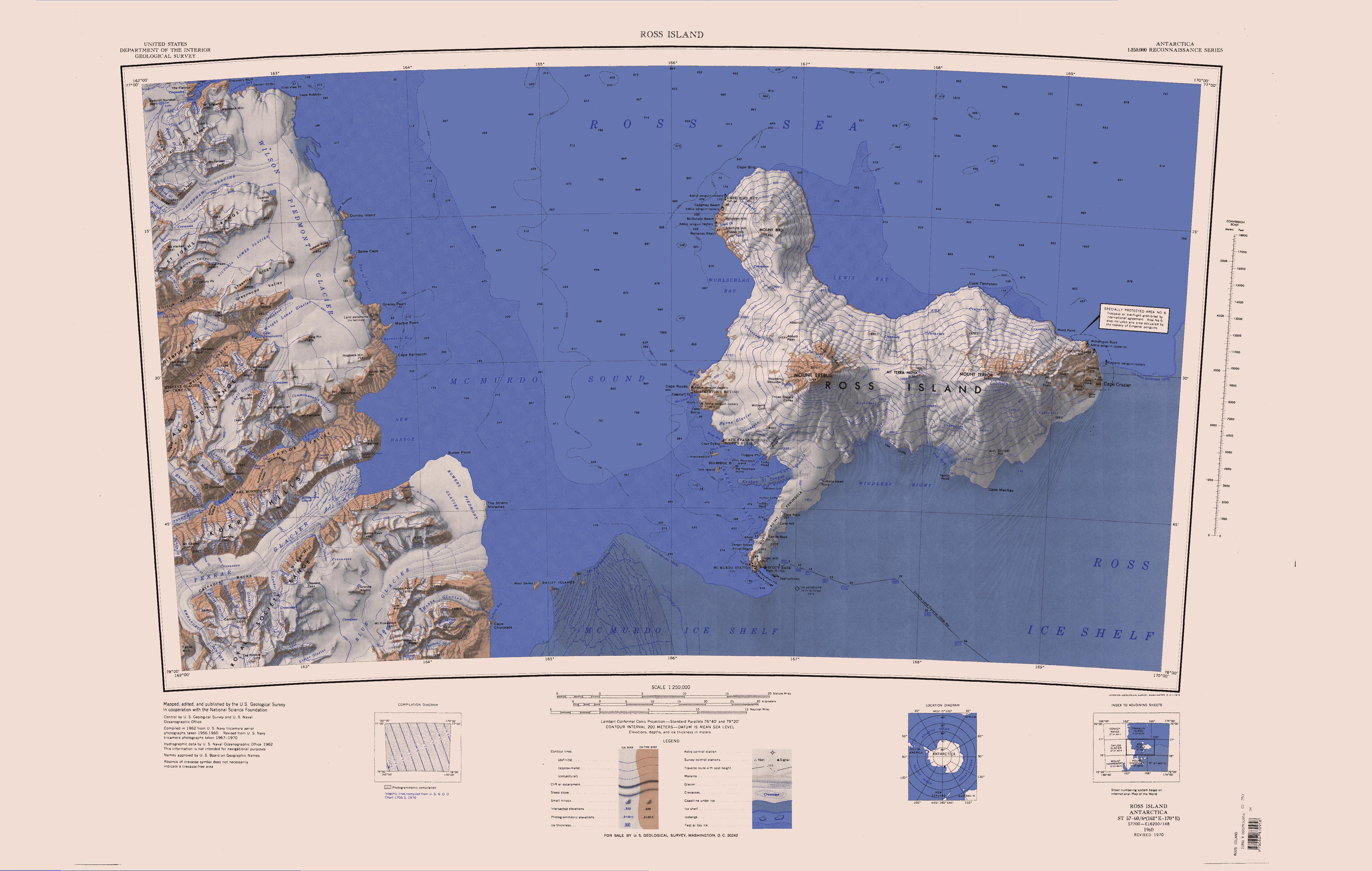
Wilson Piedmont Glacier in northwest of map

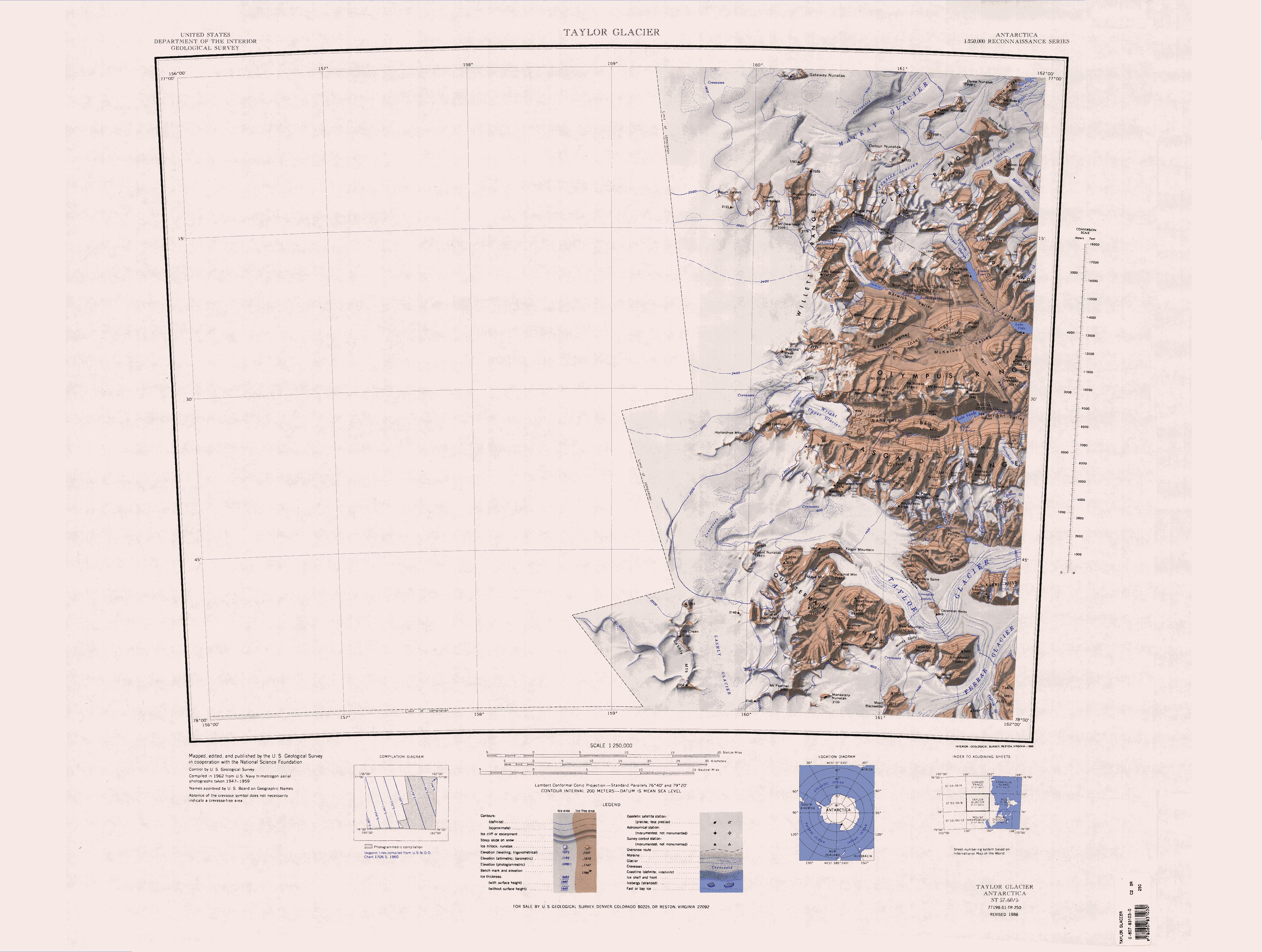
Terrain to the west

Glaciers adjoining, fed by or feeding the Wilson Piedmont Glacier include, from south to north:

=== Commonwealth Glacier ===
77°35′S 163°19′E. Glacier which flows in a southeast direction and enters the north side of Taylor Valley immediately west of Mount Coleman. Charted and named by the BrAE under Scott, 1910–13. Named for the Commonwealth of Australia, which made a financial grant to the BrAE and contributed two members to the Western Geological Party which explored this area.

=== Newall Glacier ===
77°30′S 162°50′E. Glacier in the east part of the Asgard Range, flowing east between Mount Newall and Mount Weyant into the Wilson Piedmont Glacier. Mapped by the New Zealand Northern Survey Party of the CTAE, 1956–58, who named it after nearby Mount Newall.

=== Wright Lower Glacier ===
77°25′S 163°00′E. A stagnant glacier occupying the mouth of Wright Valley and coalescing at its east side with Wilson Piedmont Glacier. Formerly called Wright Glacier, but that name was amended by the VUWAE (1958–59) to distinguish this glacier from Wright Upper Glacier at the head of Wright Valley. Originally named by the BrAE (1910–13) for Charles S. Wright, physicist with the expedition.

=== Debenham Glacier ===
77°10′S 162°38′E. Glacier flowing into the northern part of Wilson Piedmont Glacier. First mapped by the BrNAE (1901–04). It was named by the BrAE (1910–13) for Frank Debenham, geologist with the expedition and Director of the Scott Polar Research Institute, 1925–48.

=== Willis Glacier ===
77°16′S 162°05′E. Valley glacier in the St. Johns Range of Victoria Land, flowing northeast from Schist Peak along the west side of Mount Harker to Debenham Glacier. Charted by the VUWAE, 1959–60, and named by them for I.A.G. Willis, geophysicist with the expedition.

=== Miller Glacier ===
77°12′S 162°00′E. A glacier about 1 nautical mile (1.9 km; 1.2 mi) wide, described by Griffith Taylor as a transection glacier lying in a transverse trough and connecting the Cotton and Debenham Glaciers. Discovered by the Western Geological Party, led by Taylor, of the BrAE, 1910–13. Named by Taylor for M.J. Miller, Mayor of Lyttelton, and the shipwright who repaired the expedition vessel, Terra Nova, prior to its voyage from New Zealand.

=== Cotton Glacier ===
77°07′S 161°40′E. A glacier about 10 nautical miles (19 km; 12 mi) long on the south side of Clare Range, flowing eastward between Sperm Bluff and Queer Mountain, in Victoria Land. Discovered by the Western Geological Party, led by Thomas Griffith Taylor, of the BrAE, 1910–13. Named by Taylor for Prof. Leslie A. Cotton, of the geology department of Sydney University. Cotton had earlier been a Summer Party member of the BrAE, 1907–09.

== Coastal features ==
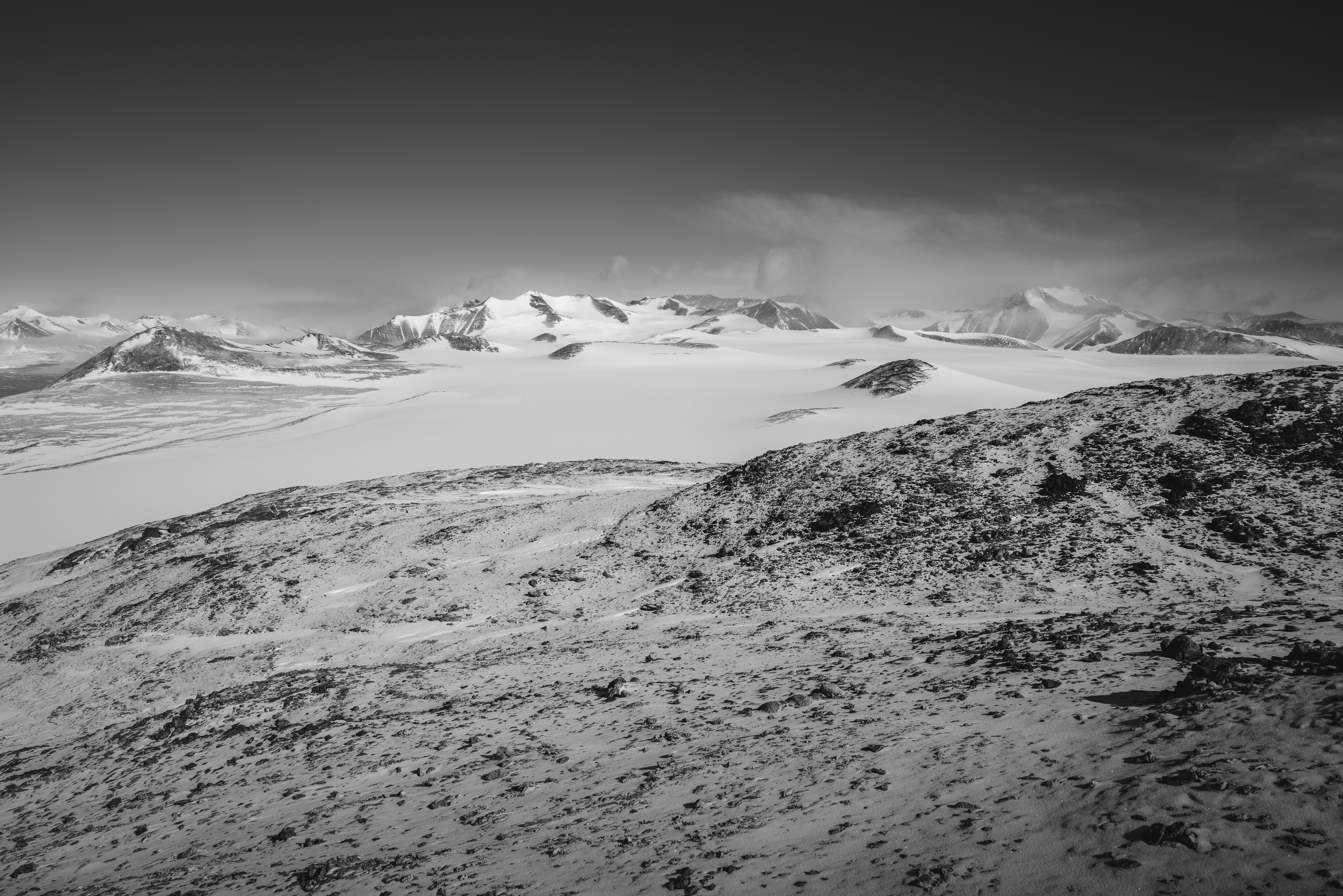
The Asgard Range from the summit of Hogback Hill

Features along the Ross Sea coast of the Wilson Piedmont Glacier on the Ross Sea include, from the north:

=== Cape Dunlop ===
77°14′S 163°27′E. Rocky point just west of Dunlop Island on the coast of Victoria Land. First mapped by the BrAE (1907–09) under Ernest Shackleton, who named this feature Rocky Point. It has since taken its name from Dunlop Island.

=== Dunlop Island ===
77°14′S 163°30′E. Rocky island, 1 nautical mile (1.9 km; 1.2 mi) long, lying just off the Wilson Piedmont Glacier and the coast of Victoria Land, close northeast of Cape Dunlop. First mapped by the BrAE (1907–09) under Shackleton, who named it for H.J.L. Dunlop, chief engineer of the ship Nimrod. Not: Terrace Island.

=== Spike Cape ===
77°18′S 163°34′E. A bare rocky point from which the Wilson Piedmont Glacier has receded, lying 4 nautical miles (7.4 km; 4.6 mi) south of Dunlop Island. First mapped by the BrAE, 1910–13. The name was suggested by Seaman Forde, and adopted by Taylor, for its likeness to Spike Island at Plymouth, England.

=== Bay of Sails ===
77°21′S 163°34′E. A shallow indentation of the coast of Victoria Land between Spike Cape and Gneiss Point. The name was suggested by the Western Geological Party of the BrAE (1910–13), which while sledging across the ice at the mouth of the bay erected makeshift sails on their man-drawn sledge, thereby increasing the speed.

=== Kolich Point ===
77°21′S 163°33′E. Rock point midway between Spike Cape and Gneiss Point on the east coast of Victoria Land. Named by US-ACAN for Thomas M. Kolich, geophysicist who participated in the USARP geophysical survey of the Ross Ice Shelf in the 1973–74 and 1974–75 seasons.

=== Gneiss Point ===
77°24′S 163°44′E. Rocky point 2 nautical miles (3.7 km; 2.3 mi) north of Marble Point, on the coast of Victoria Land. First mapped by the BrAE (1910–13) under Scott and so named because of gneissic granite found here.

=== Arnold Cove ===
77°25′S 163°46′E. A cove along the west margin of McMurdo Sound between Gneiss Point and Marble Point. Named by US-ACAN for Charles L. Arnold, leader of a USARP party that made an engineering study of Marble Point, McMurdo Station and Williams Field in the 1971–72 season.

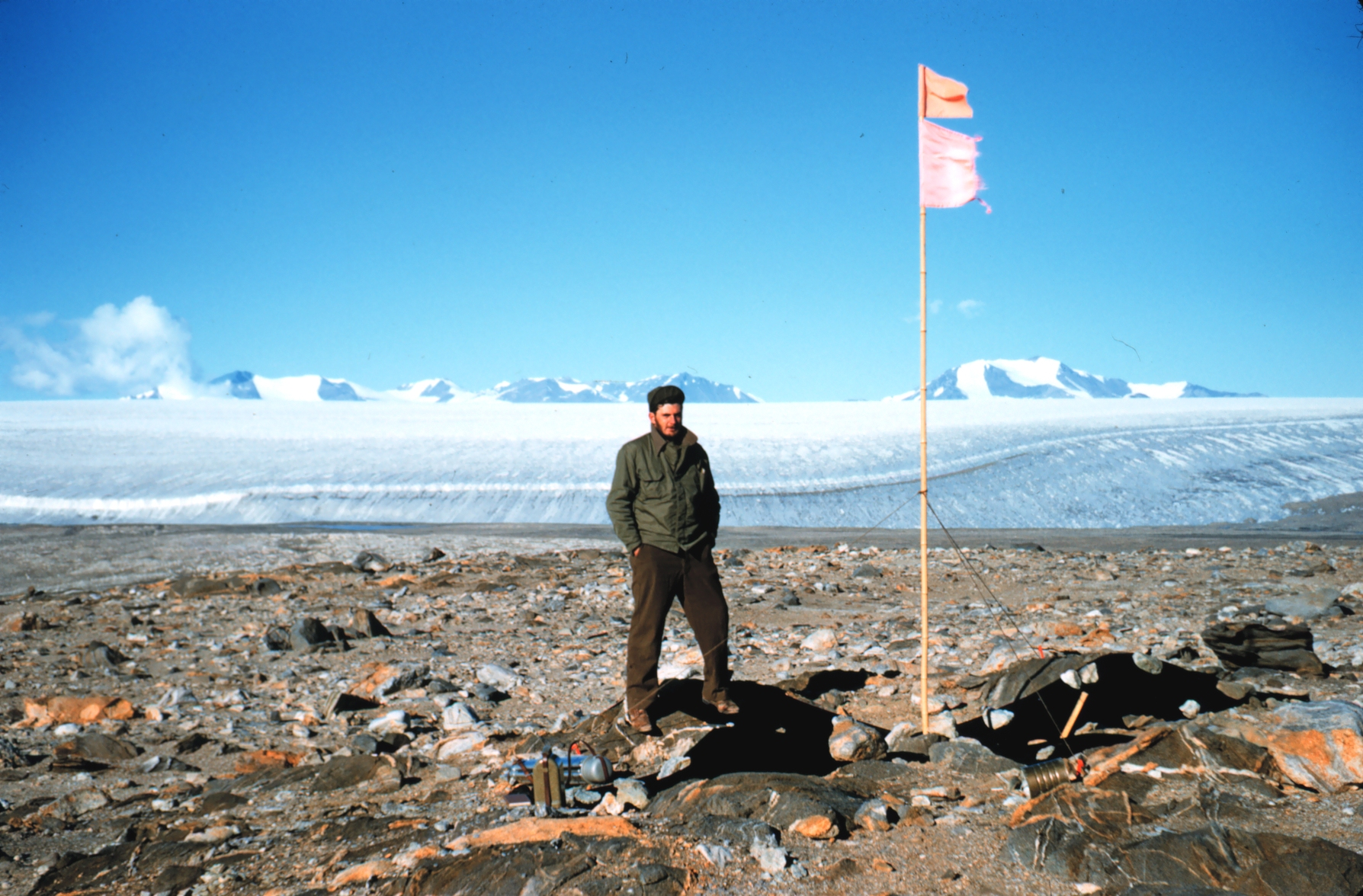
Marble Point's relatively flat terrain facilitated construction in 1957 of a now-defunct dirt airstrip

=== Marble Point ===
77°26′S 163°50′E. A rocky promontory of marble lying 3 nautical miles (5.6 km; 3.5 mi) north of Cape Bernacchi on the coast of Victoria Land. Mapped by the BrAE (1907–09) and so named because of the marble found there.

=== Hogback Hill ===
77°29′S 163°36′E. Rounded mountain, 735 m, rising just north of Hjorth Hill and 4 nautical miles (7.4 km; 4.6 mi) west of Cape Bernacchi. Charted and given this descriptive name by the BrAE under Scott 1910–13.

=== Bernacchi Bay ===
77°28′S 163°27′E. Bay about 3 nautical miles (5.6 km; 3.5 mi) wide between Marble Point and Cape Bernacchi, on the coast of Victoria Land. Named after Cape Bernacchi by the BrAE under Scott, 1910–13.

=== Hjorth Hill ===
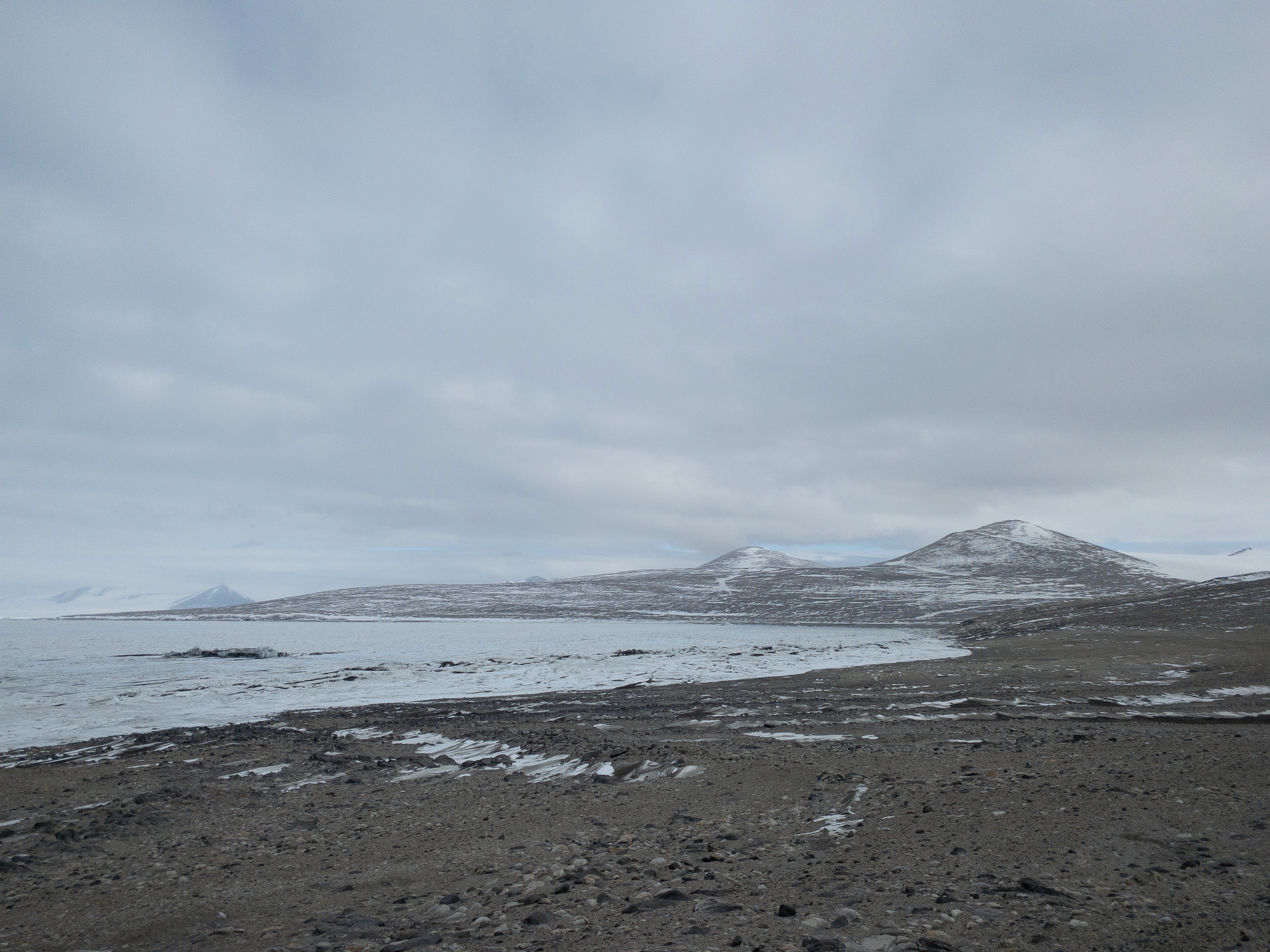
Hogback and Hjorth Hills from Marble Point

77°31′S 163°37′E. A rounded, ice-free mountain 760 m, standing just north of New Harbor and 2 nautical miles (3.7 km; 2.3 mi) south of Hogback Hill. Charted by the BrAE, 1910–13, led by Scott, and named for the maker of the primus lamps used by the expedition. The name is spelled Hjort's Hill in the popular narrative of Scott's expedition, but Hjorth's Hill is used on the map accompanying the narrative. The recommended spelling is based upon the form consistently used on the maps accompanying the BrAE scientific reports.

== Isolated features ==
Isolated features in or beside the Wilson Piedmont Glacier include:

=== Kaminuma Crag ===
77.626555°S 162.448246°E. A craggy, island-like nunatak, 0.75 nautical miles (1.39 km; 0.86 mi) long, rising to 1,750 metres (5,740 ft) in the uppermost névé area of the Newall Glacier, Asgard Range. Named by Advisory Committee on Antarctic Names (US-ACAN) (1997) after Japanese geophysicist Katsutada Kaminuma, Professor of Earth Sciences, National Institute of Polar Research, Tokyo, who worked eight field seasons in the McMurdo Sound region: two seasons with the Dry Valleys Drilling Project, 1974–75, 1975–76; one season with Antarctic Search for Meteorites, 1976–77; five seasons with International Mount Erebus Seismic Survey, 1979–80, 1982–83, 1983–84, 1985–86, 1986–87.

=== King Pin ===
77°27′S 163°10′E. Nunatak, 820 metres (2,690 ft) high, rising above the Wilson Piedmont Glacier about midway between Mount Doorly and Hogback Hill. Named by the VUWAE, 1958–59, after the American helicopter King Pin which flew the party into this area, and which rendered a similar service in two other years to New Zealand parties.

=== Greenwood Valley ===
77°21′S 162°54′E. Ice-filled valley at the west side of Wilson Piedmont Glacier, lying between Staefller Ridge and Mount Doorly in Victoria Land. Named by the US-AC AN for Russell A. Greenwood, USN, who was in charge of heavy equipment maintenance at McMurdo Station, 1962.

=== Staeffler Ridge ===
77°20′S 162°48′E. A long ridge west of Hanson Ridge, separating Victoria Lower Glacier from Greenwood Valley in Victoria Land. Named by the US-ACAN in 1964 for George R. Staeffler, topographic engineer with the United States Geological Survey, who worked in the McMurdo Sound area during 1960–61.

=== Blessing Bluff ===
77°19′S 163°03′E. Prominent rock bluff that marks the east end of Staeffler Ridge and overlooks Wilson Piedmont Glacier, located 6.5 nautical miles (12.0 km; 7.5 mi) west of Spike Cape, Victoria Land. Named by US-ACAN for Cdr. George R. Blessing, USN, Officer-in-Charge of the Naval Support Force winter-over detachment at McMurdo Station in 1973.

=== Hanson Ridge ===
77°17′S 163°19′E. Prominent ice-free ridge situated 3 nautical miles (5.6 km; 3.5 mi) northwest of Spike Cape, near the center of Wilson Piedmont Glacier. The feature was "Black Ridge" on maps of the BrAE under Scott, 1910–13, but that name is already in use in Victoria Land. In order to avoid identical names it was renamed in 1964 by the US-ACAN for Kirby J. Hanson, meteorologist at the South Pole Station, 1958.

== Sources ==
- Alberts, Fred G., ed. (1995), Geographic Names of the Antarctic (PDF) (2 ed.), United States Board on Geographic Names This article incorporates public domain material from websites or documents of the United States Board on Geographic Names.
- Hall, Brenda; Denton, George H. (2002), "Holocene history of the Wilson Piedmont Glacier along the southern Scott Coast, Antarctica", The Holocene, 12 (5): 619–627, doi:10.1191/0959683602hl572rp
- "Kaminuma Crag", Geographic Names Information System, United States Geological Survey, United States Department of the Interior
- Taylor Glacier, USGS: United States Geological Survey
- Ross Island, USGS: United States Geological Survey
- This article incorporates public domain material from websites or documents of the United States Geological Survey.
