= Trevor Chinn (glaciologist) =

New Zealand glaciologist (1937–2018)

- Born: 9 August 1937
- Died: 20 December 2018 (aged 81)
- Education: BSc, MSc, DSc University of Canterbury
- Scientific career
- Fields: Glaciology
- Workplaces: Ministry of Works and Development; DSIR Geological Survey; NIWA

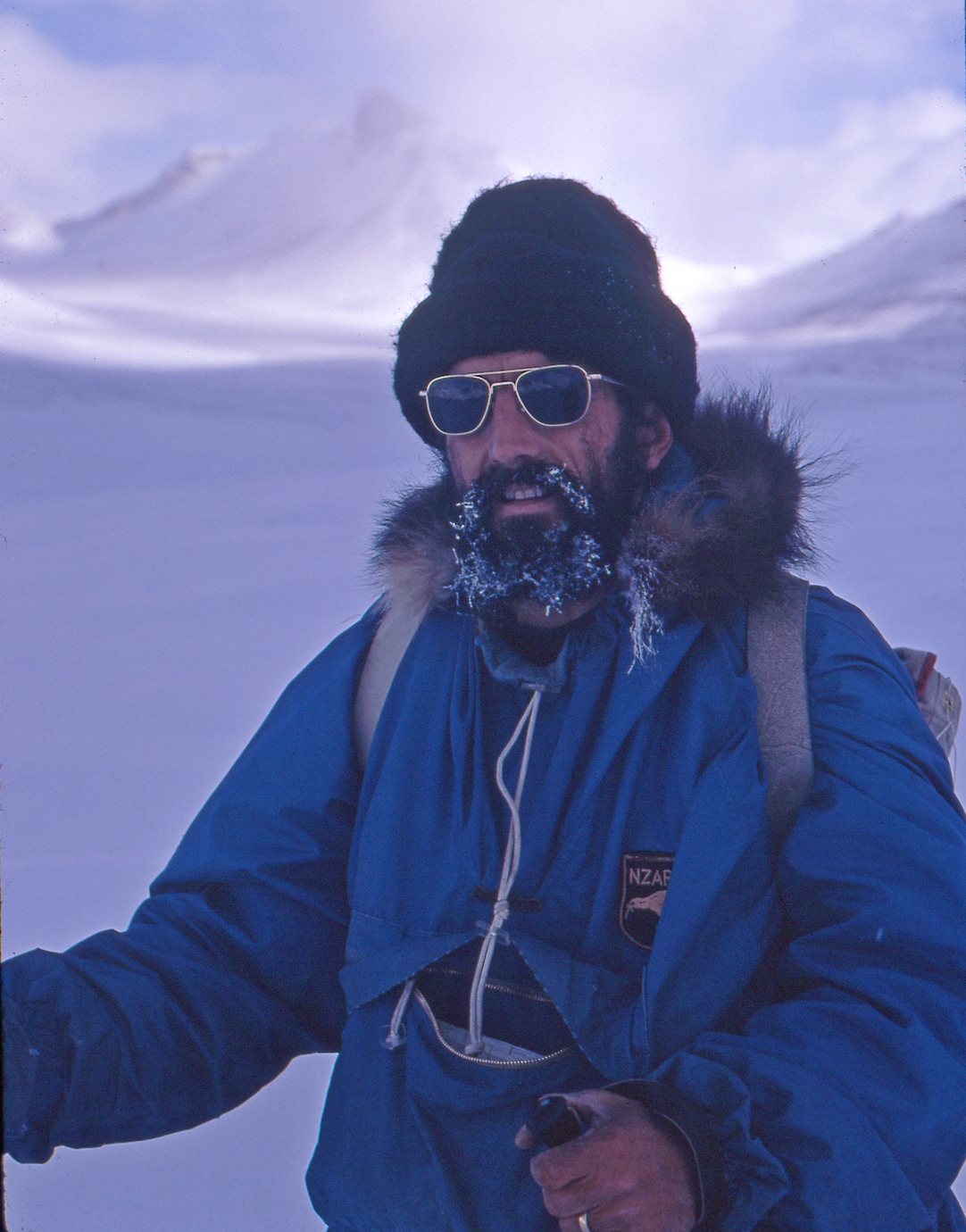

Trevor James Hill Chinn (9 August 1937 – 20 December 2018) was a New Zealand glaciologist, who conducted extensive surveys of the glaciers of New Zealand's Southern Alps.

== Early life ==
Chinn was fascinated by glaciers from an early age, having grown up near the farming settlement of Te Taho (about eight kilometers north of Whataroa) in South Westland, near the Franz Josef Glacier. While at the University of Canterbury Chinn joined the tramping club, and graduated with a BSc in geology. Chinn was the second of four children to Alfred and Myrtle (née Sweney) Chinn.

== Career ==
During the early 1960s Chinn worked for the North Canterbury Catchment Board, near Christchurch. In his role as field hydrologist, Chinn quickly learned the elements of river gauging and meticulous record keeping. Following a training period with the Ministry of Works, Chinn was invited to apply for a field role carrying out snow surveys on the Tasman Glacier and in the wider Mackenzie Basin. This new job was with the Ministry of Works, based in Timaru, South Canterbury. The Ministry of Works were primarily interested in water resources for hydroelectric power schemes in the Mackenzie Basin. A major source of stored water for power generation existed in the form of the Tasman Glacier, New Zealand's longest body of ice (28 kilometres (17 mi) as of 2018). From 1965 to 1970 Chinn, along with several others carried out a series of mass balance estimates of the Tasman Glacier, using traditional snow accumulation and ablation poles. In 1965 UNESCO coincidentally established the International Hydrological Decade (IHD) which aimed to quantify the water resources of contributing nations. The IHD criteria stipulated each nation establish a 'basin analysis' for water resources. Basins could be shallow river catchments or alpine glacier cirques, either way, measuring the water volume into and out of, a basin was the metric to yield information on the earth's stored water. In 1965 New Zealand was invited by the IHD to participate in the programme. By 1967 Chinn identified the small Ivory Glacier as an ideal candidate to carry out mass balance studies. Located at the head of the Waitaha River, Westland, the Ivory Glacier is now a mere remnant of its former cirque basin status. Between 1968 and 1985, the Ivory Glacier programme generated several reports and numerous papers on the mass balance, meteorology and glacial erosion rates During the 1970s Chinn also established a series of rain gauges across the width of the Southern Alps. The rain gauge 'transect' produced a remarkable rainfall profile across the alps with a maximum of 18 metres (59 ft) of rain per annum in the Cropp Basin, adjacent to the Ivory Glacier. By 1975 Chinn had completed an MSc thesis on the glacial geomorphology of the upper Waimakariri River catchment Chinn's thesis was supervised by Professor Max Gage. In 1977, Chinn also took part in the 'World Glacier Inventory' with the goal of documenting Earth's glaciers. The inventory required a suite of parameters be used including; glacier area, elevation range, ice volume and photographic records. At the time, 3140 glaciers existed in New Zealand's South Island. Given this high number of glaciers, Chinn could see that to calculate the total volume of glacial ice in the Southern Alps, it was impossible to measure every glacier. By taking a sub-sample of 51 'index glaciers' Chinn could estimate their ice volumes from aerial photographs of the end of summer snowline (EOSS) elevation. This pioneering method meant that Chinn and colleagues could provide an annual summary of ice volume. Today, the snowline data set consists of 41 years of climate data and climbing. In 2008, Chinn co-authored a paper noting that – since this initial survey – New Zealand's glaciers had lost 15 percent of their total volume. A subsequent publication in 2014 noted that the loss of ice had now grown to 34 percent.

Chinn's career spanned more than 60 years, working in New Zealand and Antarctica, and included work at the Ministry of Works and Development, DSIR Geological Survey (which became GNS Science in 1992) and NIWA. From the early 2000s Chinn became a consultant under the name Alpine and Polar Processes Consultancy, working from his home at Lake Hāwea township, Central Otago.

== Awards and honours ==
Chinn was awarded a Doctor of Science (DSc) degree in 2007 from his alma mater and in 1998 a small glacier in Antarctica was named Chinn Glacier in his honour. In 2016 The International Glaciological Society awarded Chinn the Richardson Medal.
