= Clare Range =

Mountain range in Victoria Land, Antarctica

- Location within Antarctica

Highest point
- Elevation: 1,456 m (4,777 ft)

Geography
- Continent: Antarctica
- Region: Victoria Land
- Range coordinates: 77°10′S 161°11′E

The Clare Range (77°10′S 161°11′E) is the range extending west-southwest from Sperm Bluff to the Willett Range on the south side of Mackay Glacier, in Victoria Land, Antarctica. It is south of the Convoy Range and north of the Olympus Range.

== Exploration and name ==
The Clare Range was circumnavigated in 1957 by the New Zealand Northern Survey Party of the Commonwealth Trans-Antarctic Expedition (CTAE; 1956–58), and named by them after Clare College, Cambridge, England.

== Location ==
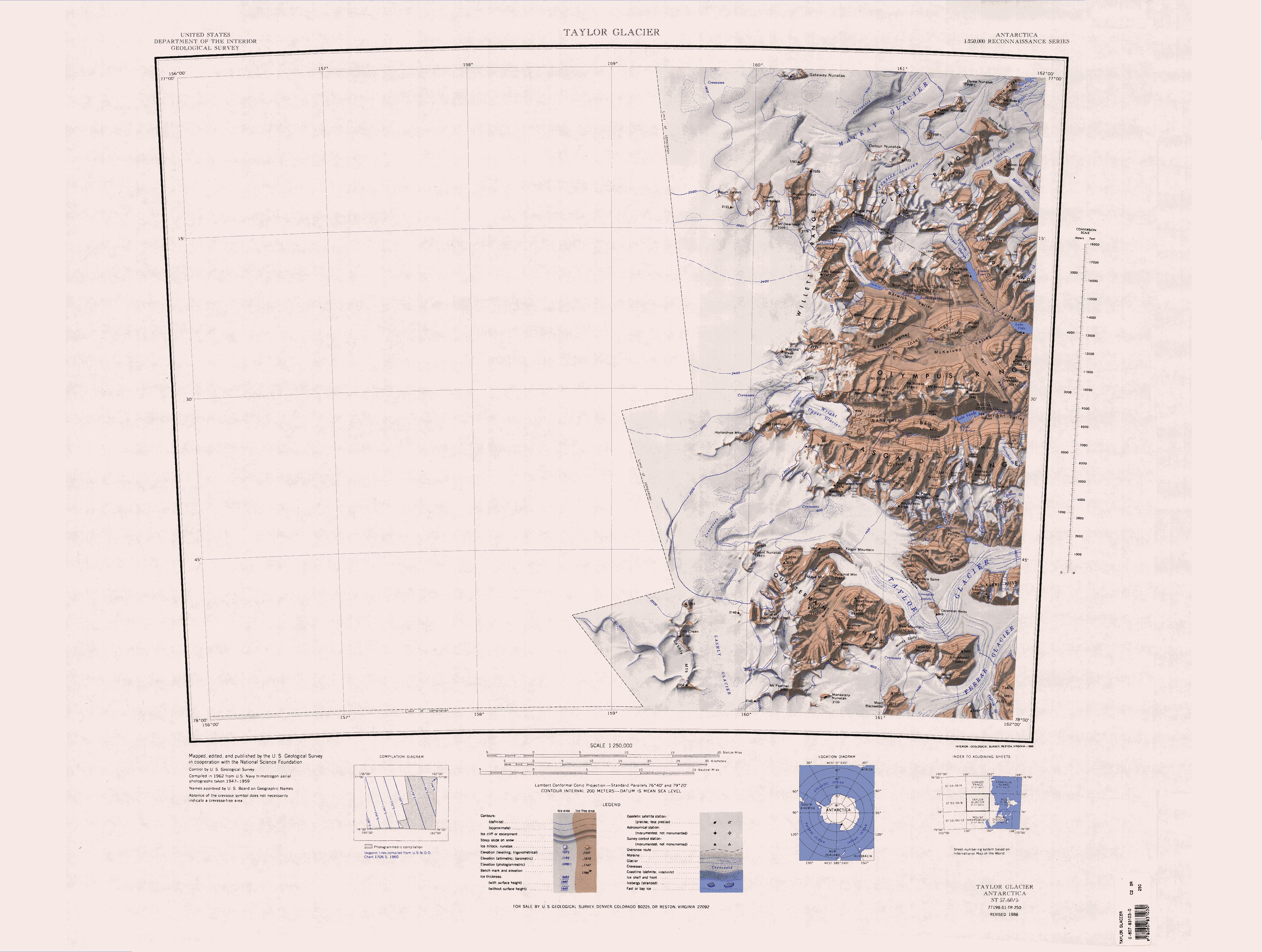
Clare Range in north of mapped region

The Clare Range runs in an east-northeast direction to the south of the Frazier Glacier and Mackay Glacier. The Willett Range is to its east. The head of the Webb Glacier and Victoria Upper Névé separate it from the Cruzen Range to the south. The eastern part of the range is north of the Saint Johns Range and Cotton Glacier.

== Features ==
Named features, from southwest to northeast, include Vishniac Peak, Skew Peak, Parker Mesa, Dykes Peak, Heaphy Spur, Detour Nunatak and Sperm Bluff.

=== Vishniac Peak ===
77°14′S 160°31′E. A peak 2,280 metres (7,480 ft) high which rises just north of the head of Webb Glacier and 3 nautical miles (5.6 km; 3.5 mi) southwest of Skew Peak. Mapped by USGS from surveys and United States Navy aerial photography, 1947-62. Named by US-ACAN for Wolf V. Vishniac (1922-73), professor of biology at the University of Rochester, New York, who made Antarctic studies (1971-72 and 1973) on the water absorption of soil particles and its microbiological significance, and the ability of microorganisms to withstand a hostile milieu. Doctor Vishniac fell to his death in the Asgard Range, upper Wright Valley, 20 nautical miles (37 km; 23 mi) south of this peak, on December 11, 1973.

=== Skew Peak ===
77°13′S 160°42′E. A mountain, 2,535 metres (8,317 ft) high, just west of the head of Frazier Glacier, in the Clare Range. So named in 1957 by the Northern Survey Party of the CTAE (1956-58) because the summit is notably asymmetrical from all directions.

=== Springtail Point ===
77°10′S 160°42′E. A rock point 3 nautical miles (5.6 km; 3.5 mi) north of Skew Peak in the Clare Range, Victoria Land. So named by Heinz Janetschek, biologist at McMurdo Station (1961-62), because of a find of springtail insects at this location.

=== Molnia Bluff ===
77.265108°S 160.946302°E A steep bluff rising to 1,750 metres (5,740 ft) high and extending west–east for 1 nautical mile (1.9 km; 1.2 mi) at the southeast end of Parker Mesa, Clare Range, Victoria Land. The elevation drops to 1,350 metres (4,430 ft) high at the foot of the bluff. Named by Advisory Committee on Antarctic Names (US-ACAN) (2005) after Bruce Franklin Molnia, United States Geological Survey (USGS) geologist who conducted seismic studies in the Southern Ocean and Antarctic marginal seas from R.V. Eltanin, 1965-66; Acting Executive Director of the Polar Research Board of the National Research Council, National Academy of Sciences, 1985-87; Chief, International Polar Programs, United States Geological Survey (USGS), 1987-2002; Research Geologist, United States Geological Survey (USGS), 2002-05.

=== Parker Mesa ===
77°15′S 160°55′E. A prominent snow covered mesa 4 nautical miles (7.4 km; 4.6 mi) southeast of Skew Peak, in the south part of Clare Range. This high, flattish feature was named by US-ACAN for Bruce C. Parker, United States ArmyRP biologist who conducted limnological studies at Antarctic Peninsula (1969-70) and in Victoria Land (1973-74 and 1974-75).

=== Dykes Peak ===
77°13′S 161°01′E. A peak 2,220 metres (7,280 ft) high at the head of Victoria Upper Glacier, 4 nautical miles (7.4 km; 4.6 mi) east of Skew Peak. Mapped by USGS from surveys and United States Navy aerial photographs, 1947-62. Named by US-ACAN (1974) for Leonard H. Dykes who was associated for nearly 20 years with the successive Antarctic co-ordinating committees within the United States Government.

=== Jatko Peak ===
77.189112°S 161.003146°E A sharp-pointed peak, 2,050 metres (6,730 ft) high, 1.75 nautical miles (3.24 km; 2.01 mi) northwest of Dykes Peak. Named by Advisory Committee on Antarctic Names (US-ACAN) (2007) after Joyce A. Jatko, Environmental Officer for the National Science Foundation’s Office of Polar Programs, 1994--2003; United States representative to the SCAR Committee for Environmental Protection and Vice Chair of the Committee for two terms.

=== Heaphy Spur ===
77°14′S 161°15′E. A prominent, curved, rock spur, 4 nautical miles (7.4 km; 4.6 mi) long, which descends from the southern side of Clare Range and divides the head of Victoria Upper Glacier. Mapped by USGS from surveys and United States Navy aerial photography, 1947-62. Named by US-ACAN (1974) after William Heaphy, a New Zealand citizen who, over the past 10 years, participated in the United States Antarctic Research Program.

=== Sperm Bluff ===
77°05′S 161°36′E. A prominent dark bluff, 3 nautical miles (5.6 km; 3.5 mi) long and over 1,000 metres (3,300 ft) high, forming the northeast extremity of Clare Range. Charted and named by the BrAE, 1910-13. When viewed from the east, the north face of the bluff suggests the blunt head of a sperm whale.

== Sources ==
- Alberts, Fred G., ed. (1995), Geographic Names of the Antarctic (PDF) (2 ed.), United States Board on Geographic Names This article incorporates public domain material from websites or documents of the United States Board on Geographic Names.
- "Jatko Peak", Geographic Names Information System, United States Geological Survey, United States Department of the Interior
- "Molnia Bluff", Geographic Names Information System, United States Geological Survey, United States Department of the Interior
- Taylor Glacier, USGS: United States Geological Survey

This article incorporates public domain material from websites or documents of the United States Geological Survey.
