= Willett Range =

Mountain range in Victoria Land, Antarctica

- Location within Antarctica

Highest point
- Elevation: 2,449 m (8,035 ft)

Geography
- Continent: Antarctica
- Region: Victoria Land
- Range coordinates: 77°18′S 160°25′E

The Willett Range (77°18′S 160°25′E) is the range extending north from Mistake Peak and running for 20 nautical miles (37 km; 23 mi) as a high shelf along the edge of the continental ice to the Mackay Glacier, in Victoria Land. The range is breached by several glaciers flowing east from the plateau.

== Name ==
The Willett Range was named by the New Zealand Northern Survey Party of the Commonwealth Trans-Antarctic Expedition (CTAE; 1956–58) for R.W. Willett, Director of the New Zealand Geological Survey, who gave valuable assistance throughout the expedition and in the compilation stages after its return.

== Location ==
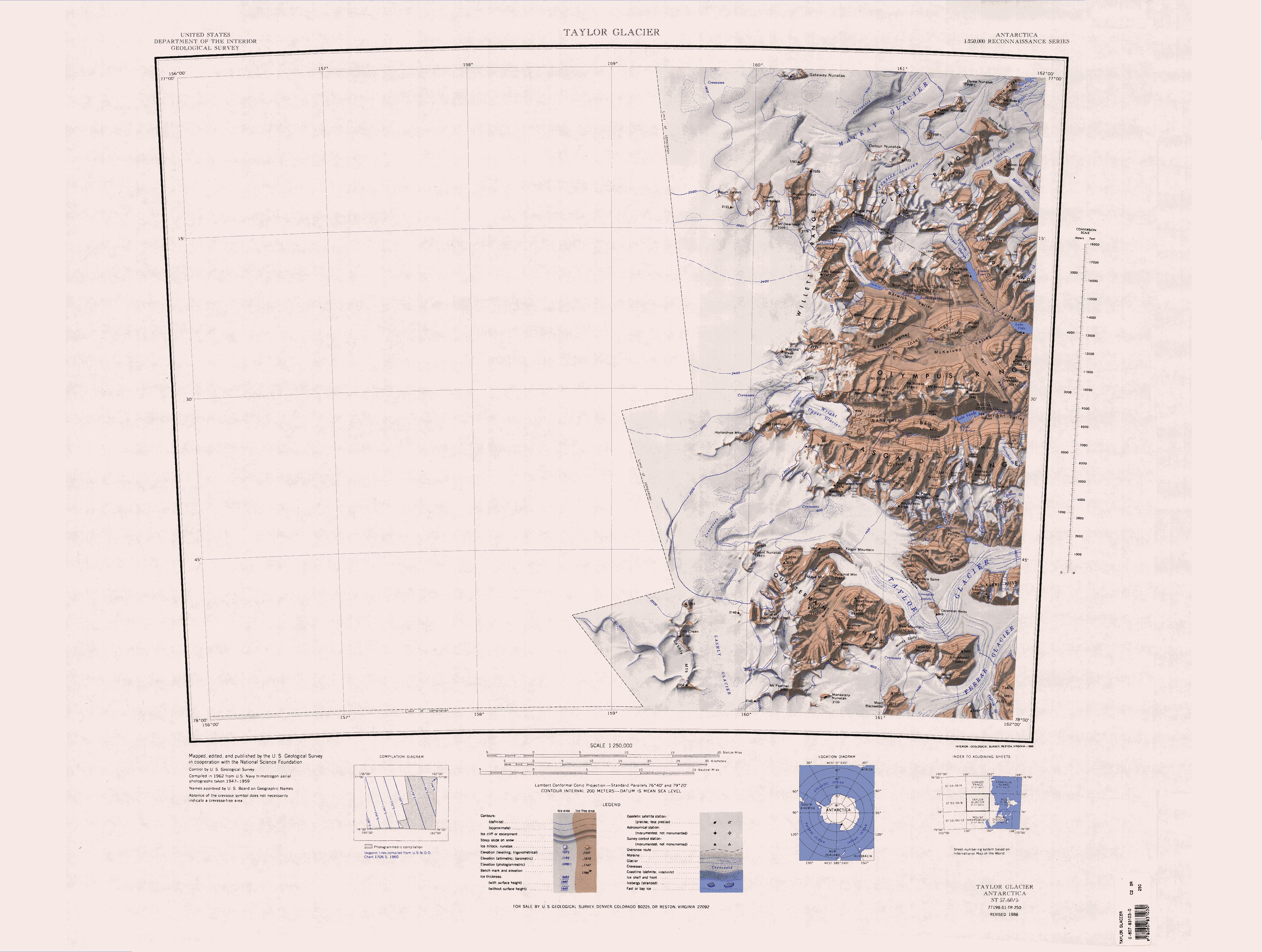
Olympus Range north of center of mapped region

The Willet Range runs from south to north along the eastern side of the Antarctic Plateau. It is north of Wright Upper Glacier and the Olympus Range, and west of Balham Valley, the Apocalypse Peaks, Barwick Valley, the Cruzen Range, and Clare Range. The head of the Mackay Glacier is to the north.

== Head Mountains ==
77.194941°S 160.170517°E. A group of mountains to the south of Gateway Nunatak and the head of Mackay Glacier near the interior ice plateau of Victoria Land. From west to east the group includes Mount DeWitt, Mount Littlepage, Mount Dearborn and Coalbed Mountain. Named by the Advisory Committee on Antarctic Names (US-ACAN, 2007) after James W. Head III, Department of Geological Sciences, Brown University, Providence, RI, internationally known planetary scientist whose investigations in McMurdo Dry Valleys 2002-06 have led to important advances to the concept of Antarctica as an analog of Martian features.

=== Mount DeWitt ===
77°12′S 159°50′E. Mountain, 2,190 metres (7,190 ft) high, rising above the ice plateau just west of Mount Littlepage and Willett Range. Named by US-ACAN in 1964 for Hugh H. DeWitt, scientific leader on the Eltanin, 1962-63, who also served on the Glacier, 1958-59.

=== Mount Littlepage ===
77°12′S 160°03′E. Mountain over 2,000 metres (6,600 ft) high, standing between Mount DeWitt and Mount Dearborn, just west of the north end of the Willett Range. Named by US-ACAN for Jack L. Littlepage, biologist at McMurdo Station in 1961, who worked additional summer seasons there, 1959-60 and 1961-62.

=== Pedalling Ice Field ===
77.25°S 159.9166667°E. An icefield composed of blue ice, located at the edge of the polar plateau just south of Mount Dewitt and Mount Littlepage, Vi. The name alludes to the use of a bicycle as a practical means of transportation by a glacial mapping party led by Trevor Chinn, summer season 1992-93, and is part of a theme of cycling names in the area. Approved by New Zealand Geographic Board (NZGB) in 1995.

=== Mount Dearborn ===
77°14′S 160°08′E. A mountain, 2,300 metres (7,500 ft) high, between Mount Littlepage and the north part of the Willett Range. Named by the US-ACAN in 1964, for John Dearborn, biologist at McMurdo Station, 1959 and 1961.

=== Cycle Glacier ===
77.155923°S 160.309142°E. A glacier, 6 kilometres (3.7 mi) long and 2 kilometres (1.2 mi) wide, flowing north from the polar plateau between Mount Dearborn and Robinson Peak into Mackay Glacier. Approved by New Zealand Geographic Board (NZGB) in 1995. The name is part of a theme of cycling names in the area.

=== Coalbed Mountain ===
77.197882°S 160.294672°E. An ice-free mountain rising to 2,230 metres (7,320 ft) at Robison Peak located between Cycle Glacier and Rim Glacier in eastern Head Mountains. So named by Advisory Committee on Antarctic Names (US-ACAN) (2007) in association with coal beds discovered in rock strata of the mountain.

=== Robison Peak ===
77°12′S 160°15′E. A snow-covered peak, 2,230 metres (7,320 ft) high, standing 3 nautical miles (5.6 km; 3.5 mi) northeast of Mount Dearborn, near the north end of the Willett Range. Named by US-ACAN for Leslie B. Robison, USGS civil engineer who surveyed the peak, December 1960.

=== Rim Glacier ===
77.204141°S 160.439435°E. Description: Glacier, 10 kilometres (6.2 mi) long and 2 kilometres (1.2 mi) wide, flowing north from the polar plateau in a deep valley between Robison Peak and Vishniac Peak into Mackay Glacier. The name is part of a theme of cycling names in the area. Approved by New Zealand Geographic Board (NZGB) in 1995.

=== Mulligan Peak ===
77°11′S 160°15′E. An ice-free peak 1 nautical mile (1.9 km; 1.2 mi) north of Robison Peak, at the north end of Willett Range. Named by US-ACAN for John J. Mulligan of the United States Bureau of Mines, who scaled this peak and the peak to the south of it during December 1960 and found coal beds and fossil wood.

== Southern features ==
Southern named features in or near the range include:

=== Metcalf Spur ===
77.4125°S 160.405556°E A rock spur, 1.5 nautical miles (2.8 km; 1.7 mi) long, which extends from Shapeless Mountain northwest to Pākira Nunatak on the plateau of Willett Range. Named by US-ACAN (2005) after Altie Metcalf, Budget and Planning Officer, Office of Polar Programs, National Science Foundation, 1995-2005.

=== Gabites Glacier ===
77.346792°S 160.533966°E A glacier on the headwall of Caffin Valley, 0.3 nautical miles (0.56 km; 0.35 mi) west of the head of Walker Glacier. Named by the New Zealand Geographic Board (2005) after Isobel (Helen) Gabites, a member of the Victoria University's Antarctic Expeditions (VUWAE) geological party at Mount Bastion and Allan Hills, 1982-83.

=== Gibson Spur ===
77°20′S 160°40′E. A high rocky spur just west of the mouth of Webb Glacier. Named by the Victoria University of Wellington Antarctic Expedition (VUWAE) (1959-60) after G.W. Gibson, one of the party's geologists.

=== Mount Bastion ===
77°19′S 160°29′E. Mountain, 2,530 metres (8,300 ft) high, standing west of Webb Glacier and Gibson Spur, where the interior ice plateau meets the Willett Range. Named by the VUWAE (1959-60) for its buttresslike appearance.

=== Ormerod Terrace ===
77.308381°S 160.57471°E A ramplike rock platform, 2 nautical miles (3.7 km; 2.3 mi) long, that parallels the south flank of McSaveney Spur, Willett Range, and declines moderately toward the Webb Glacier. The terrace has a median elevation of 1,600 metres (5,200 ft) high and rises 300 metres (980 ft) high above Caffin Valley (q.v.). Named by US-ACAN (2005) after Robin Ormerod, editor 1984-95 of Antarctic, the widely read publication of the New Zealand Antarctic Society.

=== Welch Crag ===
77.285268°S 160.586099°E A steep rugged peak, which is marked by secondary spires rising to 1,500 metres (4,900 ft) high in the northeast part of McSaveney Spur. Named by Advisory Committee on Antarctic Names (US-ACAN) (2005) after Kathleen A. Welch, Department of Geology, University of Alabama, Tuscaloosa, AL; team member in United States Antarctic Project (USAP) McMurdo Dry Valleys Long-Term Ecological Research, 11 field seasons 1994-2004.

=== McSaveney Spur ===
77°17′S 160°35′E. A prominent rock spur 2 nautical miles (3.7 km; 2.3 mi) northeast of Mount Bastion. The spur descends northeast from the plateau level toward the northwest flank of Webb Glacier. Named by United States Advisory Committee on Antarctic Names (US-ACAN) for Maurice J. McSaveney and Eileen R. McSaveney, husband and wife geologists who made investigations of Meserve Glacier and the Wright Valley area, he in 1968-69, 1972-73 and 1973-74; she in 1969-70 and 1972-73.

== Nunataks ==
Nunataks on the Willet Range plateau include:

=== Pākira Nunatak ===
77.4008333°S 160.3797222°E A nunatak, 2,400 metres (7,900 ft) high, at the north end of Metcalf Spur on the plateau of Willett Range. The nunatak is 1.75 nautical miles (3.24 km; 2.01 mi) northwest of Shapeless Mountain. “Pākira” is a Maori word, meaning bald head, and was applied descriptively to this nunatak in 2005 by the New Zealand Geographic Board.

=== Clegg Nunataks ===
77.378983°S 160.598609°E A nunatak group, 1.4 nautical miles (2.6 km; 1.6 mi) long, lying above (southwest of) Haselton Icefall in the upper part of Haselton Glacier. Named by the New Zealand Geographic Board (2005) after Keith Clegg, Information Officer, Antarctic Division, Department of Scientific and Industrial Research, 1979-88.

=== Totoa Nunatak ===
77.320793°S 160.423118°E A nunatak at the southwest end of the Moremore Nunataks, 0.8 nautical miles (1.5 km; 0.92 mi) west of Mount Bastion, on the plateau of the Willett Range. “Totoa” is a Maori wind word, meaning boisterous and stormy, and was applied descriptively to this nunatak in 2005 by the New Zealand Geographic Board.

=== Moremore Nunataks ===
77.307734°S 160.455937°E A nunatak group 2 nautical miles (3.7 km; 2.3 mi) long, immediately west of McSaveney Spur and Mount Bastion on the plateau of Willett Range. “Moremore” is a Maori word, meaning bald head, and was applied descriptively to these nunataks in 2005 by the New Zealand Geographic Board.

== Sources ==
- Alberts, Fred G., ed. (1995), Geographic Names of the Antarctic (PDF) (2 ed.), United States Board on Geographic Names This article incorporates public domain material from websites or documents of the United States Board on Geographic Names.
- "Clegg Nunataks", Geographic Names Information System, United States Geological Survey, United States Department of the Interior
- "Coalbed Mountain", Geographic Names Information System, United States Geological Survey, United States Department of the Interior
- "Cycle Glacier", Geographic Names Information System, United States Geological Survey, United States Department of the Interior
- "Gabites Glacier", Geographic Names Information System, United States Geological Survey, United States Department of the Interior
- "Head Mountains", Geographic Names Information System, United States Geological Survey, United States Department of the Interior
- "Metcalf Spur", Geographic Names Information System, United States Geological Survey, United States Department of the Interior
- "Moremore Nunataks", Geographic Names Information System, United States Geological Survey, United States Department of the Interior
- "Ormerod Terrace", Geographic Names Information System, United States Geological Survey, United States Department of the Interior
- "Pākira Nunatak", Geographic Names Information System, United States Geological Survey, United States Department of the Interior
- "Pedalling Ice Field", Geographic Names Information System, United States Geological Survey, United States Department of the Interior
- "Rim Glacier", Geographic Names Information System, United States Geological Survey, United States Department of the Interior
- Taylor Glacier, USGS: United States Geological Survey
- "Totoa Nunatak", Geographic Names Information System, United States Geological Survey, United States Department of the Interior
- "Welch Crag", Geographic Names Information System, United States Geological Survey, United States Department of the Interior

This article incorporates public domain material from websites or documents of the United States Geological Survey.
