= Towle Valley =

Valley in Antarctica

Towle Valley (76°41′S 160°45′E) is the deep valley formerly occupied by the head of Towle Glacier, lying immediately west of Towle Glacier in the Convoy Range of Victoria Land, Antarctica.

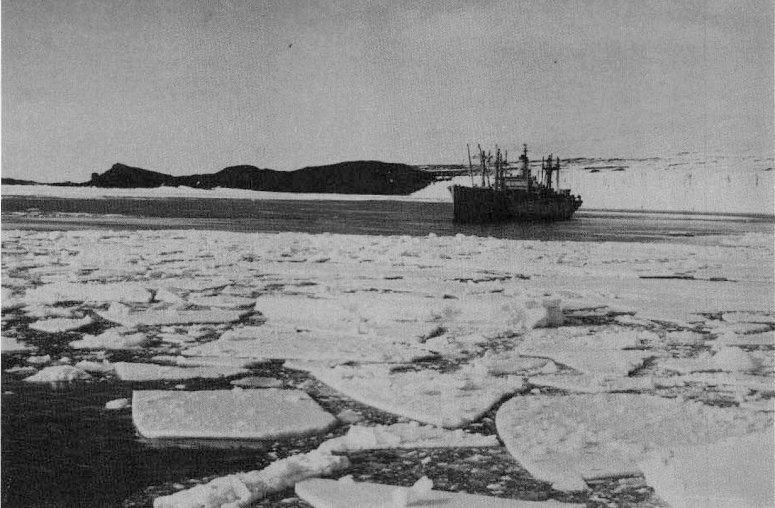
USNS Private John R. Towle underway in pack ice near Antarctica.

== Exploration and naming ==
Towle Valley was mapped in 1957 by the New Zealand Northern Survey Party of the Commonwealth Trans-Antarctic Expedition (1956–58). It was named by them for the USNS Private John R. Towle, an American freighter which carried a large part of the New Zealand stores south in December 1956.

== Features ==
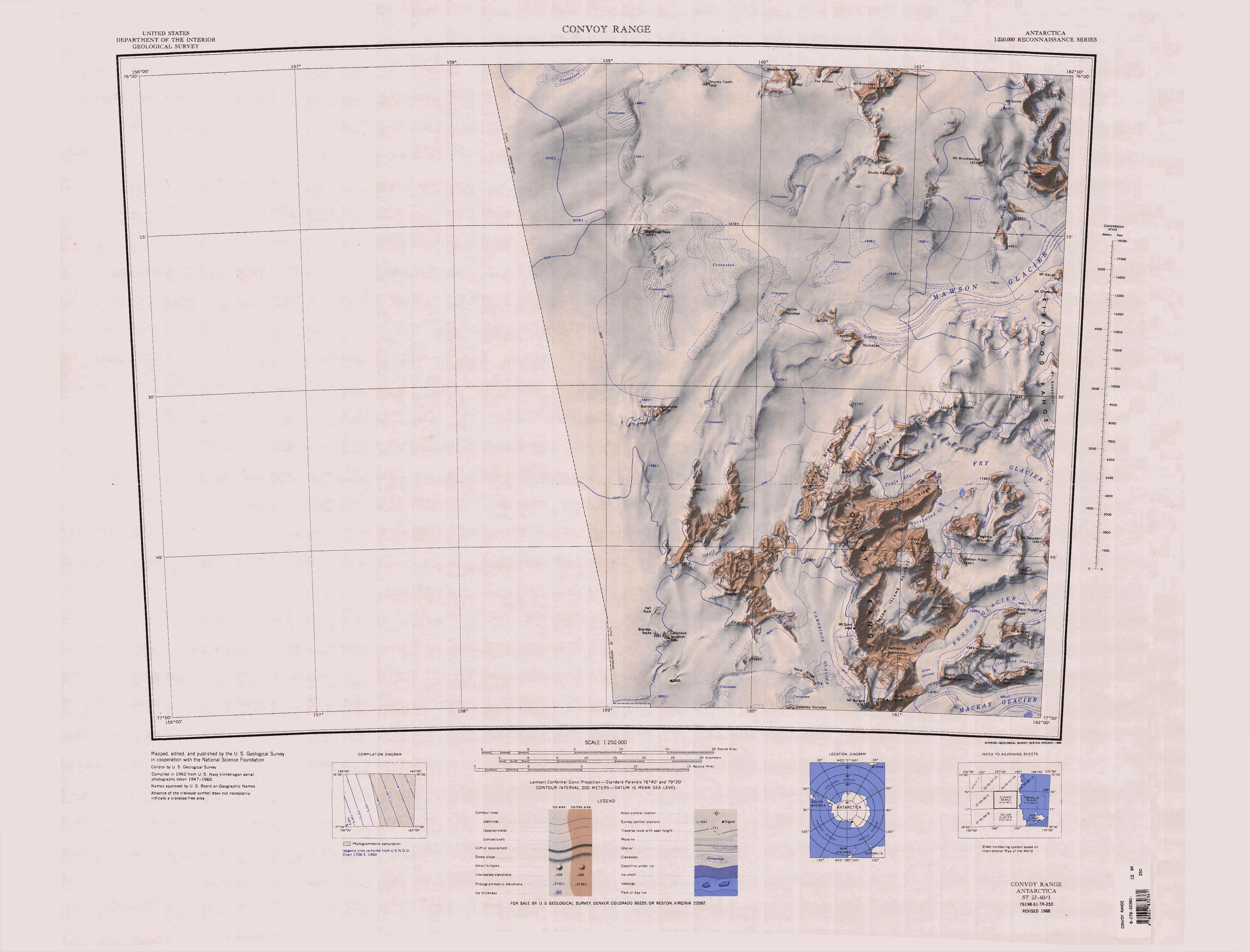
Towle Glacier, tributary of Fry Glacier, in south center of map

The glacier runs east of northeast to Fry Glacier between Elkhorn Ridge to the south and Eastwind Ridge to the north. The valley is at its former head. Features include

=== Hurricane Heights ===
76°44′S 160°40′E. The irregular, mainly ice-free heights which rise to about 2,000 metres (6,600 ft) at the south side of the head of Towle Valley. The name was applied by a 1989-90 NZARP field party to describe the windy aspect of this upland area.

=== Mount Shadbolt ===
76°41′S 160°28′E. The highest summit, 2,270 metres (7,450 ft) high, in the north part of the Convoy Range, standing at the north side of the head of Towle Valley. Named by the 1976-77 Victoria University's Antarctic Expeditions (VUWAE), led by Christopher J. Burgess, after New Zealand author Maurice Shadbolt.

== Sources ==
- Alberts, Fred G., ed. (1995), Geographic Names of the Antarctic (PDF) (2 ed.), United States Board on Geographic Names This article incorporates public domain material from websites or documents of the United States Board on Geographic Names.
- Convoy Range, USGS: United States Geological Survey

This article incorporates public domain material from websites or documents of the United States Geological Survey.
