= Staten Island Heights =

Upland in Victoria Land, Antarctica

- Location within Antarctica

Highest point
- Coordinates: 76°49′S 160°57′E

Geography
- Location: Victoria Land, Antarctica

Staten Island Heights (76°49′S 160°57′E) is a predominantly flat, ice-covered upland between Greenville Valley and Alatna Valley in the Convoy Range of Victoria Land, Antarctica.

== Exploration and naming ==
Staten Island Heights were mapped by the United States Geological Survey (USGS) from ground surveys and Navy air photos. They were named by the Advisory Committee on Antarctic Names (US-ACAN) in 1964 for the USS Staten Island, an icebreaker in the American convoy to McMurdo Sound in several seasons beginning in 1956–57.

== Location ==
The Staten Island Heights are in the center of the Convoy Range. To the east is the Flight Deck Névé, which feeds the Benson Glacier, Northwind Glacier and Atka Glacier. The Elkhorn Ridge is to the north, the Cambridge Glacier to the west and Battleship Promontory and Alatna Valley to the south. Prominent peaks include Mount Gunn, Larson Crag and Mount Razorback.

== Features ==
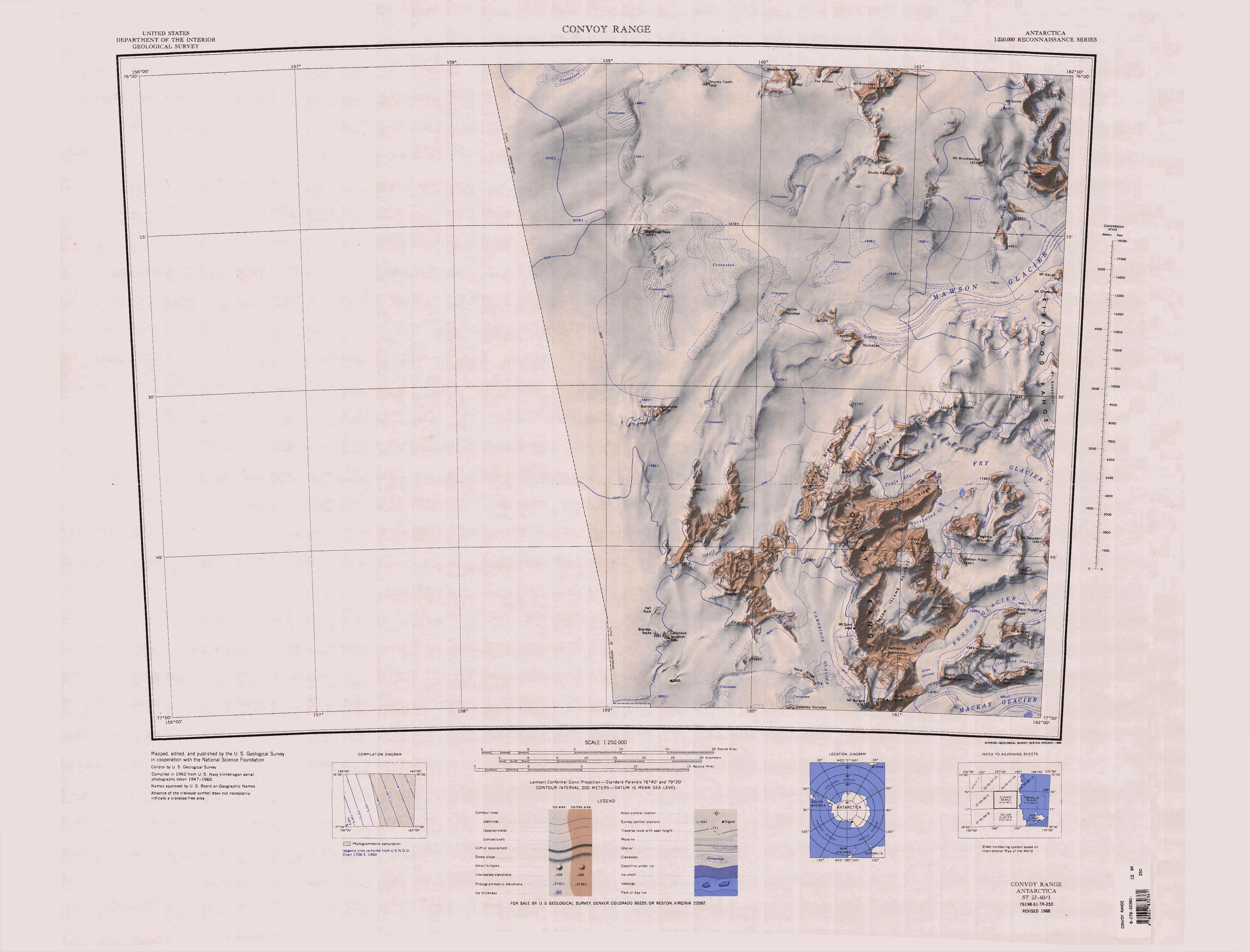
Convoy Range is south center of map

Named features in and around the heights include:

=== Battleship Promontory ===
76°55′S 160°55′E. A sandstone promontory which rises from the floor of Alatna Valley near its head. The name was suggested by Parker Calkin, United States geologist who made stratigraphic studies in the valley in the 1960-61 season.

=== Schwall Peak ===
76.85°S 160.9°E. A rock summit rising to 1,550 metres (5,090 ft) west of Sharpend Glacier. The feature forms the extremity of a rock ledge at the south edge of Staten Island Heights. Named by Advisory Committee on Antarctic Names (US-ACAN) (1999) after Captain Karen Schwall, the first female U.S. Army Officer in Antarctica, who specialized in logistics and air and ship operations, 1988-91. She became the Logistics Manager with Antarctic Support Associates, 1991-96, and was central during the transfer of the supply and transportation logistics from the military to the civilian support.

=== Mount Basurto ===
76°56′00″S 160°42′00″E is an ice-free mountain rising to 2,000 metres (6,600 ft) at the south end of Noring Terrace. Named by the US-ACAN (2007) after Juan Basurto, cargo specialist, and a member of the U.S. Antarctic Program logistics operation, who contributed to the movement of science team cargo to and from McMurdo Station in 21 austral field seasons from 1986 through 2007.

=== Noring Terrace ===
76.8166667°S 160.6666667°E. A relatively level ice-covered terrace rising to 2,000 metres (6,600 ft) with an area of about 4 square miles (10 km^{2}) between Mount Gunn and Mount Basurto. Ice from the terrace drains westward into Cambridge Glacier and also eastward in the short Scudding Glacier toward Battleship Promontory. Named by US-ACAN (2007) after Randy (Crunch) Noring who served 16 summer seasons and two winters in Antarctica between 1991 and 2007 at the South Pole and McMurdo Stations, working in operations, heavy equipment and fuels, and since 1999 as the Camp Manager at Marble Point.

=== Mount Gunn ===
76°52′S 160°42′E. Massive mountain, 2,465 metres (8,087 ft) high, standing in the Convoy Range about 7 nautical miles (13 km; 8.1 mi) northwest of Mount Gran. Photographed in 1957 by the New Zealand Northern Survey Party of the Commonwealth Trans-Antarctic Expedition (CTAE) (1956-58) and named by them for Bernard M. Gunn, a member of the party.

=== Forecastle Summit ===
76°46′S 161°08′E. The highest mountain summit, 2,040 metres (6,690 ft) high, in the north part of Staten Island Heights, with a rounded top that gives a commanding view of Fry Glacier and Benson Glacier. One of the nautical names in Convoy Range. So named by a NZARP field party in the 1989-90 season.

=== Pascoe Glacier ===
76°46′S 161°01′E. A cirque glacier, 1.5 nautical miles (2.8 km; 1.7 mi) long, which flows into Greenville Valley from the north end of Staten Island Heights. The name was applied by geologist Christopher J. Burgess, VUWAE party leader in the 1976-77 season. Named after John D. Pascoe (1909-72), New Zealand mountaineer, photographer, and author of books on New Zealand mountains and alpine subjects; Chief Archivist, Department of Internal Affairs, 1963.

=== Larson Crag ===
76°44′S 161°08′E. A prominent rocky summit, over 1,600 metres (5,200 ft) high, at the north end of Staten Island Heights. Mapped by the United States Geological Survey (USGS) from ground surveys and Navy air photos. Named by the United States Advisory Committee on Antarctic Names (US-ACAN) in 1964 for Commander Wesley Larson, commanding officer of the USS Staten Island in Antarctic waters, 1959-60.

=== Mount Razorback ===
76°50′S 161°18′E. A craggy mountain rising to about 1,600 metres (5,200 ft) high east of Staten Island Heights. The descriptive name was applied by the 1957 New Zealand Northern Survey Party of the CTAE, 1956-58.

== Sources ==
- Alberts, Fred G., ed. (1995), Geographic Names of the Antarctic (PDF) (2 ed.), United States Board on Geographic Names This article incorporates public domain material from websites or documents of the United States Board on Geographic Names.
- Convoy Range, USGS: United States Geological Survey
- "Mount Basurto", Geographic Names Information System, United States Geological Survey, United States Department of the Interior
- "Noring Terrace", Geographic Names Information System, United States Geological Survey, United States Department of the Interior
- "Schwall Peak", Geographic Names Information System, United States Geological Survey, United States Department of the Interior

This article incorporates public domain material from websites or documents of the United States Geological Survey.
