= Alatna Valley =

Valley in Antarctica

- Location within Antarctica

Geography
- Country: Antarctica
- Coordinates: 76.88°S 161.17°E
- Interactive map of Alatna Valley

Alatna Valley (76°53′S 161°10′E) is an ice-free valley lying 4 nautical miles (7.4 km; 4.6 mi) north of Mount Gran and trending east-northeast for about 10 nautical miles (19 km; 12 mi) along the southeast side of the Convoy Range, Antarctica.

== Exploration and naming ==
Parker Calkin, U.S. geologist, made stratigraphic studies in the valley during the 1960-61 season. Named by US-ACAN in 1963 for the USNS Alatna which participated in Operation Deep Freeze 1958-59 and 1959–60, and in keeping with other ship names in the Convoy Range. (Note: The name is sometimes incorrectly spelled Atlanta Valley)

== Location ==
The Alatna Valley is to the southeast of Staten Island Heights. Benson Glacier flows east from below the east end of the valley. The Gran Glacier flow south from the valley into the Mackay Glacier.

== Glaciers ==
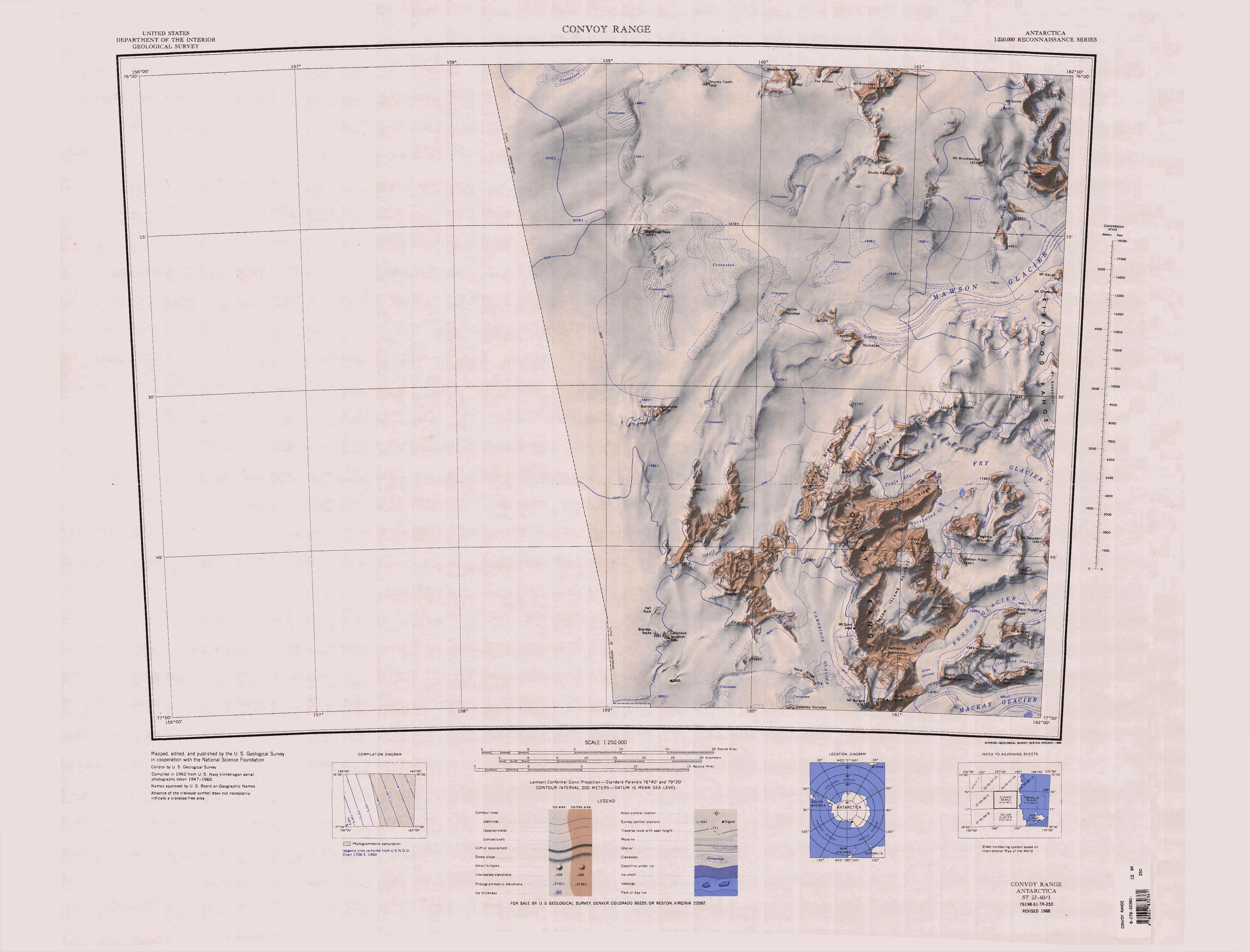
Convoy Range is south center of map

=== Scudding Glacier ===
76°54′S 160°45′E. An abrupt glacier, 3 nautical miles (5.6 km; 3.5 mi) long, descending into the end of Alatna Valley from the south side of Mount Gunn in the Convoy Range. This high elevation glacier is adjacent to the névé of Cambridge Glacier and snow laden katabatic winds make their first descent into Alatna Valley over the glacier. Even on days of relatively light winds, snow clouds derived from the high névé may be seen swirling and scudding down this glacier. So named by the 1989-90 New Zealand Antarctic Research Programme (NZARP) field party to the area.

=== Sharpend Glacier ===
76°52′S 160°56′E. An alpine glacier, 1.5 nautical miles (2.8 km; 1.7 mi) long, which flows into Alatna Valley from the south end of Staten Island Heights. Descriptively named from the pointed terminus of this glacier by a NZARP field party to the area, 1989-90.

=== Wildwind Glacier ===
76°52′S 161°10′E. A substantial mountain glacier, 3 nautical miles (5.6 km; 3.5 mi) wide, which flows southward into Alatna Valley, draining both the Staten Island Heights and Mount Razorback areas. So named by a 1989-90 NZARP field party because strong and persistent winds in this vicinity have cut major flutings through the ice-cliffed terminus of the glacier.

=== Midship Glacier ===
76°52′S 161°30′E. A broad flat glacier filling the bulk of Alatna Valley and having its origin on the slopes of Mount Morrison to the south. From 1957 this ice body was considered part of Benson Glacier. However, it was determined by a 1989-90 NZARP field party (Trevor Chinn) that although it abuts against the main Benson Glacier at Jetsam Moraine, this glacier makes no contribution of ice to the Benson as its dominant ice flow is northward across its length. With the identification of Midship Glacier as a distinct feature, the application of Benson Glacier has been restricted to the ice flowing eastward from Flight Deck Neve" to the terminus in Granite Harbor. Approved by US-ACAN in 1993 as recommended by the NZGB.

=== Lugger Glacier ===
76.9666667°S 160.8333333°E. A broad glacier, 3.6 nautical miles (6.7 km; 4.1 mi) long, which occupies the upland northward of Mount Bergen and Mount Gran and flows north to the head of Alatna Valley. Named by New Zealand Geographic Board (NZGB) (c. 1980) in association with the names of ships grouped in Convoy Range; lugger being a small vessel with four-sided sails.

== Other features ==
=== Cargo Pond ===
76°55′S 161°05′E. A pond in a moraine enclosed basin at the foot of the cliffs to the south end of Alatna Valley, in the Convoy Range of Victoria Land. This frozen pond was the site of a 1960-61 USARP field party (Parker Calkin, Roger Hart, and Ellory Schempp) which had to be evacuated in a hurry. Equipment and provisions stockpiled on the pond ice were eventually redistributed by the wind and lodged among the surrounding morainic boulders. A 1989-90 NZARP party (Trevor Chinn) camped nearby made frequent visits to the site to clean up the area, but also to acquire various 30-year old exotic foods to supplement their standard camp fare.

=== Rum Pond ===
76°54′S 161°07′E. The larger and eastern of two closely spaced frozen ponds in the floor of Alatna Valley. The name is one of a group in Convoy Range reflecting a nautical theme. Named after this traditional naval beverage by a 1989-90 NZARP field party.

=== Tot Pond ===
76°54′S 161°07′E. The smaller and western of two closely spaced frozen ponds in the floor of Alatna Valley, filled by overflow from the larger adjacent Rum Pond. Named by a 1989-90 NZARP field party (Trevor Chinn) in association with Rum Pond; in nautical circles a tot is a traditional small issue of rum.

== Sources ==
- Alberts, Fred G., ed. (1995), Geographic Names of the Antarctic (PDF) (2 ed.), United States Board on Geographic Names This article incorporates public domain material from websites or documents of the United States Board on Geographic Names.
- Convoy Range, USGS: United States Geological Survey
- "Lugger Glacier", Geographic Names Information System, United States Geological Survey, United States Department of the Interior
- "Map of the McMurdo Dry Valleys Area" (PDF), www.antarcticanz.govt.nz, archived from the original (PDF) on December 17, 2008

This article incorporates public domain material from websites or documents of the United States Geological Survey.
