= Matchless Mountain =

Matchless Mountain may refer to:

- Matchless Mountain (Antarctica), a mountain in the Convoy Range, Victoria Land, Antarctica
- Matchless Mountain (Colorado), a mountain in the Elk Mountains, Colorado, USA
