= Convoy Range =

Mountain range in Victoria Land, Antarctica

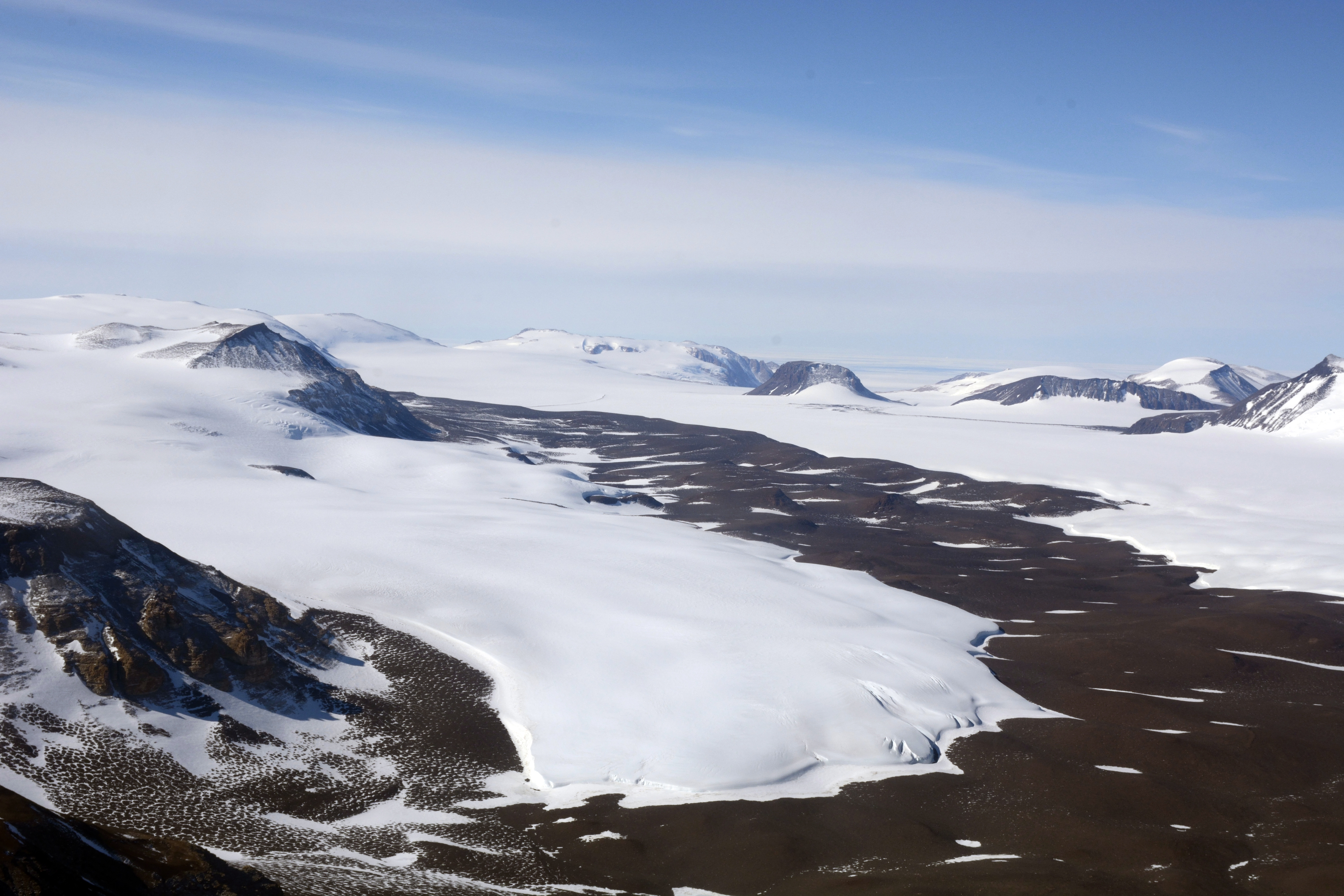
- Alatna Valley in 2014

Highest point
- Coordinates: 76°47′S 160°45′E

Geography
- Location within Antarctica
- Location: Victoria Land, Antarctica

Convoy Range (76°47′S 160°45′E) is a broad range in Antarctica. It is south of the Kirkwood Range and north of the Clare Range.

Much of the range has a nearly flat plateau-like summit. It extends south from the Fry Saddle and ends at Mackay Glacier. The range has steep cliffs on its east side, but it slopes gently into the Cambridge Glacier on the western side. It is a peneplain, with an early Paleozoic granitic basement covered in sedimentary and igneous rocks from the Permian–Triassic to the Jurassic.

== Exploration and naming ==
The New Zealand Northern Survey Party of the Commonwealth Trans-Antarctic Expedition (1956–58) worked in this area in 1957. The party named the range for the main convoy into McMurdo Sound in the 1956–57 season, with the names of the various vessels being used for features in the range.

== Location ==
The Convoy Range is east of the Antarctic Plateau. It extends north to the head of the Fry Glacier at Fry Saddle. The Kirkwood Range is to the northeast, across the Fry Glacier. The Evans Piedmont Glacier on the Ross Sea coast lies to the east of the range. The Mackay Glacier defines the southern limit of the range.

== Geology ==
The region covered by the Convoy Range and Franklin Island to the east has a granitic basement from the early Paleozoic, made up of large bodies of the Granite Harbour Igneous Complex formed in the late Cambrian or early Ordovician, containing small bodies of Wilson Terrane metamorphic rocks. The Wilson Terrane rocks are inferred to be from the Precambrian or Cambrian, deformed and metamorphosed in the Ross Orogeny of the early Paleozoic. The area was uplifted and eroded into a peneplain after the Ross Orogony, and was covered with sandstones of the Beacon Supergroup. These sandstones were intruded by Jurassic Ferrar dolerite, and mostly incorporated into the dolerite.

== Glaciers ==
The Odell Glacier is west of the range, running north past the Coombs Hills and Wyandot Ridge to join the Mawson Glacier. The Chattahoochee Glacier runs northeast from between Wyandot Ridge and Eastwind Ridge in the north of the range, and feeds the Fry Glacier via Fry Saddle. The Fry Glacier flows east along the northern boundary of the range. The Towle Glacier runs northeast between the Eastwind Ridge and Elkhorn Ridge to join the Fry Glacier. The Northwind Glacier flows northeast between Elkhorn Ridge and Flagship Mountain to join the Fry Glacier. The Benson Glacier flows northeast from the eastern end of the Alatna Valley, while the Gran Glacier flow south from the Alatna Valley to join the Mackay Glacier, which flows along the southern boundary of the range. The Cambridge Glacier, a tributary of the Mackay Glacier, forms the southeast boundary of the range, separating it from the Coombs Hills to the west.

== Other features ==
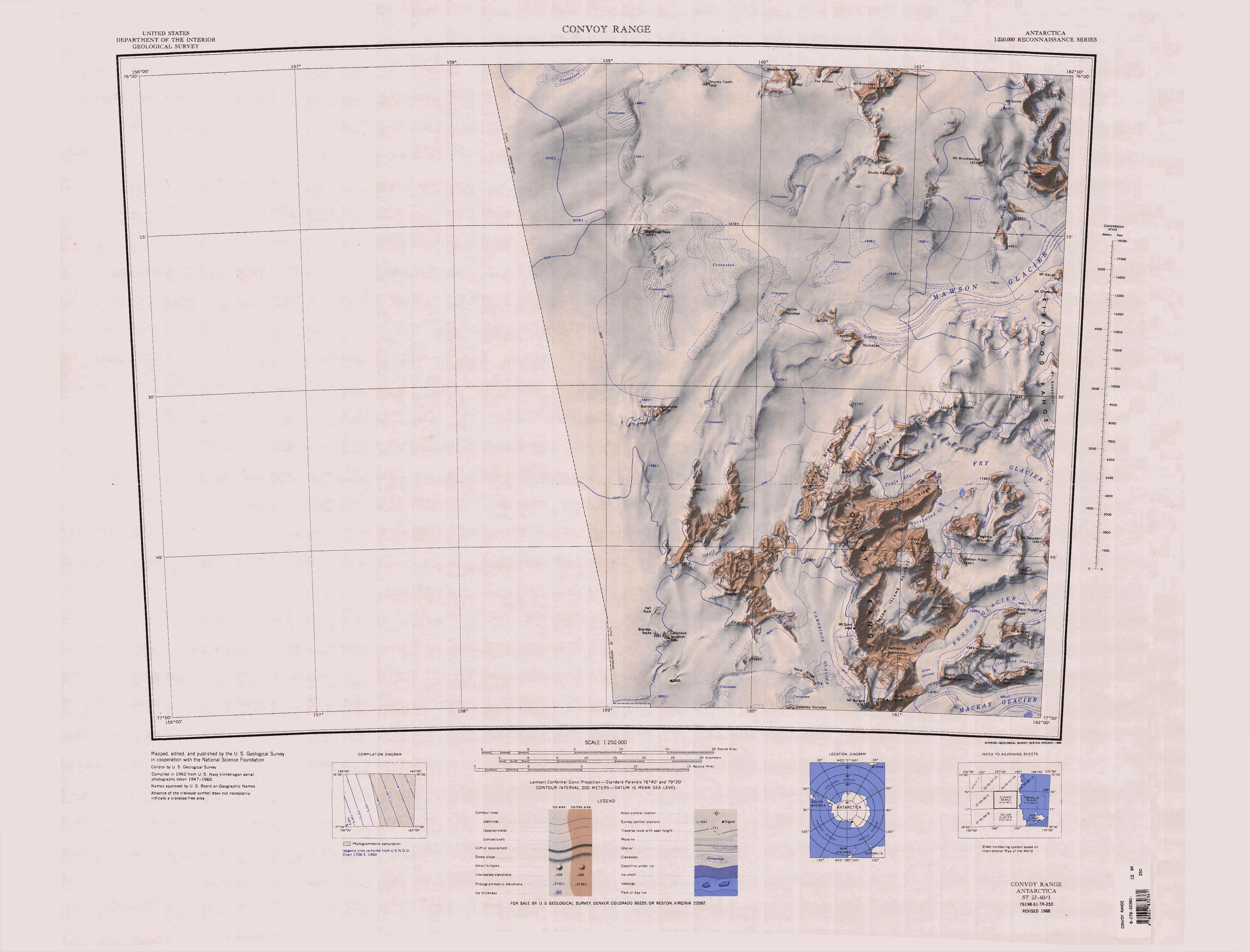
Convoy Range is south center of map

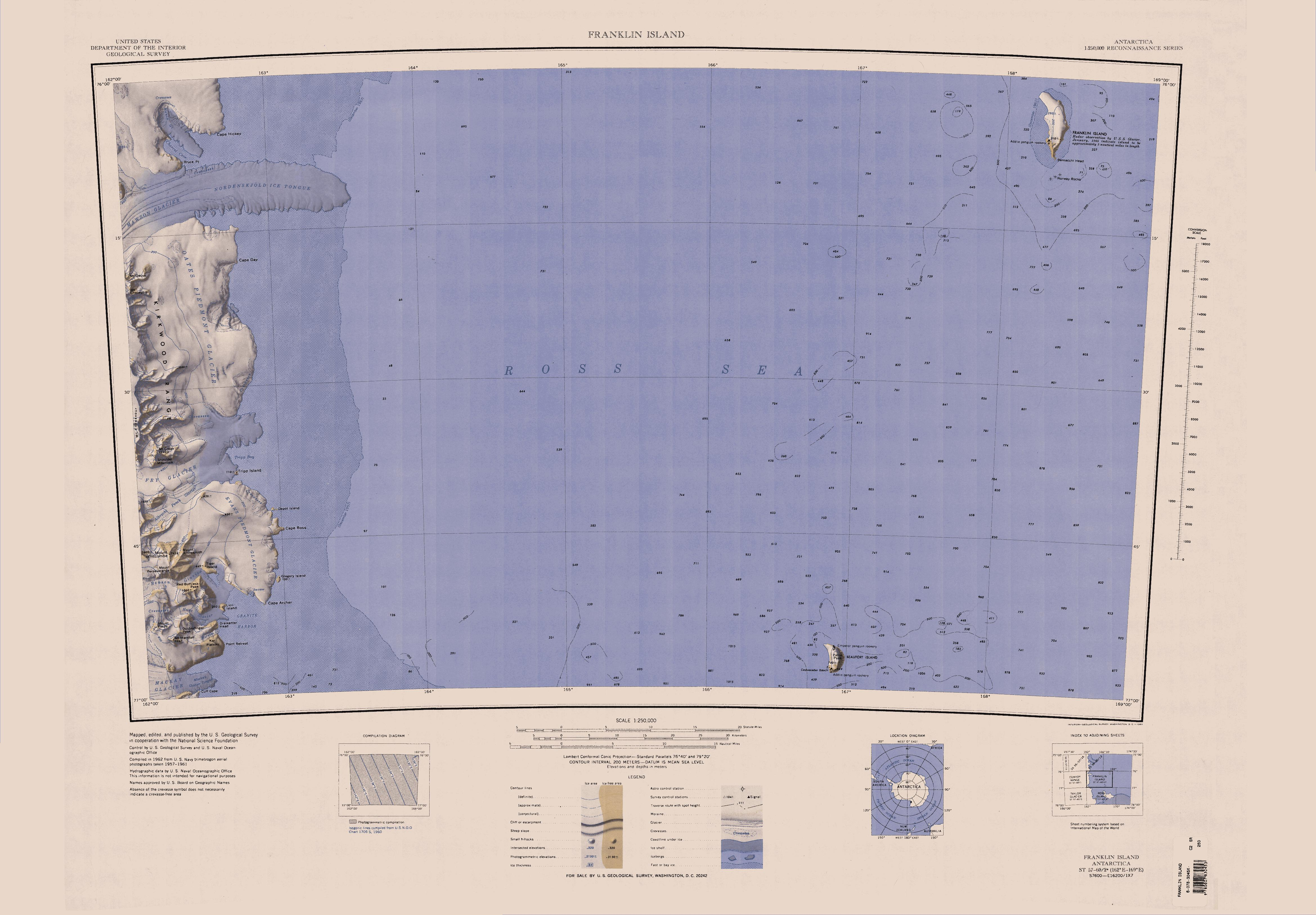
Eastern edge and Evans Piedmont Glacier

Major features include Staten Island Heights in the south of the range, with the Alatna Valley to its southeast, the Wyandot Ridge, Eastwind Ridge, Towle Valley, Elkhorn Ridge and Greenville Valley in the north, and Flagship Mountain in the east.

=== Staten Island Heights ===
76°49′S 160°57′E A predominantly flat, ice-covered upland between Greenville Valley and Alatna Valley in the Convoy Range.

=== Alatna Valley ===
76°53′S 161°10′E. An ice-free valley lying 4 nautical miles (7.4 km; 4.6 mi) north of Mount Gran and trending east-northeast for about 10 nautical miles (19 km; 12 mi) along the southeast side of the Convoy Range.

=== Eastwind Ridge ===
76°36′S 160°47′E. A broad, partially ice-covered ridge about 10 nautical miles (19 km; 12 mi) long between Chattahoochee Glacier and Towle Glacier.

=== Towle Valley ===
76°41′S 160°45′E. The deep valley formerly occupied by the head of Towle Glacier, lying immediately west of Towle Glacier.

=== Greenville Valley ===
76°44′S 160°52′E. The large mainly ice-free valley lying south of Elkhorn Ridge. A lobe of the Northwind Glacier flows a short distance west into the mouth of the valley. Near the head of the valley the south wall is breached by the entrance to Merrell Valley.

=== Flagship Mountain ===
76°43′S 161°30′E). A prominent, conical rock peak, 1,720 metres (5,640 ft) high, surmounting the south part of the large rock mass between Northwind Glacier and Atka Glacier.

== Sources ==
- Alberts, Fred G., ed. (1995), Geographic Names of the Antarctic (PDF) (2 ed.), United States Board on Geographic Names This article incorporates public domain material from websites or documents of the United States Board on Geographic Names.
- Capponi, Giovanni; Montomoli, Chiara; Casale, Stefano; Simonetti, Matteo (8 October 2020), "Geology of the northern Convoy Range, Victoria Land, Antarctica", Journal of Maps, vol. 16, no. 2, pp. 702–709, doi:10.1080/17445647.2020.1822218, hdl:2318/1768289
- Convoy Range, USGS: United States Geological Survey
- Franklin Island, USGS: United States Geological Survey

This article incorporates public domain material from websites or documents of the United States Geological Survey.
