= Karen Schwall =

American army officer

Karen Schwall, also known as Karen Schwall-Meyer, was the first female U.S. Army officer in Antarctica, and the first woman to manage McMurdo Station.

== Biography ==
Karen Schwall was from Crystal Lake, Illinois, and attended the University of Dubuque, where she graduated in 1983.

She joined the U.S. Army, serving at Fort Knox. She then served in Korea, where she was promoted to an Army captain.

In 1988, Schwall served in Antarctica for three years with Naval Support Force Antarctica. Then, in 1991, she joined the United States Antarctic Program contractor Antarctic Support Associates, where she worked until 1996. She was the first female U.S. Army officer to serve in Antarctica. While working on the continent, she specialized in logistics operations.

From October to December 1994, Schwall managed McMurdo Station, becoming the Antarctic base's first female manager. In that period, she joined Ann Peoples and Janet Phillips as the first all-female team leading the three U.S. Antarctic Program stations. She returned to manage the station in the over-winter period from February to August 1995, in which time she was promoted to major.

In 1999, Schwall Peak in Staten Island Heights was named in her honor.
