= Kirkwood Range =

Coastal mountain range in Antarctica

- Location within Antarctica

Highest point
- Coordinates: 76°27′S 162°0′E

Geography
- Location: Victoria Land, Antarctica

The Kirkwood Range (76°27′S 162°0′E) is a massive coastal mountain range in Antarctica, extending north–south between Fry Glacier and Mawson Glacier. A broad low-level platform on the seaward side of the range is occupied by the Oates Piedmont Glacier. It is south of the Prince Albert Mountains and northeast of the Convoy Range.

== Exploration and naming ==
The Kirkwood Range was named by the New Zealand Northern Survey Party of the Commonwealth Trans-Antarctic Expedition (1956–58) for Captain Harry Kirkwood, Royal Navy, captain of the supply ship Endeavour during this period.

== Location ==
The Kirkwood Range is just inland from the Oates Piedmont Glacier, which extends along the west coast of the Ross Sea from Mawson Glacier to the north to Fry Glacier to the south. Inland, the Convoy Range lies to the southwest, terminating in Mount Douglas at the head of the Fry Glacier. The Mawson Glacier extends to the northwest, forming near Trinity Nunatak and Jarina Nunatak. On a 1962 map, features of the range included, from north to south, Mount Gauss, Mount Chetwynd, Mount Endeavour, Mount Creak and Shoulder Mountain. More recently, the range has been divided into the Robertson Massif which contains Mount Gauss and Mount Chetwynd and lies to the north of the Pa Tio Tio Gap, and the Endeavour Massif, to the south of the gap, which includes Shoulder Mountain, Mount Belgrave and Mount Creak.

== Features ==
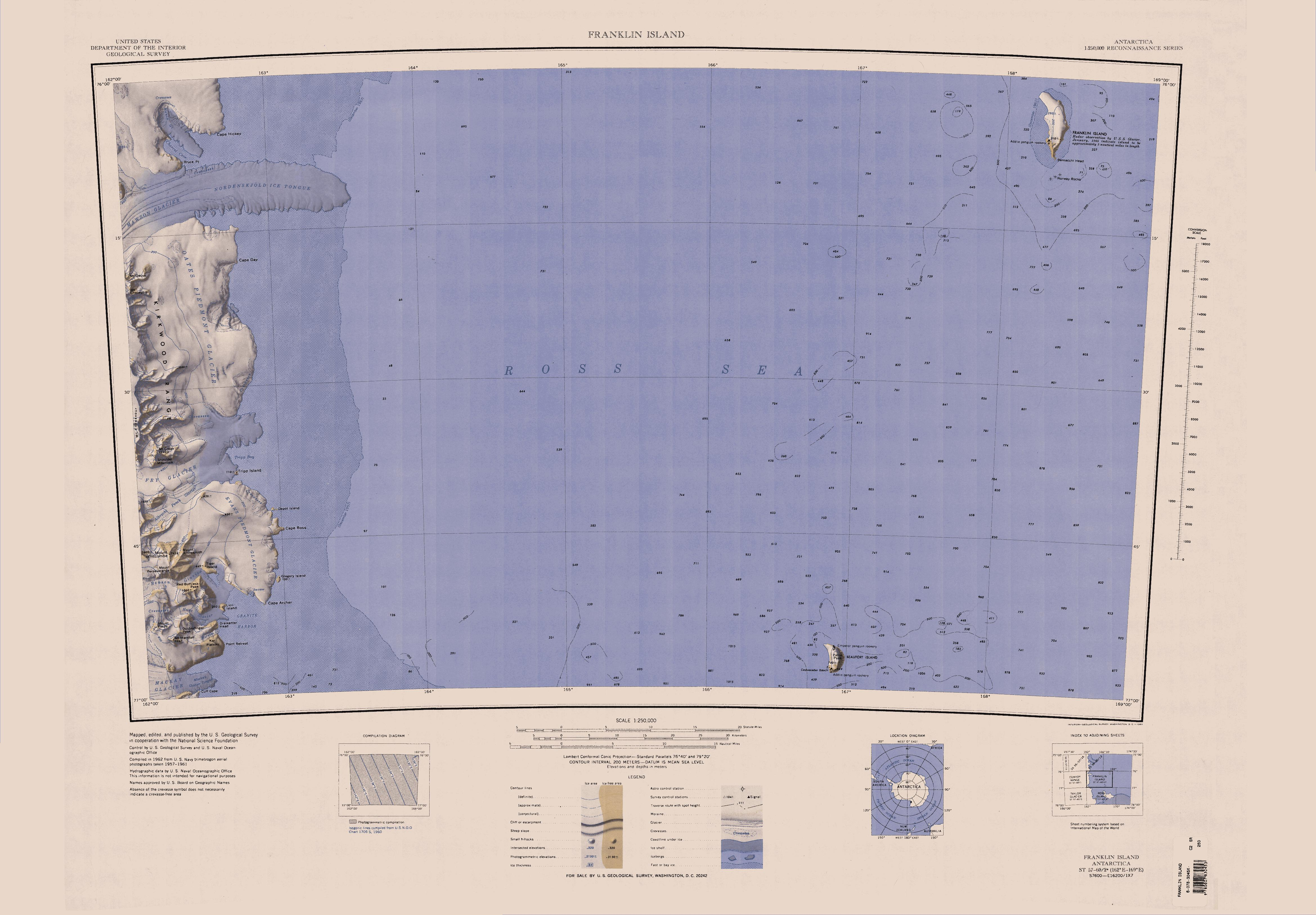
Kirkwood Range in extreme west center of map

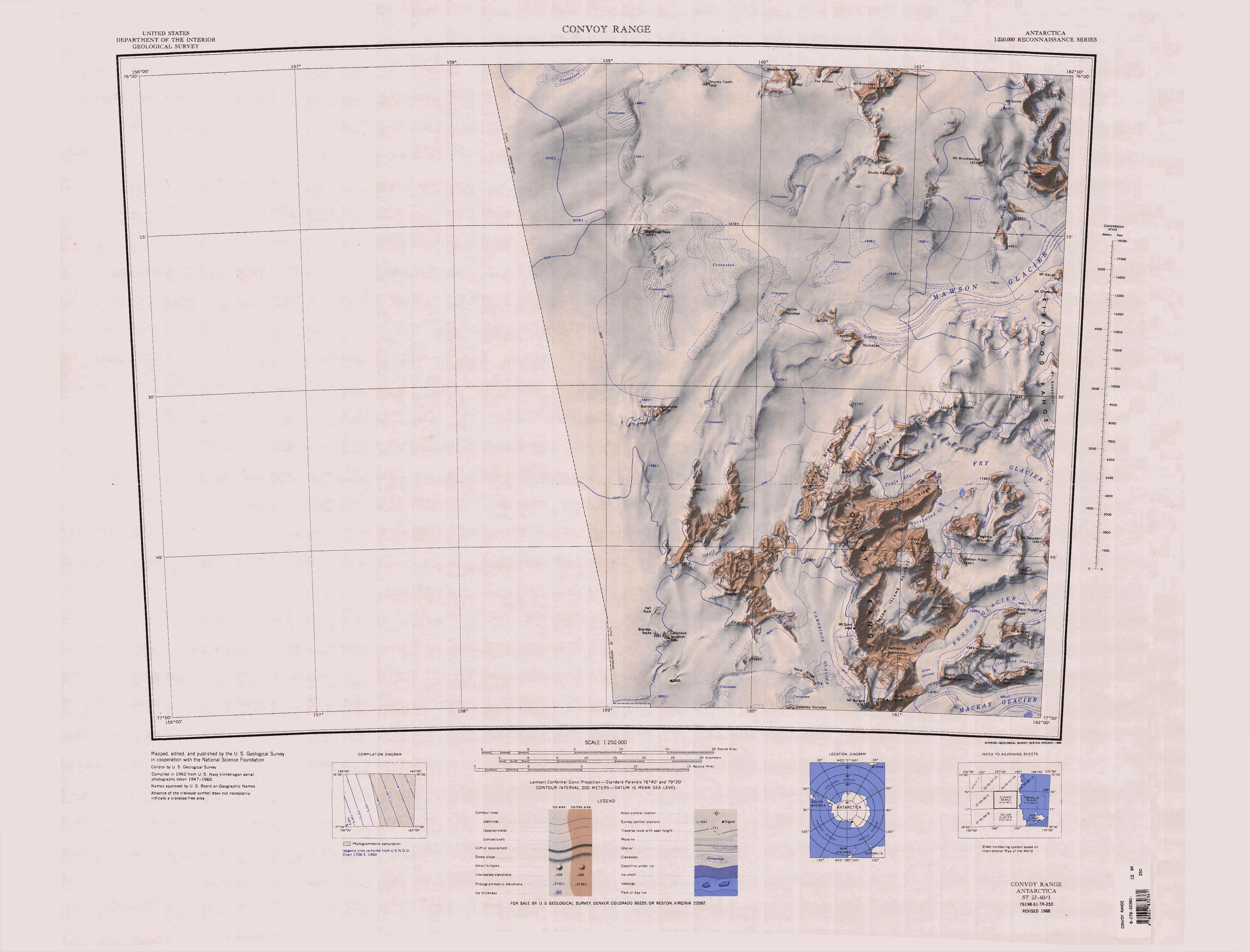
Kirkwood Range is east center of map

Named features of the range, from north to south, include:

=== Robertson Massif ===
76.3666667°S 161.9166667°E. A rugged, mainly ice-covered massif, 7 nautical miles (13 km; 8.1 mi) long, located north of Pa Tio Tio Gap. The feature includes Mount Gauss and Mount Chetwynd and forms the north segment of Kirkwood Range. Named after William Robertson, Chief Executive Officer and Surveyor-General of the Department of Survey and Land Information, 1988-96; directed programs for Antarctic surveying, mapping and place naming; currently a member of SCAR.

=== Mount Gauss ===
76°19′S 162°02′E. The northernmost peak of the Kirkwood Range. Discovered by the British National Antarctic Expedition (BrNAE) (1901-04) which named this feature after Professor Carl Friedrich Gauss (1775-1855), German mathematician and astronomer.

=== Mount Chetwynd ===
76°20′S 162°02′E. Mountain, over 1,400 metres (4,600 ft) high, immediately south of Mount Gauss. Discovered by the BrNAE (1901-04) and named for Sir Peter Chetwynd, a naval friend of Scott's, who was later Superintendent of Compasses at the Admiralty.

=== Pa Tio Tio Gap ===
76.4166667°S 161.95°E. A glacier-filled gap at 1,000 metres (3,300 ft). It trends east-west between Robertson Massif and Endeavour Massif. Pa Tio Tio is a Maori word meaning frozen over.

=== Endeavour Massif ===
A huge, flat-topped massif on the Scott Coast of Victoria Land. The massif extends south from Pa Tio Tio Gap to Fry Glacier and forms the south block of the Kirkwood Range. Shoulder Mountain, Mount Belgrave and Mount Creak rise from the south part of the massif. Steep coastal cliffs and projecting ridges mark the east margin, but there is a gentle slope west from the massif's broad, plateaulike snow summit. This feature was originally named Mount Endeavour by the New Zealand. Northern Survey Party of CTAE in Oct. 1957, but on subsequent N.Z. and U.S. maps the name was identified as an 1800 m summit 3.5 miles NW of Mount Creak. Following additional mapping by USGS in 1999 and consultation between US-ACAN and NZGB, the name of the south block of Kirkwood Range was amended to Endeavour Massif to provide terminology better suited to the complex nature of the feature. For the sake of historical continuity, the name Mount Endeavour has been retained for the summit NW of Mt Creak. Both features are named after HMNZS Endeavour (formerly John Biscoe), supply ship to the 1957 N.Z. Northern Survey Party.

=== Mount Cleary ===
76.45°S 161.9666667°E. A summit that overlooks Pa Tio Tio Gap from the south. It rises over 1,400 metres (4,600 ft) at the north extremity of the Endeavour Massif. Named after Peter Cleary, who served with the Antarctic Division and Antarctica NZ from 1978; worked with NZ and UK programs as field assistant, dog handler, and in logistics support.

=== Bulfinch Ridge ===
76.4833333°S 162.2166667°E. A ridge 4 nautical miles (7.4 km; 4.6 mi) long that extends east from the north part of the Endeavour Massif. Named by the Advisory Committee on Antarctic Names (US-ACAN) (1999) after Commander C. Bulfinch, United States Navy, captain of USS Atka in the Ross Sea during Operation Deep Freeze II and III, 1956-57 and 1957-58.

=== Mount Endeavour ===
Alberts (1995) describes Mount Endeavour (76°33′S 162°01′E) as a huge flat-topped coastal mountain, 1,810 metres (5,940 ft) high, standing north of Fry Glacier and northwest of Mount Creak and Shoulder Mountain and forming the southern block of the Kirkwood Range. Surveyed in 1957 by the New Zealand Northern Survey Party of the CTAE (1956-58) and named by them for HMNZS Endeavour, supply ship for the New Zealand party.

A more recent description from Antarctica New Zealand says it is a 1,810 metres (5,940 ft) summit, 1 mile (1.6 km) north of the base of Ketchum Ridge in the south part of Endeavour Massif. The name Mount Endeavour was given to the south block of the Kirkwood Range by the N.Z. Northern Survey Party of CTAE in Oct. 1957, but in subsequent N.Z. and U.S. maps the name was identified as the 1810m summit described above. Following additional mapping by USGS in 1999 and consultation between US-ACAN and NZGB, the name Endeavour Massif was approved for the south block of the Kirkwood Range. For the sake of historical continuity the name Mount Endeavour has been retained for the summit near Ketchum Ridge. The summit and the massif are named after HMNZS Endeavour (formerly John Biscoe), supply ship to the 1957 N.Z. Northern Survey Party.

=== Glezen Glacier ===
76.5333333°S 162.3°E. A glacier that flows east from Endeavour Massif along the north side of Ketchum Ridge to Tripp Ice Tongue. Named after Lieutenant Commander Glenn F. Glezen, U.S. Navy (USN), Administrative Officer, Task Force 43, on Operation Deep Freeze I and IV, 1955-56 and 1958-59.

=== Ketchum Ridge ===
76.55°S 162.3333333°E. The largest ridge that extends east from the south part of Endeavour Massif, Kirkwood Range. Named after Captain Gerald L. Ketchum, U.S. Navy (USN), Deputy Commander of Task Force 43 for Operation Deep Freeze I, II, and III; three seasons, 1955-56 through 1957-58, in command of ships in the Ross Sea Group.

=== Mount Belgrave ===
76.6°S 162.0166667°E. A prominent rock summit that rises over 1,200 metres (3,900 ft) about 1.5 nautical miles (2.8 km; 1.7 mi) west of Mount Creak. The feature overlooks the north side of Fry Glacier at the south extremity of Kirkwood Range. Named after Vince Belgrave, surveyor or leader in several surveys and geodetic projects for NZAP, 1984-1997.

=== Mount Creak ===
76°36′S 162°00′E. A sharp peak, 1,240 metres (4,070 ft) high, just north of Shoulder Mountain in the south end of the Kirkwood Range. Discovered by the BrNAE (1901-04) which named this peak for Captain E.W. Creak, Director of Compasses at the Admiralty.

=== Tito Peak ===
76.6°S 162.2833333°E. A prominent peak over 600 metres (2,000 ft) high, located at the end of the ridge 2 nautical miles (3.7 km; 2.3 mi) east of Mount Creak in the southeast extremity of Endeavor Massif. In association with Endeavour Massif, named after Ramon Tito, Able Seaman on HMNZS Endeavour who raised the first NZ flag over Scott Base, January 20, 1957.

=== Shoulder Mountain ===
76°37′S 162°08′E. A prominent, triangular rock buttress over 1,000 metres (3,300 ft) high, on the north side of the lower Fry Glacier and close south of Mount Creak. Mapped and given this descriptive name by the 1957 New Zealand Northern Survey Party of the CTAE, 1956-58.

== Sources ==
- Alberts, Fred G., ed. (1995), Geographic Names of the Antarctic (PDF) (2 ed.), United States Board on Geographic Names This article incorporates public domain material from websites or documents of the United States Board on Geographic Names.
- "Bulfinch Ridge", Geographic Names Information System, United States Geological Survey, United States Department of the Interior
- Convoy Range, USGS: United States Geological Survey
- Endeavour Massif, Antarctica New Zealand
- Franklin Island, USGS: United States Geological Survey
- "Glezen Glacier", Geographic Names Information System, United States Geological Survey, United States Department of the Interior
- "Ketchum Ridge", Geographic Names Information System, United States Geological Survey, United States Department of the Interior
- "Mount Belgrave", Geographic Names Information System, United States Geological Survey, United States Department of the Interior
- "Mount Cleary", Geographic Names Information System, United States Geological Survey, United States Department of the Interior
- Mount Endeavour, Antarctica New Zealand
- "Pa Tio Tio Gap", Geographic Names Information System, United States Geological Survey, United States Department of the Interior
- "Robertson Massif", Geographic Names Information System, United States Geological Survey, United States Department of the Interior
- "Tito Peak", Geographic Names Information System, United States Geological Survey, United States Department of the Interior

This article incorporates public domain material from websites or documents of the United States Geological Survey.
