= Flagship Mountain =

Mountain in antarctica

- Location within Antarctica

Highest point
- Coordinates: 76°43′S 161°30′E

Geography
- Location: Victoria Land, Antarctica

Flagship Mountain (76°43′S 161°30′E) is a prominent, conical rock peak, 1,720 metres (5,640 ft) high, surmounting the south part of the large rock mass between Northwind Glacier and Atka Glacier.

== Exploration and naming ==
Flagship Mountain was named by the New Zealand Northern Survey Party of the CTAE (1956–1958) after the USS Glacier, flagship of the American convoy into McMurdo Sound in the 1956–1957 season, and closely associated with the area in other years.

== Features ==
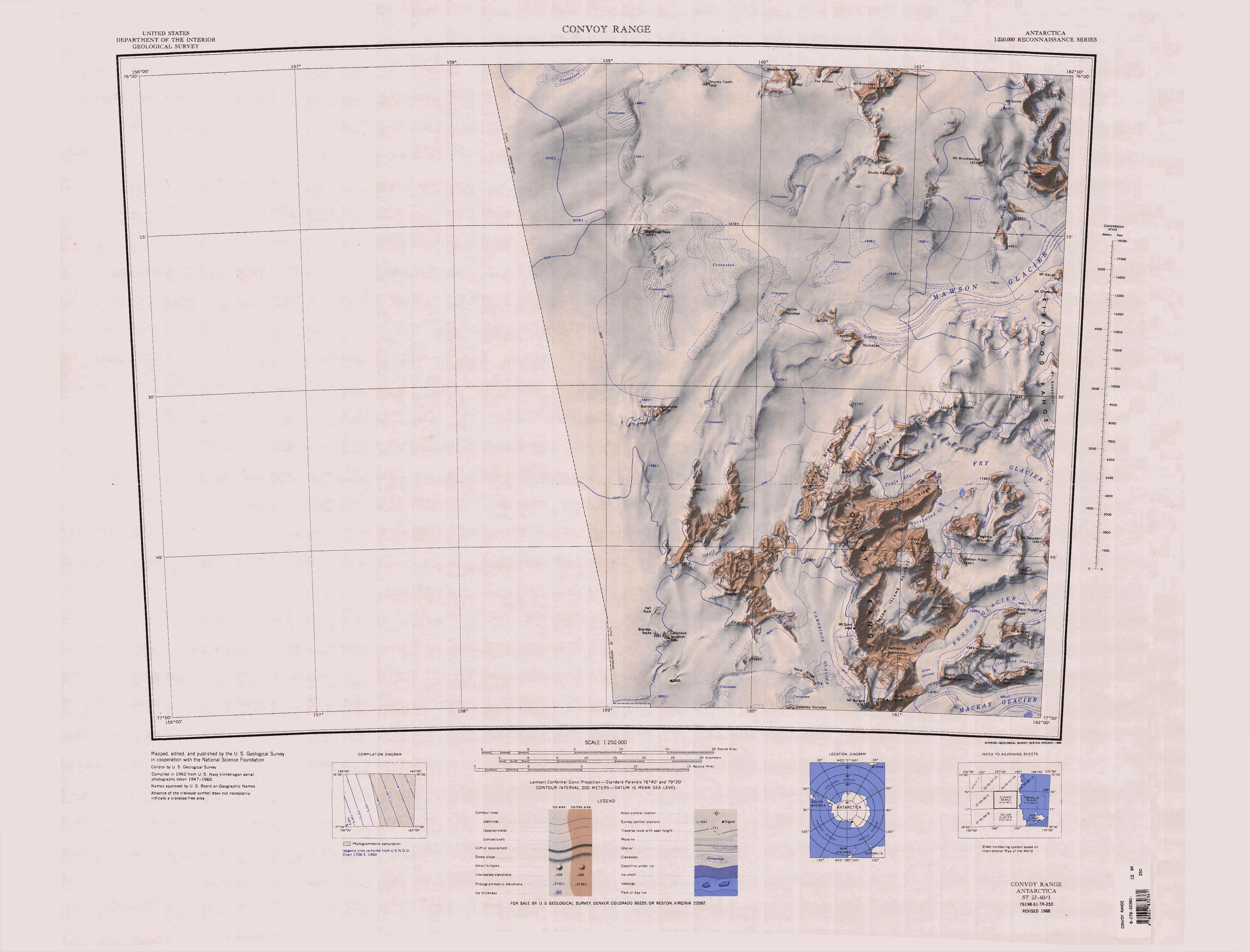
Flagship Mountain is to the northeast of the Convoy Range, in the lower part of the map

Features in the vicinity of Flagship Mountain include,

=== Barnacle Valley ===
76°47′S 161°12′E. An ice-free valley 3 nautical miles (5.6 km; 3.5 mi) west-southwest of Dotson Ridge. The name is one of a group of nautical names in the Convoy Range, this one applied by the 1989-90 NZARP field party with reference to the low and blocky floor of this valley, which has unusually large ice wedge polygon hummocks.

=== Blorenge Buttress ===
76.7166667°S 161.3333333°E A prominent, orange-colored pillar of sandstone, 2.2 nautical miles (4.1 km; 2.5 mi) west of the summit of Flagship Mountain at the west end of Viking Hills. The pillar is flanked to the west by steep blue ice and a huge windscoop from Flight Deck Neve and rises sheer from a large ice-free area to the north. The feature was geologically mapped by Victoria University's Antarctic Expeditions (VUWAE), 1976-77, led by Christopher J. Burgess who named it after a similar feature in Wales, Great Britain.

=== Taff y Bryn ===
76°43′S 161°25′E. A ridgelike summit capped by dolerite, about 1,600 metres (5,200 ft) high, situated 1 nautical mile (1.9 km; 1.2 mi) west of Flagship Mountain from which it is separated by a snow col. Named after the River Taff in Wales, the toponym in Welsh literally means "Hill of the Taff." Named by the 1976-77 VUWAE led by Christopher J. Burgess.

=== Toddy Pond ===
76°42′S 161°21′E. A pond in an enclosed basin on the rock flats 2 nautical miles (3.7 km; 2.3 mi) northwest of Flagship Mountain. The name is in the nautical beverage theme similar to Rum Pond and Tot Pond in this range. Named by a 1989-90 NZARP field party.

=== Tigerstripe Ridge ===
76°42′S 161°30′E. The north ridge of Flagship Mountain, notable for the alternating stripes of rock and snow which extend over much of its length. Descriptively named from the tigerlike stripes by a 1989-90 NZARP field party.

=== Sunker Nunataks ===
76°40′S 161°25′E. A group of small, rounded nunataks rising through the ice on the east side of Northwind Glacier, similar in appearance to a reef at sea. So named by a 1989-90 NZARP field party. In Newfoundland fisherman's parlance, a sunker is a rocky reef.

=== Matchless Mountain ===
76°38′S 161°35′E. A mountain which rises to 1,140 metres (3,740 ft) on the south margin of the Fry Glacier, at the juncture of Atka Glacier. The name was suggested by New Zealand geologist Christopher J. Burgess, leader of a 1976-77 VUWAE geological party to this locality, and refers to the matchless view of the surrounding area obtained from the summit of this mountain.

=== Glover Hills ===
76°41′S 161°40′E. The prominent hills separating Atka Glacier and Baxter Glacier. Named by the 1976-77 VUWAE, led by Christopher J. Burgess, after Dennis J.M. Glover (1912-82), New Zealand writer, publisher and poet.

=== Mars Hills ===
76°40′S 162°00′E. A small group of low rounded hills of a distinct red color, located 2.5 nautical miles (4.6 km; 2.9 mi) north of Mount Davidson. The name was proposed in 1977 by New Zealand geologist Christopher J. Burgess in association with Viking Hills and because of the color resemblance to that of the planet Mars.

=== Viking Hills ===
76°42′S 161°48′E. A range of low hills characterized by outcroppings of reddish granite in chocolate brown dolerite, situated between Flagship Mountain and Mount Davidson. The hills were visited and named by the VUWAE, 1976-77, led by Christopher J. Burgess. Named in association with Mars Hills and from their coloration, reminiscent of the color images of Mars obtained by the United States NASA planetary probes Viking I and Viking II that landed on Mars in July and September of 1976.

== Sources ==
- Alberts, Fred G., ed. (1995), Geographic Names of the Antarctic (PDF) (2 ed.), United States Board on Geographic Names This article incorporates public domain material from websites or documents of the United States Board on Geographic Names.
- "Blorenge Buttress", Geographic Names Information System, United States Geological Survey, United States Department of the Interior

This article incorporates public domain material from websites or documents of the United States Geological Survey.
