= Benson Glacier =

Glacier in Antarctica

- Location within Antarctica
- Location: Victoria Land
- Coordinates: 76°49′S 162°12′E
- Terminus: Ross Sea

Benson Glacier (76°49′S 162°12′E) is a glacier about 12 nautical miles (22 km; 14 mi) long, draining the east part of Flight Deck Névé and continuing east between Fry Glacier and Mackay Glacier into the north part of Granite Harbour where it forms a floating tongue.

== Exploration and naming ==
Benson Glacier was mapped in 1957 by the New Zealand Northern Survey Party of the Commonwealth Trans-Antarctic Expedition (1956–1958), and indicated as a somewhat longer glacier including the present Midship Glacier. It was named by the party after Noel Benson, formerly professor of geology at the University of Otago, New Zealand, whose publications include a major contribution to the petrology of Victoria Land.

== Location ==
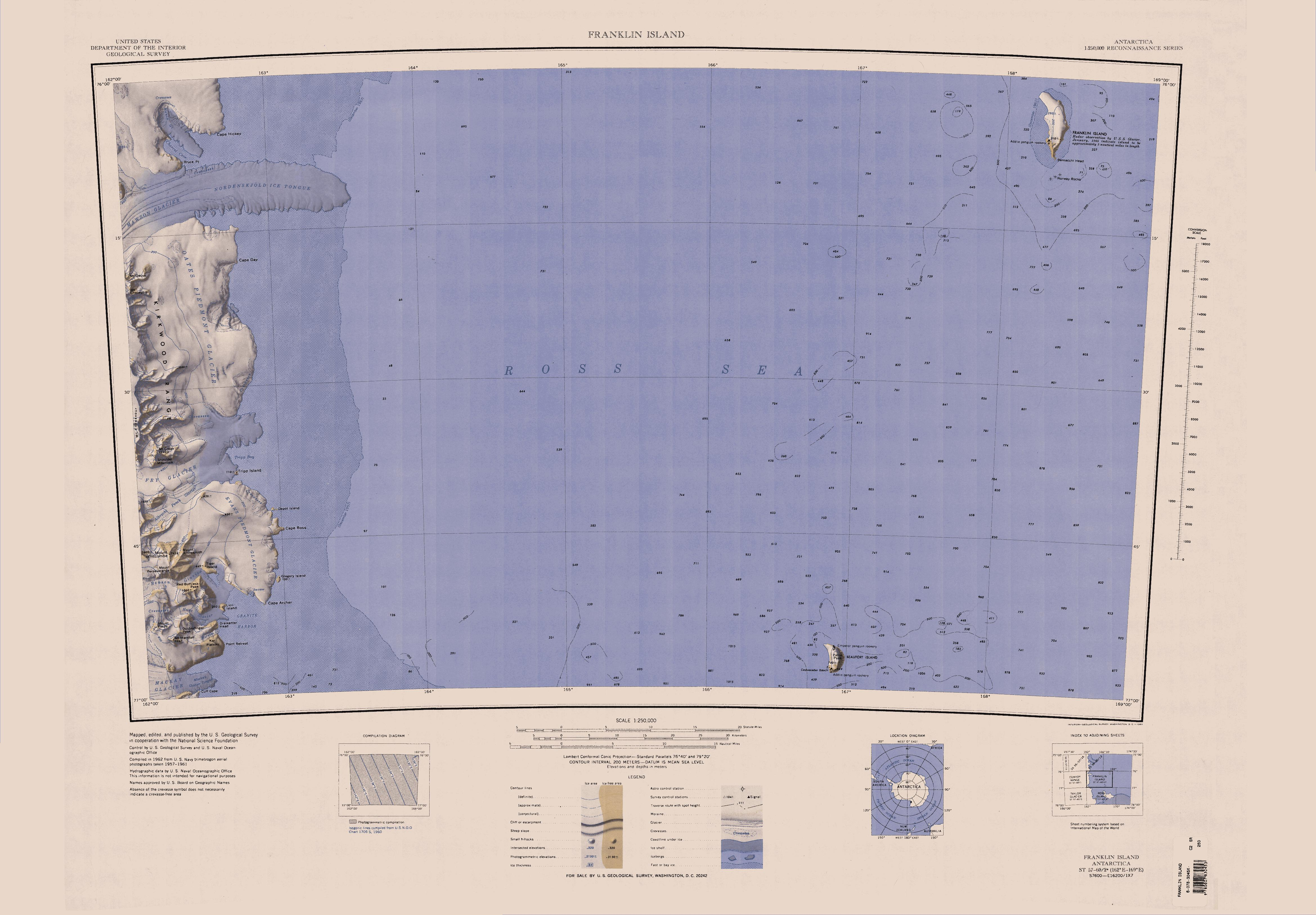
Benson Glacier towards southwest of map

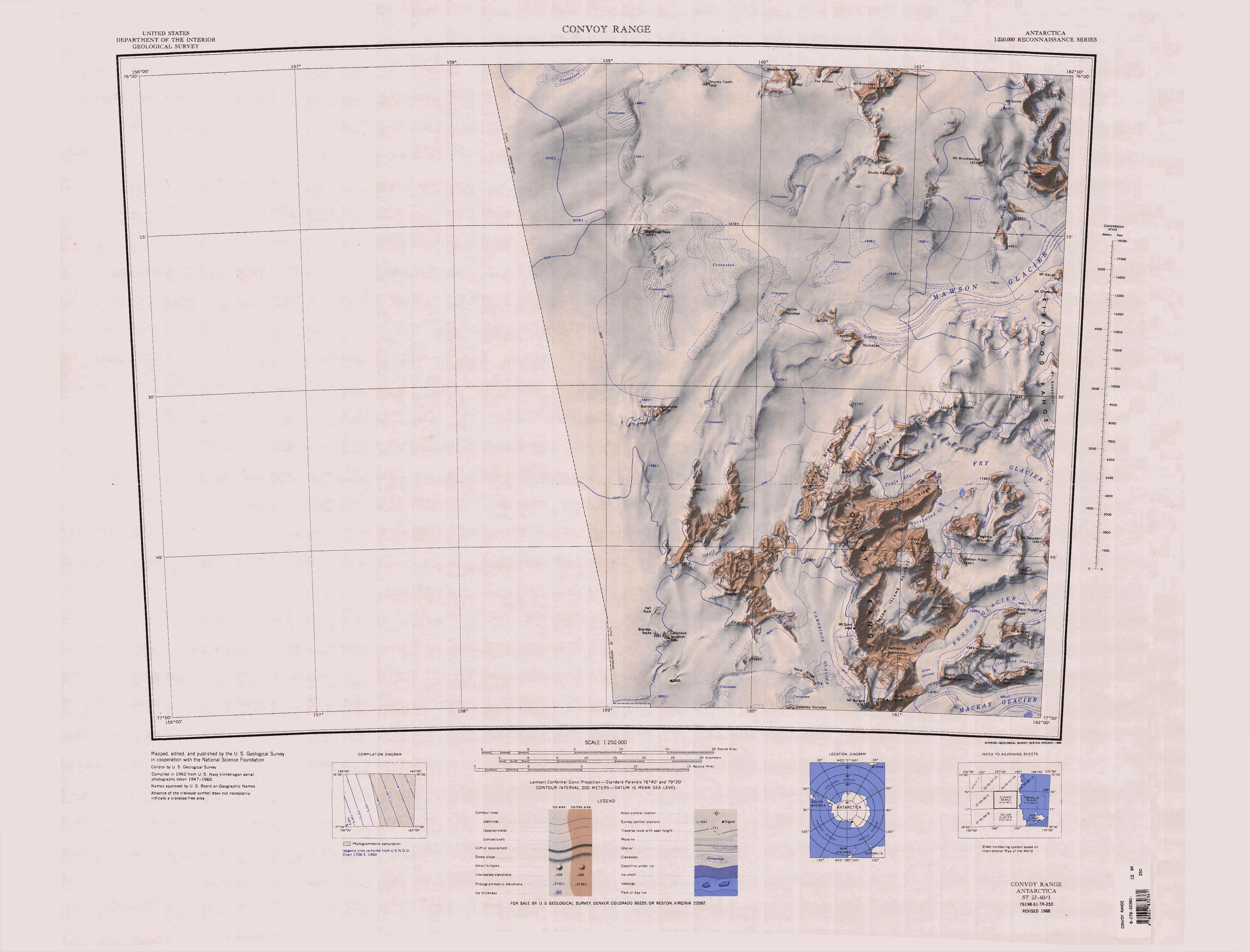
Region to the west of the glacier

The Benson Glacier forms in the northeast end of Alatna Valley in the Convoy Range and flows northeast to the south of Mount Razorback, Dotson Ridge, Flagship Mountain, Mount Davidson (Antarctica) and Mount Nesbelan, which surround Flight Deck Névé. To the south the Benson Glacier flows past Mount Morrison, Mount Brøgger and Black Pudding Peak. Benson Glacier saddles with Gran Glacier, a tributary of Mackay Glacier that flows to the south. Benson Glacier continues east past Mount Whitcombe, Mount Perseverance and Mount Arrowsmith to the north, and Red Buttress Peak to the south, to flow into Granite Harbour The small Hunt Glacier, which flows from Mount Forde joins the south of the ice tongue of Benson Glacier.

== Midship Glacier divide features ==
Features of the terrain around the contact between Midship Glacier, Benson Glacier and Cleveland Glacier include:

=== Jetsam Moraine ===
76°50′S 161°36′E. A thin, sinuous medial moraine that arcs smoothly for 6 nautical miles (11 km; 6.9 mi) from a point near Mount Razorback to beyond the far (northeast) side of Black Pudding Peak. Its curved trajectory marks the contact between Benson Glacier ice and that of Midship Glacier. So named by a 1989–1990 NZARP field party from association with Flotsam Moraines and because all supraglacial moraines are "floating" on the glacier ice, and drift similar to flotsam and jetsam.

=== Mount Morrison ===
76°54′S 161°32′E. A mountain, 1,895 metres (6,217 ft) high, standing between Midship Glacier and the head of Cleveland Glacier. Discovered by the British National Antarctic Expedition (BrNAE) (1901–1904) and named after J. D. Morrison of the Morning, a relief ship to the expedition.

=== Flotsam Moraines ===
76°51′S 161°40′E. The moraines trailing northeastward from Mount Morrison, trapped in the ice eddies between Midship Glacier and ice from local mountainside glaciers. So named by a 1989-90 NZARP field party from association with Jetsam Moraine and because all supraglacial moraines are "floating" on the glacier ice, and drift in a manner similar to marine flotsam and jetsam.

=== Dogwatch Saddle ===
76°53′S 161°41′E. A snow saddle between Mount Brøgger and Mount Morrison, separating the glacial catchments of the Benson Glacier and Cleveland Glacier. A NZARP field party made a late-night temporary camp on the saddle in January 1990. The name commemorates the midnight hours kept at this location.

=== Mount Brøgger ===
76°52′S 161°48′E. A mountain, 1,400 metres (4,600 ft) high, which forms part of the north wall of Cleveland Glacier about 4 nautical miles (7.4 km; 4.6 mi) north of Referring Peak. Charted by the British Antarctic Expedition (1910–1913) which named it for Professor Waldemar C. Brøgger, Norwegian geologist and mineralogist.

=== Shipwreck Moraine ===
76°51′S 161°47′E. An extensive moraine in a valley beside the Benson Glacier, between Black Pudding Peak and Mount Brøgger. Named by a 1989–1990 NZARP field party (Trevor Chinn) to commemorate an incident at the site. On a descent to the moraine, the motor toboggan and a sledge ran onto blue ice thinly disguised by snow and careened out of control down the slope, tossing gear and personnel overboard as the sledge overturned.

=== Black Pudding Peak ===
76°50′S 161°45′E. An isolated black mountain located 2 nautical miles (3.7 km; 2.3 mi) northwest of Mount Brøgger. Named for its squat black appearance by the 1957 New Zealand Northern Survey Party of the CTAE, 1956–1958.

== Névé features ==
Feature of the Flight Deck Névé, the main source to Benson Glacier, include:

=== Flight Deck Névé ===
76°47′S 161°30′E. An elevated and unusually flat glacier névé, about 5 nautical miles (9.3 km; 5.8 mi) by 3 nautical miles (5.6 km; 3.5 mi), between Flagship Mountain and Mount Razorback. The feature is the primary source of ice to the east-flowing Benson Glacier at Scuppers Icefalls. One of a group of nautical names in Convoy Range applied by NZGB in 1994.

=== Holystone Slope ===
76.7666667°S 161.3333333°E. A glacial slope distributary from Flight Deck Névé, 1.2 nautical miles (2.2 km; 1.4 mi) wide, that descends northwest over subdued steps between Dotson Ridge and Dory Nunatak. Named by New Zealand Geographic Board (NZGB) (1993) in association with other nautical theme place names in the Convoy Range.

=== Dory Nunatak ===
76°47′S 161°18′E. An isolated sandstone nunatak, 1.2 nautical miles (2.2 km; 1.4 mi) long, rising above the southwest part of Flight Deck Névé, 1.5 nautical miles (2.8 km; 1.7 mi) southwest of Dotson Ridge. One of a group of nautical names in Convoy Range. So named by a 1989–1990 NZARP party because the feature appears to be sailing in the midst of the glacier névé like a small boat.

=== Dotson Ridge ===
76°46′S 161°25′E. A ridgelike nunatak, 1.5 nautical miles (2.8 km; 1.7 mi) long, rising to 1,640 metres (5,380 ft) high in the northwest part of Flight Deck Névé. Mapped by the United States Geological Survey (USGS) from ground surveys and Navy air photos. Named by the United States Advisory Committee on Antarctic Names (US-ACAN) in 1964 for Morris F. Dotson, electrician at McMurdo Station, 1962.

=== Mount Davidson ===
76°43′S 161°58′E. A mountain, 1,560 metres (5,120 ft) high, standing at the head of Albrecht Penck Glacier. Discovered by the BrNAE (1901–1904) which named it for a member of the ship's company of the Morning, relief ship to the expedition.

=== Mount Nespelen ===
76°47′S 161°48′E. A massive mountain, the highest in the coastal ranges between the Mackay Glacier and Fry Glacier, lying on the north side of Benson Glacier, 4 nautical miles (7.4 km; 4.6 mi) south of Mount Davidson. Named by the New Zealand Northern Survey Party (1956–1957) of the CTAE after the USS Nespelen, one of the vessels of the American convoy to McMurdo Sound that season.

=== Scuppers Icefalls ===
76°48′S 161°36′E. A prominent line of icefalls, 5 nautical miles (9.3 km; 5.8 mi) long and nearly 400 metres (1,300 ft) high, between Mount Razorback and Mount Nespelen. The icefalls are the main outflow draining from Flight Deck Névé into Benson Glacier. One of a group of nautical names in Convoy Range, this descriptive name is derived from the drainage of the feature, suggestive of stormwater on a ship's deck draining through scuppers along the rail. Named by a NZARP field party, 1989–1990.

== Lower features ==
Features of the terrain near the coast include:

=== Mount Whitcombe ===
76°46′S 162°12′E. A large mountain, 1,425 metres (4,675 ft) high, standing just north of Mount Perseverance and west of Mount Arrowsmith at the west side of Evans Piedmont Glacier. Mapped in 1957 by the New Zealand Northern Survey Party of the CTAE, 1956–1958. Named by them for its similarity to the Canterbury, New Zealand, mountain of the same name, and in association with Mount Arrowsmith.

=== Mount Perseverance ===
76°48′S 162°12′E. The high peak near the south end of the ridge from Mount Whitcombe, overlooking the lower Benson Glacier in Victoria Land. So named because it was the final station occupied by the New Zealand Northern Survey Party of the CTAE (1956-58) during a particularly long day's field work on October 22, 1957.

=== Mount Arrowsmith ===
76°46′S 162°18′E. A jagged rock peak near Mount Perseverance, 2 nautical miles (3.7 km; 2.3 mi) along a ridge running northeast from that mountain, and a like distance east of Mount Whitcombe in Victoria Land. Mapped in 1957 by the New Zealand Northern Survey Party of the CTAE (1956–1958). Named by them for its similarity to the Canterbury, New Zealand, mountain of that name, and in association with Mount Whitcombe.

=== Mount Forde ===
76°53′S 162°05′E. A mountain over 1,200 metres (3,900 ft) high, standing at the head of Hunt Glacier, 2 nautical miles (3.7 km; 2.3 mi) northwest of Mount Marston. Mapped by the British Antarctic Expedition (1910–1913) and named for Petty Officer Robert Forde, Royal Navy, a member of the expedition's Western Geological Party.

== Sources ==
- Alberts, Fred G., ed. (1995), Geographic Names of the Antarctic (PDF) (2 ed.), United States Board on Geographic Names This article incorporates public domain material from websites or documents of the United States Board on Geographic Names.
- Convoy Range, USGS: United States Geological Survey
- Franklin Island, USGS: United States Geological Survey
- "Holystone Slope", Geographic Names Information System, United States Geological Survey, United States Department of the Interior

This article incorporates public domain material from websites or documents of the United States Geological Survey.
