= Greenville Valley =

Valley in Antarctica

- Location within Antarctica

Highest point
- Coordinates: 76°44′S 160°52′E

Geography
- Location: Victoria Land, Antarctica

Greenville Valley (76°44′S 160°52′E) is the large mainly ice-free valley lying south of Elkhorn Ridge in the Convoy Range of Victoria Land, Antarctica. A lobe of the Northwind Glacier flows a short distance west into the mouth of the valley. Near the head of the valley the south wall is breached by the entrance to Merrell Valley.

== Exploration and naming ==
Greenville Valley was explored in 1957 by the New Zealand Northern Survey Party of the Commonwealth Trans-Antarctic Expedition (CTAE), 1956–58. It was named by them after the USNS Greenville Victory, a freighter in the main American convoy into McMurdo Sound in the 1956–57 season.

== Features ==
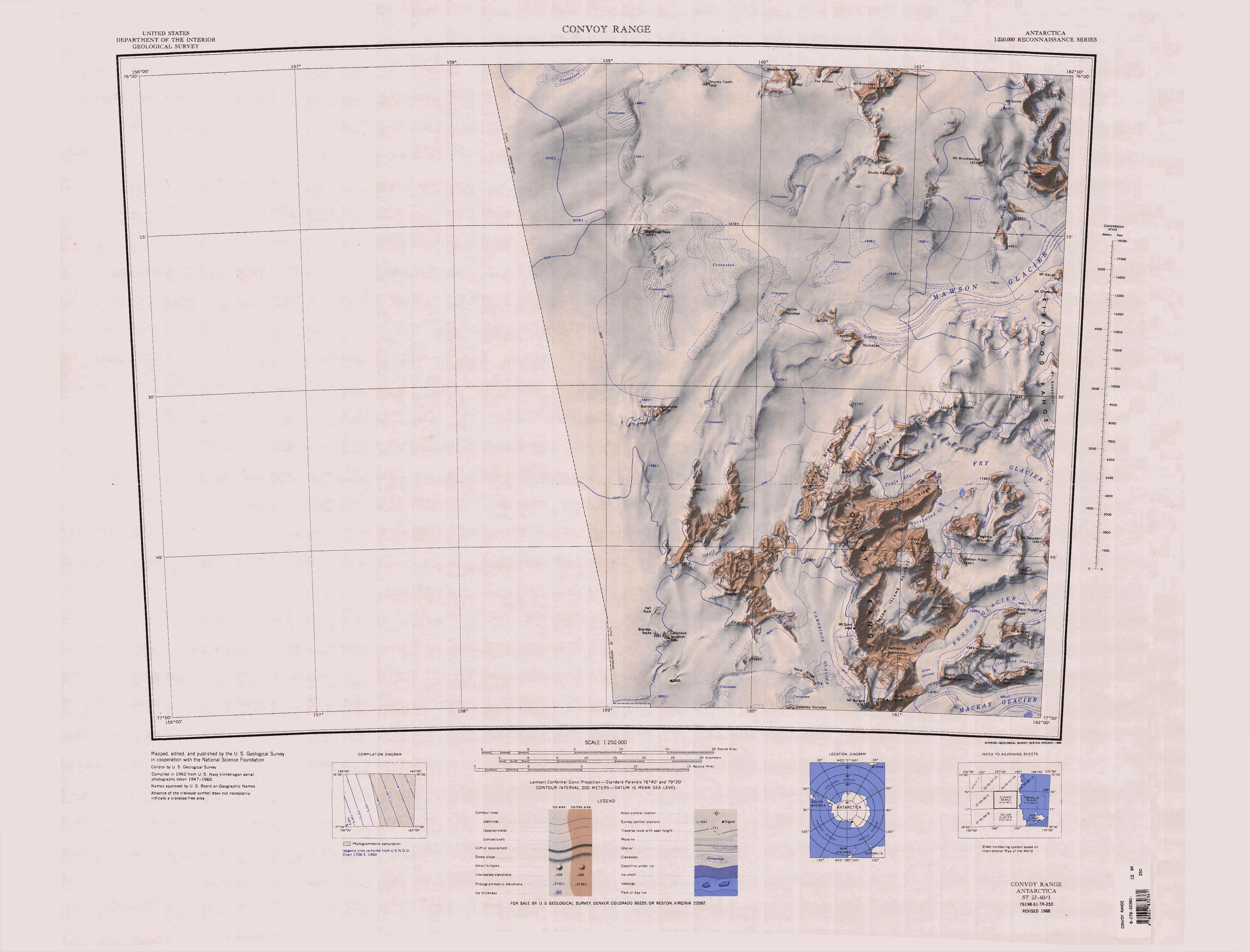
Greenville Valley is in the northwest of the Convoy Range, in the lower part of the map

=== Scuttle Valley ===
76.6333333°S 161.15°E. A small deglaciated valley with meltwater lakes which lies parallel to and just south of Towle Glacier. The valley comprises the lower elevations at the northeast end of Elkhorn Ridge and is separated from Towle Glacier by a dolerite ridge upon which the flank of Towle Glacier rests 80 metres (260 ft) above the valley floor. The feature was visited by Victoria University's Antarctic Expeditions (VUWAE), 1976-77, led by Christopher J. Burgess. The name derives from the discovery of a parachute and abandoned airdrop packaging in the vicinity.

=== Sore Thumb ===
76°40′S 161°06′E. A notable rock spire (about 1,400 metres (4,600 ft) high which rises 50 metres (160 ft) above a crest of Elkhorn Ridge, to the east of Topside Glacier. Though not the highest point on the ridge, the spire stands out "like a sore thumb" and is an excellent reference point. The approved name is a shortened form of "Sore Thumb Stack," which had been suggested by New Zealand geologist Christopher J. Burgess during a visit to the area in the 1976-77 season.

=== Elkhorn Ridge ===
76°40′S 161°03′E. A rugged ridge, 10 nautical miles (19 km; 12 mi) long, between Towle and Northwind Glaciers. Mapped by USGS from ground surveys and Navy air photos. Named by US-ACAN in 1964 for the United States NavyS ElkhoRoyal Navy, a tanker in the American convoy into McMurdo Sound, 1961-62.

=== Topside Glacier ===
76°42′S 160°57′E. A cirque glacier, 0.5 nautical miles (0.93 km; 0.58 mi) long, descending the south wall of Elkhorn Ridge in Greenville Valley. The name is a nautical approximation of the situation of the glacier. Named by a 1989-90 NZARP field party to the area.

=== Greenville Hole ===
76°43′S 160°58′E. A circular depression, 200 metres (660 ft) deep, in the center of Greenville Valley. The feature is 1 nautical mile (1.9 km; 1.2 mi) in diameter, ice free and marks the lowest elevation in Convoy Range. Named in association with Greenville Valley.

=== Bridge Riegel ===
76°43′S 161°00′E. A flat-topped rock ridge on the north side of Greenville Valley, immediately above Greenville Hole. The feature provides a platform that overlooks the entire valley, similar to the bridge of a ship. So named by a 1989-90 NZARP field party.

=== Voigt Ledge ===
76.8°S 160.8°E. A flat-topped ridge that rises to 2,000 metres (6,600 ft) high between the head of Greenville Valley and Merrell Valley. The relatively level upper surface of the ledge is 3 nautical miles (5.6 km; 3.5 mi) long by 1.5 nautical miles (2.8 km; 1.7 mi) wide, tapering in the north. It stands 500 metres (1,600 ft) high above the adjoining valleys. Named by Advisory Committee on Antarctic Names (US-ACAN) (2008) after Donald E. Voigt of the Department of Geosciences and Penn State Ice and Climate Exploration Center, Pennsylvania State University, who carried out research in glaciology, geophysics and seismology in diverse parts of Antarctica, including the Transantarctic Mountains, in 12 field seasons 1995-2008.

=== Merrell Valley ===
76°50′S 160°50′E. A long, narrow ice-free valley in the Convoy Range, running north from its head immediately east of Mount Gunn into the Greenville Valley. Mapped in 1957 by the N.Z. Northern Survey Party of the CTAE, 1956-58. Named by them after the USNS Private Joseph F. Merrell, a freighter in the main American convoy into McMurdo Sound in the 1956-57 season.

== Sources ==
- Alberts, Fred G., ed. (1995), Geographic Names of the Antarctic (PDF) (2 ed.), United States Board on Geographic Names This article incorporates public domain material from websites or documents of the United States Board on Geographic Names.
- "Scuttle Valley", Geographic Names Information System, United States Geological Survey, United States Department of the Interior
- "Voigt Ledge", Geographic Names Information System, United States Geological Survey, United States Department of the Interior

This article incorporates public domain material from websites or documents of the United States Geological Survey.
