= Eastwind Ridge =

Antarctic ice-covered ridge

- Location within Antarctica

Highest point
- Coordinates: 76°36′S 160°47′E

Geography
- Location: Victoria Land, Antarctica

Eastwind Ridge (76°36′S 160°47′E) is a broad, partially ice-covered ridge about 10 nautical miles (19 km; 12 mi) long between Chattahoochee Glacier and Towle Glacier in the Convoy Range of Antarctica.

== Exploration and naming ==
Eastwind Ridge was mapped by the United States Geological Survey (USGS) from ground surveys and Navy air photos. It was named by the United States Advisory Committee on Antarctic Names (US-ACAN) in 1964 for the USCGC Eastwind, an icebreaker in several American convoys into McMurdo Sound since the 1958–59 season.

== Features ==
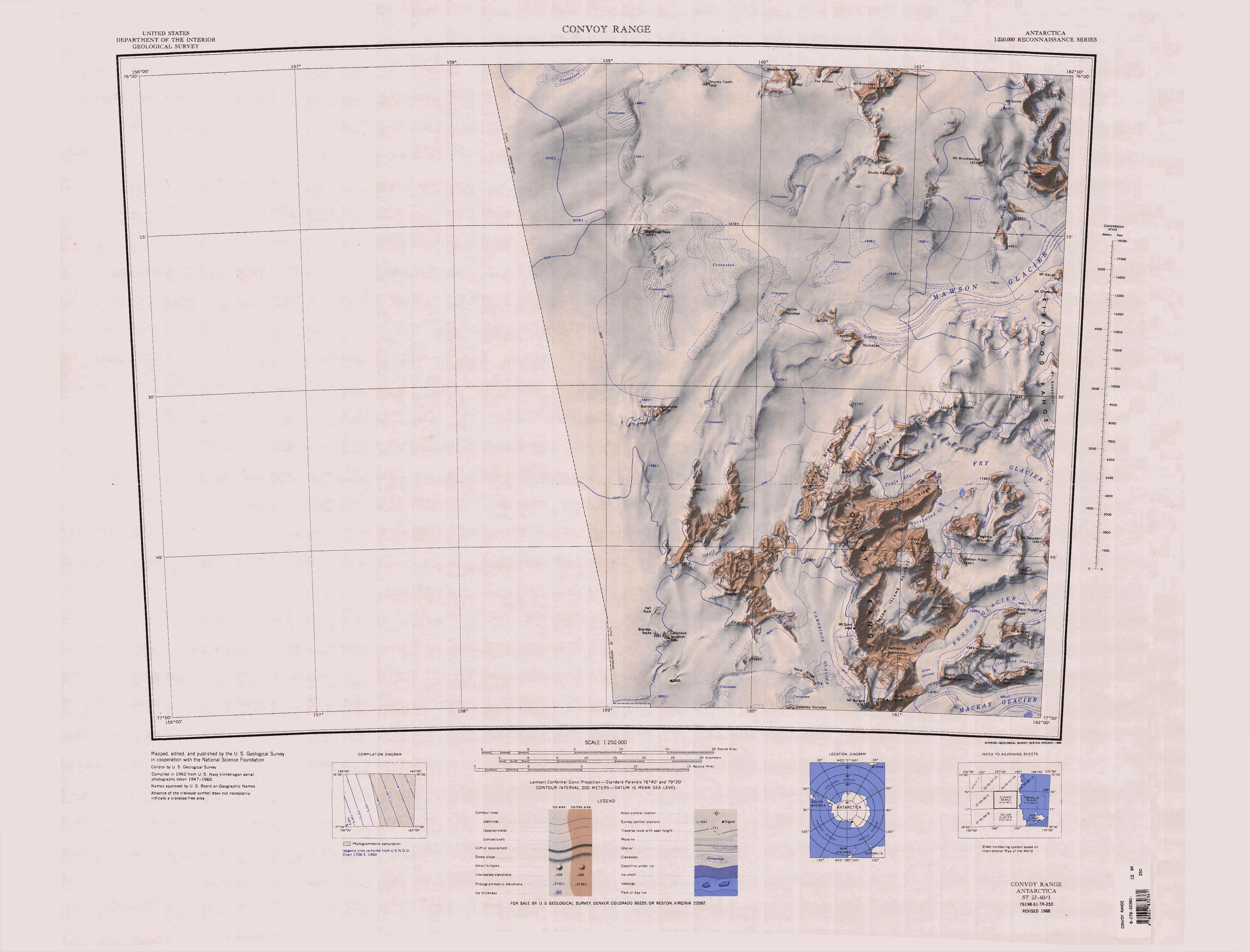
Eastwind Ridge is in the north of the Convoy Range, in the lower part of the map

=== Mount Schmidtman ===
76.5666667°S 161°E A peak to the north of Mount Naab at the northeast end of Eastwind Ridge. Named in association with Eastwind Ridge after Captain R.D. Schmidtman, United States Coast Guard (USCG), commander of the icebreaker USCGC Eastwind in the Ross Seas Ship Group in Operation Deep Freeze, 1960.

=== Drifter Cirque ===
76.5833333°S 161.0333333°E A cirque between Mount Schmidtman and Mount Naab at the northeast end of Eastwind Ridge. Iceflow from Eastwind Ridge is insufficient to carry surficial moraine away into Fry Glacier and moraines lie in a tangled eddy. So named by New Zealand Geographic Board (NZGB) which also considered the name Eddy Cirque.

=== Mount Naab ===
76°36′S 160°56′E. A mountain, 1,710 metres (5,610 ft) high, which surmounts the east part of Eastwind Ridge. Mapped by USGS from ground swveys and Navy air photos. Named by US-ACAN in 1964 for Captain Joseph Naab Jr., USCG, commanding officer of the icebreaker Eastwind during 1961 and 1962.

=== Riptide Cirque ===
76°37′S 160°51′E. A glacial cirque on the south wall of Eastwind Ridge immediately west of Mount Naab. Icefalls at the head provide the main ice flow into the Towle Glacier. One of the nautical names in Convoy Range. The name was applied by a 1989-90 NZARP field party to describe the fastest flowing tributary to Towle Glacier.

=== Slackwater Cirque ===
76°38′S 160°45′E. The westernmost cirque on Eastwind Ridge which is connected to the "dead" western terminus of Towle Glacier. So little ice from Eastwind Ridge enters the cirque that it barely makes any contribution to the west end of the Towle Glacier and arcuate supraglacial moraines remain drifting within the cirque. So named by a 1989-90 NZARP field party to describe the sluggish ice flow of this cirque.

== Nearby features ==
=== Wyandot Ridge ===
76°36′S 160°30′E. A rocky ridge at the west side of Chattahoochee Glacier. It extends northward from the northwest end of the Convoy Range. Mapped by the USGS from ground surveys and Navy air photos. Named in 1964 by US-ACAN after the USS Wyandot, a cargo vessel in the American convoy to McMurdo Sound in several years beginning with the 1955–56 season.

== Sources ==
- Alberts, Fred G., ed. (1995), Geographic Names of the Antarctic (PDF) (2 ed.), United States Board on Geographic Names This article incorporates public domain material from websites or documents of the United States Board on Geographic Names.
- "Drifter Cirque", Geographic Names Information System, United States Geological Survey, United States Department of the Interior
- "Mount Schmidtman", Geographic Names Information System, United States Geological Survey, United States Department of the Interior

This article incorporates public domain material from websites or documents of the United States Geological Survey.
