= Fry Glacier =

Glacier in Antarctica

- Location within Antarctica
- Location: Victoria Land
- Coordinates: 76°38′S 162°18′E
- Terminus: Tripp Bay, Ross Sea

Fry Glacier (76°38′S 162°18′E) is a glacier draining the slopes at the northeast corner of the Convoy Range and flowing along the south end of the Kirkwood Range into Tripp Bay, Victoria Land, Antarctica. It was first charted by the British Antarctic Expedition, 1907–09, and named for A.M. Fry, a contributor to the expedition.

== Location ==
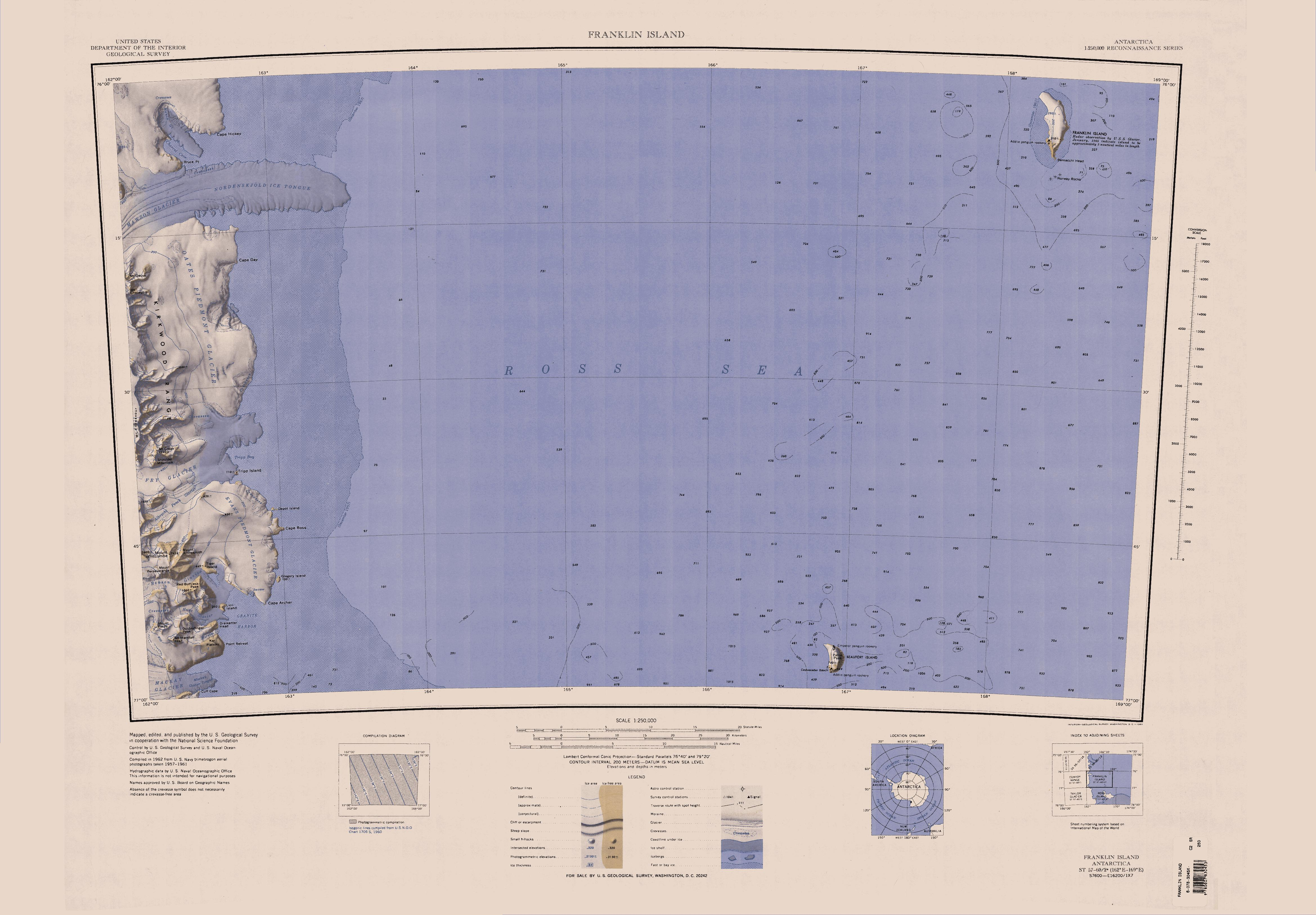
Evans Piedmont Glacier in southwest of map

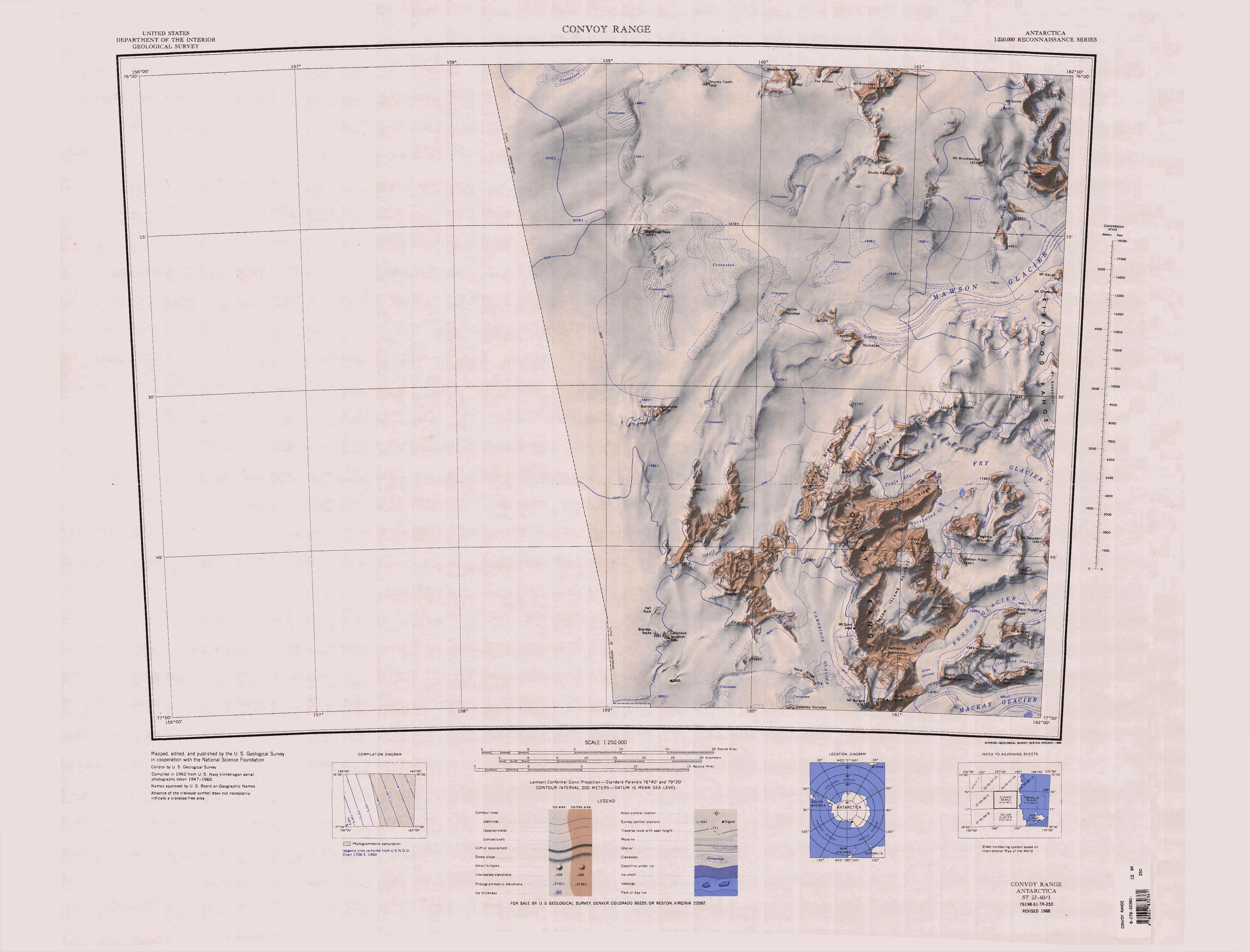
Region to the west of the glacier

Fry Glacier rises to the west of the north end of the Convoy Range, south of the Kirkwood Range. At its head Fry Saddle drops down from the mouth of the Chattahoochee Glacier, between Mount Naab and Mount Douglas. The Towle Glacier joins the Fry Glacier from the west, to the north of Elkhorn Ridge. The Northwind Glacier and Atka Glacier join the head of Fry Glacier from the south. Fry Glacier flows past Shoulder Mountain to the north to enter Tripp Bay on the Ross Sea. Albrecht Penck Glacier converges with Fry Glacier in Tripp Bay.

== Features ==
Tributaries and features of the terrain the glacier flows through include:

=== Fry Saddle ===
76°33′S 161°05′E. Narrow ice saddle at the head of Fry Glacier, about 4 nautical miles (7.4 km; 4.6 mi) west-southwest of Mount Douglas. Discovered in 1957 by the New Zealand Northern Survey Party of the Commonwealth Trans-Antarctic Expedition (CTAE) (1956-58) and named by them in association with Fry Glacier.

=== Chattahoochee Glacier ===
76°34′S 160°42′E. Glacier in the Convoy Range which flows northeast between Wyandot Ridge and Eastwind Ridge. Mapped by the United States Geological Survey (USGS) from ground surveys and Navy air photos. Named by the United States Advisory Committee on Antarctic Names (US-ACAN) in 1964 for the United States Navy Chattahoochee a tanker in the American convoy into McMurdo Sound in the 1961-62 and 1962-63 seasons.

=== Mount Douglas ===
76°31′S 161°18′E. A striking pyramidal peak, 1,750 metres (5,740 ft) high, near the head of Fry Glacier, on the divide between the Fry Glacier and Mawson Glacier. The New Zealand Northern Survey Party of the CTAE (1956-58) established a survey station on its summit in December 1957. Named for Murray H. Douglas, a member of the party.

=== Towle Glacier ===
76°38′S 161°05′E. Glacier draining northeast between Eastwind Ridge and Elkhorn Ridge into the Fry Glacier. Mapped in 1957 by the New Zealand Northern Survey Party of the CTAE (1956-58) and named for the United States NavyS Private John R. Towle, an American freighter which carried a large proportion of the New Zealand stores south in December 1956.

=== Bowsprit Moraine ===
76°37′S 161°15′E. A medial moraine, 1.5 nautical miles (2.8 km; 1.7 mi) long, off the northeast point of Elkhorn Ridge, where Towle Glacier and Northwind Glacier join Fry Glacier. One of a group of nautical names in Convoy Range; the mapped form of the moraine protrudes like a bowsprit out from the end of Elkhorn Ridge. Named by a 1989-90 New Zealand Antarctic Research Programme (NZARP) field party.

=== Northwind Glacier ===
76°40′S 161°18′E. A large glacier, one of the major sources of the Fry Glacier. The glacier drains the west part of Flight Deck Névé and flows north between Elkhorn Ridge and Sunker Nunataks to Fry Glacier. A lobe of the glacier flows west a short distance into the mouth of Greenville Valley. Named by the New Zealand Northern Survey Party (1956-57) of the CTAE after the USCGC Northwind, an icebreaker in the main American convoy into McMurdo Sound that season.

=== Tillergone Slope ===
76°44′S 161°24′E. A glacial slope, 1.2 nautical miles (2.2 km; 1.4 mi) wide, which is a distributary of Flight Deck Névé between Dotson Ridge and Flagship Mountain, in Convoy Range, Victoria Land. The name was applied by a NZARP field party to commemorate an incident when the steering gear of a motor toboggan broke during the 1989-90 season. At the time, this glacier was being used as access to a camp at FlagshipMountain, and the slope had to be negotiated twice without steerage.

=== Gentle Glacier ===
76°46′S 161°15′E. A small glacier lobe, to the east and immediately below Forecastle Summit, which drains south into deglaciated Barnacle Valley. Though a part of the Northwind Glacier-Fry Glacier system, this diminished glacier flows back into Barnacle Valley. The name was proposed by New Zealand geologist Christopher J. Burgess and describes the glacier, but also the excellent helicopter support provided to his 1976-77 field party by United States Navy helicopters, "Gentle" being their code name.

=== Atka Glacier ===
76°41′S 161°33′E. The glacier immediately east of Flagship Mountain, draining north into Fry Glacier. Discovered and named in 1957 by the New Zealand Northern Survey Party of the CTAE, 1956-58. Named after the USS Atka, an American icebreaker in the convoy to McMurdo Sound in the 1956-57 season.

=== Baxter Glacier ===
76°40′S 161°51′E. A glacier nurtured by icefalls from Flight Deck Névé, flowing northeast between Flagship Mountain and Mount Davidson to enter Fry Glacier. Named by a 1976-77 Victoria University of Wellington Antarctic Expedition (VUWAE) field party after James K. Baxter (1926-72), New Zealand poet and social critic.

== Sources ==
- Alberts, Fred G., ed. (1995), Geographic Names of the Antarctic (PDF) (2 ed.), United States Board on Geographic Names This article incorporates public domain material from websites or documents of the United States Board on Geographic Names.
- Convoy Range, USGS: United States Geological Survey
- Franklin Island, USGS: United States Geological Survey

This article incorporates public domain material from websites or documents of the United States Geological Survey.
