= Mackay Glacier =

Glacier in Antarctica

- Location within Antarctica
- Type: Continent
- Location: Victoria Land, Antarctica
- Coordinates: 76°58′S 162°0′E
- Terminus: Ross Sea
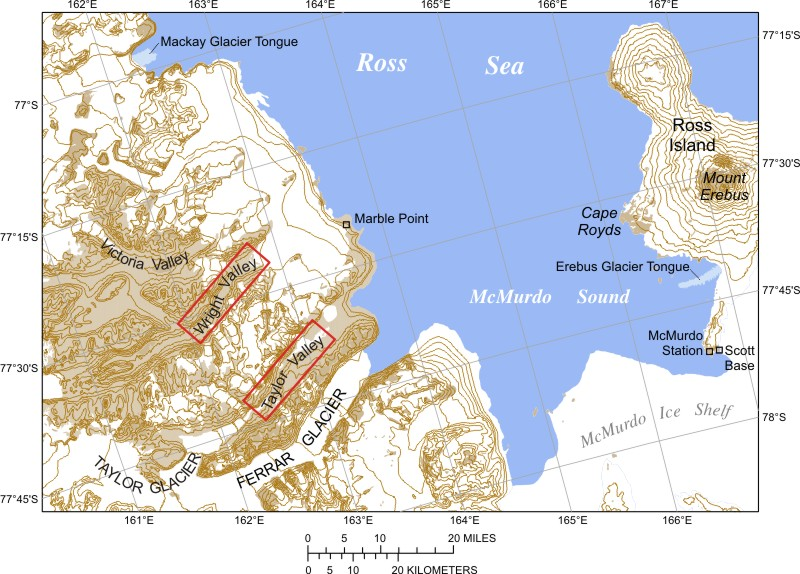
- Mackay Glacier tongue, in the north of map

Mackay Glacier (76°58′S 162°0′E) is a large glacier in Victoria Land, descending eastward from the Antarctic Plateau, between the Convoy Range and Clare Range, into the southern part of Granite Harbour. It was discovered by the South magnetic pole party of the British Antarctic Expedition, 1907–09, and named for Alistair Mackay, a member of the party. The glacier's tongue is called Mackay Glacier Tongue. Its mouth is south of the Evans Piedmont Glacier and the Mawson Glacier. It is north of the Wilson Piedmont Glacier and the Ferrar Glacier.

== Course ==
The Mackay Glacier forms on the Antarctic Plateau to the south of Gateway Nunatak and the north of Willett Range. It flows east to the north of Detour Nunatak and Pegtop Mountain, which separate it from Frazier Glacier to the south, which flows past the Clare Range further to the south. It is joined by Frazier Glacier to the east of Dome Nunatak and west of Gondola Ridge and Mount Suess. It is joined by Gran Glacier from the north between Mount Gran in the Convoy Range and Mount Woolnough. It is joined by Scrivener Glacier east of Mount Wadinough and west of Mount Allen Thomson. It flows past Redcliff Nunatak and The Flatiron to the south. It terminates in the Mackay Glacier Tongue in Granite Harbour.

== Tributary glaciers ==
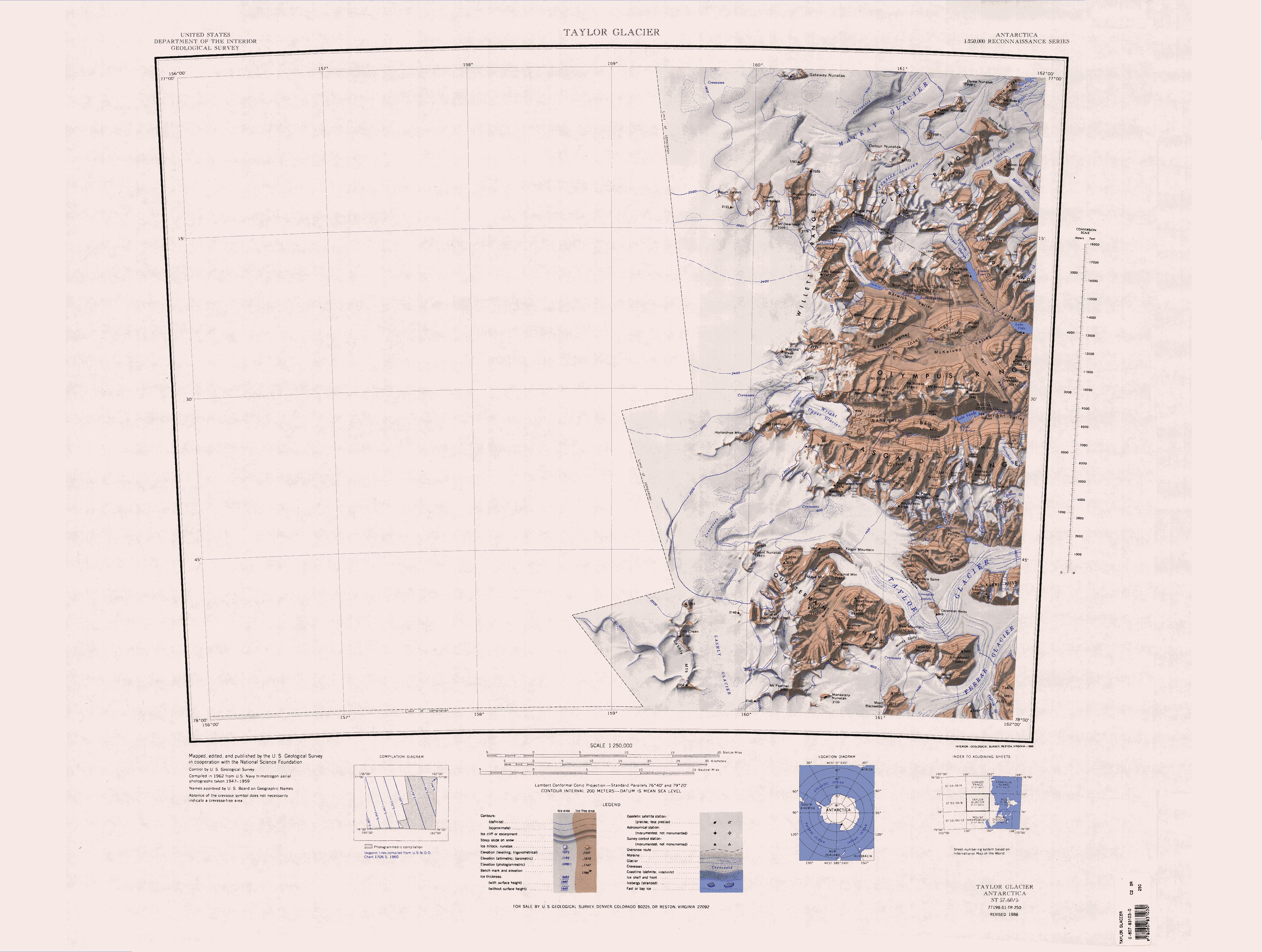
Upper Mackay Glacier in north of map

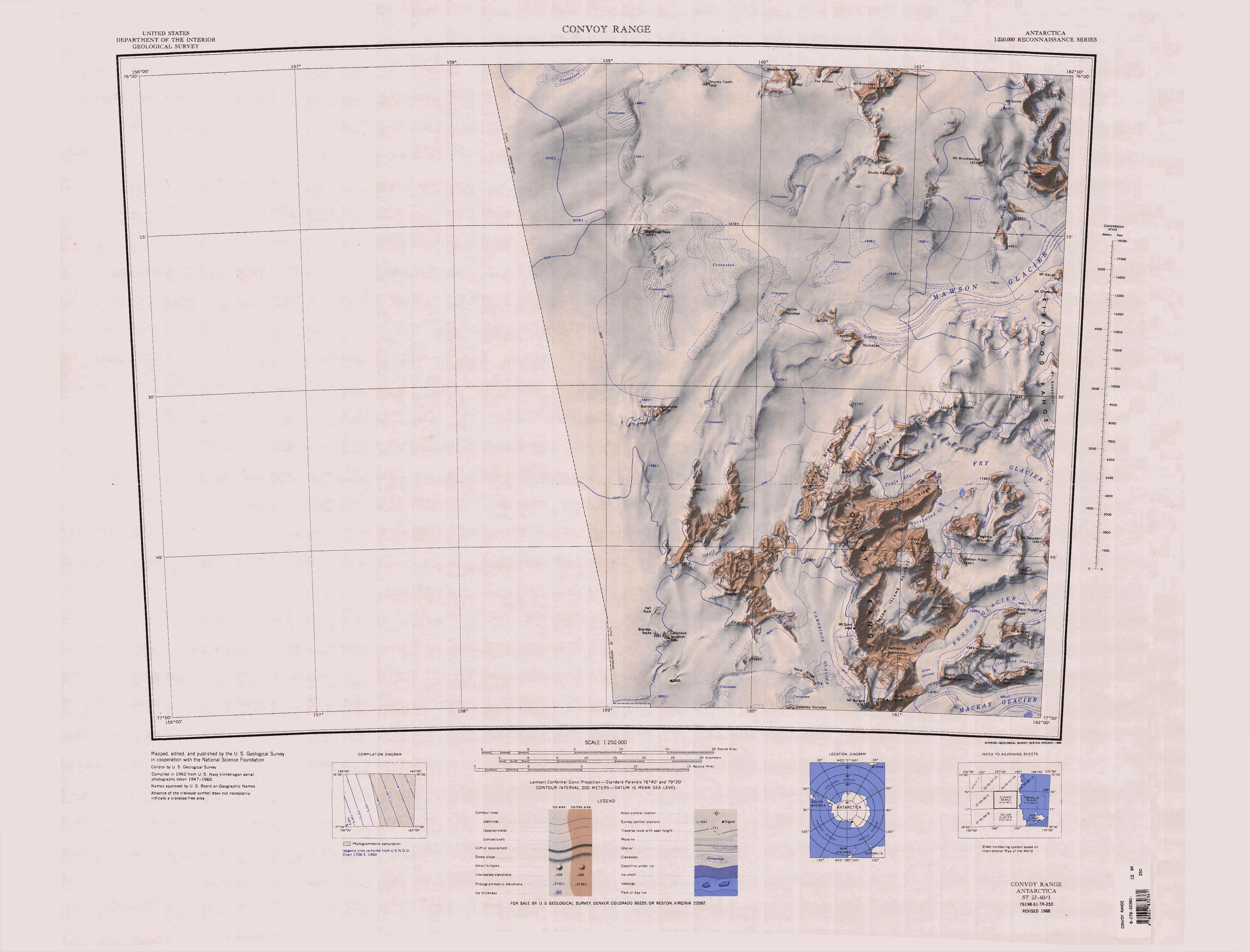
Middle Mackay Glacier in southeastcorner

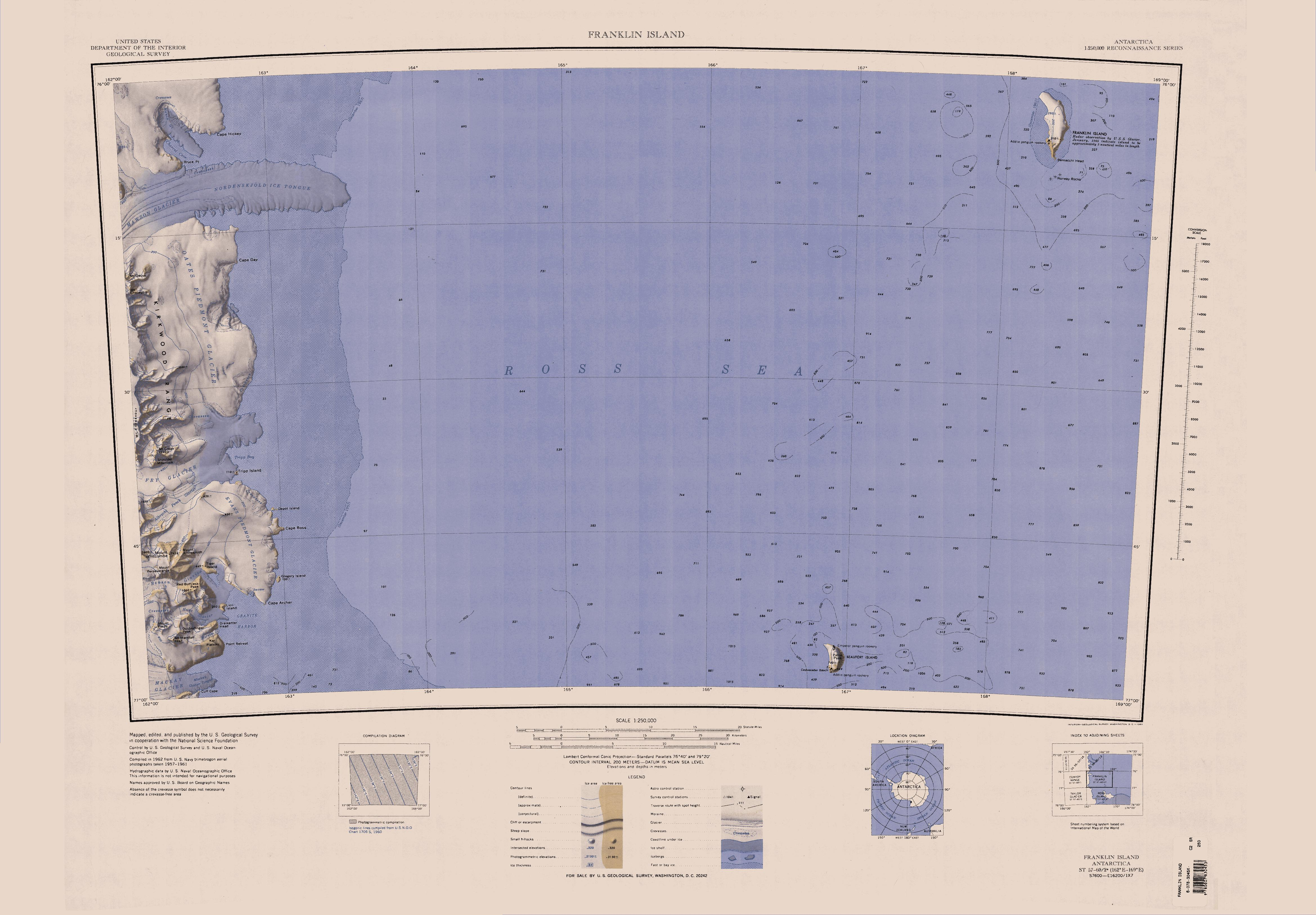
Mouth of Mackay Glacier in southwest corner

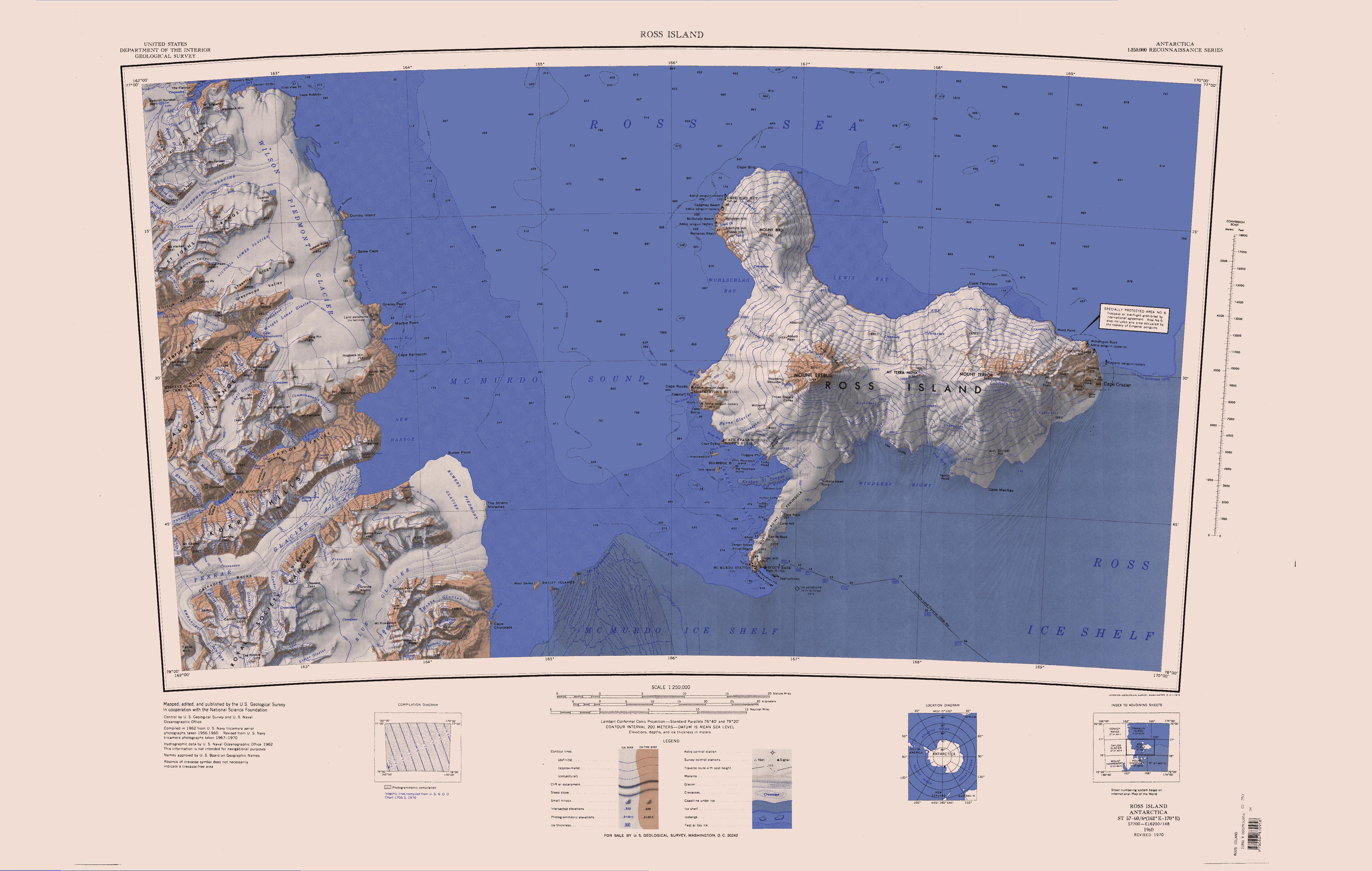
South of the mouth, in northwest corner

Glaciers that flow into the Mackay Glacier include, from west to east:

=== Frazier Glacier ===
77°05′S 161°25′E. Glacier between the Clare Range and Detour Nunatak, flowing northeast to join Mackay Glacier east of Pegtop Nunatak. Named by US-ACAN in 1964 for Lieutenant (j.g.) W.F. Frazier, officer in charge at Byrd Station, 1963.

=== Cambridge Glacier ===
76°57′S 160°31′E. A wide sheetlike glacier between the Convoy Range and Coombs Hills, draining south into the Mackay Glacier between Mount Bergen and Gateway Nunatak. Surveyed in 1957 by the New Zealand Northern Survey Party of the CTAE, 1956-58. Named by them after Cambridge University, where many of the various Antarctic scientific reports have been written.

=== Gran Glacier ===
76°56′S 161°14′E. A glacier flowing south into Mackay Glacier between Mount Gran and Mount Woolnough. It rises from a snow divide with Benson Glacier to the northeast. Named after Mount Gran by the New Zealand Northern Survey Party of the CTAE (1956-58), which visited the area in November 1957.

=== Scrivener Glacier ===
76°57′S 161°37′E. Small tributary glacier flowing southeast to the north side of Mackay Glacier, immediately west of Mount Allan Thomson. Charted and named by the BrAE, 1910-13.

=== Cleveland Glacier ===
76°55′S 162°01′E. Glacier about 2 nautical miles (3.7 km; 2.3 mi)wide which flows east-southeast from Mount Morrison and Mount Brøgger to enter Mackay Glacier just west of Mount Marston. Discovered by the BrAE (1910-13) and named by Frank Debenham, a member of the expedition, after his mother's maiden name.

== Features ==
Other features along the course of the glacier include, from west to east:

=== Carapace Nunatak ===
76°53′S 159°24′E. A prominent isolated nunatak, the most westerly near the head of Mackay Glacier, standing 8 nautical miles (15 km; 9.2 mi) southwest of Mount Brooke where it is visible for a considerable distance from many directions. So named by the New Zealand party of the CTAE (1956-58) because of the carapaces of small crustaceans found in the rocks.

=== Detour Nunatak ===
77°08′S 160°55′E. A broad nunatak between Frazier Glacier and the upper part of Mackay Glacier. So named in 1957 by the New Zealand Northern Survey Party of the CTAE (1956-58) because it was necessary to make a detour on the way up the Mackay Glacier, passing south of this nunatak.

=== Pegtop Mountain ===
77°04′S 161°15′E. An elongated mountain marked by several conspicuous knobs, the highest and westernmost rising to 1,395 metres (4,577 ft), situated at the south side of Mackay Glacier, 3 nautical miles (5.6 km; 3.5 mi) west of Sperm Bluff. Mapped and given this descriptive name by the BrAE, 1910-13.

=== Dome Nunatak ===
77°01′S 161°27′E. Dome-shaped nunatak, 990 metres (3,250 ft) high, protruding above the Mackay Glacier, about 4 nautical miles (7.4 km; 4.6 mi) northwest of Mount Suess. Charted and named by the BrAE under Scott, 1910-13.

=== Gondola Ridge ===
77°01′S 161°45′E. High rocky ridge just south of Mackay Glacier, extending northeast from Mount Suess for about 4 nautical miles (7.4 km; 4.6 mi). Charted by the Western Geological Party of the BrAE (1910-13) who so named it because Mount Suess, to which the ridge is joined, resembles a gondola in shape.

=== Mount Suess ===
77°02′S 161°42′E. A conspicuous mountain, 1,190 metres (3,900 ft) high, surmounting the south part of Gondola Ridge, near the south side of Mackay Glacier. Discovered by the BrAE (1907-09) and named for Eduard Suess, Austrian geologist and paleontologist.

=== Hopkins Nunataks ===
76.7666667°S 160.4°E. A group of three nunataks rising to 2,180 metres (7,150 ft) at the head of Cambridge Glacier, between the Coombs Hills and Convoy Range. The nunataks extend west-east 1.5 nautical miles (2.8 km; 1.7 mi) and rise about 50 metres (160 ft) above Cambridge Glacier. Named by the Advisory Committee on Antarctic Names (US-ACAN) (2007) after Steve Hopkins who worked several seasons at McMurdo Station, first as a cargo handler loading and unloading C-141 and C-130 aircraft later attaining the lead supervisory cargo position. He was injured during the 2001-02 season in a helicopter crash at Lake Fryzell while working as Lead Helo-tech for helicopter operations.

=== Reid Ridge ===
76°57′S 160°23′E. Narrow rock ridge at the west side of the mouth of Cambridge Glacier. Named by US-ACAN in 1964 for John R. Reid, Jr., glaciologist at Little America V in 1959-60.

=== Gateway Nunatak ===
77°01′S 160°15′E. Prominent nunatak near the head of Mackay Glacier, standing 9 nautical miles (17 km; 10 mi) west of Mount Gran. Surveyed in 1957 by the New Zealand Northern Survey Party of the CTAE (1956-58), and so named by them because it marks the most obvious gateway through the upper icefalls for parties traveling west up the Mackay Glacier.

=== Mount Bergen ===
76°59′S 160°48′E. Prominent rocky peak, 2,110 metres (6,920 ft) high, standing 2 nautical miles (3.7 km; 2.3 mi) west of Mount Gran on the north side of Mackay Glacier. Surveyed in 1957 by the N.Z. Northern Survey Party of the CTAE (1956-58) and named by them after the birthplace in Norway of Tryggve Gran, a member of the BrAE, 1910-13.

=== Mount Gran ===
76°59′S 160°58′E. Large flat-topped mountain, 2,235 metres (7,333 ft) high, standing at the north side of Mackay Glacier and immediately west of Gran Glacier. Discovered by the BrAE (1910-13) which named it for Tryggve Gran, Norwegian naval officer who was a ski expert with the expedition.

=== Mount Woolnough ===
76°56′S 161°19′E. Mountain over 1,400 m, standing on the north side of Mackay Glacier, about midway between Mount Morrison and Mount Gran. Charted by the BrAE, 1910-13, and named for Walter G. Woolnough, Australian geologist who assisted in writing the scientific reports of the BrAE, 1907-09.

=== Mount Allan Thomson ===
76°57′S 161°43′E. Conspicuous mountain surmounted by a dark peak over 1,400 metres (4,600 ft) high which stands at the north side of Mackay Glacier, about 3 nautical miles (5.6 km; 3.5 mi) west of the mouth of Cleveland Glacier. Charted and named by the BrAE (1910-13) for J. Allan Thomson, British geologist who assisted in writing the scientific reports of the BrAE, 1907-09.

=== Referring Peak ===
76°56′S 161°51′E. Conspicuous black peak over 1,200 metres (3,900 ft) high, standing on the north side of Mackay Glacier about 1.5 nautical miles (2.8 km; 1.7 mi) west of the mouth of Cleveland Glacier. Charted and named by the BrAE, 1910-13. The name suggests the easy identification of the peak and its use as a landmark.

=== Redcliff Nunatak ===
77°02′S 162°03′E. Red granite nunatak, 630 metres (2,070 ft) high, rising about 4 nautical miles (7.4 km; 4.6 mi) east of Mount Suess along the south flank of Mackay Glacier. Charted by the BrAE, 1910-13, and so named because of its color.

=== Lee Lake ===
77°02′S 162°08′E. A small lake at the southeast corner of Redcliff Nunatak on the south flank of Mackay Glacie. Redcliff Nunatak projects as a rounded mound of granite 300 metres (980 ft) above the glacier surface. The ice is piled up on the west side and sweeps around the north and south sides to the lee side, where it is much lower, and where this lake has formed from meltwater. Given this descriptive name by the Western Journey Party, led by Taylor, of BrAE, 1910-13.

== Sources ==
- Alberts, Fred G., ed. (1995), Geographic Names of the Antarctic (PDF) (2 ed.), United States Board on Geographic Names This article incorporates public domain material from websites or documents of the United States Board on Geographic Names.
- Convoy Range, USGS: United States Geological Survey
- Franklin Island, USGS: United States Geological Survey
- "Hopkins Nunataks", Geographic Names Information System, United States Geological Survey, United States Department of the Interior
- Taylor Glacier, USGS: United States Geological Survey
- Ross Island, USGS: United States Geological Survey

This article incorporates public domain material from websites or documents of the United States Geological Survey.
