= Evans Piedmont Glacier =

Glacier in Antarctica

- Location within Antarctica
- Location: Victoria Land
- Coordinates: 76°44′S 162°40′E
- Length: 35 nautical miles (65 km; 40 mi)
- Terminus: Ross Sea

Evans Piedmont Glacier (76°44′S 162°40′E) is a broad ice sheet occupying the low-lying coastal platform between Tripp Island and Cape Archer in Victoria Land, Antarctica.

== Exploration and naming ==
Evans Piedmont Glacier was circumnavigated in 1957 by the New Zealand Northern Survey Party of the Commonwealth Trans-Antarctic Expedition (CTAE), 1956–58, and was named after Petty Officer Edgar Evans, Royal Navy, of the British Antarctic Expedition, 1910–13, who was one of the South Pole Party under Captain Robert Falcon Scott, and who lost his life on the Beardmore Glacier on the return journey.

== Location ==
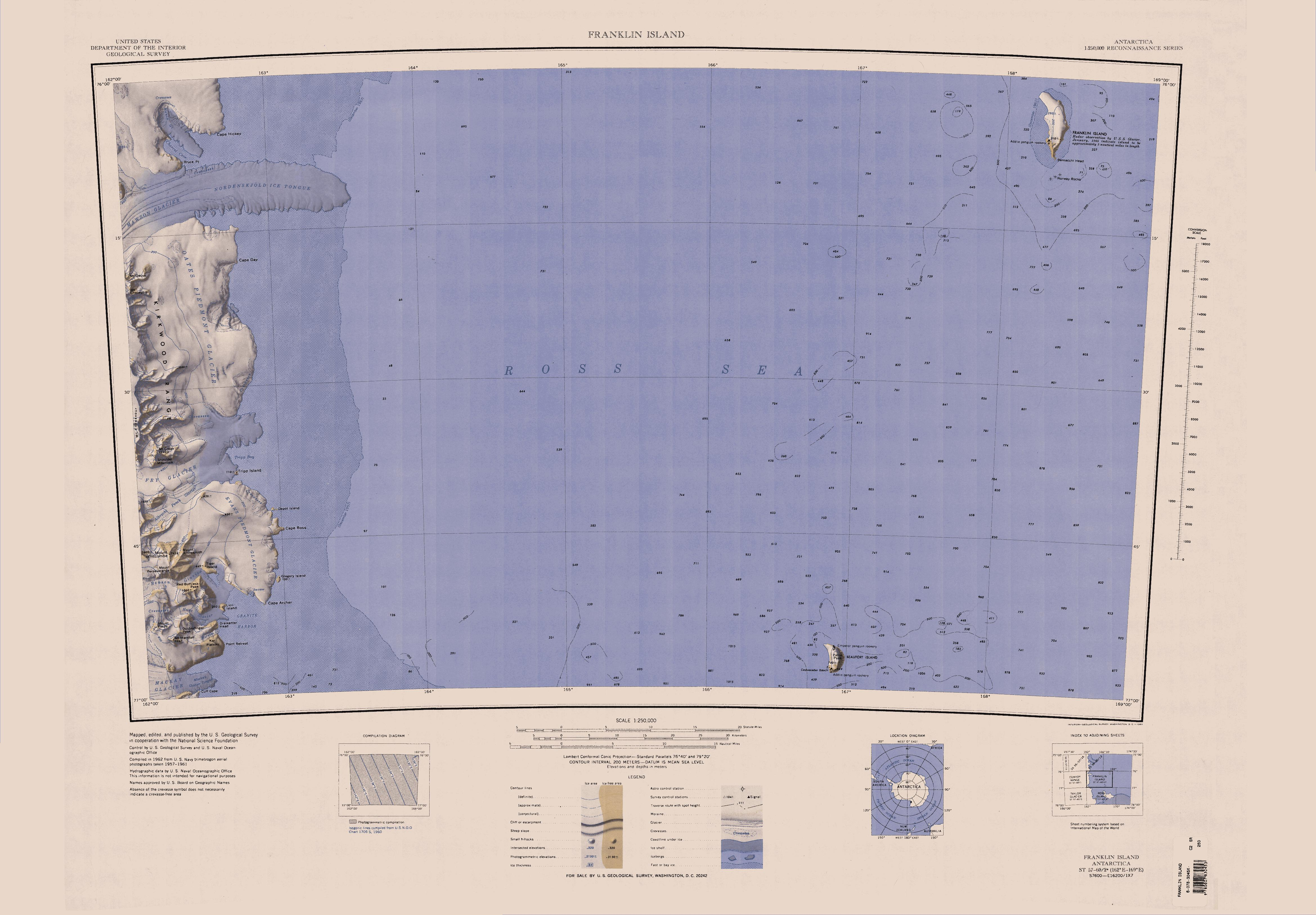
Evans Piedmont Glacier in southwest of map

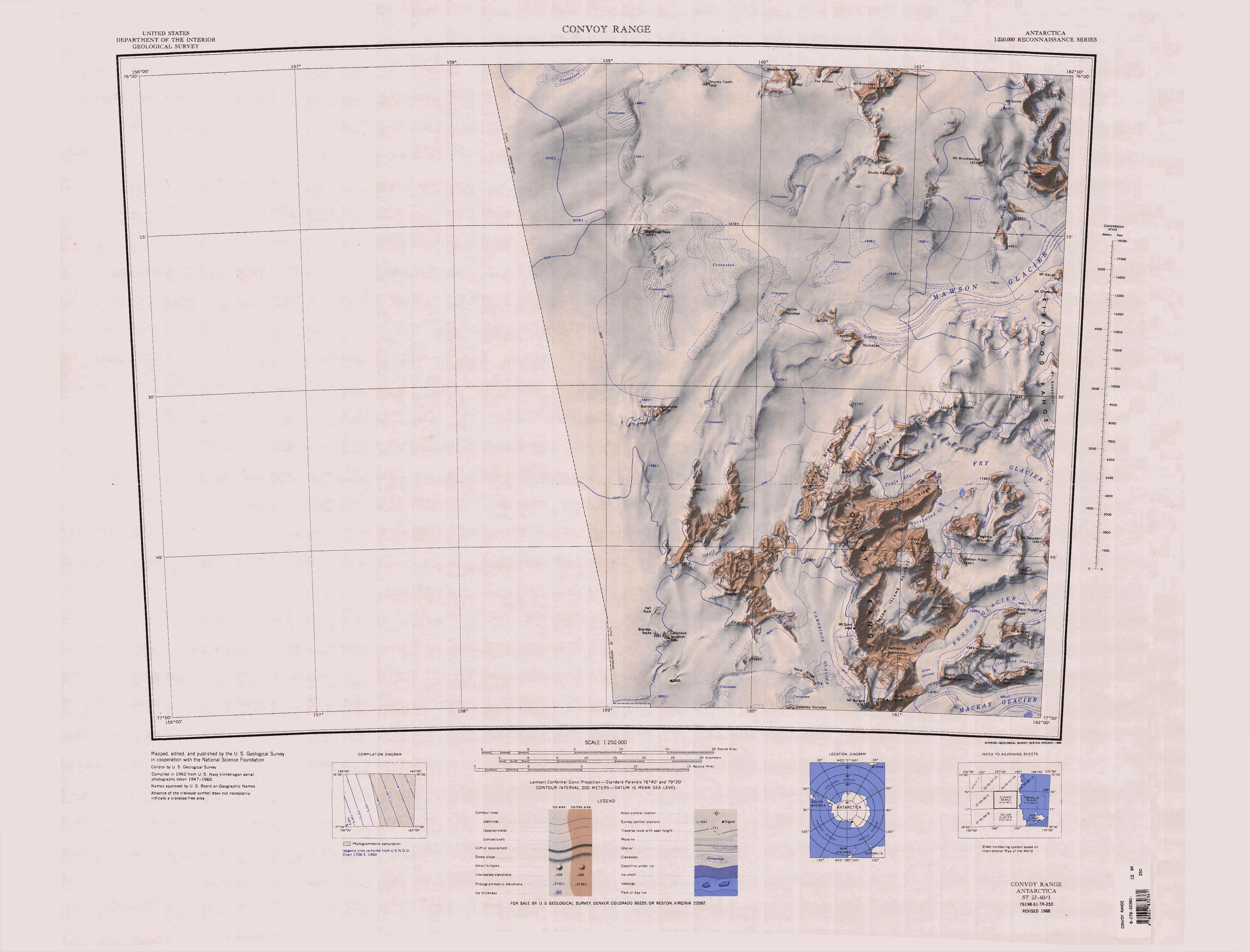
Region to the west of the glacier

The Evans Piedmont Glacier is on the west coast of the Ross Sea between Fry Glacier to the north and Granite Harbour to the south. Named coastal features include Tripp Bay, Tripp Island, Albrecht Penck Glacier, Depot Island, Cape Ross, Gregory Island and Cape Archer.

=== Tripp Bay ===
76°37′S 162°44′E. A bay along the coast of Victoria Land formed by a recession in the ice between the Gates Piedmont Glacier and Evans Piedmont Glacier. The bay was first charted by the British Antarctic Expedition, 1907–09. The name appears to have been first used by the BrAE (1910-13) and derives from Tripp Island which lies within the bay.

=== Tripp Ice Tongue ===
76.5666667°S 162.75°E. An ice tongue that occupies the north half of Tripp Bay. The feature is nurtured by several glaciers (Fry Glacier, Hedblom Glacier, as well as ice from Oates Piedmont Glacier). It could be misleading to name this tongue in association with one of these partial sources. It is therefore named for its geographic location in Tripp Bay.

=== Hedblom Glacier ===
76.5666667°S 162.4°E. A glacier between Mount Creak and Tito Peak that flows east from Endeavour Massif to Tripp Ice Tongue. Named after Captain E.E. Hedblom, U.S. Navy (USN), Medical Officer of Task Force 43 in the Ross Sea area, Operation Deep Freeze I, 1955-56.

=== Tripp Island ===
76°38′S 162°42′E. An island in the south part of Tripp Bay. Discovered by the British Antarctic Expedition, 1907–09, which named this feature for Leonard O.H. Tripp of Wellington, N.Z., a friend and supporter of Shackleton.

=== Albrecht Penck Glacier ===
76°40′S 162°20′E. A glacier between the Fry Glacier and Evans Piedmont Glacier, draining northeast toward Tripp Bay. First charted by the British Antarctic Expedition, 1907–09 which named this feature for Albrecht Penck, Director of the Institute of Oceanography and of the Geographical Institute in Berlin.

=== Depot Island ===
76°42′S 162°58′E. A small granite island lying 2 nautical miles (3.7 km; 2.3 mi) northwest of Cape Ross, off the coast of Victoria Land. Discovered by the South Magnetic Pole Party of the British Antarctic Expedition, 1907–09, and so named by them because they put a depot of rock specimens on this island.

=== Cape Ross ===
76°44′S 163°01′E. A granite headland 8 nautical miles (15 km; 9.2 mi) north of Cape Archer on the coast of Victoria Land. First charted by the British Antarctic Expedition, 1907–09 which named this feature for Sir James Clark Ross, the discoverer of the Ross Sea and Victoria Land.

=== Gregory Island ===
76°49′S 162°58′E. A small island lying just off the east coast of Victoria Land, 2.5 nautical miles (4.6 km; 2.9 mi) northeast of Cape Archer. Discovered by the British National Antarctic Expedition (1901-04), at which time it was thought to be a coastal point and was named "Gregory Point," for John W. Gregory, director of the civilian staff of the expedition. It was determined to be an island by the British Antarctic Expedition (1910-13).

== Sources ==
- Alberts, Fred G., ed. (1995), Geographic Names of the Antarctic (PDF) (2 ed.), United States Board on Geographic Names This article incorporates public domain material from websites or documents of the United States Board on Geographic Names.
- Franklin Island, USGS: United States Geological Survey
- "Hedblom Glacier", Geographic Names Information System, United States Geological Survey, United States Department of the Interior
- "Tripp Ice Tongue", Geographic Names Information System, United States Geological Survey, United States Department of the Interior

This article incorporates public domain material from websites or documents of the United States Geological Survey.
