= Bryan Glacier =

Bryan Glacier may refer to:

- Bryan Glacier, Palmer Land
- Bryan Glacier, Victoria Land
