= Labyrinth (Antarctica) =

Geographic feature in Antarctica

Wright Valley
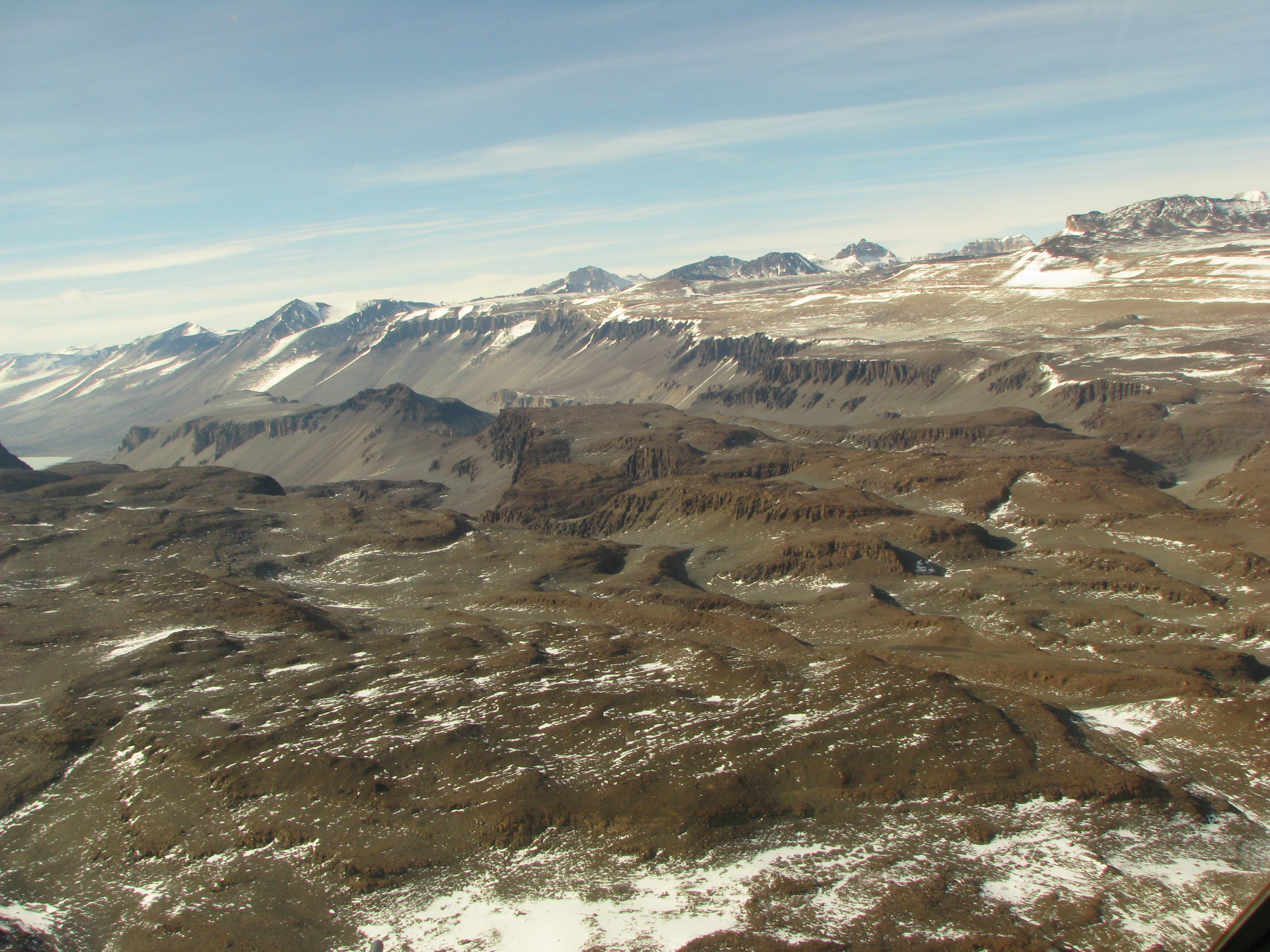
- Looking to the east from head of Labyrinth down the Wright Valley

- Location within Antarctica

Geography
- Location: Antarctica
- Coordinates: 77°33′S 160°48′E
- Interactive map of Wright Valley

The Labyrinth (77°33′S 160°48′E) is an extensive flat upland area which has been deeply eroded, at the west end of Wright Valley, in Victoria Land, Antarctica. It was so named by the Victoria University of Wellington Antarctic Expedition (VUWAE) (1958–59) because the eroded dolerite of which it is formed gives an appearance of a labyrinth.

== Location ==
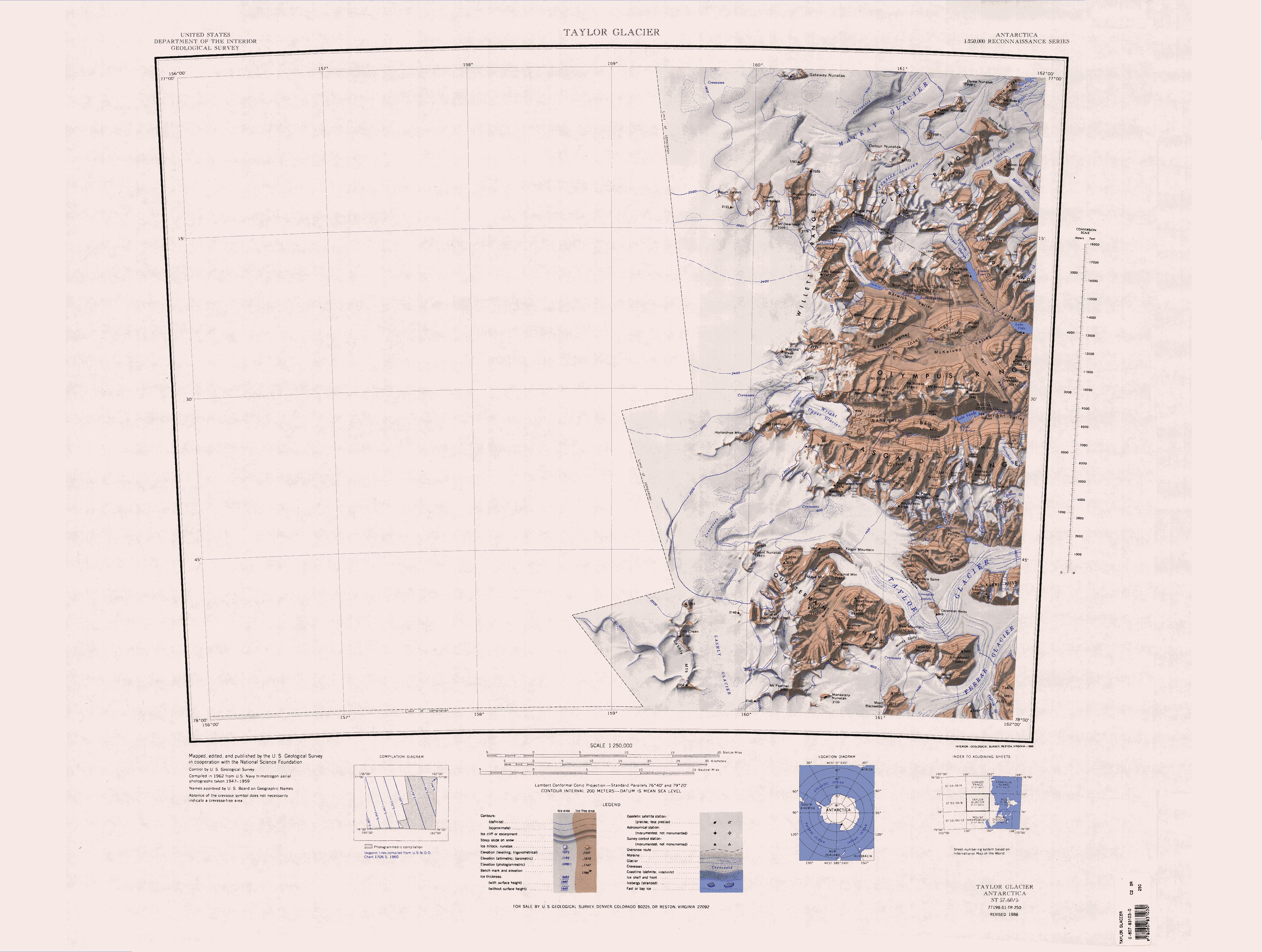
Wright Valley south of center of mapped region. Labyrinth at west end of the range.

The Labyrinth lies in the western Wright Valley. The Asgard Range, Mount Thor and Linnaeus Terrace are to the south. The Olympus Range and Mount Dido are to the north. Minotaur Pass provides a route through the Olympus Range to McKelvey Valley. The Wright Upper Glacier fills the Wright Valley to the west, and the Dais lies to the east. The Dais Col connects the east edge of the Labyrinth to the west edge of the Dais.

== Ponds ==
=== Connell Pond ===
77.554967°S 160.840913°E. A freshwater frozen pond. The pond lies in Healy Trough, 0.5 nautical miles (0.93 km; 0.58 mi) south of Rodriquez Pond. Named by Advisory Committee on Antarctic Names (US-ACAN) (2004) after Laurie Connell, University of Maine, Orono; leader of a United States Antarctic Project (USAP) field party that sampled the pond in 2003-04.

=== Headwall Pond ===
77.56777°S 160.783966°E. A very small ice-covered pond. The pond lies along a rock headwall close northeast of Craig Pond. The descriptive name was suggested by the United States Antarctic Project (USAP) field party that sampled the pond in 2003-04.

=== Craig Pond ===
77.567191°S 160.7706°E. A freshwater frozen pond 0.85 nautical miles (1.57 km; 0.98 mi) east of Dauphin Pond. Named by Advisory Committee on Antarctic Names (US-ACAN) (2004) after Scott D. Craig, United States Fish and Wildlife Service, East Orland, ME; member of a United States Antarctic Project (USAP) party that field sampled Labyrinth ponds in 2003-04.

=== Sarcophagus Pond ===
77.563132°S 160.719248°E. A small ice-covered pond 0.15 nautical miles (0.28 km; 0.17 mi) east-northeast of Dauphin Pond. A descriptive name suggested by the United States Antarctic Project (USAP) field party that sampled the pond in the 2003-04 season. A rock in the middle of the pond is shaped like a stone coffin.

=== Dauphin Pond ===
77.564858°S 160.710578°E. A freshwater frozen pond. The pond is near the southwest extremity of Healy Trough, 0.2 nautical miles (0.37 km; 0.23 mi) east of the Wright Upper Glacier terminus. Named by Advisory Committee on Antarctic Names (US-ACAN) (2004) after a USCG Dauphin helicopter (HH-65A) that landed on the pond January 20, 2004, in the course of sampling the pond.

=== Jackson Pond ===
77.547685°S 160.761095°E. A freshwater frozen pond midway between the terminus of Wright Upper Glacier and Anvil Pond. Named by Advisory Committee on Antarctic Names (US-ACAN) (2004) after J.K. Jackson, Department of Geology, Northern Illinois University, DeKalb, IL; a member of the core legging and processing team during the McMurdo Dry Valleys Drilling Project, 1974-75.

=== Anvil Pond ===
77.547879°S 160.815031°E. A freshwater frozen pond to the west of Healy Trough and 0.6 nautical miles (1.1 km; 0.69 mi) northwest of Rodriquez Pond. The name was suggested by a United States Antarctic Project (USAP) field party, 2003-04, because a rock in this small pond looks like an anvil.

=== Rodriquez Pond ===
77.55033°S 160.840045°E. A freshwater frozen pond. The pond is the larger of the two ponds that lie west of Hoffman Ledge in Healy Trough. It is just southeast of smaller Redman Pond. Named by Advisory Committee on Antarctic Names (US-ACAN) after Russell Rodriquez, United States Geological Survey, Seattle, WA; member of a United States Antarctic Project (USAP) party that sampled the pond in 2003-04.

=== Redman Pond ===
77.552629°S 160.859518°E. A frozen freshwater pond. The pond is the smaller of the two ponds west of Hoffman Ledge in Healy Trough. It is just northwest of larger Rodriquez Pond (q.v.). Named by Advisory Committee on Antarctic Names (US-ACAN) (2004) after Regina Redman, United States Geological Survey, Seattle, WA; member of a United States Antarctic Project (USAP) field party in the Labyrinth in 2003-04.

== Other features ==
=== Hoffman Ledge ===
77.554927°S 160.866693°E. An arcuate flat-topped ridge, 1.8 nautical miles (3.3 km; 2.1 mi) long and 0.5 nautical miles (0.93 km; 0.58 mi) wide, located west of Dais Col. The relatively level ledge rises to 1,000 metres (3,300 ft) and is bounded west and north by Healy Trough. Cliffs and slopes bordering the ledge rise from 50 metres (160 ft) to over 100 metres (330 ft) above the trough. Named by Advisory Committee on Antarctic Names (US-ACAN) after J.H. (Jack) Hoffman of the Geophysics Division, DSIR, superintendent of the New Zealand drilling team engaged in the McMurdo Dry Valleys Drilling Project, 1973-76.

=== Healy Trough ===
77.549939°S 160.847975°E. A primary elongate trough, extending diagonally southwest-northeast across the east part of the Labyrinth. Named by Advisory Committee on Antarctic Names (US-ACAN) (2004) after Terry R. Healy, Department of Earth Sciences, University of Waikato, Hamilton, New Zealand, who, with John Shaw, published observations on the formation of the Labyrinth following a visit in the 1975-76 season.

== Sources ==
- Alberts, Fred G., ed. (1995), Geographic Names of the Antarctic (PDF) (2 ed.), United States Board on Geographic Names This article incorporates public domain material from websites or documents of the United States Board on Geographic Names.
- "Anvil Pond", Geographic Names Information System, United States Geological Survey, United States Department of the Interior
- "Connell Pond", Geographic Names Information System, United States Geological Survey, United States Department of the Interior
- "Craig Pond", Geographic Names Information System, United States Geological Survey, United States Department of the Interior
- "Dauphin Pond", Geographic Names Information System, United States Geological Survey, United States Department of the Interior
- "Headwall Pond", Geographic Names Information System, United States Geological Survey, United States Department of the Interior
- "Healy Trough", Geographic Names Information System, United States Geological Survey, United States Department of the Interior
- "Jackson Pond", Geographic Names Information System, United States Geological Survey, United States Department of the Interior
- "Hoffman Ledge", Geographic Names Information System, United States Geological Survey, United States Department of the Interior
- "Redman Pond", Geographic Names Information System, United States Geological Survey, United States Department of the Interior
- "Rodriquez Pond", Geographic Names Information System, United States Geological Survey, United States Department of the Interior
- "Sarcophagus Pond", Geographic Names Information System, United States Geological Survey, United States Department of the Interior
- Taylor Glacier, USGS: United States Geological Survey, 1988

This article incorporates public domain material from websites or documents of the United States Geological Survey.
