= Barwick Valley =

Valley in Antarctica

- Location within Antarctica

Geography
- Location: Antarctica
- Coordinates: 77°21′S 161°10′E
- Interactive map of Barwick Valley

Barwick Valley (77°21′S 161°10′E) is an ice-free valley north of Apocalypse Peaks, extending from Webb Glacier to Victoria Valley in Victoria Land, Antarctica. A large part of the valley has been designated an Antarctic Specially Protected Area because of its pristine condition.

== Naming ==
Barwick Valley was named by the Victoria University of Wellington Antarctic Expedition (VUWAE) (1958–59) for Richard Essex Barwick (1929-2012), summer biologist with the New Zealand party of the Commonwealth Trans-Antarctic Expedition (1956–58) who worked in this area in 1957–58 and as a member of the VUWAE, 1958–59.

== Location ==
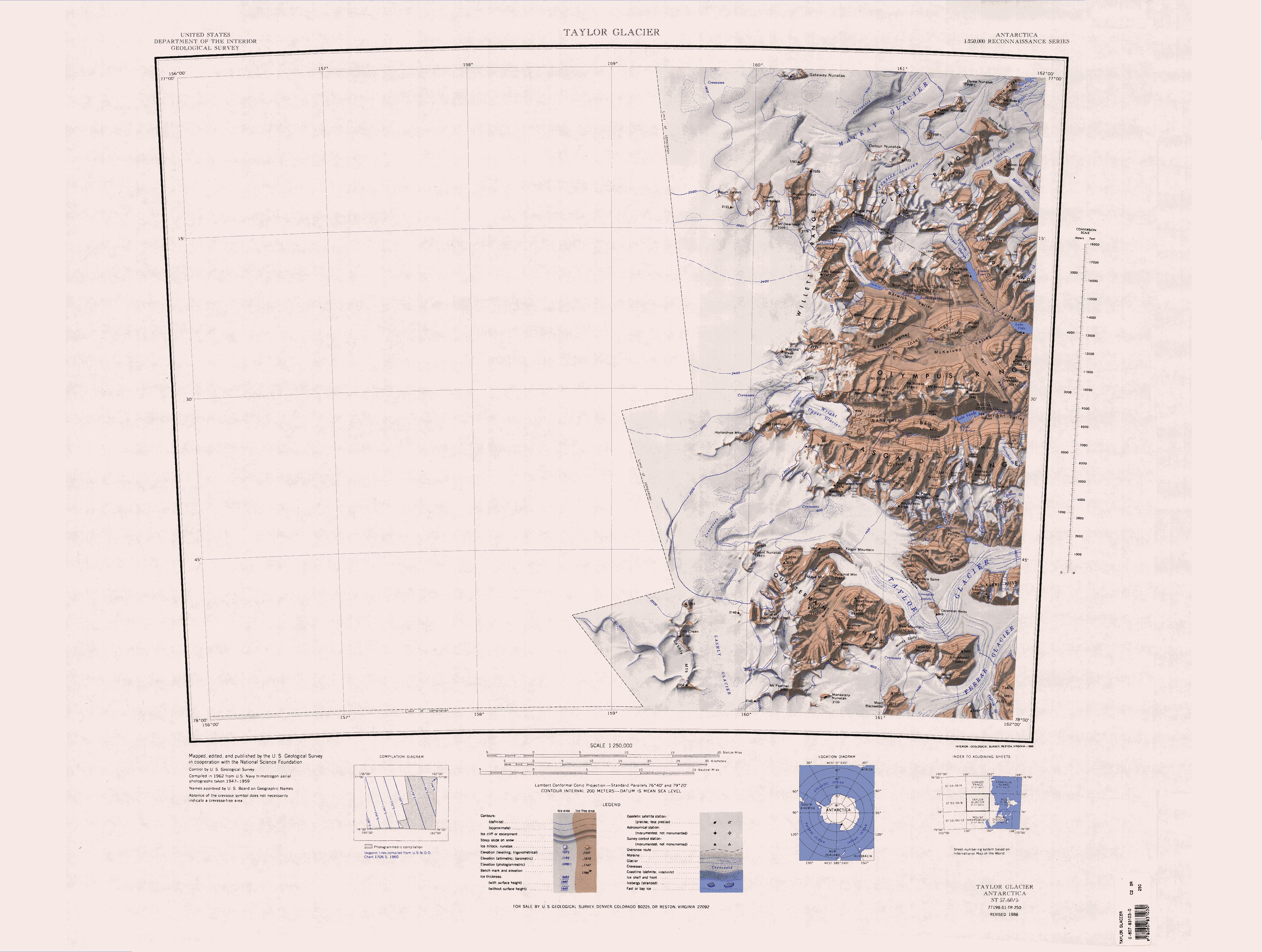
Barwick Valley towards the north of mapped region

The Barwick Valley is one of the McMurdo Dry Valleys. It runs southeast from the Webb Icefall to the Insel Range, where it is joined from the southwest by Balham Valley. The combined valley continues east to Victoria Valley. To the north the valley is bounded by The Fortress and other features of the Cruzen Range (formerly part of the Clare Range). To the west and southwest it is bounded by Mount Bastion, Gibson Spur and the Apocalypse Peaks of the Willett Range, and to the southeast by the Insel Range.

== Antarctic Specially Protected Area ==
The greater part of the Barwick Valley was designated Antarctic Site of Special Scientific Interest No.3 under the Antarctic Treaty System, covering about 325 square kilometres (125 sq mi) between the Olympus Range to the south, Willett Range to the east and Clare Range to the north. It contained parts of several glaciers, a lake about 3 by 16 kilometres (1.9 by 9.9 mi) connected by a stream to Lake Vashka, and exposed soils. This designation expired on 30 June 1981.

An area of 480 square kilometres (190 sq mi), comprising parts of both Barwick Valley and the adjacent Balham Valley, is now protected under the Antarctic Treaty System as Antarctic Specially Protected Area (ASPA) No.123 because it is one of the least disturbed or contaminated of the McMurdo Dry Valleys. It is consequently important as a reference base for measuring changes in the similar polar desert ecosystems of the other Dry Valleys where scientific investigations are conducted.

== Tributary valleys ==
A number of valleys run down into Barwick Valley from the surrounding mountains. From west to east:

=== Webb Cirque ===
77.242275°S 160.787447°E. A prominent cirque at the head of Webb Glacier. The cirque is bounded by Vishniac Peak, Skew Peak, and Parker Mesa and is occupied by the névé of the Webb Glacier. Named by Advisory Committee on Antarctic Names (US-ACAN) (2005) in association with the Webb Glacier.

=== Caffin Valley ===
77°19′S 160°36′E. A cirque-type valley between Mount Bastion and Gibson Spur in the Willett Range. Named by the NZ-APC in 1985 after James M. Caffin, New Zealand Antarctic historian who, from 1973-84, was editor of Antarctic, the popular news bulletin published by the New Zealand Antarctic Society.

=== Albert Valley ===
77.377302°S 160.92089°E. A hanging valley between Conway Peak and Wendler Spur in central Apocalypse Peaks. The valley opens north to Barwick Valley. Named by US-ACAN (2005) after Mary R. Albert, Cold Regions Research and Engineering Laboratory, Hanover, NH, who conducted field and laboratory research to characterize ice core, firn, and snow properties from Siple Dome, from the US-ITASE traverses of West Antarctica, and from East Antarctic megadunes, 1996-2003; Member, 2002- , Polar Research Board, National Academy of Sciences; Chair 2003- , United States National Committee for the International Polar Year, 2007-08.

=== Papitashvili Valley ===
77.3786°S 161.00036°E. A hanging valley between Wendler Spur and Besson Spur in Apocalypse Peaks. The valley opens north to Barwick Valley opposite Hourglass Lake and is ice free but for a glacier at the headwall. Named by the United States Advisory Committee on Antarctic Names (US-ACAN) (2005) after Vladimir O. Papitashvili, Space Physics Research Laboratory, University of Michigan, Ann Arbor, MI, member of a joint US-Russian project to collect magnetometer data in the Mirnyy to Vostok station area; four seasons, 1994-99; Program Manager for Aeronomy and Astrophysics, Office of Polar Programs, NSF, 2002- .

=== Hernandez Valley ===
77.38009°S 161.063798°E. An ice-free valley, which is the eastmost of four aligned hanging valleys in Apocalypse Peaks. The valley opens north to Barwick Valley opposite Lake Vashka. Named by US-ACAN (2005) after Gonzalo J. Hernandez, Department of Earth and Space Sciences, University of Washington, Seattle, WA; United States Antarctic Project (United States ArmyP) high-latitude atmospheric research at Amundsen-Scott South Pole and McMurdo Stations; 15 field seasons 1991-2004.

=== LaBelle Valley ===
77.330578°S 161.262567°E. A valley 1 nautical mile (1.9 km; 1.2 mi) long between Peterson Terrace and Price Terrace in Cruzen Range. The valley opens south to Barwick Valley. Named by US-ACAN (2005) after James W. LaBelle, Department of Physics and Astronomy, Dartmouth College, Hanover, NH; USAP principal investigator for the study of low-, middle-, and high-frequency auroral radio noise observed at Amundsen-Scott South Pole Station and at other observatories, 1991-2004.

=== Berkey Valley ===
77.323793°S 161.379691°E. A valley 1 nautical mile (1.9 km; 1.2 mi) long on the east side of Price Terrace in Cruzen Range. The valley opens south to Barwick Valley. Named by US-ACAN (2005) after Frank T. Berkey, Center for Atmospheric and Space Sciences, Utah State University, Logan, UT; United States Antarctic Project (USAP) principal investigator for observation of the ionosphere from Siple Station, 1982 and 1983, and from Amundsen-Scott South Pole Station, 1984-95.

== Other features ==
=== Webb Icefall ===
77°16′S 160°29′E. An icefall just south of Vishniac Peak that descends from Willett Range and nourishes the western tributary at the head of Webb Glacier. Named by American geologist Parker E. Calkin in association with Webb Glacier.

=== Webb Glacier ===
77°19′S 160°45′E. Glacier just north of Mount Bastion and Gibson Spur, flowing southeast into the head of Barwick Valley. Named by the VUWAE (1958-59) for P.N. Webb, who, with B.C. McKelvey, did the first geological exploration in this area (1957-58) and was in Wright Valley with the VUWAE in 1958-59.

=== Walker Glacier ===
77.325848°S 160.630576°E An attenuated glacier flowing northeast in Caffin Valley closely following the west side of Gibson Spur, Willett Range. The glacier terminates at Barwick Valley short of reaching the south flank of Webb Glacier. Named by the New Zealand Geographic Board (2005) after Barry Walker, a geologist with Victoria University's Antarctic Expeditions (VUWAE) to this area, 1979-80, 1981-82, and 1982-83; field leader for basement geology studies at Mount Bastion.

=== Haselton Glacier ===
77.351821°S 160.752046°E A glacier flowing east-northeast between Gibson Spur and the Apocalypse Peaks, terminating as a hanging glacier at Barwick Valley. Named by US-ACAN (2005) in association with Haselton Icefall, a heavily crevassed upper part of the glacier.

=== Haselton Icefall ===
77°21′S 160°46′E. An icefall descending from the Willett Range between Gibson Spur and Apocalypse Peaks toward Webb Lake. Named by Parker E. Calkin for fellow United States ArmyRP geologist George M. Haselton, who assisted Calkin in the field in this area in the 1961-62 season.

=== Webb Lake ===
77°20′S 160°52′E. A meltwater lake at the terminus of Webb Glacier. Named in 1964 by American geologist Parker E. Calkin in association with Webb Glacier.

=== Hourglass Lake ===
77°21′S 161°04′E. Small meltwater lake midway between Webb Lake and Lake Vashka. The descriptive name was given in 1964 by American geologist Parker E. Calkin and alludes to the outline of the lake.

=== Lake Vashka ===
77°21′S 161°11′E. A lake near the center of Barwick Valley, about 4 nautical miles (7.4 km; 4.6 mi) east of Webb Glacier. Named by the VUWAE (1958-59) after Vashka (Vaska), a sled dog of the BrAE, 1910-13.

== Sources ==
- "Albert Valley", Geographic Names Information System, United States Geological Survey, United States Department of the Interior
- Alberts, Fred G., ed. (1995), Geographic Names of the Antarctic (PDF) (2 ed.), United States Board on Geographic Names This article incorporates public domain material from websites or documents of the United States Board on Geographic Names.
- Antarctic Treaty Handbook: Antarctic Sites of Special Scientific Interest 1 to 16 (PDF)
- "Barwick and Balham Valleys, Southern Victoria Land" (PDF), Management Plan for Antarctic Specially Protected Area No. 123: Measure 6, Antarctic Treaty Secretariat, 2008
- "Berkey Valley", Geographic Names Information System, United States Geological Survey, United States Department of the Interior
- "Haselton Glacier", Geographic Names Information System, United States Geological Survey, United States Department of the Interior
- "Hernandez Valley", Geographic Names Information System, United States Geological Survey, United States Department of the Interior
- "LaBelle Valley", Geographic Names Information System, United States Geological Survey, United States Department of the Interior
- "Papitashvili Valley", Geographic Names Information System, United States Geological Survey, United States Department of the Interior
- Taylor Glacier, USGS: United States Geological Survey
- "Walker Glacier", Geographic Names Information System, United States Geological Survey, United States Department of the Interior
- "Webb Cirque", Geographic Names Information System, United States Geological Survey, United States Department of the Interior

This article incorporates public domain material from websites or documents of the United States Geological Survey.
