= Diana Wall =

American biologist (1943–2024)

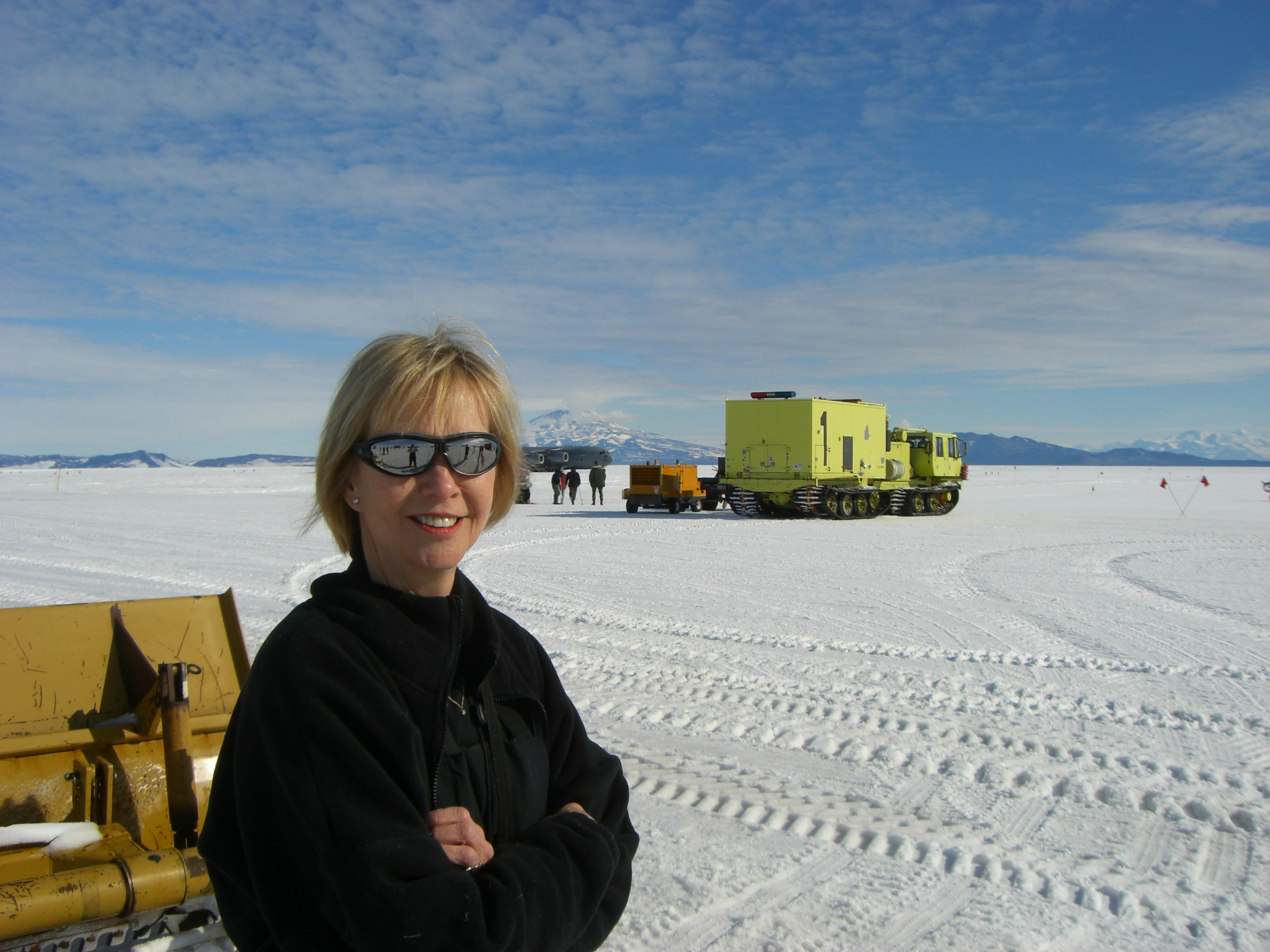
- Born: Diana Harrison Wall; December 27, 1943; Durham, North Carolina, U.S.
- Died: March 25, 2024 (aged 80)
- Education: University of Kentucky
- Awards: SCAR medal (2012); Tyler Prize (2013)
- Scientific career
- Fields: Soil ecology Environmental science
- Workplaces: Colorado State University
- Website: walllab.colostate.edu/

Diana Harrison Wall (December 27, 1943 – March 25, 2024) was an American environmental scientist and soil ecologist. She was the founding director of the School of Global Environmental Sustainability, a distinguished biology professor, and senior research scientist at the Natural Resource Ecology Laboratory at Colorado State University. Wall investigated ecosystem processes, soil biodiversity and ecosystem services. Her research focused on the Antarctic McMurdo Dry Valleys and its Wall Valley was named after her. Wall was a globally recognized leader and speaker on life in Antarctica and climate change.

== Early life and education ==
Diana Wall was born on December 27, 1943, in Durham, North Carolina. Her formative years were spent in Lexington, Kentucky, where she graduated from Lafayette High School. She earned a Bachelor of Arts in biology from the University of Kentucky in 1965. Her interest in nematodes began during her undergraduate studies when she worked on nematode parasites in horses and birds. She completed her PhD in plant pathology from the University of Kentucky in 1971.

== Career and impact ==
Wall began work as a postdoctoral researcher at University of California-Riverside in 1972 where she researched the function and biological diversity of soil ecosystems. In 1976 she began work in the Department of Nematology as an Assistant Research Nematologist. She continued to work at UC Riverside for a further seventeen years before becoming a Professor in the Department of Nematology. Throughout this period, she was the Associate Director of the Drylands Research Institute from 1986 to 1988 and the Associate Program Director of the National Science Foundation in Washington, DC, from 1988 to 1989.

Wall began working at Colorado State University in 1993. At this time, she became a Professor in the Department of Forest, Rangeland, and Watershed Stewardship (until 2006), the Associate Dean for Research in the Natural Resources College (until 2000) and the Director of the Natural Resource Ecology Laboratory (until 2005). Wall became a Professor in the Department of Biology at CSU in 2006 and was key in establishing the School of Global Environmental Sustainability at CSU in 2008.

Wall began working in Antarctica's Dry Valleys in 1989. She conducted long-term soil ecology research in the region, drawing links between soil process and diversity to environmental conditions. Wall played a key role in pioneering the study and measurement of anhydrobiosis, which is how nematodes cope physiologically with dry and hot temperatures. Specifically, she found that Scottnema lindsayae play a big role in the carbon cycle in the valleys. She described invertebrate soil communities in the Dry Valleys of Victoria Land and devised some of the first models of habitat suitability for specific invertebrate species in the Dry Valleys, which increased our understanding of their susceptibility to environmental change and their roles in biogeochemical processes.

Wall served as president of the American Institute of Biological Sciences, the Ecological Society of America, the Association of Ecosystem Research Centers, and the Society of Nematologists. Wall also served as the Chair of the Council of Scientific Society Presidents in 2003 and in 2011 was appointed the Chair of the Global Soil Biodiversity Initiative. She was elected a member of the National Academy of Sciences in 2018.

== Awards and honors ==
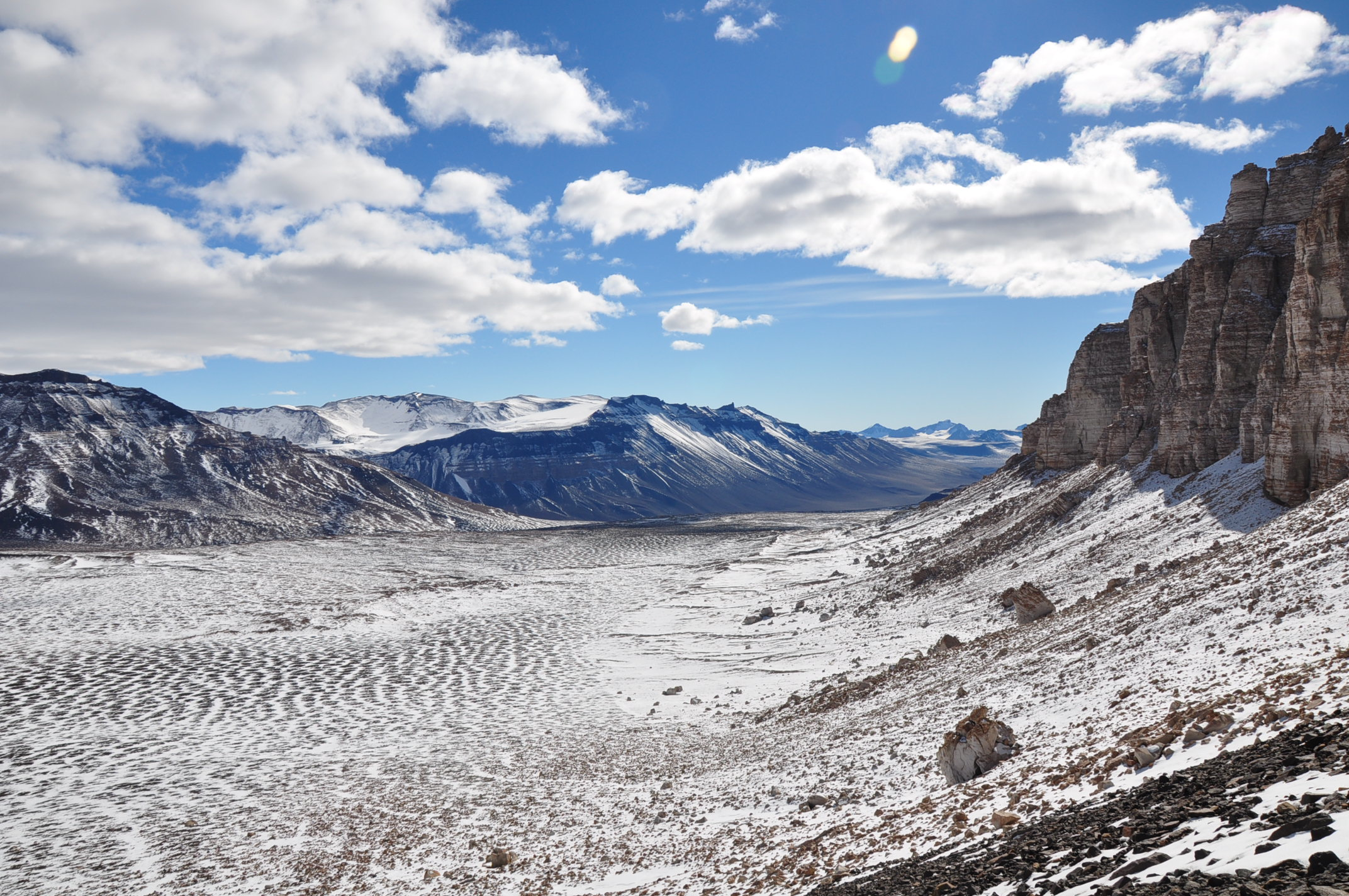
Wall Valley, Antarctica

Wall received the 2012 Mines Medal from the South Dakota School of Mines and Technology, the Scientific Committee for Antarctic Research President's Medal for Excellence in Antarctic Research, and the Soil Ecology Society Professional Achievement Award.

Wall was named a Fellow of the Aldo Leopold Leadership Program in 1999. She was selected as the 2012 Tansley Lecturer of the British Ecological Society. She was one of the inaugural Fellows of the Ecological Society of America in 2012.

Wall was awarded the Tyler Prize for Environmental Achievement in 2013 and was inducted into the Colorado Women's Hall of Fame in 2014. She was elected to the American Academy of Arts and Sciences and named a Fellow of the American Association for the Advancement of Science in 2014. Wall was awarded University College Dublin's highest honour, the Ulysses Medal, in 2015.

Wall Valley in the McMurdo Dry Valleys of Antarctica was named for her due to her extensive research on soil biology, including spending 13 field seasons there at the time of the naming.

== Other activities ==
Wall chaired the DIVERSITAS-International Biodiversity Observation (2001–2002) and the Global Litter Invertebrate Decomposition Experiment. She also co-chaired the Millennium Development Goals Committee of the Millennium Ecosystem Assessment and the AAAS panel for the What We Know initiative from 2013 to 2014. Wall was a member of one of the President's Council of Advisors on Science and Technology (PCAST) working groups and a member of the UNESCO International Hydrological Program US National Committee. She was a board member of the Island Press and the World Resources Institute.

Wall died on March 25, 2024.
