= Apocalypse Peaks =

Group of Peaks in Victorialand (Eastern Antarctica)

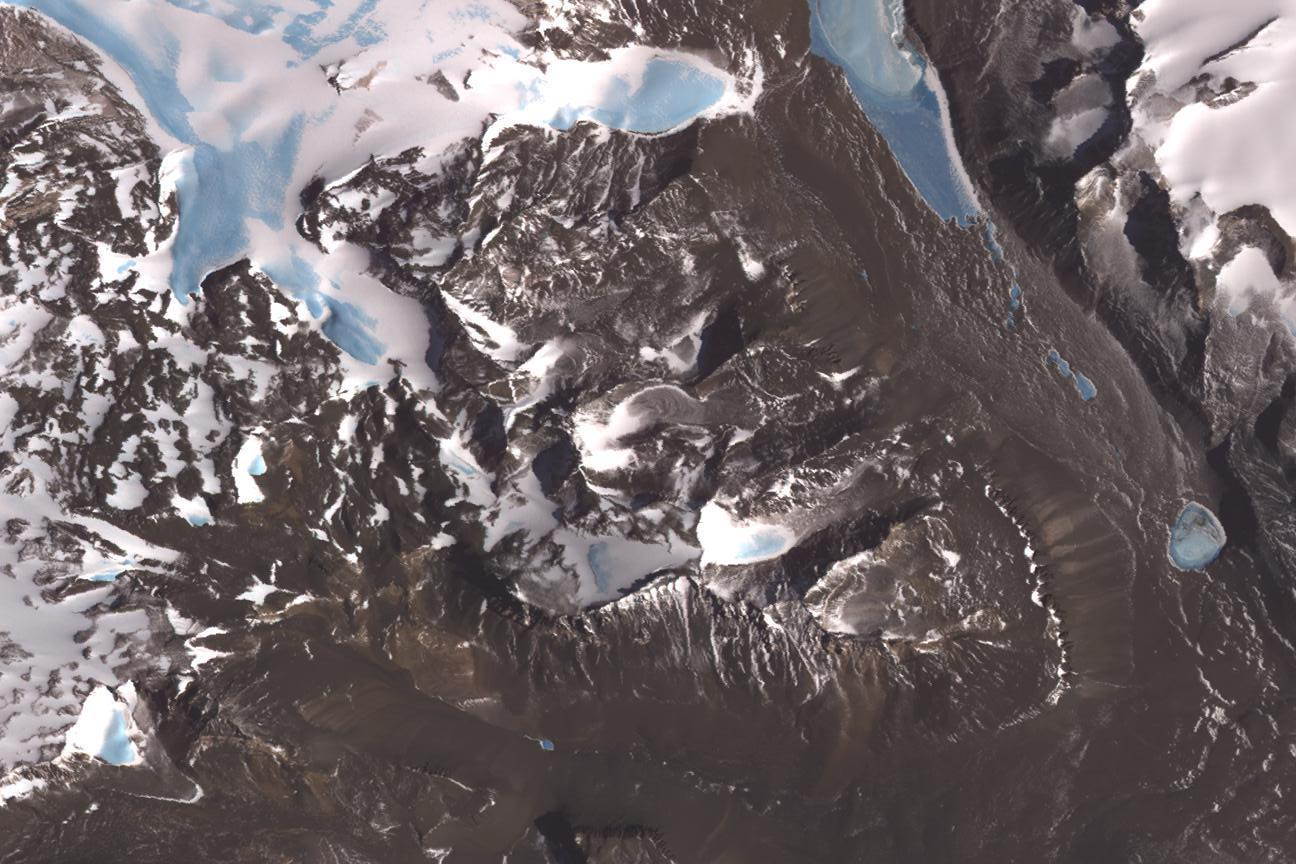
- Satellite image of the Apocalypse Peaks

Geography
- Location within Antarctica
- Continent: Antarctica
- Region: Victoria Land
- Range coordinates: 77°23′S 160°51′E

The Apocalypse Peaks (77°23′S 160°51′E) are a group of peaks with a highest point of 2,360 metres (7,740 ft), standing east of Willett Range and between Barwick Valley and Balham Valley, in Victoria Land, Antarctica.

== Name ==
The Apocalypse Peaks were so named by the Victoria University of Wellington Antarctic Expedition (1958–59) because the peaks are cut by talus slopes which gives them the appearance of the "Riders of the Apocalypse."

== Location ==
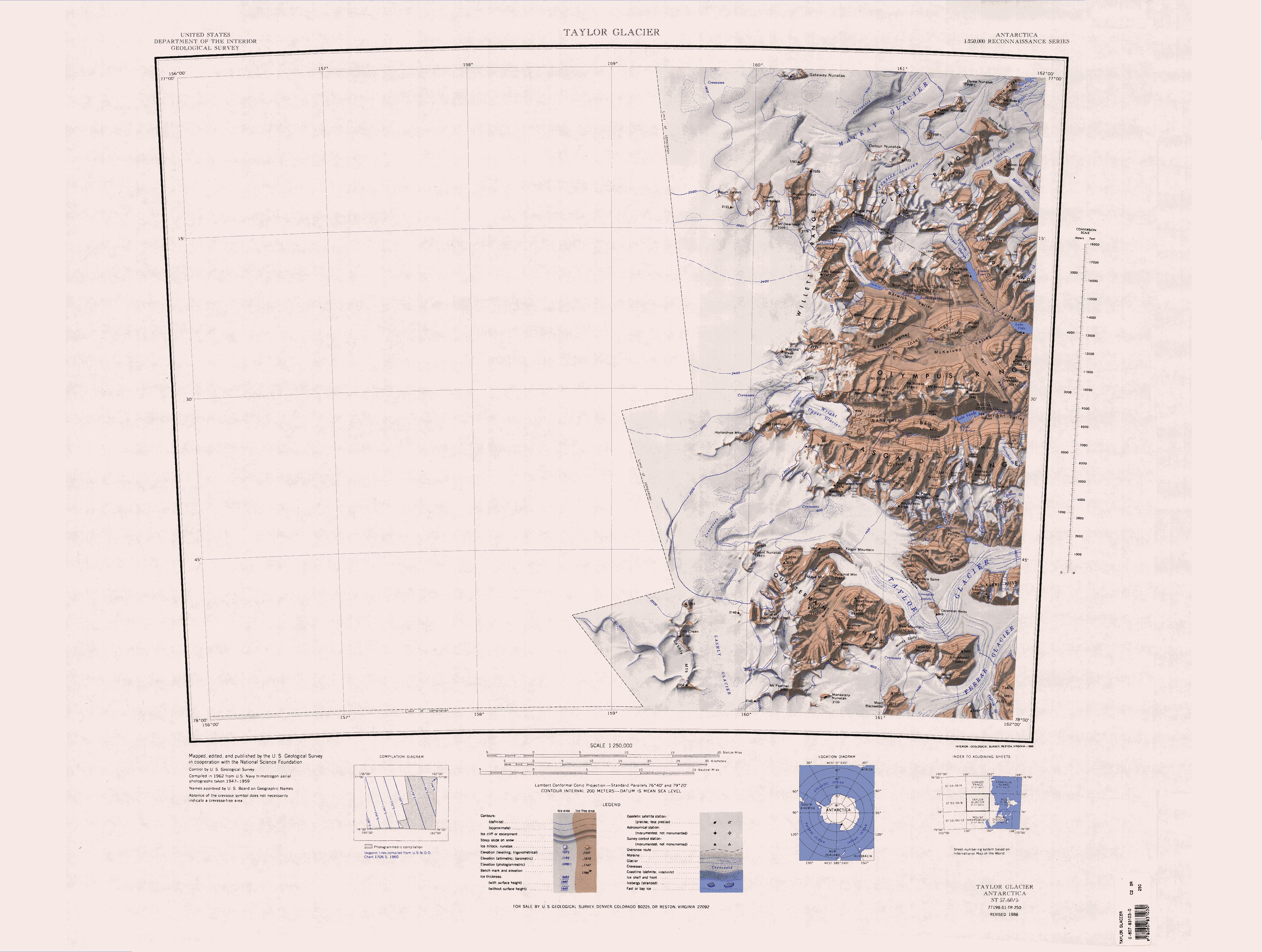
Insel Range north of center of mapped region

The Apocalypse Peaks are bounded by the Barwick Valley to the northeast and the Balham Valley to the southeast. The Willett Range lies to the west, the Cruzen Range (formerly part of the Clare Range) to the north, the Insel Range to the southeast and the Olympus Range to the south.

== Southern features ==
Features of the south of the peaks include, from west to east,

=== Edbrooke Hill ===
77.394444°S 160.638333°E. A hill, 2,100 metres (6,900 ft) high, at the extreme west end of the Apocalypse Peaks. The hill rises 100 metres (330 ft) high above the adjacent plateau ice, which diverges at the hill to the east-northeast-flowing Haselton Glacier and the east-flowing Huka Kapo Glacier. Named by New Zealand Geographic Board (NZGB) (2005) after Steven Edbrooke, geologist, New Zealand Geological Survey, who mapped coal measures at Mount Fleming, Shapeless Mountain, and Mount Electra in 1982-83; in upper Wright Valley, Clare Range, and Willett Range, 1992-93.

=== Huka Kapo Glacier ===
77.40134°S 160.700585°E. A glacier from the plateau of Willett Range. It flows east, southward of Edbrooke Hill, and terminates nearly midway along the south side of Apocalypse Peaks. “Huka Kapo” is a Maori word, meaning driving hail, and was applied descriptively to this glacier by the New Zealand Geographic Board in 2005.

=== Bryan Glacier ===
77.4041667°S 160.9291667°E. A glacier that flows south from a divide with Papitashvili Valley. Named by the New Zealand Geographic Board (2005) after John Bryan, an Australian coal geologist who led a party in mapping the Permian coal measures at Mount Fleming, Shapeless Mountain, and Mount Electra during one visit in 1982-83.

=== Rose Crest ===
77.390611°S 160.938061°E. A summit about 2,000 metres (6,600 ft) high at the south end of Wendler Spur. The feature stands between the head of Albert Valley and Papitashvili Valley. Named by the New Zealand Geographic Board (2005) after Geoffrey (Toby) Rose, leader of a party that investigated coal measures in the Mount Bastion and Sponsors Peak area, 1984-85.

=== Pūanu Glacier ===
77.3916667°S 160.9777778°E. A glacier that occupies the upper portion of Papitashvili Valley. “Pūanu” is a Maori word, meaning intense cold, and was applied descriptively to this glacier in 2005 by the New Zealand Geographic Board.

=== Turnbull Peak ===
77.39048°S 161.021851°E. A peak rising to 1,600 metres (5,200 ft) high at the head of Hernandez Valley. Named by the New Zealand Geographic Board (NZGB) (2005) after Ian Turnbull, an Institute of Geology and Nuclear Sciences geologist, who was a member of geology mapping parties at Asgard Range, Victoria Valley, Saint Johns Range, and at the Mackay Glacier and Wilson Piedmont Glacier areas in several field seasons 1988-89 to 1997-98.

== Northern features ==
Features of the north of the peaks include, from west to east,

=== Mount Dragovan ===
77.381343°S 160.707434°E. The highest summit in Apocalypse Peaks, rising to 2,360 metres (7,740 ft) high west of Wreath Valley in the west part of the group. Named by Advisory Committee on Antarctic Names (US-ACAN) (2005) after astronomer Mark W. Dragovan, who (1986) collaborated with Yerkes engineer Robert J. Pernic to build a telescope to observe the early formation of structure in the universe; nine field seasons at the Amundsen-Scott South Pole Station Center for Astrophysical Research in Antarctica, 1988-2000.

=== Lazzara Ledge ===
77.376868°S 160.769899°E. A flat-topped ridge rising to 1,900 metres (6,200 ft) high northeast of Mount Dragovan. The ledge comprises the central part of the divide between Haselton Glacier and Wreath Valley. Named by US-ACAN (2005) after Matthew A. Lazzara of the United States Antarctic Project (USAP) Antarctic Meteorological Research Center field team, who worked in the McMurdo Station area and at other Antarctic locations in eight summer seasons, 1994-2004.

=== Wreath Valley ===
77.378213°S 160.825878°E. An ice-free valley between Lazzara Ledge and Conway Peak. It is the westmost in a group of four aligned hanging valleys. So named by US-ACAN (2005) from an ice and rock formation on the valley headwall, which is wreathlike in appearance and visible from a great distance.

=== Conway Peak ===
77.370278°S 160.895833°E. An ice-free peak which rises to 1,800 metres (5,900 ft) high between the foot of Wreath Valley and Albert Valley. Named by Advisory Committee on Antarctic Names (US-ACAN) (2005) after Maurice Conway of Thames, New Zealand; field guide in eight summer seasons for German expeditions to Victoria Land, Marie Byrd Land, and Queen Maud Land, 1979-2000; field guide/technician in six seasons, 1997-2004, for United States Antarctic Project (USAP) at Roosevelt Island and west Marie Byrd Land ice streams.

=== Wendler Spur ===
77°22′30″S 160°58′30″E. A rock spur that descends north between Albert Valley and Papitashvili Valley. Named by US-ACAN (2005) after Gerd Wendler, Geophysical Institute, University of Alaska, Fairbanks, AK; a USAP member in an international collaboration (France, Australia, United States) to study katabatic winds and their interaction with sea ice at Adélie Coast and George V Coast; several field seasons 1979-2001.

=== Besson Spur ===
77.383333°S 161.029167°E. A rock spur that descends north between Papitashvili Valley and Hernandez Valley. Named by Advisory Committee on Antarctic Names (US-ACAN) (2005) after David Z. Besson, Physics Department, University of Kansas, Lawrence, KS; AMANDA and related research at Amundsen-Scott South Pole Station; eight field seasons 1997-2004.

== Sources ==
- Alberts, Fred G., ed. (1995), Geographic Names of the Antarctic (PDF) (2 ed.), United States Board on Geographic Names This article incorporates public domain material from websites or documents of the United States Board on Geographic Names.
- "Besson Spur", Geographic Names Information System, United States Geological Survey, United States Department of the Interior
- "Bryan Glacier", Geographic Names Information System, United States Geological Survey, United States Department of the Interior
- "Conway Peak", Geographic Names Information System, United States Geological Survey, United States Department of the Interior
- "Edbrooke Hill", Geographic Names Information System, United States Geological Survey, United States Department of the Interior
- "Huka Kapo Glacier", Geographic Names Information System, United States Geological Survey, United States Department of the Interior
- "Lazzara Ledge", Geographic Names Information System, United States Geological Survey, United States Department of the Interior
- "Mount Dragovan", Geographic Names Information System, United States Geological Survey, United States Department of the Interior
- "Pūanu Glacier", Geographic Names Information System, United States Geological Survey, United States Department of the Interior
- "Rose Crest", Geographic Names Information System, United States Geological Survey, United States Department of the Interior
- Taylor Glacier, USGS: United States Geological Survey
- "Turnbull Peak", Geographic Names Information System, United States Geological Survey, United States Department of the Interior
- Wendler Spur, AADC Australian Antarctic Data Centre
- "Wreath Valley", Geographic Names Information System, United States Geological Survey, United States Department of the Interior

This article incorporates public domain material from websites or documents of the United States Geological Survey.
