= Insel Range =

Mountain range in Victoria Land, Antarctica

Asgard Range
- Location within Antarctica

Geography
- Continent: Antarctica
- Region: Victoria Land
- Range coordinates: 77°24′S 161°18′E

The Insel Range (77°24′S 161°18′E) is a series of ice-free flat-topped peaks resembling islands which rise above the surrounding terrain and separate McKelvey Valley from Balham Valley, in Victoria Land, Antarctica. It was so named by the Victoria University of Wellington Antarctic Expedition (VUWAE, 1958–59) because of the resemblance to islands.

== Location ==
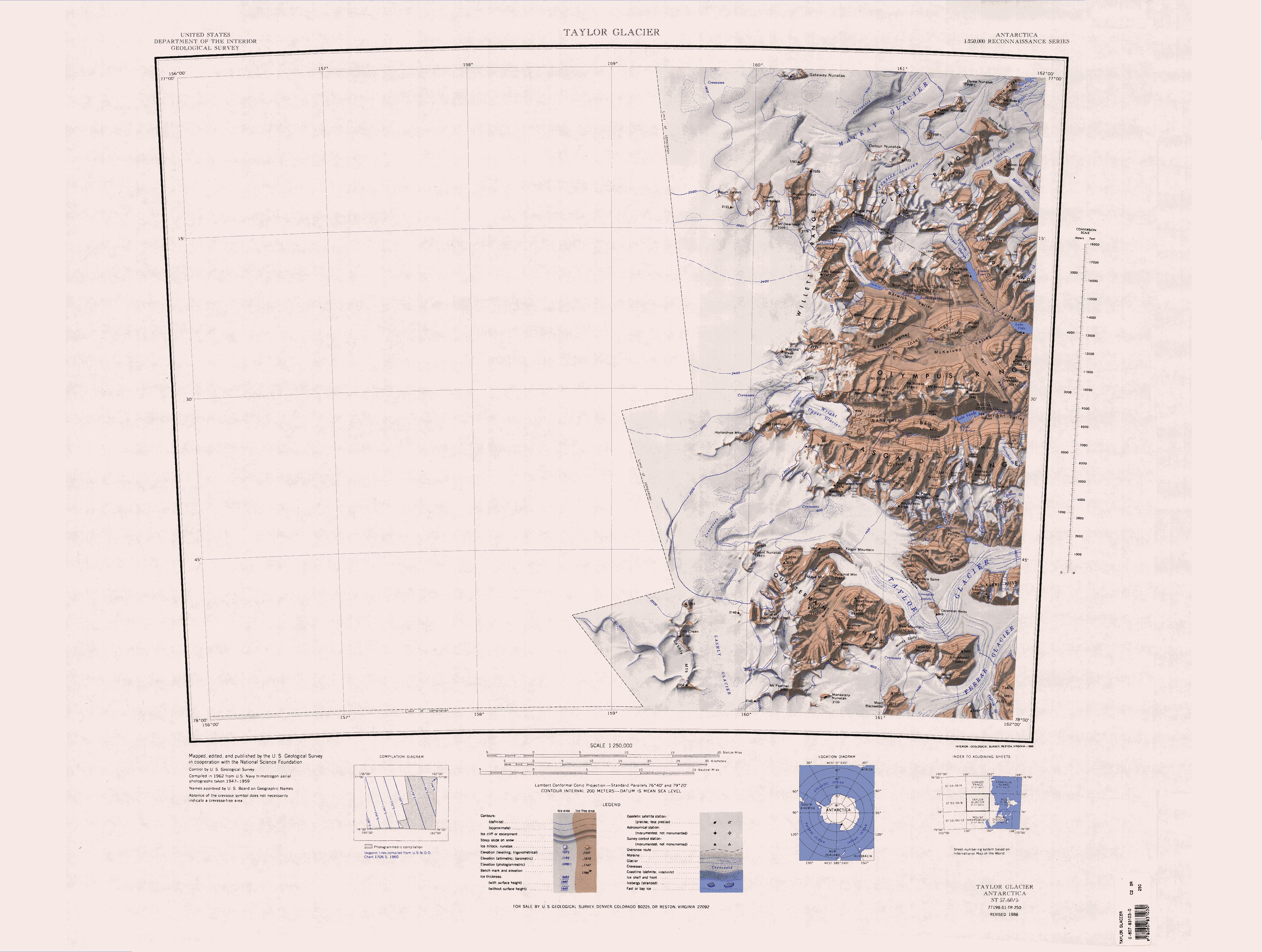
Insel Range north of center of mapped region

The Insel Range is separated from the Olympus Range to the south by the McKelvey Valley. To the north it is separated from the Apocalypse Peaks by the Balham Valley, and from the Clare Range by the Barwick Valley. To the northeast it is separated from the Saint Johns Range by the Victoria Valley. The highest point in the range is Mount Insel.

== Features ==
=== Mount Insel ===
77°23′S 161°32′E. The highest point in the northeast part of the Insel Range. Named by the VUWAE (1958-59) in association with Insel Range.

=== Bullseye Lake ===
77°25′S 161°15′E. A very small pond lying near the center of an elliptical depression in the Insel Range, 4.5 nautical miles (8.3 km; 5.2 mi) northeast of Mount Boreas. The name was applied in 1964 by American geologist Parker E. Calkin and is apparently descriptive of its position and small size.

=== Green Mesa ===
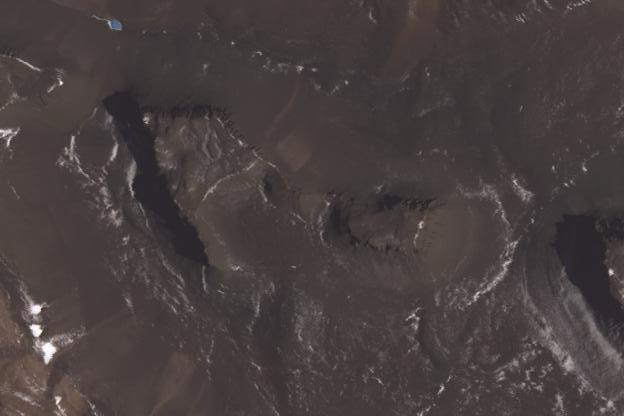
Satellite view of Green and Canfield Mesas 2009

77.433333°S 161.05°E An ice-free mesa of 1 nautical mile (1.9 km; 1.2 mi) extent, located 0.9 nautical miles (1.7 km; 1.0 mi) west-southwest of Canfield Mesa in the west part of Insel Range. Named by Advisory Committee on Antarctic Names (US-ACAN) (1997) after William J. Green, School of Interdisciplinary Studies, Miami University, Oxford, Ohio, who from the 1968-69 season made studies of lakes and streams in Taylor Valley and Wright Valley, including a geochemical analysis of the Onyx River and Lake Vanda with Donald E. Canfield (Canfield Mesa) in 1980-81, 1986-87, and 1987-88; co-editor (with E. Imre Friedmann) of Physical and Biogeochemical Processes in Antarctic Lakes, Antarctic Research Series, Vol. 59, American Geophysical Union, 1993.

=== Canfield Mesa ===
77.422863°S 161.171451°E An ice-free mesa of 0.8 nautical miles (1.5 km; 0.92 mi) extent, located 0.9 nautical miles (1.7 km; 1.0 mi) east-northeast of Green Mesa in the west part of Insel Range. Named by Advisory Committee on Antarctic Names (US-ACAN) (1997) after Donald E. Canfield, School of Interdisciplinary Studies, Miami University, Oxford, Ohio, who made a geochemical analysis of the Onyx River and Lake Vanda with William J. Green (Green Mesa) in the 1980-81, 1986-87, and 1987-88 field seasons.

=== Halzen Mesa ===
77.39415°S 161.431244°E An oblong islandlike mesa, 5 nautical miles (9.3 km; 5.8 mi) long and rising to 1,345 metres (4,413 ft), that is the largest and eastmost of three mesas in the Insel Range. The upper surface is relatively level but the periphery is marked by abrupt cliffs that rise 500 to 600 metres (1,600 to 2,000 ft) high above the floor of Barwick Valley and McKelvey Valley. Named by Advisory Committee on Antarctic Names (US-ACAN) (2005) after Francis Halzen, Physics Department, University of Wisconsin, Madison, WI, who conceived of the Antarctic Muon And Neutrino Detector Array (AMANDA) at Amundsen-Scott South Pole Station in 1998; United States Antarctic Project (United States ArmyP) principal investigator in a project to build the “IceCube” neutrino telescope at the South Pole Station in six field seasons beginning 2004-05.

== Sources ==
- Alberts, Fred G., ed. (1995), Geographic Names of the Antarctic (PDF) (2 ed.), United States Board on Geographic Names This article incorporates public domain material from websites or documents of the United States Board on Geographic Names.
- "Canfield Mesa", Geographic Names Information System, United States Geological Survey, United States Department of the Interior
- "Green Mesa", Geographic Names Information System, United States Geological Survey, United States Department of the Interior
- "Halzen Mesa", Geographic Names Information System, United States Geological Survey, United States Department of the Interior
- Taylor Glacier, USGS: United States Geological Survey

This article incorporates public domain material from websites or documents of the United States Geological Survey.
