= Wright Upper Glacier =

Glacier in Antarctica

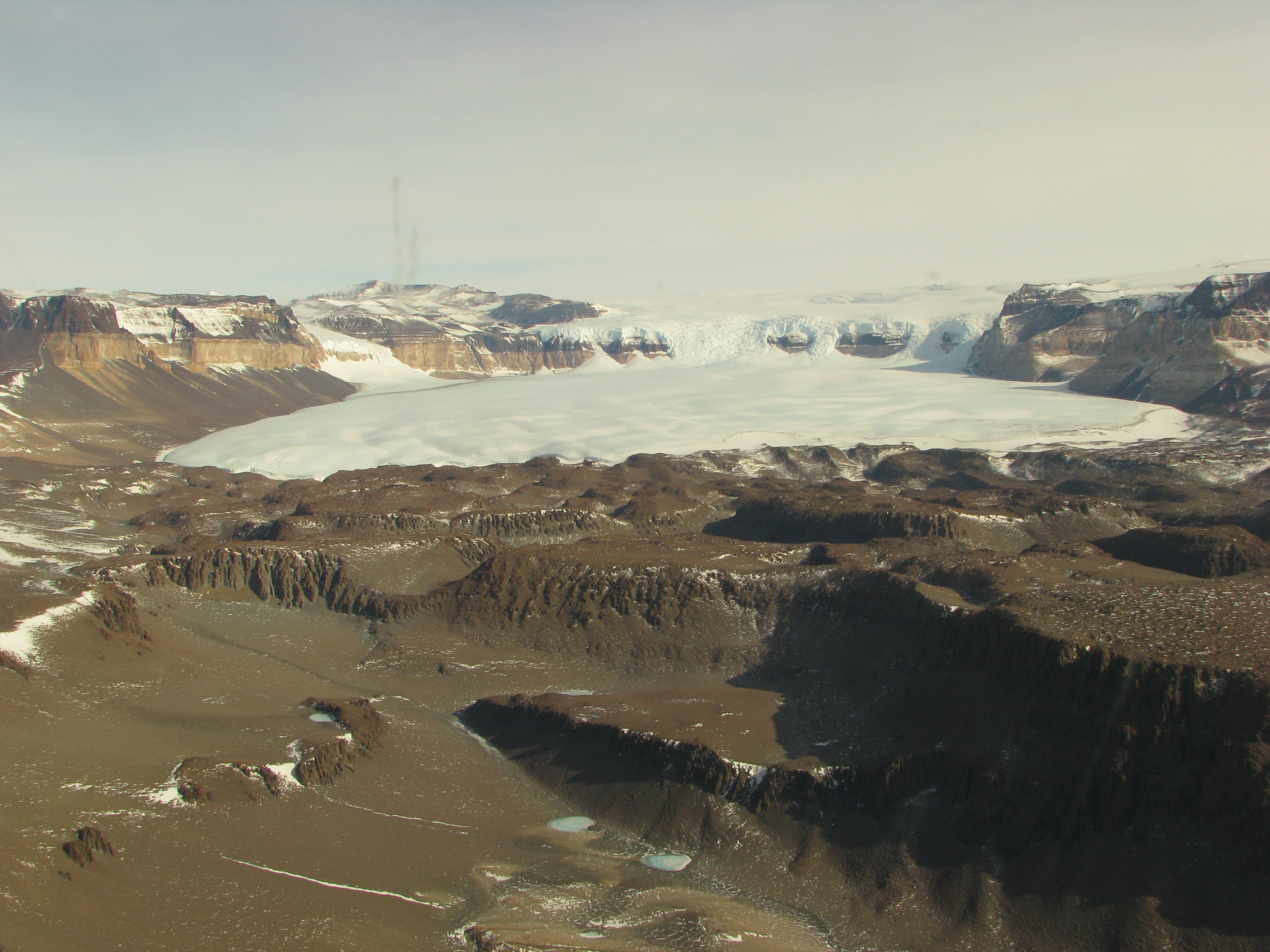
- Wright Upper Glacier viewed from the air. Airdevronsix icefalls visible at head of glacier. Labyrinth is in the foreground.

- Location within Antarctica
- Location: Ross Dependency
- Coordinates: 77°32′S 160°35′E
- Terminus: Ross Sea

Wright Upper Glacier (77°32′S 160°35′E) is an ice apron at the upper west end of Wright Valley in the Asgard Range, Antarctica. It is formed by a glacier flowing east from the inland ice plateau. It was named by the Victoria University of Wellington Antarctic Expedition (VUWAE) (1958–59) for C. S. Wright, a member of the British Antarctic Expedition (1910–13), after whom the "Wright Glacier" (adjusted to Wright Lower Glacier by the VUWAE) was named.

== Location ==
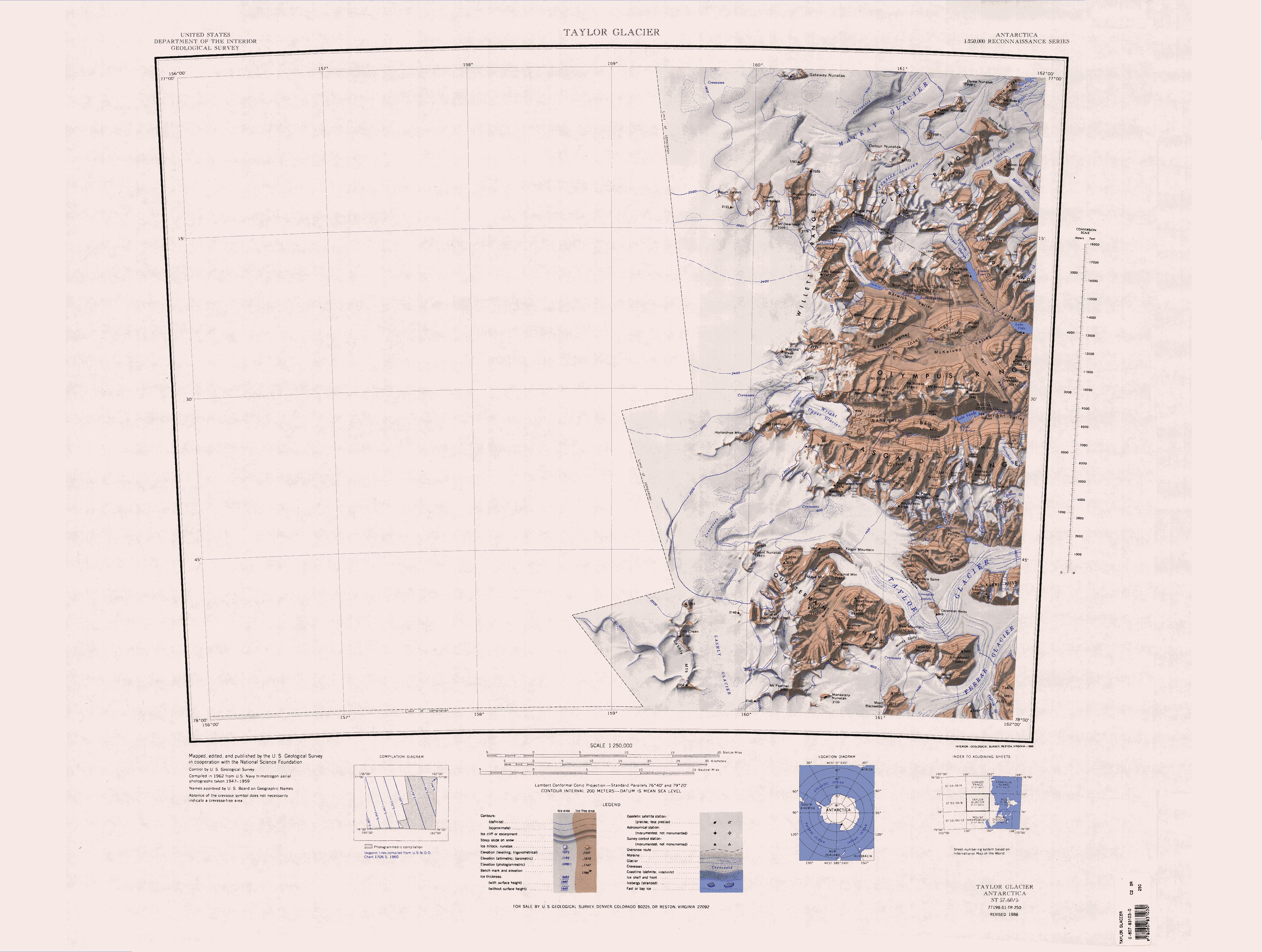
Asgard Range south of center of mapped region. Wright Upper Glacier at west end of the range.

The head of the Wright Upper Glacier is to the east of the Antarctic Plateau, Horseshoe Mountain and Mount Fleming. To their north, the glacier is fed by the Airdevronsix Icefalls, and to their south the Warren Icefalls and Vortex Col descend into the glacier. Mount Baldr, at the eastern end of the Asgard Range, is south of the glacier, and the Labyrinth is to the east. Apollo Peak at the west end of the Olympus Range is to the northeast.

== Features ==
=== Airdevronsix Icefalls ===
77°31′S 160°22′E. A line of icefalls at the head of Wright Upper Glacier, in Victoria Land. Named by United States Navy Operation Deep Freeze (1956-57) for United States Navy Air Development Squadron Six, which had been formed to provide air support for the Deep Freeze operations and which had also carried out many important Antarctic exploratory flights. The Airdevronsix icefall is 5 kilometres (3.1 mi) wide and 400 metres (1,300 ft) high.

=== Horseshoe Mountain ===
77°34′S 159°57′E. A mountain just west of Mount Fleming, standing on the north side of the head of Taylor Glacier, near the edge of the polar plateau. Discovered by the British National Antarctic Expedition (BrNAE) (1901-04) and so named because of its shape.

=== Mount Fleming ===
77°33′S 160°06′E. A mountain, over 2,200 metres (7,200 ft) high, standing at the southwest side of Airdevronsix Icefalls and Wright Upper Glacier. Named in 1957 by the N.Z. Northern Survey Party of the Commonwealth Trans-Antarctic Expedition (CTAE) (1956-58) for Doctor C.A. Fleming, Senior Paleontologist of the N.Z. Geological Survey, and Chairman of the Royal Society's Antarctic Research Committee.

=== Medley Ridge ===
77.5355556°S 160.1994444°E A rock ridge that extends northeast from Mount Fleming to the south margin of Wright Upper Glacier, in Victoria Land. Named by US-ACAN (2004) after David Medley, PHI helicopter mechanic with United States Antarctic Project (United States ArmyP) in eight consecutive field seasons from 1996-97.

=== Hallet Valley ===
77.543015°S 160.271998°E A valley between Meddley Ridge and Vortex Col in west Asgard Range, Victoria Land. Named by US-ACAN (2004) after Bernard Hallet, Quaternary Research Center, University of Washington, Seattle, WA; United States Antarctic Project (United States ArmyP) investigator of land surface stability in the McMurdo Dry Valleys, 1995-2002.

=== Warren Icefall ===
77.553371°S 160.445793°E. An icefall entering the south part of Wright Upper Glacier north of Vortex Col. Named by US-ACAN (2004) after Alden Warren, Geography Discipline, United States Geological Survey; photographer (scientific and technical) in the preparation of United States Geological Survey (USGS) maps of Antarctica, 1956-2004. The Warren Icefall is 920 metres (3,020 ft) wide and 400 metres (1,300 ft) high.

=== Vortex Col ===
77°34′S 160°25′E. A col leading from the plateau into the south side of Wright Upper Glacier. At this locality, winds carrying clouds of snow from the polar plateau are deflected by Mount Fleming and funneled down this depression. The descriptive name was given by New Zealand Antarctic Place-Names Committee (NZ-APC).

== Sources ==
- "Airdevronsix icefalls", wondermondo
- Alberts, Fred G., ed. (1995), Geographic Names of the Antarctic (PDF) (2 ed.), United States Board on Geographic Names This article incorporates public domain material from websites or documents of the United States Board on Geographic Names.
- "Hallet Valley", Geographic Names Information System, United States Geological Survey, United States Department of the Interior
- "Medley Ridge", Geographic Names Information System, United States Geological Survey, United States Department of the Interior
- Taylor Glacier, USGS: United States Geological Survey
- "Warren Icefall", Geographic Names Information System, United States Geological Survey, United States Department of the Interior
- "Warren Icefall", Wondermondo, 2014-07-07

This article incorporates public domain material from websites or documents of the United States Geological Survey.
