= Balham Valley =

Valley in Antarctica

- Location within Antarctica

Geography
- Location: Antarctica
- Coordinates: 77°25′S 161°1′E
- Interactive map of Balham Valley

Balham Valley (77°25′S 161°1′E) is an ice-free valley] between the Insel Range and the Apocalypse Peaks, in Victoria Land, Antarctica.

== Name ==
Balham Valley was named by the Victoria University of Wellington Antarctic Expedition (VUWAE: 1958–59) for R.W. Balham, biologist with the New Zealand party of the Commonwealth Trans-Antarctic Expedition who did the first freshwater biology in this area in 1957–58.

== Location ==
Balham Valley is one of the McMurdo Dry Valleys. The head of Balham Valley is below Shapeless Mountain. The valley descends between the Apocalypse Peaks to the north and Olympus Range to the south. It connects to the McKelvey Valley to the south. It flows east-northeast past the Insel Range and joins Barwick Valley.

== Antarctic Specially Protected Area ==
An area of 480 km^{2} (190 sq mi), comprising parts of both Balham Valley and the adjacent Barwick Valley, is protected under the Antarctic Treaty System as Antarctic Specially Protected Area (ASPA)-123 because it is one of the least disturbed or contaminated of the McMurdo Dry Valleys. It is consequently important as a reference base for measuring changes in the similar polar desert ecosystems of the other Dry Valleys where scientific investigations are conducted.

== Features ==
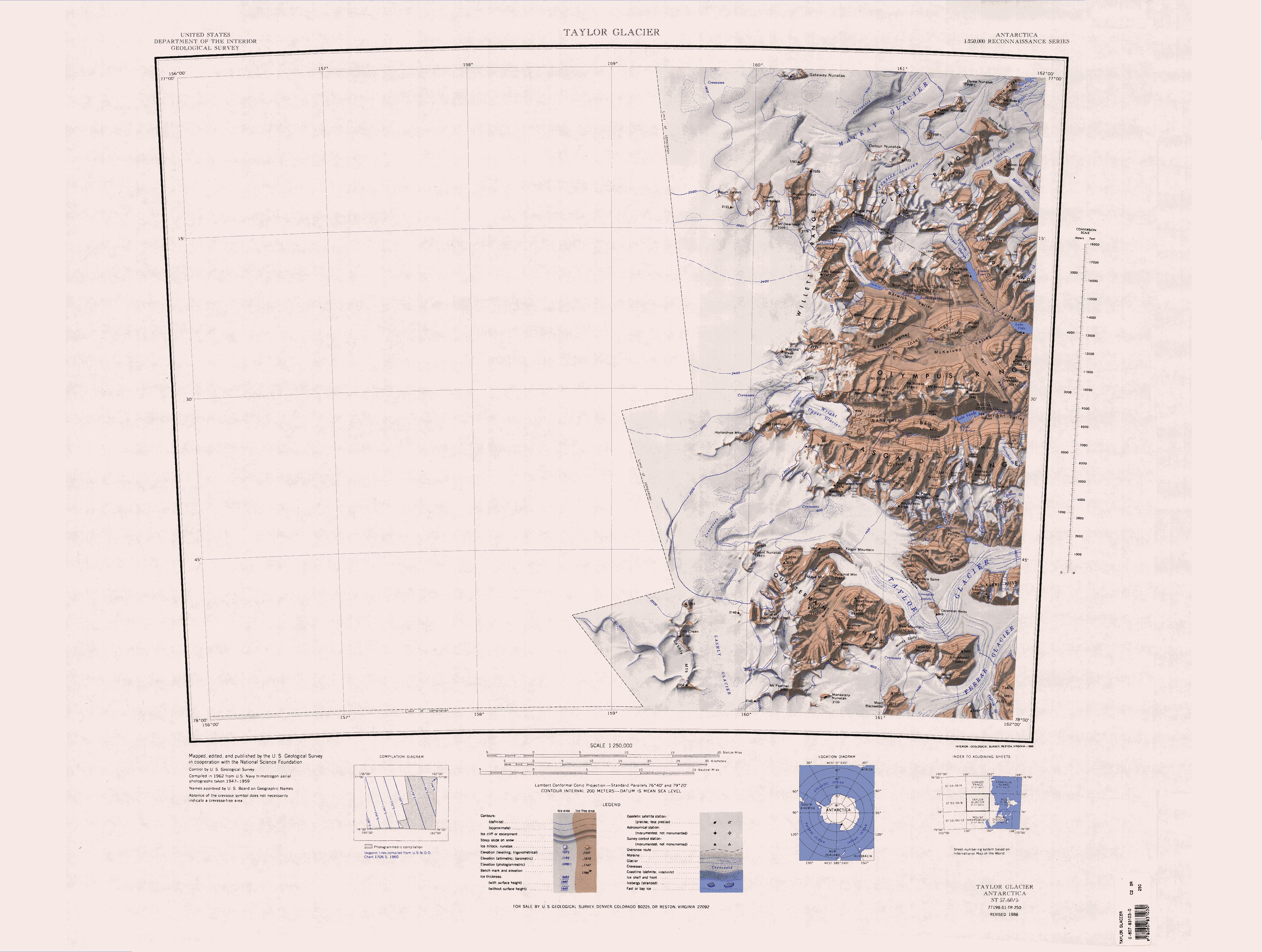
Upper Victoria Valley towards the north of mapped region

Named features include, from west to east, Mistake Peak, Shapeless Mountain and Balham Lake.

=== Mistake Peak ===
77°26′S 160°13′E. Snowy peak, about 2,600 metres (8,500 ft) high, rising 3 nautical miles (5.6 km; 3.5 mi) west-southwest of Shapeless Mountain, at the south end of the Willett Range. So named in 1957 by the N.Z. Northern Survey Party of the Commonwealth Trans-Antarctic Expedition (CTAE) (1956-58), because they mistakenly climbed the mountain in the belief they were on Shapeless Mountain.

=== Shapeless Mountain ===
77°26′S 160°24′E. Massive mountain, 2,740 metres (8,990 ft) high, standing west of the head of Balham Valley. Named in 1957 by the N.Z. Northern Survey Party of the CTAE (1956-58) as being descriptive of its appearance from almost every direction.

=== Rude Spur ===
77°27′S 160°49′E. A rock spur 2 nautical miles (3.7 km; 2.3 mi) northwest of Mount Circe that descends from the plateau of Victoria Land toward Balham Lake and Balham Valley. Named by the United States Advisory Committee on Antarctic Names (US-ACAN) after United States Antarctic Research Program (USARP) oceanographer Jeffrey D. Rude who drowned in McMurdo Sound, October 12, 1975, when the tracked vehicle he was driving broke through bay ice and sank in the vicinity of Erebus Glacier Tongue and Turtle Rock.

=== Balham Lake ===
77°26′S 160°57′E. A small lake near the center of Balham Valley in Victoria Land. Named in 1964 by American geologist Parker E. Calkin for its location in Balham Valley.

== Sources ==
- Alberts, Fred G., ed. (1995), Geographic Names of the Antarctic (PDF) (2 ed.), United States Board on Geographic Names This article incorporates public domain material from websites or documents of the United States Board on Geographic Names.
- Taylor Glacier, USGS: United States Geological Survey

This article incorporates public domain material from websites or documents of the United States Geological Survey.
