= Cruzen Range =

Mountain range in Victoria Land, Antarctica

- Location within Antarctica

Geography
- Continent: Antarctica
- Region: Victoria Land
- Range coordinates: 77°19′17″S 161°09′18″E

The Cruzen Range (77°19′17″S 161°09′18″E) is a mountain range that rises to 1,600 metres (5,200 ft) in Vashka Crag and extends west to east for 10 nautical miles (19 km; 12 mi) between Salyer Ledge and Nickell Peak in the McMurdo Dry Valleys, Victoria Land, Antarctica. The range is bounded to north, east, south and west by the Clare Range, Victoria Valley, Barwick Valley, and the Webb Glacier.

== Name ==
The Cruzen Range was named by the United States Advisory Committee on Antarctic Names (US-ACAP) in 2005 after Rear Admiral Richard H. Cruzen, commander of Task Force 68 during the U.S. Navy Antarctic Developments Project, 1946-47 (Operation Highjump).

== Location ==
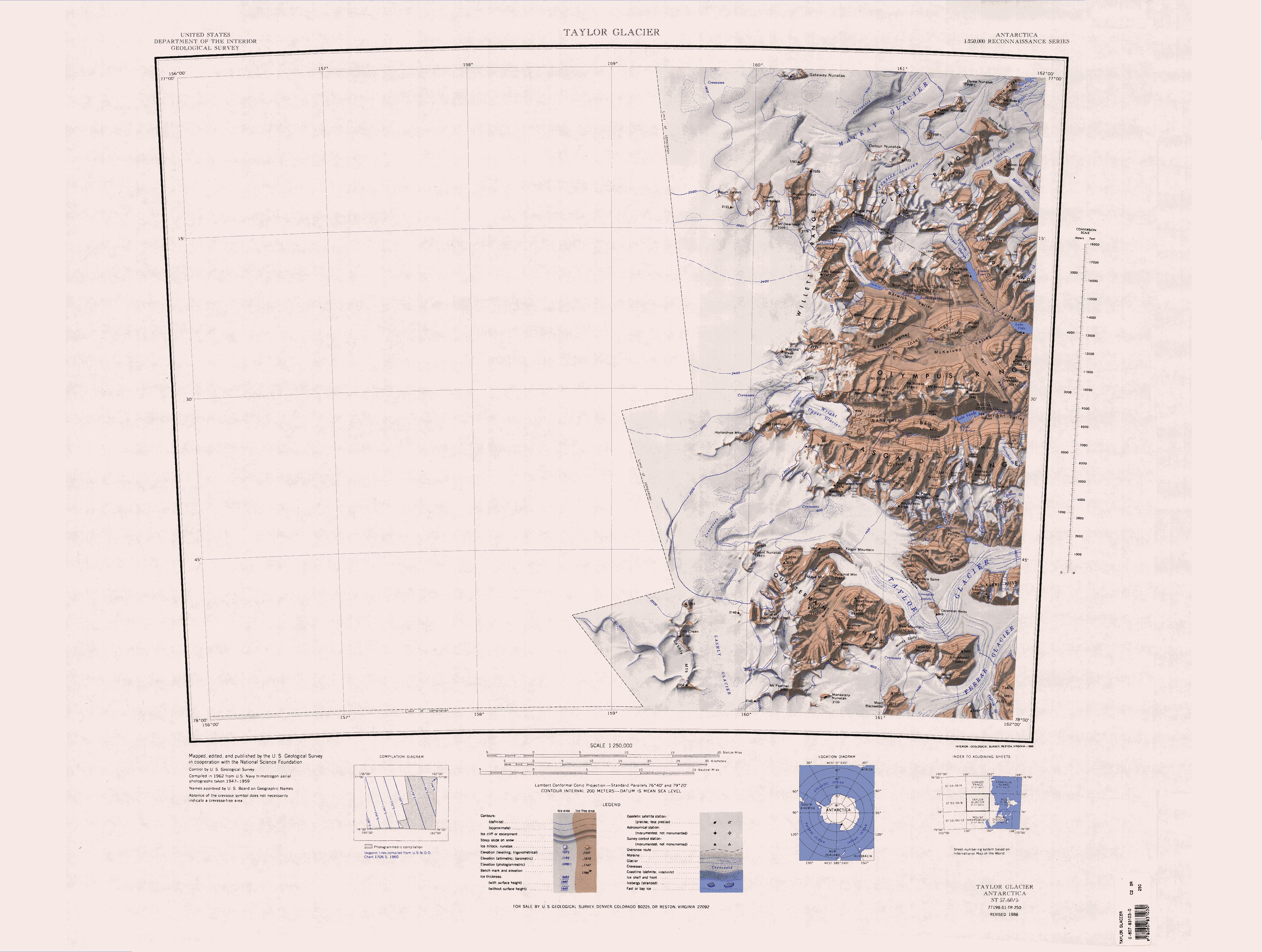
Insel Range north of center of mapped region

The Cruzen Range was formerly the southern part of the Clare Range, to the north. It is separated from the Clare Range by Webb Cirque which holds the névé at the head of the Webb Glacier to the northwest, and Victoria Upper Névé that feeds Victoria Upper Glacier to the northeast. The two are separated by a ridge leading south from Parker Mesa to The Fortress. To the south the range is bounded by the Webb Glacier and Barwick Valley, which runs east to Victoria Valley, below Victoria Upper Glacier. Named features on a 1962 USGS map include The Fortress, Vashka Crag, Nickell Peak, Sponsors Peak and Mount Leland. Since then many more features have been named.

== The Fortress ==
77°18′S 160°55′E. The Fortress is a series of ridges and cirques that comprise the west half of Cruzen Range. It is a platform of Beacon Sandstone dissected to form four promontories bordered by cliffs over 300 metres (980 ft) high. Situated on the shoulder to the northeast of Webb Glacier, they form part of the divide between the Webb Glacier and Victoria Upper Glacier. Named by the Victoria University of Wellington Antarctic Expedition (VUWAE), 1959–60, for its fortress-like appearance.

Features of The Fortress, from west to east, include:

=== Salyer Ledge ===
77.287903°S 160.823308°E A bold flat-topped ridge 1,300 metres (4,300 ft) high at the west end of The Fortress. Named by US-ACAN (2005) after Lieutenant Commander Herbert Salyer, United States Navy, co-pilot and navigator (Commander William Hawkes, R4D command pilot), on the Operation Highjump photographic flight of February 20, 1947, during which this ledge and Cruzen Range were observed for the first time and recorded.

=== Hilt Cirque ===
77.290359°S 160.85282°E The west-most cirque of The Fortress. The cirque is 0.5 nautical miles (0.93 km; 0.58 mi) wide and lies east of Salyer Ledge. Named by US-ACAN (2005) after Lieutenant (jg) J.W. Hilt, United States Navy, pilot of the VX-6 Otter aircraft that obtained low-elevation oblique aerial photographs of St. Johns Range, Willett Range, and Cruzen Range, November 20, 1959.

=== Conrad Ledge ===
77.2927°S 160.881151°E A flat-topped ridge 1 nautical mile (1.9 km; 1.2 mi) long between Hilt Cirque and Dana Cirque. Named by US-ACAN (2005) after Lieutenant Commander Lawrence J. Conrad, United States Navy (Ret.), Squadron VXE-6 helicopter pilot at McMurdo Station, 1982–85; member, United States Antarctic Project (United States ArmyP) project to photograph named geographic features in the McMurdo Sound region, 2003-04.

=== Mahaka Ponds ===
77.300299°S 160.860548°E Two ponds close together at the south end of Conrad Ledge. The New Zealand Geographic Board (NZGB) revised its 2005 decision of Greenfield Ponds to Mahaka Ponds in 2006. Mahaka is a Maori word meaning twin, which is a descriptive name for the two ponds in close proximity.

=== Dana Cirque ===
77.296451°S 160.900233°E A cirque 0.5 nautical miles (0.93 km; 0.58 mi) wide lying east of Conrad Ledge. Named by US-ACAN (2005) after Gayle L. Dana, Biological Research Center, Desert Research Institute, Reno, NV; team member, United States Antarctic Project (United States ArmyP) McMurdo Dry Valleys ecological research, five seasons 1993-2001.

=== Bell Buttress ===
77.304167°S 160.991667°E A forked flat-topped ridge, 1.2 nautical miles (2.2 km; 1.4 mi) long, which extends north from The Fortress into the southwest part of Victoria Upper Névé. Named by US-ACAN (2005) after Robin E. Bell, Lamont-Doherty Earth Observatory, Columbia University, Palisades, NY; aerogeophysical research of the lithosphere of the West Antarctic rift system (CASERTZ), five field seasons 1991-99.

=== Tilav Cirque ===
77.319444°S 160.958333°E A cirque on the northwest side of McLean Buttress. Named by US-ACAN (2005) after Serap Z. Tilav, United States Antarctic Project (USAP) field team member in support of the Antarctic Muon and Neutrino Detector Array (AMANDA) and cosmic-ray studies at Amundsen-Scott South Pole Station; nine field seasons 1991-2005.

=== McLean Buttress ===
77°19′S 160°58′E. A buttress-like mountain or promontory at the north side of Webb Lake and Barwick Valley. It rises abruptly from the valley and marks the south limit of The Fortress. Named by US-ACAN for Captain Frank E. McLean, USCG, Commanding Officer of USCGC Burton Island in the Ross Sea during Operation Deep Freeze 1970 and 1971.

=== Johns Cirque ===
77.323092°S 161.008561°E A cirque on the east side of McLean Buttress. Named by US-ACAN (2005) after Bjorn Johns, project manager from 1996-2005 of University NAVSTAR Consortium (UNAVCO), a consortium of 30 United States Universities that provides support of surveying, mapping, and other applications of the Global Positioning System to the United States Antarctic Project (United States ArmyP).

=== Vashka Crag ===
77°19′S 161°03′E. An abrupt rock crag at the east end of The Fortress. Named by the VUWAE, 1959–60, in association with nearby Lake Vashka, located just below and to the southeast.

=== Gaisser Valley ===
77.328539°S 161.132342°E A mostly ice-free valley 1.5 nautical miles (2.8 km; 1.7 mi) long that descends south from Vashka Crag. The valley is bounded to the east by Peterson Terrace and terminates as a hanging valley 0.5 nautical miles (0.93 km; 0.58 mi) northwest of Lake Vashka. Named by US-ACAN (2005) after Thomas K. Gaisser, Bartol Research Institute, University of Delaware, Newark, DE; United States Antarctic Project (United States ArmyP) principal investigator for study of cosmic-ray showers at Amundsen-Scott South Pole Station, 1991-2005.

== Other features ==
Other features, from west to east, include:

=== Loewenstein Peak ===
77.303954°S 161.138315°E An ice-free peak, 1,539 metres (5,049 ft) high, located 0.75 nautical miles (1.39 km; 0.86 mi) northeast of Vashka Crag. It stands at the west end of a line of peaks that mark the divide in east Cruzen Range. Named by US-ACAN (2005) after Robert F. Loewenstein, University of Chicago and Yerkes Observatory; member of the United States Antarctic Project (United States ArmyP) astrophysical research team at Amundsen-Scott South Pole Station, 13 field seasons 1991-2004.

=== Forsyth Peak ===
77.306818°S 161.170485°E A peak rising to 1,500 metres (4,900 ft) high 0.5 nautical miles (0.93 km; 0.58 mi) east of Loewenstein Peak. Named by the New Zealand Geographic Board (NZGB) (2005) after geologist Jane Forsyth, a member of geological mapping parties in this area during five seasons from 1988, including work at Willett Range, Clare Range, and Victoria Valley.

=== Peterson Terrace ===
77.32823°S 161.20013°E A gently inclined, mostly ice-free area about 1.5 nautical miles (2.8 km; 1.7 mi) sq between Gaisser Valley and LaBelle Valley. The terrace rises to 1,250 metres (4,100 ft) high, 750 metres (2,460 ft) above Barwick Valley and Lake Vashka, close southward. Named by US-ACAN (2005) after Jeffrey B. Peterson, Physics Department, Carnegie-Mellon University, Pittsburgh, PA; astrophysics research at Amundsen-Scott South Pole Station, 14 field seasons 1988-2005.

=== Price Terrace ===
77.327651°S 161.301674°E A relatively level ice-free area about 1 square nautical mile (3.4 km^{2}; 1.3 sq mi) between LaBelle Valley and Berkey Valley. The terrace rises to 1,250 metres (4,100 ft) high, about 750 metres (2,460 ft) high above Barwick Valley close southward. Named by US-ACAN (2005) after P. Buford Price, Physics Department, University of California at Berkeley, a United States Antarctic Project (United States ArmyP) principal investigator for cosmic-ray studies near McMurdo Station, 1989, and neutrino astrophysics research at Amundsen-Scott South Pole Station, 1991.

=== Kreutz Snowfield ===
77.290858°S 161.245952°E An intermontane snowfield 3 square nautical miles (10 km^{2}; 4.0 sq mi). The snowfield is bounded to south by Forsyth Peak, to west by Victoria Upper Névé, to north by Mount Leland, and to east by Mount Isaac. Named by US-ACAN (2005) after Karl J. Kreutz, Department of Geological Sciences, The University of Maine, Orono, ME, who investigated late Holocene climate variability from Siple Dome ice cores, three field seasons 1994-97; from Taylor Glacier and Clark Glacier ice cores, two seasons 2003-05.

=== Mount Novak ===
77.283698°S 161.281122°E An elongated mountain, about 1,400 metres (4,600 ft) high, 0.7 nautical miles (1.3 km; 0.81 mi) south of Mount Leland. Named by US-ACAN (2005) after Giles Novak, Department of Physics and Astronomy, Northwestern University, Evanston, IL; member of the United States Antarctic Project (United States ArmyP) astrophysics team at Amundsen-Scott South Pole Station; 11 summer seasons 1992-2004.

=== Mount Leland ===
77°16′S 161°18′E. Rock peak 1 nautical mile (1.9 km; 1.2 mi) west of Victoria Upper Glacier. Named by US-ACAN for Captain Bainbridge B. Leland, United States Coats Guard, Commanding Officer of USCGC Burton Island during Operation Deep Freeze 1968 and 1969.

=== Mount Isaac ===
77.295367°S 161.320315°E A mountain 0.9 nautical miles (1.7 km; 1.0 mi) southeast of Mount Novak. It rises to 1,250 metres (4,100 ft) high at the head of Alexander Valley, dividing the south part of the valley. Named by the New Zealand Geographic Board (2005) after Mike Isaac, a geologist who led a scientific party during two visits in 1985 and 1992.

=== Sponsors Peak ===
77°18′S 161°24′E. Mountain, over 1,600 metres (5,200 ft) high, at the west side of the mouth of Victoria Upper Glacier. Named by the VUWAE (1958–59) after sponsors who materially assisted the expedition.

=== Shulman Peak ===
77.307928°S 161.37333°E A peak rising to 1,400 metres (4,600 ft) high, 0.5 nautical miles (0.93 km; 0.58 mi) southwest of Sponsors Peak. Named by US-ACAN (2005) after Leonard M. Shulman, Bartol Research Institute, University of Delaware, Newark, DE, who maintained, calibrated, and upgraded neutron monitors at Amundsen-Scott South Pole Station and McMurdo Station, 13 field seasons 1991-2005.

=== Alexander Valley ===
77.285441°S 161.393322°E A valley 1.5 nautical miles (2.8 km; 1.7 mi) long between Mount Leland and Sponsors Peak. The lower end of the valley is ice free and opens to Victoria Upper Glacier. The upper portion is partly ice covered and is surmounted by Mount Isaac, 1,250 metres (4,100 ft) high. Named by US-ACAN (2005) after Stephen Paul Alexander, United States Antarctic Project (USAP) marine biologist in study of McMurdo Sound benthic foraminifer, six seasons 1985-2001; laboratory manager, Crary Science and Engineering Center, McMurdo Station, three seasons 2002-04.

=== Dickinson Valley ===
77.315706°S 161.43688°E A valley 1.2 nautical miles (2.2 km; 1.4 mi) long on the west side of Nickell Peak. Named by the New Zealand Geographic Board (2005) after Warren Dickinson, a geologist studying quaternary geology, who led Victoria University's Antarctic Expeditions (VUWAE) field parties working in the McMurdo Dry Valleys during five seasons from 1996.

=== Nickell Peak ===
77°19′S 161°28′E. An ice free peak standing at the west side of Victoria Upper Lake, 1 nautical mile (1.9 km; 1.2 mi) southeast of Sponsors Peak. Named by US-ACAN for Gregory W. Nickell, manager of the Eklund Biological Center, and of the Thiel Earth Sciences Laboratory at McMurdo Station. He died accidentally on May 15, 1974, when a truck he was driving left the road between McMurdo Station and Scott Base.

== Sources ==
- Alberts, Fred G., ed. (1995), Geographic Names of the Antarctic (PDF) (2 ed.), United States Board on Geographic Names This article incorporates public domain material from websites or documents of the United States Board on Geographic Names.
- "Alexander Valley", Geographic Names Information System, United States Geological Survey, United States Department of the Interior
- "Bell Buttress", Geographic Names Information System, United States Geological Survey, United States Department of the Interior
- "Conrad Ledge", Geographic Names Information System, United States Geological Survey, United States Department of the Interior
- "Cruzen Range", Geographic Names Information System, United States Geological Survey, United States Department of the Interior
- "Dana Cirque", Geographic Names Information System, United States Geological Survey, United States Department of the Interior
- "Dickinson Valley", Geographic Names Information System, United States Geological Survey, United States Department of the Interior
- "Forsyth Peak", Geographic Names Information System, United States Geological Survey, United States Department of the Interior
- "Gaisser Valley", Geographic Names Information System, United States Geological Survey, United States Department of the Interior
- "Hilt Cirque", Geographic Names Information System, United States Geological Survey, United States Department of the Interior
- "Johns Cirque", Geographic Names Information System, United States Geological Survey, United States Department of the Interior
- "Kreutz Snowfield", Geographic Names Information System, United States Geological Survey, United States Department of the Interior
- "Loewenstein Peak", Geographic Names Information System, United States Geological Survey, United States Department of the Interior
- "Mahaka Ponds", Geographic Names Information System, United States Geological Survey, United States Department of the Interior
- "Mount Isaac", Geographic Names Information System, United States Geological Survey, United States Department of the Interior
- "Mount Novak", Geographic Names Information System, United States Geological Survey, United States Department of the Interior
- "Peterson Terrace", Geographic Names Information System, United States Geological Survey, United States Department of the Interior
- "Price Terrace", Geographic Names Information System, United States Geological Survey, United States Department of the Interior
- "Salyer Ledge", Geographic Names Information System, United States Geological Survey, United States Department of the Interior
- "Shulman Peak", Geographic Names Information System, United States Geological Survey, United States Department of the Interior
- Taylor Glacier, USGS: United States Geological Survey
- "Tilav Cirque", Geographic Names Information System, United States Geological Survey, United States Department of the Interior

This article incorporates public domain material from websites or documents of the United States Geological Survey.
