= McKelvey Valley =

Valley in Antarctica

- Location within Antarctica

Geography
- Location: Antarctica
- Coordinates: 77°26′S 161°24′E
- Interactive map of McKelvey Valley

McKelvey Valley (77°26′S 161°24′E) is a valley between the western part of the Olympus Range and the Insel Range, in Victoria Land, Antarctica.

== Exploration and naming ==
The McKelvey Valley was named by the Victoria University of Wellington Antarctic Expedition (VUWAE) (1958–59) for Barrie Cooper McKelvey, a geologist of the Victoria University of Wellington, who, with P.N. Webb, undertook the first geological exploration of this area (1957–58), and was again in Wright Valley with the VUWAE in 1958–59.

== Location ==
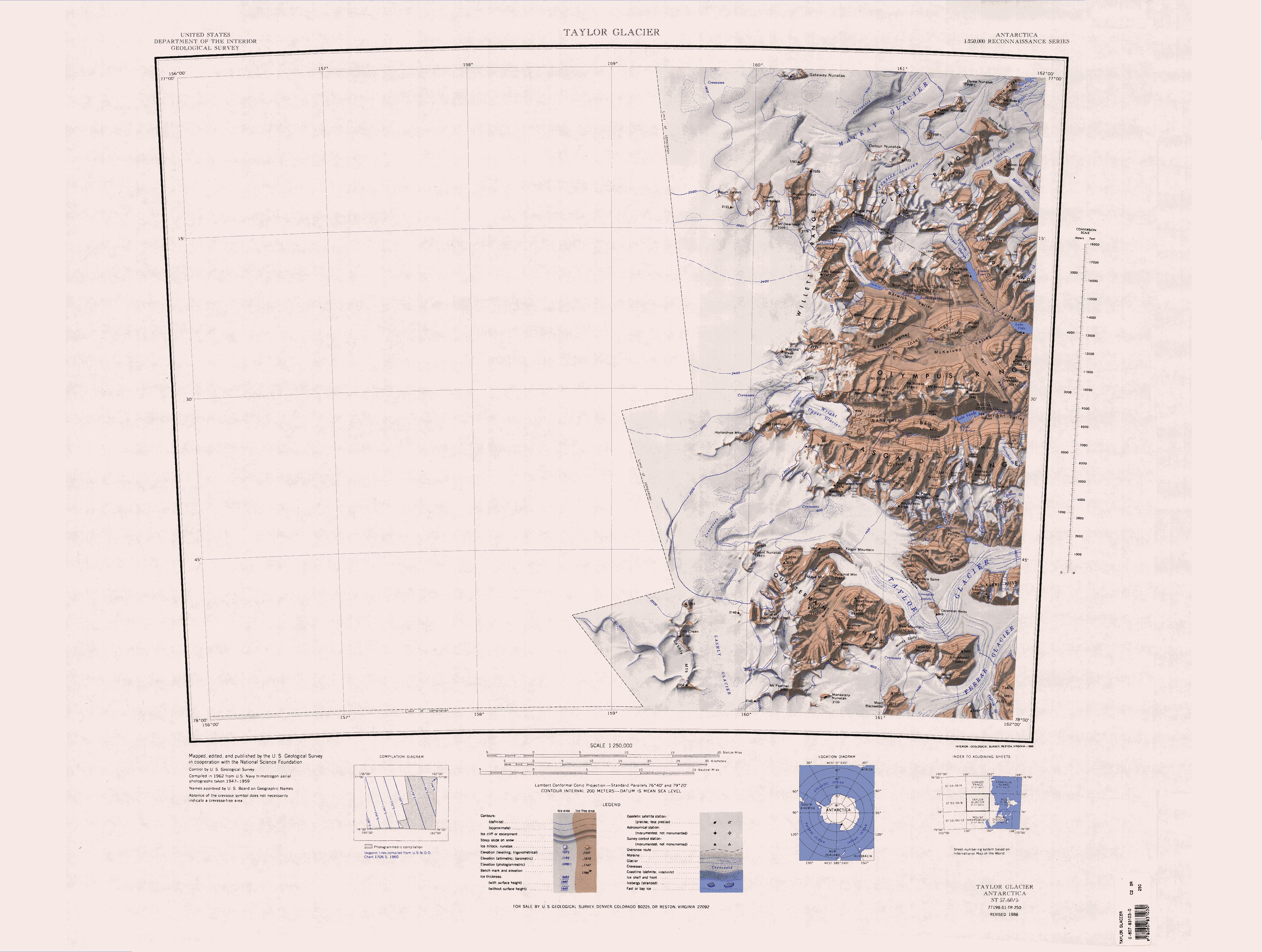
Insel Range north of center of mapped region

The McKelvey Valley is one of the McMurdo Dry Valleys. It runs from the Balham Valley to the west to the Victoria Valley and Lake Vida to the east. The Olympus Range forms the south side of the valley, with several smaller valleys running north from that range into the McKelvey Valley. Bull Pass runs from the east of the valley through the Olympus Range, between Mount Jason and Mount Orestes to Wright Valley. The Insel Range forms its north side.

== Features ==
Features of the McKelvey Valley, from west to east, include:

=== Priscu Valley ===
77.477795°S 160.812009°E. An upland ice-free valley on the east side of Prentice Plateau in the Olympus Range. The valley opens north to the head of McKelvey Valley. Named by US-ACAN (2004) after John C. Priscu, Department of Biological Sciences, Montana State University, Bozeman, MT; United States Antarctic Project (United States ArmyP) investigator in the McMurdo Dry Valleys, 1984-2002.

=== Wall Valley ===
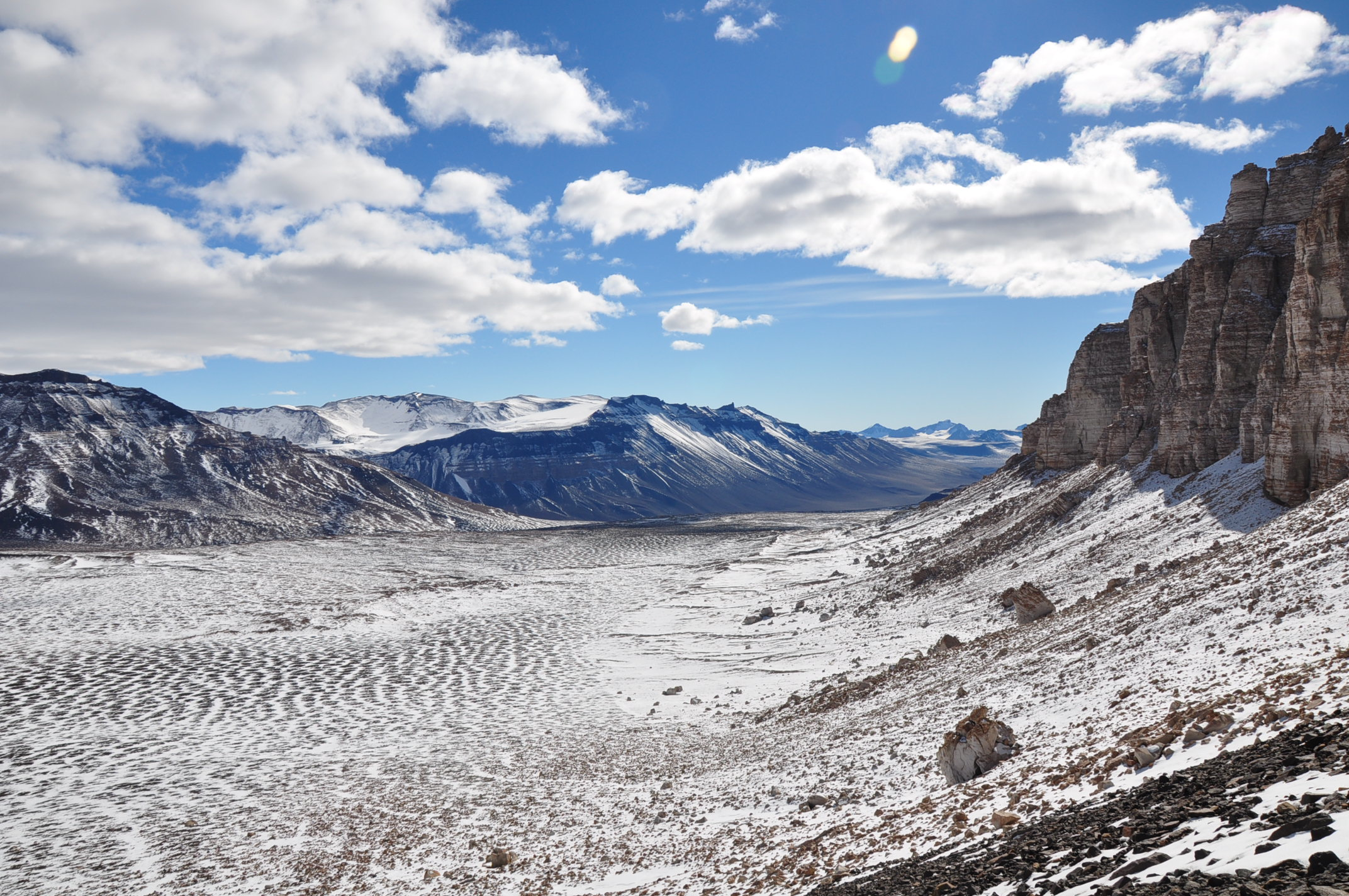
Wall Valley, Antarctica, looking north towards McKelvey Valley

77.487451°S 160.85469°E. An upland valley next east of Priscu Valley in the Olympus Range. Minotaur Pass is at the head between Apollo Peak and Mount Electra. The valley opens north to McKelvey Valley. Named by US-ACAN (2004) after Diana Wall, Natural Resources Ecology Laboratory, Colorado State University, Fort Collins, CO; United States Antarctic Project (United States ArmyP) soils biologist in the McMurdo Dry Valleys, 13 field seasons, 1989-2002.

=== Virginia Valley ===
77.482521°S 160.931866°E. An upland valley east of Wall Valley in the Olympus Range, located between the north part of Mount Electra on the west, and Mount Circe and Mount Dido on the east. The valley opens north to McKelvey Valley. Named by US-ACAN (2004) after Ross A. Virginia, Environmental Studies Program, Dartmouth College, Hanover, NH; United States Antarctic Project (United States ArmyP) soils biologist in the McMurdo Dry Valleys, 13 field seasons, 1989-2002.

=== Kellogg Valley ===
77.490576°S 161.180531°E. A 1,400 metres (4,600 ft) high hanging valley, for the most part free of ice, between Mount Boreas and Mount Aeolus in Olympus Range. The valley opens north to McKelvey Valley, 500 metres (1,600 ft) below. Named by US-ACAN (1997) after husband and wife glacial geologists Thomas B. Kellogg and Davida E. Kellogg, Department of Geological Sciences and Institute of Quaternary Studies, University of Maine, who in several seasons, 1976-90, collaborated in study of the glacial history of the McMurdo Sound region, including field work on the McMurdo Ice Shelf, Ross Ice Shelf, in Ross Sea, and the McMurdo Dry Valleys, the location of this valley.

=== Bratina Valley ===
77.464546°S 161.491225°E. An upland valley at the east side of Harris Ledge in the Olympus Range. The valley opens north to McKelvey Valley. Named by US-ACAN (2004) after Bonnie J. Bratina, Department of Microbiology, Michigan State University, East Lansing, MI; with United States Antarctic Project (United States ArmyP) for four seasons at Lake Vanda in the 1990s.

=== Parish Riegel ===
77.433306°S 161.510497°E. A riegel, or rock bar extending north from Parish Ledge in the Olympus Range, across McKelvey Valley toward the Insel Range. The riegel is 2 nautical miles (3.7 km; 2.3 mi) long, 1 nautical mile (1.9 km; 1.2 mi) wide, and is similar to Bonney Riegel in Taylor Valley. Named by the Advisory Committee on Antarctic Names (US-ACAN) (2004) in association with Parish Ledge (q.v.).

== Sources ==
- Alberts, Fred G., ed. (1995), Geographic Names of the Antarctic (PDF) (2 ed.), United States Board on Geographic Names This article incorporates public domain material from websites or documents of the United States Board on Geographic Names.
- "Bratina Valley", Geographic Names Information System, United States Geological Survey, United States Department of the Interior
- "Kellogg Valley", Geographic Names Information System, United States Geological Survey, United States Department of the Interior
- "Parish Riegel", Geographic Names Information System, United States Geological Survey, United States Department of the Interior
- "Priscu Valley", Geographic Names Information System, United States Geological Survey, United States Department of the Interior
- Taylor Glacier, USGS: United States Geological Survey
- "Virginia Valley", Geographic Names Information System, United States Geological Survey, United States Department of the Interior
- "Wall Valley", Geographic Names Information System, United States Geological Survey, United States Department of the Interior

This article incorporates public domain material from websites or documents of the United States Geological Survey.
