= Olympus Range =

Mountain range in Antarctica

- Location within Antarctica

Geography
- Continent: Antarctica
- Region: Victoria Land
- Range coordinates: 77°29′S 161°30′E

The Olympus Range (77°29′S 161°30′E) is a primarily ice-free mountain range of Victoria Land, Antarctica, with peaks over 2,000 metres (6,600 ft) high, between Victoria Valley and McKelvey Valley on the north and Wright Valley on the south. It is south of the Clare Range and north of the Asgard Range.

== Exploration and naming ==
The Olympus Range was mapped by the Victoria University of Wellington Antarctic Expedition, 1958–59, and named for the Mount Olympus, mythological home of the Greek gods. Peaks in the range are named for figures in Greek mythology.

== Location ==
The Olympus Range extends from the Antarctic Plateau to the Wilson Piedmont Glacier on the west coast of the Ross Sea. The range is bounded by the Balham Valley, McKelvey Valley and Victoria Valley to the north, and the Wright Valley to the south.

== Glaciers ==
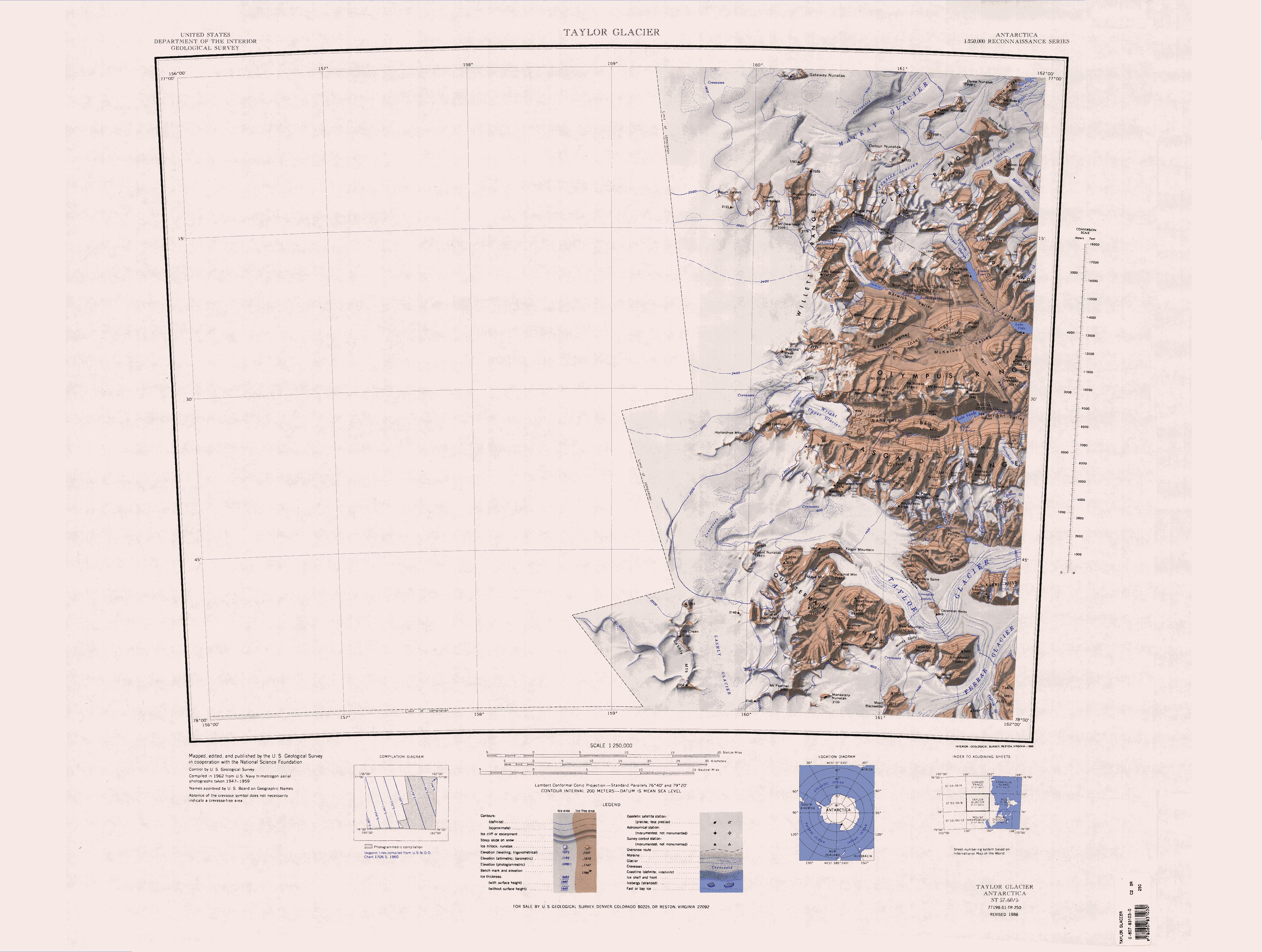
Olympus Range north of center of mapped region

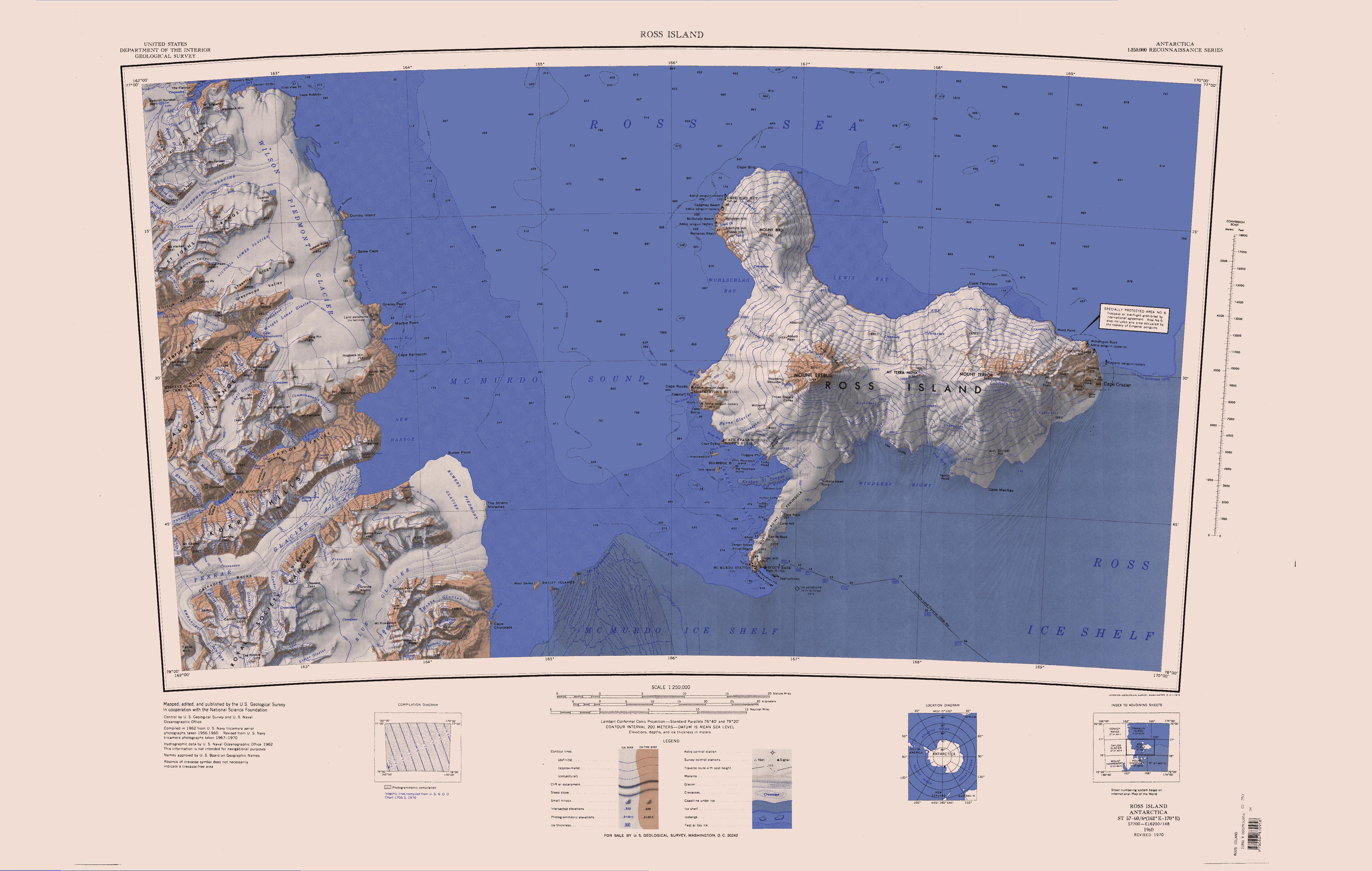
East end of Olympus Range north of center

Glaciers and snowfields include, from west to east, Nakai Snowfield, Orestes Glacier, Cerberus Glacier, Sandy Glacier, Enyo Glacier, Clio Glacier, Eos Glacier, Chinn Glacier and Clark Glacier.

=== Nakai Snowfield ===
77.488399°S 161.526265°E. A snowfield at about 1,600 metres (5,200 ft) elevation that occupies the col between Mount Hercules and Mount Jason. Named by US-ACAN (2004) after Nobuyuki Nakai, Department of Earth Sciences, Nagoya University, Nagoya, Japan; a participant in the McMurdo Dry Valleys Drilling Project, 1973-76.

=== Orestes Glacier ===
77°27′S 161°53′E. A narrow glacier within Orestes Valley, aligned along the valley's north wall. Named after the valley by United States Advisory Committee on Antarctic Names (US-ACAN) in 1997.

=== Cerberus Glacier ===
77°27′S 161°54′E. A glacier, 1 nautical mile (1.9 km; 1.2 mi) long, fringing the south and east lower slopes of otherwise ice-free Mount Cerberus. Named by US-ACAN in 1997 in association with Mount Cerberus.

=== Sandy Glacier ===
77°29′S 161°57′E. A very small glacier 600 metres (2,000 ft) high long and 75 metres (246 ft) high wide) located 0.6 nautical miles (1.1 km; 0.69 mi) east of Mount Orestes. The glacier was studied and named by Wakefield Dort, United States Antarctic Research Program (USARP) geologist with the University of Kansas Expedition (1965-66), who reported that it is composed throughout of interbedded ice and sand layers.

=== Enyo Glacier ===
77.47968°S 162.009964°E. A south-flowing glacier 0.6 nautical miles (1.1 km; 0.69 mi) long situated east of Sandy Glacier in the east part of Olympus Range. Named by New Zealand Geographic Board (NZGB) (1998) after Enyo, a goddess of war.

=== Clio Glacier ===
77.437069°S 162.038845°E. A northeast-flowing glacier, 1 nautical mile (1.9 km; 1.2 mi) long, on the east side of Eurus Ridge. Named by NZGB (1998) after the Greek muse of history.

=== Eos Glacier ===
77.474534°S 162.183488°E. A south-flowing glacier, 0.6 nautical miles (1.1 km; 0.69 mi) long, between Mount Peleus and Mount Theseus in the east part of Olympus Range. Named by NZGB (1998) after the mythological goddess of the dawn.

=== Chinn Glacier ===
77.464743°S 162.247538°E. A glacier 0.7 nautical miles (1.3 km; 0.81 mi) long on the south side of Mount Theseus. A hanging glacier, it terminates on the north wall of Wright Valley. Named by NZGB (1998) after Trevor J. H. Chinn of the Institute of Geological and Nuclear Sciences Limited, Christchurch, New Zealand, a glaciologist in McMurdo Dry Valleys for several seasons in the period 1974-93.

== Western features ==
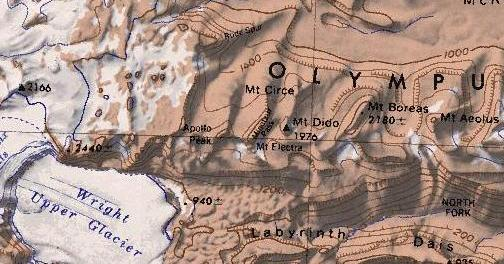
West part of the Olympus Range. 1962 USGS map showing the larger peaks. More features have been named since then.

Features to the north of Wright Upper Glacier and the Labyrinth, extending east to Mount Boreas and Mount Thrace, include (from west to east) Hawkins Cirque, Prentice Plateau, Mount Cassidy, Pentecost Cirque, Dean Cirque, Apollo Peak, Dipboye Cirque, Mount Electra, Leibert Cirque, Mount Dido, Mount Circe, Stuiver Valley, Mount Boreas and Mount Thrace.

=== Hawkins Cirque ===
77.508923°S 160.586736°E. A cirque about 0.5 nautical miles (0.93 km; 0.58 mi) wide, in part occupied by a glacier, near the center of the south cliffs of Prentice Plateau, Olympus Range. The cirque opens south to Wright Upper Glacier. Named by US-ACAN (2004) after Jack D. Hawkins, lead PHI helicopter pilot with USAP in eight consecutive field seasons from 1996-97.

=== Prentice Plateau ===
77.47747°S 160.630372°E. A nearly rectangular plateau of about 9 square nautical miles (31 km^{2}; 12 sq mi) at the north side of Wright Upper Glacier (Note: The United States Geological Survey (USGS) entry for Prentice Plateau says it is at the north side of Victoria Upper Glacier, some distance away. It should read Wright Upper Glacier.) and west of Apollo Peak. The upper surface about 1,850 metres (6,070 ft) high is ice covered except for scoured outcrops. Named by US-ACAN (2004) after Michael L. Prentice, Department of Earth Sciences, University of New Hampshire, Durham, NH; in USAP for 15 years from about 1983 including work in McMurdo Dry Valleys.

=== Mount Cassidy ===
77.455773°S 160.795539°E. A mountain 1,917 metres (6,289 ft) high which forms a salient angle in the northeast part of Prentice Plateau. Rude Spur descends from the east side of the mountain. Named by US-ACAN (2004) after Dennis S. Cassidy, Curator of the Antarctic Marine Geology Research Facility and Core Library, Florida State University, Tallahassee, from 1962-1991.

=== Pentecost Cirque ===
77.506463°S 160.687231°E. A cirque between Hawkins Cirque and Dean Cirque on the south side of Olympus Range. The cirque opens south to Wright Upper Glacier. Named by US-ACAN (2004) after John S. Pentecost, PHI helicopter pilot with USAP in seven consecutive field seasons from 1997-98.

=== Dean Cirque ===
77.505551°S 160.753169°E. A cirque between the southeast part of Prentice Plateau and Apollo Peak. The cirque opens south to the Labyrinth. Named by US-ACAN (2004) after Christopher T. Dean, PHI helicopter pilot with United States Antarctic Project (USAP) in eight consecutive field seasons from 1996-97.

=== Apollo Peak ===
77°30′S 160°48′E. A dolerite capped peak rising to 1,900 metres (6,200 ft) high west of Mount Electra. The peak was named by the NZ-APC in 1984 after work carried out by the NZARP. Named after the god Apollo, in association with other names from Greek mythology in this range.

=== Dipboye Cirque ===
77.503618°S 160.833629°E. A cirque on the south side of Olympus Range between Apollo Peak and Mount Electra. The cirque opens south to the Labyrinth. Named by US-ACAN (2004) after Richard L. Dipboye, PHI helicopter pilot with USAP in eight consecutive field seasons from 1996-97.

=== Mount Electra ===
77°30′S 160°52′E. Prominent peak, over 2,000 metres (6,600 ft) high, immediately west of Mount Dido. Named by the VUWAE (1958-59) for a figure in Greek mythology.

=== Leibert Cirque ===
77.5°S 160.916667°E. A cirque between Mount Electra and Mount Dido on the south side of Olympus Range. The cirque opens south to The Labyrinth. Named by US-ACAN (2004) after Gregg Leibert, PHI helicopter pilot with USAP in seven consecutive field seasons from 1996-97.

=== Mount Dido ===
77°29′S 160°57′E. Prominent peak, 2,070 metres (6,790 ft) high, between Mounts Electra and Boreas. Named by the VUWAE (1958-59) for a figure in Greek mythology.

=== Mount Circe ===
77°28′S 160°58′E. Prominent peak over 2,000 metres (6,600 ft) high, standing just north of Mount Dido. Named by the VUWAE (1958-59) after a figure in Greek mythology.

=== Stuiver Valley ===
77.481946°S 161.028341°E. A 1,400 metres (4,600 ft) high hanging valley, largely ice free, between Mount Circe and Mount Dido on the west and Mount Boreas on the east. Named by US-ACAN in 1997 after Minze Stuiver, geochemist, Quaternary Research Center, University of Washington, Quaternary specialist in dating Antarctic samples with United States Antarctic Research Program (USARP) from 1969 to the time of naming; authority on the glacial history of the McMurdo Sound region and McMurdo Dry Valleys, the location of this valley (not completed).

=== Mount Boreas ===
77°29′S 161°06′E. Prominent peak, 2,180 metres (7,150 ft) high, between Mounts Aeolus and Dido. Named by the VUWAE (1958-59) for a figure in Greek mythology.

=== Mount Thrace ===
77.499868°S 161.12272°E. A peak rising to 1,800 metres (5,900 ft) high at the southeast side of Mount Boreas. The peak is connected by a ridge to the Mount Boreas massif. Named by US-ACAN (2004) after Thrace, legendary home of Boreas.

== Central features ==
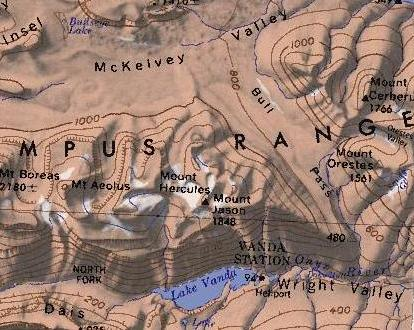
Central part of the Olympus Range

Central features, extending from Mount Aeolus east to the Bull Pass, include (from west to east), Mount Aeolus, Cartwright Valley, Fritsen Valley, Harris Ledge, Mount Hercules, Parish Ledge, Mount Jason, Goldich Crest and Gonzales Spur.

=== Mount Aeolus ===
77°29′S 161°16′E. Prominent peak, over 2,000 metres (6,600 ft) high, between Mounts Boreas and Hercules. Named by the VUWAE (1958-59) for the Greek god of the winds.

=== Cartwright Valley ===
77.478076°S 161.346905°E. A hanging valley that is for the most part free of ice, lying east of Mount Aeolus. Named by US-ACAN (1997) after Keros Cartwright, Illinois State Geological Survey, who made hydrogeological studies with Henry Harris (Harris Ledge) in Victoria Valley, Wright Valley, and Taylor Valley during the Dry Valley Drilling Project; 1973-74, 1974-75, and 1975-76 seasons.

=== Fritsen Valley ===
77.472076°S 161.410361°E. An upland valley to the north of the Mount Hercules summit area and west of Harris Ledge. Named by US-ACAN (2004) after Christian H. Fritsen, microbiologist, Division of Earth and Ecosystem Sciences, Desert Research Institute, Reno, NV; USAP investigator of pack ice and lake ice from about 1992.

=== Harris Ledge ===
77.474587°S 161.439794°E. A flat, ice-free ridge to the north of Mount Hercules. Named by US-ACAN (1997) after Henry Harris, Illinois State Geological Survey, who made hydrogeological studies with Keros Cartwright (Cartwright Valley) in Victoria Valley, Wright Valley, and Taylor Valley during the Dry Valley Drilling Project; 1973-74, 1974-75, and 1975-76 seasons.

=== Mount Hercules ===
77°29′S 161°27′E. Large, flat-topped, elevated feature between Mounts Aeolus and Jason. Named by the VUWAE (1958-59) for a figure in Greek mythology.

=== Parish Ledge ===
77.474757°S 161.535191°E. A flat-topped ridge 1,642 metres (5,387 ft) high on the east side of Bratina Valley. Named by US-ACAN (2004) after Thomas R. Parish, Department of Atmospheric Science, University of Wyoming, Laramie, WY, long-term USAP investigator of Antarctic katabatic winds, 1981-97.

=== Mount Jason ===
77°29′S 161°37′E. Peak just west of Bull Pass. Named by the VUWAE (1958-59) for a figure in Greek mythology.

=== Goldich Crest ===
77.491252°S 161.674007°E. A peak, 1,700 metres (5,600 ft) high, between Mount Jason and Bull Pass. Gonzalez Spur extends east-southeast from the peak. Named by US-ACAN (2004) after S.S. (Sam) Goldich, Department of Geology, Northern Illinois University, DeKalb, IL (later United States Geological Survey, Denver, CO); a participant in the McMurdo Dry Valleys Drilling Project, 1973-76.

=== Gonzalez Spur ===
77.503193°S 161.797871°E. A prominent rock spur 2.5 nautical miles (4.6 km; 2.9 mi) long that extends east-southeast from 1,700 metres (5,600 ft) Goldich Crest. The spur descends to 500 metres (1,600 ft) high at the east extremity where it overhangs Wright Valley and forms the west side of the south entrance to higher Bull Pass. Named by US-ACAN (2004) after Angel Gonzalez, Manager, United States Antarctic Resource Center, United States Geological Survey, 1996-2004.

== Eastern features ==
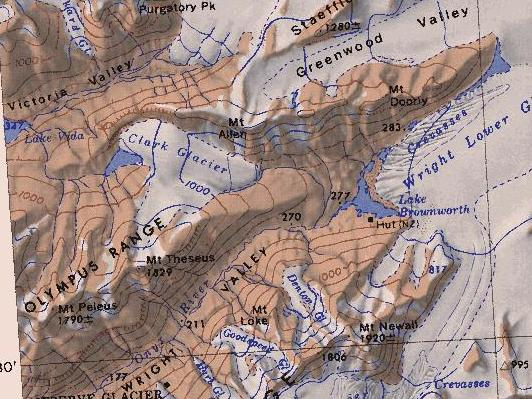
Eastern Olympus Range. 1962 USGS map showing the larger peaks. More features have been named since then.

Eastern features, to the east of Bull Pass, include (from west to east), Mount Booth, Mount Cerebus, Orestes Valley, Mount Orestes, Wrenn Peak, Jones Terrace, Mount Peleus, Eurus Ridge, Baumann Valley, Nottage Ridge, Sanford Valley, McClelland Ridge, Poseidon Pond, Thomas Valley, Artemis Ridge, Mount Theseus, Mount Helios, Helios Ridge, Mount Allen and Mount Doorly.

=== Mount Booth ===
77.431432°S 161.7632221575°E. A peak 1,575 metres (5,167 ft) high surmounting the junction of mountain ridges at the southwest end of Murphy Valley. Named by US-ACAN (2004) after John F. (Johan) Booth, science technician who wintered eight times at the USAP Palmer Station and South Pole Station between 1994 and 2004.

=== Mount Cerberus ===
77°26′S 161°53′E. Prominent peak over 1,600 metres (5,200 ft) high, with many side peaks, between Lake Vida and Mount Orestes. Named by the VUWAE (1958-59) after Cerberus, a three-headed dog of Greek mythology.

=== Orestes Valley ===
77°28′S 161°55′E. A small ice-free valley at the north side of Mount Orestes. Named in 1964 for its association with Mount Orestes by American geologist Parker E. Calkin.

=== Mount Orestes ===
77°28′S 161°55′E. Prominent peak, over 1,600 metres (5,200 ft) high, just east of Bull Pass. Named by the VUWAE (1958-59) for a figure in Greek mythology.

=== Wrenn Peak ===
77.470568°S 161.994089°E. A peak rising to 1,750 metres (5,740 ft) high on the ridge at the head of Sandy Glacier and Enyo Glacier. Named by US-ACAN (2004) after John H. Wrenn, Department of Geology, Northern Illinois University, DeKalb, IL, a participant in the McMurdo Dry Valleys Drilling Project, 1973-74.

=== Jones Terrace ===
77.497584°S 162.073715°E. A prominent ice free terrace south of Mount Peleus, at the south end of the east segment of Olympus Range. The terrace rises 800 metres (2,600 ft) high from the floor of central Wright Valley to a summit of over 1,000 metres (3,300 ft). Named by US-ACAN (1997) after Lois M. Jones, geologist, University of Georgia, leader of a 1969-1970 research party in McMurdo Dry Valleys.

=== Mount Peleus ===
77°29′S 162°05′E. Small peak, 1,790 metres (5,870 ft) high, about 3 nautical miles (5.6 km; 3.5 mi) west of Mount Theseus. Named by the VUWAE (1958-59) for a figure in Greek mythology.

=== Eurus Ridge ===
77.438451°S 161.986636°E. A ridge between Cerberus Valley and Clio Glacier. Named by NZGB (1998) after the mythological god of the east wind.

=== Baumann Valley ===
77.449427°S 162.074596°E. A valley at the west side of Nottage Ridge in the east part of Olympus Range. Named by US-ACAN (1997) after Clinton L. Baumann, electronic technician, Applied Physics Laboratory, Johns Hopkins University, who was a member of the 1971-72 United States Geological Survey (USGS) field party that established a network of horizontal and vertical control in support of compilation of topographic maps at 1:50,000 scale, of areas of McMurdo Dry Valleys.

=== Nottage Ridge ===
77.458822°S 162.09705°E. A ridge to the north of Mount Peleus that separates Baumann Valley and Sanford Valley in the east part of Olympus Range. Named by US-ACAN (1997) after George W. (Billy) Nottage, topographic engineer, a member of the 1971-72 United States Geological Survey (USGS) field party that established a network of horizontal and vertical control in support of compilation of topographic maps at the scale of 1:50,000 of areas of McMurdo Dry Valleys bounded by 160| and 164|E and 77|15' and 77|45'S.

=== Sanford Valley ===
77.449302°S 162.140369°E. A valley that trends north–south between Nottage Ridge and McClelland Ridge in the east part of Olympus Range. Named by US-ACAN (1997) after Leroy L. Sanford, topographic engineer, a member of the 1971-72 United States Geological Survey (USGS) field party that established a network of horizontal and vertical control for compilation of eight 1:50,000 scale maps of an area of McMurdo Dry Valleys.

=== McClelland Ridge ===
77.452688°S 162.161797°E. A high rock ridge between Sanford Valley and Thomas Valley in the east part of Olympus Range. Named by US-ACAN (1997) after Elias E. McClelland, topographic engineer, leader of the 1971-72 United States Geological Survey (USGS) field party that established a network of horizontal and vertical control over a 6,000 square kilometer area of McMurdo Dry Valleys to support compilation of eight topographic maps at 1:50,000 scale. These maps, bounded by 160| and 164|E and 77|15' and 77|45|S|were published by United States Geological Survey (USGS) in 1977.

=== Poseidon Pond ===
77.455289°S 162.194613°E. A pond 0.2 nautical miles (0.37 km; 0.23 mi) long lying in Thomas Valley in eastern Olympus Range. Named by NZGB (1998) after Poseidon, god of the sea, whose mythological home was Mount Olympus.

=== Thomas Valley ===
77.451631°S 162.198339°E. A valley at the east side of McClelland Ridge in the east part of Olympus Range. Named by US-ACAN (1997) after Jean-Claude Thomas, Associate Professor of Geography-Cartography, Catholic University of America, 1967-76, George Mason University, 1976-85; United States Geological Survey (USGS) Cartographer from 1985, specializing in satellite image mapping at various scales, including the 1:25,000-scale color maps of McMurdo Dry Valleys, 1997.

=== Artemis Ridge ===
77.448894°S 162.242433°E. A ridge, 1 mile long, rising to 1700 meters. between Thomas Valley and the southwest part of Clark Glacier. Named by NZGB (1998) after a goddess associated with the moon.

=== Mount Theseus ===
77°27′S 162°16′E. Prominent peak, 1,830 metres (6,000 ft) high, just south of Clark Glacier. Named by the VUWAE (1958-59) after a figure of Greek mythology.

=== Mount Helios ===
77.447819°S 162.32695°E. A peak 0.8 nautical miles (1.5 km; 0.92 mi) northeast of Mount Theseus, rising to 1,650 metres (5,410 ft) high in the east part of Olympus Range. Named by US-ACAN (1997) after Helios, the sun god.

=== Helios Ridge ===
77.439896°S 162.469388°E. A broad rock ridge, 4.5 nautical miles (8.3 km; 5.2 mi) long, that extends in an east-northeast direction from Mount Helios, Olympus Range, to the vicinity of Lake Brownworth in Wright Valley. The ridge rises between the east snout of Clark Glacier and Wright Valley, causing meltwater streams to flow east around it to reach Onyx River. Named by US-ACAN (1997) in association with Mount Helios.

=== Mount Allen ===
77°24′S 162°32′E. Peak, 1,400 metres (4,600 ft) high, standing between Clark Glacier and the head of Greenwood Valley. Charted by the VUWAE, 1959-60, and named for A.D. Allen, one of the party's geologists.

=== Mount Doorly ===
77°23′S 162°54′E. A summit surmounting the east part of the rocky ridge between Greenwood Valley and Wright Lower Glacier. Discovered by the BrNAE, 1901-04, under Scott, and named after Lieutenant Gerald S. Doorly, RN, of the Morning, relief ship to the expedition.

== Sources ==
- Alberts, Fred G., ed. (1995), Geographic Names of the Antarctic (PDF) (2 ed.), United States Board on Geographic Names This article incorporates public domain material from websites or documents of the United States Board on Geographic Names.
- Ross Island, USGS: United States Geological Survey
- Taylor Glacier, USGS: United States Geological Survey
- "Artemis Ridge", Geographic Names Information System, United States Geological Survey, United States Department of the Interior
- "Baumann Valley", Geographic Names Information System, United States Geological Survey, United States Department of the Interior
- "Cartwright Valley", Geographic Names Information System, United States Geological Survey, United States Department of the Interior
- "Dean Cirque", Geographic Names Information System, United States Geological Survey, United States Department of the Interior
- "Dipboye Cirque", Geographic Names Information System, United States Geological Survey, United States Department of the Interior
- "Eurus Ridge", Geographic Names Information System, United States Geological Survey, United States Department of the Interior
- "Fritsen Valley", Geographic Names Information System, United States Geological Survey, United States Department of the Interior
- "Goldich Crest", Geographic Names Information System, United States Geological Survey, United States Department of the Interior
- "Gonzalez Spur", Geographic Names Information System, United States Geological Survey, United States Department of the Interior
- "Harris Ledge", Geographic Names Information System, United States Geological Survey, United States Department of the Interior
- "Hawkins Cirque", Geographic Names Information System, United States Geological Survey, United States Department of the Interior
- "Helios Ridge", Geographic Names Information System, United States Geological Survey, United States Department of the Interior
- "Jones Terrace", Geographic Names Information System, United States Geological Survey, United States Department of the Interior
- "Leibert Cirque", Geographic Names Information System, United States Geological Survey, United States Department of the Interior
- "McClelland Ridge", Geographic Names Information System, United States Geological Survey, United States Department of the Interior
- "Mount Booth", Geographic Names Information System, United States Geological Survey, United States Department of the Interior
- "Mount Cassidy", Geographic Names Information System, United States Geological Survey, United States Department of the Interior
- "Mount Helios", Geographic Names Information System, United States Geological Survey, United States Department of the Interior
- "Mount Thrace", Geographic Names Information System, United States Geological Survey, United States Department of the Interior
- "Nakai Snowfield", Geographic Names Information System, United States Geological Survey, United States Department of the Interior
- "Nottage Ridge", Geographic Names Information System, United States Geological Survey, United States Department of the Interior
- "Parish Ledge", Geographic Names Information System, United States Geological Survey, United States Department of the Interior
- "Pentecost Cirque", Geographic Names Information System, United States Geological Survey, United States Department of the Interior
- "Poseidon Pond", Geographic Names Information System, United States Geological Survey, United States Department of the Interior
- "Prentice Plateau", Geographic Names Information System, United States Geological Survey, United States Department of the Interior
- "Sanford Valley", Geographic Names Information System, United States Geological Survey, United States Department of the Interior
- "Stuiver Valley", Geographic Names Information System, United States Geological Survey, United States Department of the Interior
- "Thomas Valley", Geographic Names Information System, United States Geological Survey, United States Department of the Interior
- "Wrenn Peak", Geographic Names Information System, United States Geological Survey, United States Department of the Interior
- Cerberus Glacier, AADC: Australian Antarctic Data Centre
- "Chinn Glacier", Geographic Names Information System, United States Geological Survey, United States Department of the Interior
- "Clio Glacier", Geographic Names Information System, United States Geological Survey, United States Department of the Interior
- "Enyo Glacier", Geographic Names Information System, United States Geological Survey, United States Department of the Interior
- "Eos Glacier", Geographic Names Information System, United States Geological Survey, United States Department of the Interior
- Orestes Glacier, AADC: Australian Antarctic Data Centre

This article incorporates public domain material from websites or documents of the United States Geological Survey.
