= Mount Odin (Victoria Land) =

Mountain in Ross Dependency, Antarctica

- Location within Antarctica

Geography
- Continent: Antarctica
- Region: Victoria Land
- Range coordinates: 77°34′53″S 161°37′11″E

Mount Odin (77°34′53″S 161°37′11″E) is the most prominent peak, though not the highest, in the Asgard Range, of Victoria Land, Antarctica. It rises over 2,000 m (6,600 ft) just south of Lake Vanda. It was named by the Victoria University of Wellington Antarctic Expedition (VUWAE) (1958–59) for the Norse god Odin.

== Location ==
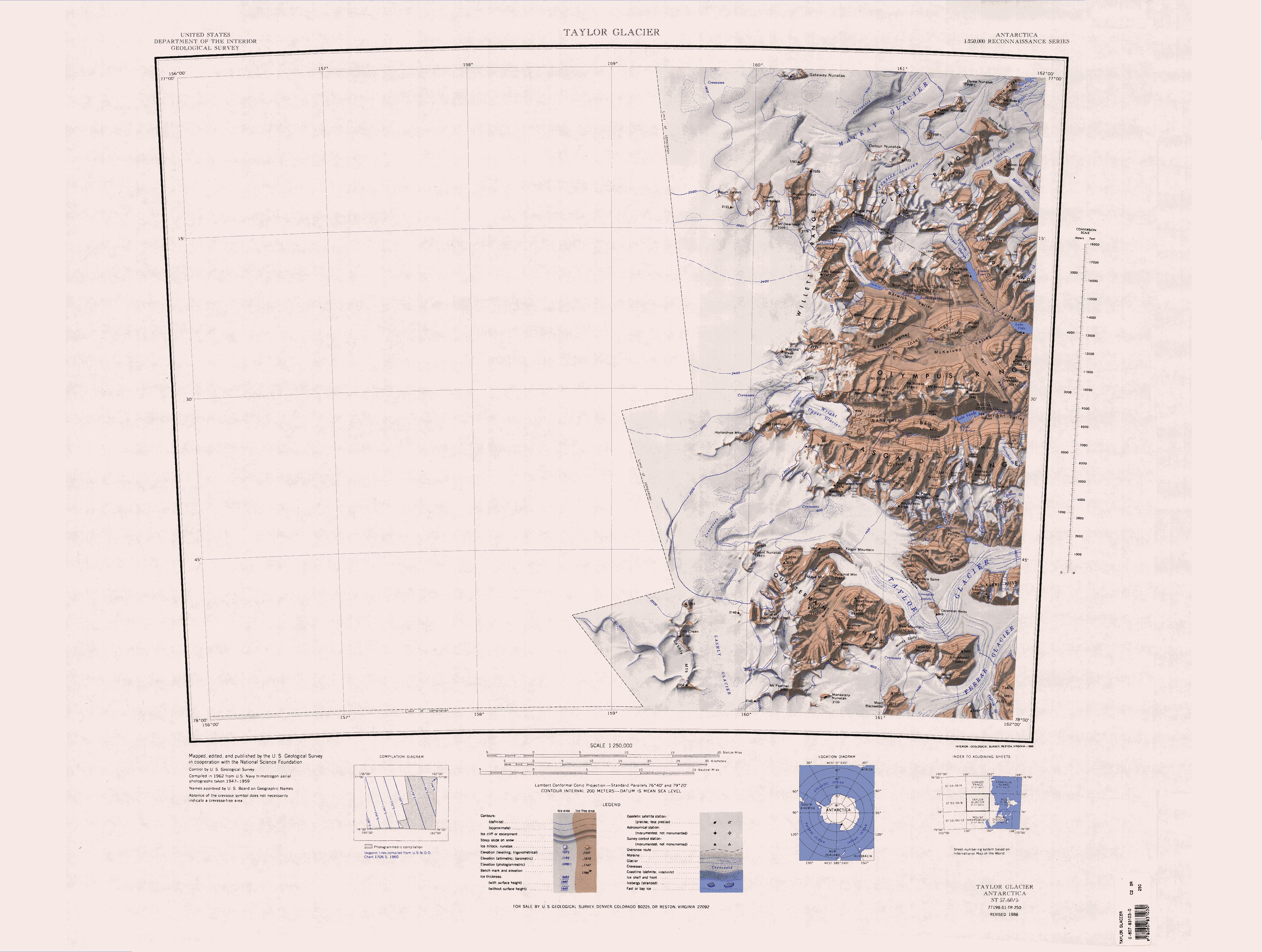
Asgard Range south of center of mapped region, Mount Odin towards the east

Mount Odin lies to the south of Lake Vanda in the Wright Valley. The Odin Valley is to its east, and Obelisk Mountain to its south. Junction Knob is to the southwest.

A study of soil microbiology from sites in the Odin valley down to the Onyx River in the Wright Valley, published in 1972, showed that despite the cold and dry conditions, there was active in-situ microbial life in all the soils examined.

== Features ==
Features in the region around the mountain include Odin Valley, Tiw Valley, Mime Glacier, Siegfried Peak, Siegmund Peak, Heimdall Glacier, Mount Beowulf, Beowulf Glacier,, Mount Valhalla, Valhalla Glacier, Obelisk Mountain, Hind Turret, Junction Knob, Odin Glacier, Alberich Glacier, Sykes Glacier, Donner Valley and Odin Glacier.

=== Odin Valley ===
77°36′S 161°43′E. An ice free valley immediately east of Mount Odin. Named by New Zealand Antarctic Place-Names Committee (NZ-APC) in association with Mount Odin.

=== Tiw Valley ===
77°36′S 161°47′E. A valley lying next eastward of Odin Valley. The feature is one in a group in this range named from Norse mythology, Tiw being the god of rules and regulations in war and peace. The name was suggested by United States Advisory Committee on Antarctic Names (US-ACAN) in consultation with the NZ-APC.

=== Mime Glacier ===
77°37′S 161°45′E. A small glacier at the south (upper) end of Tiw Valley. The name is one in a group given by NZ-APC from Norse mythology. In Der Ring des Nibelungen, Mime is the smith who aids Siegfried to win the ring and is slain by the hero for his treachery.

=== Siegfried Peak ===
77°34′S 161°46′E. Peak that forms a saddle with Siegmund Peak immediately southward, standing at the east side of the entrance to Odin Valley in the Asgard Range. The peak is one in a group of features in the area named mainly from Norse mythology by NZ-APC. Siegfried was the hero of various German legends, particularly of the Nibelungenlied.

=== Siegmund Peak ===
77°35′S 161°46′E. The peak forms a saddle with Siegfried Peak just northward, located at the east side of the entrance to Odin Valley. The name was applied by NZ-APC after Siegmund, the father of the German legend hero Siegfried in Der Ring des Nibelungen.

=== Mount Beowulf ===
77°38′S 161°48′E. A peak rising to about 2,100 metres (6,900 ft) high at the southeast side of Mime Glacier. Mapped by the United States Geological Survey (USGS) in 1962 from United States Navy aerial photographs taken 1947-59. Named by the NZ-APC in 1983 after the hero of the Old English epic poem.

=== Beowulf Glacier ===
77°38′S 161°49′E. A small north-flowing glacier located between Mime Glacier and the head of Rhone Glacier in the Asgard Range. Named in 1983 by the NZ-APC from association with Mount Beowulf which stands at the head of this glacier.

=== Mount Valhalla ===
77°35′S 161°56′E. A peak standing at the west flank of Valhalla Glacier from where it overlooks the south side of Wright Valley. The name is one in a group in the range derived from Norse mythology, Valhalla being the great hall where Odin receives and feasts the souls of heroes who have fallen bravely in battle. The name was suggested by US-ACAN in consultation with NZ-APC.

=== Obelisk Mountain ===
77°37′S 161°37′E. A mountain, about 2,200 metres (7,200 ft) high, between Catspaw Glacier and Mount Odin. Given this descriptive name by the Western Journey Party, led by Taylor, of the BrAE, 1910-13.

=== Hind Turret ===
77°38′S 161°37′E. A descriptive name that is suggestive of the appearance and position of this peak at the south (hind) side of Obelisk Mountain. The name was recommended by the US-ACAN in consultation with the NZ-APC.

=== Veli Peak ===
77°39′S 161°28′E. A peak just east of Idun Peak and 1 nautical mile (1.9 km; 1.2 mi) south of Brunhilde Peak. The precise origin of "Veli," applied by NZ-APC, is not known.

=== Brunhilde Peak ===
77°38′S 161°27′E. A rock peak between the upper part of Donner Valley and Sykes Glacier. Named by NZ-APC after Brunhilde, one in a group of names in the range derived from Norse mythology. In the Nibelungenlied, Brunhilde is a young and stalwart queen whom Siegfried, by magic, wins and later tames for Gunther.

=== Idun Peak ===
77°38′S 161°26′E. A small peak between Mount Thundergut and Veli Peak. The name, recommended by US-ACAN in consultation with NZAPC, is one in a group of names in Asgard Range derived from Norse mythology Idun being a goddess.

=== Colosseum Cliff ===
77°36′S 161°27′E. An impressive banded cliff located between Sykes Glacier and the doleritic rock of Plane Table. The descriptive name was applied by the NZ-APC.

=== Junction Knob ===
77°36′S 161°39′E. A descriptive name given by the NZ-APC to a small but distinctive peak at the junction of Odin Glacier and Alberich Glacier névé areas.

=== Odin Glacier ===
77°35′S 161°36′E. A small glacier that drains the west slopes of Mount Odin. Named by NZ-APC in association with Mount Odin.

=== Alberich Glacier ===
77°36′S 161°36′E. A small glacier that drains west from Junction Knob toward the east flank of Sykes Glacier. It is one in a group of features in the range named by NZ-APC mainly from Norse mythology. In German legend, Alberich is the all-powerful king of the dwarfs and chief of the Nibelungen.

== Sources ==
- Alberts, Fred G., ed. (1995), Geographic Names of the Antarctic (PDF) (2 ed.), United States Board on Geographic Names This article incorporates public domain material from websites or documents of the United States Board on Geographic Names.
- Taylor Glacier, USGS: United States Geological Survey
- Vishniac, Wolf V.; Mainzer, Stanley E. (1972), "Soil microbiology studied in situ in the dry valleys of Antarctica" (PDF), Antarctic Journal

This article incorporates public domain material from websites or documents of the United States Geological Survey.
