= Kennedy Glacier =

Kennedy Glacier may mean:

- Kennedy Glacier (Antarctica), a glacier in Antarctica
- Kennedy Glacier (Washington), a glacier on Glacier Peak, Washington, USA
