= Don Juan Pond =

Shallow salt lake in Antarctica

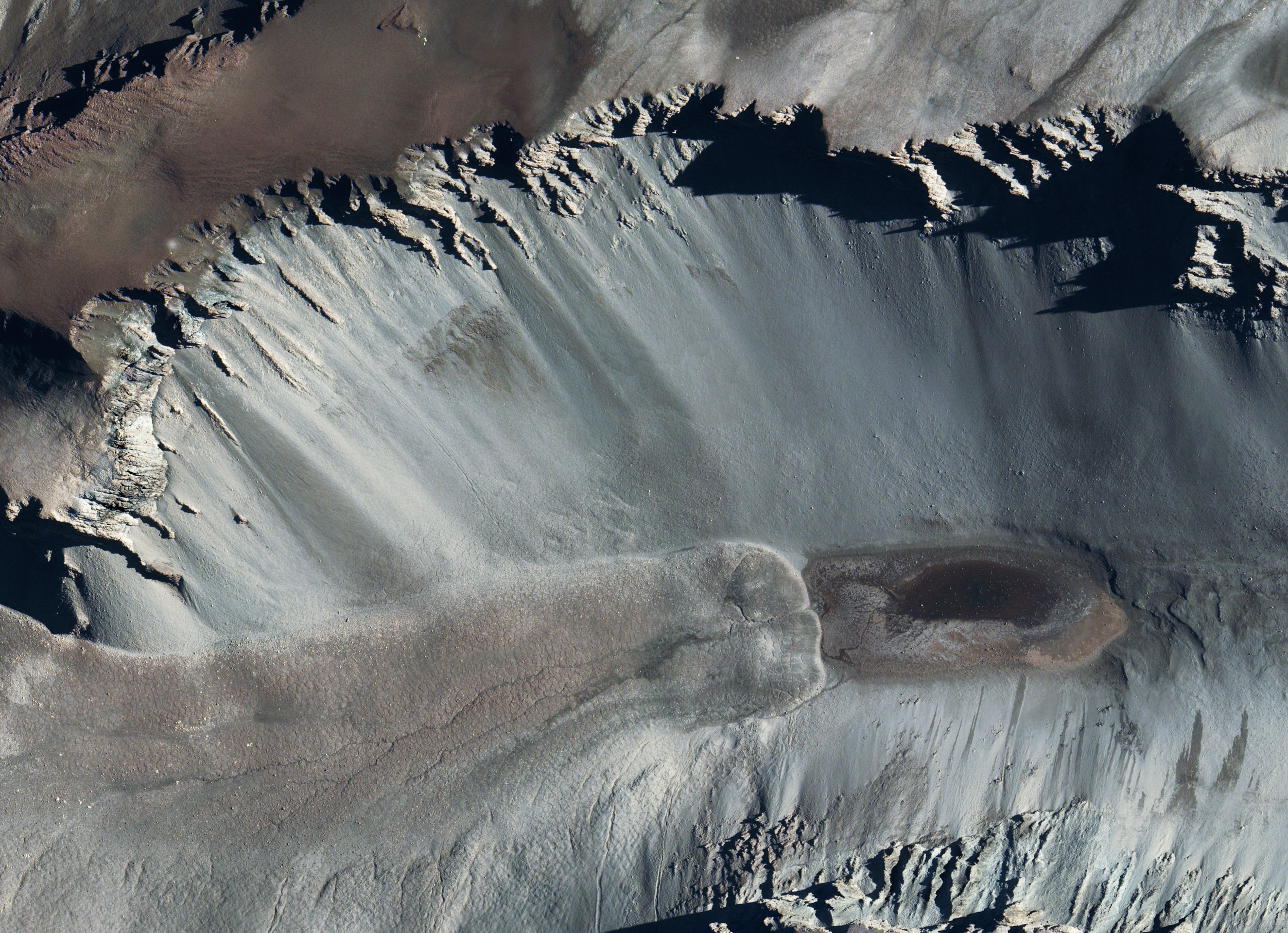
- Satellite image

- Location within Antarctica
- Location: East Antarctica
- Coordinates: 77°33′52″S 161°10′20″E
- Type: Hypersaline lake
- Basin countries: (Antarctica)
- Max. length: 300 m (980 ft)
- Max. width: 100 m (330 ft)
- Surface area: 0.03 km^{2} (0.012 sq mi)
- Average depth: 30 in (760 mm)
- Max. depth: 7 ft (2.1 m)
- Water volume: 3,000 m^{3} (110,000 cu ft)
- Surface elevation: 116 m (381 ft)
- Frozen: No
- Islands: 0
- Settlements: Vanda Station (14 km to the east)

Don Juan Pond is a small and very shallow hypersaline lake in the western end of Wright Valley (South Fork), Victoria Land, Antarctica, 9 kilometres (5.6 mi) west from Lake Vanda. It is wedged between the Asgard Range to the south and the Dais Range to the north. On the west end is a small tributary and a rock glacier.

With a salinity level of 45.8%, Don Juan Pond is the saltiest of the Antarctic lakes. This salinity causes significant freezing-point depression, allowing the pond to remain liquid even at temperatures as low as −50 °C (−58 °F).

Don Juan Pond was discovered in 1961. It was named for two helicopter pilots, Lt. Don Roe and Lt. John Hickey, who piloted the helicopter involved with the first field party investigating the pond.

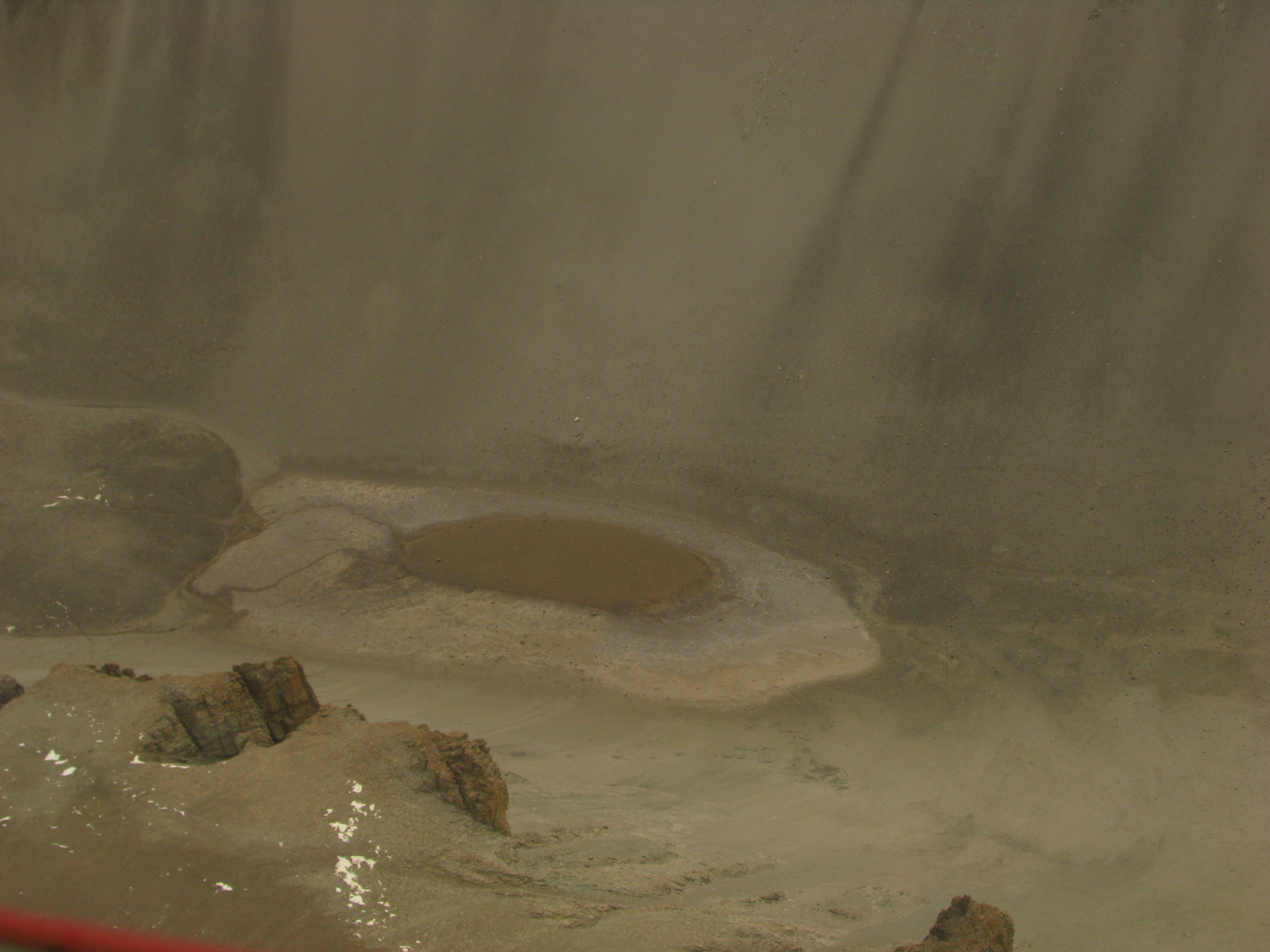
Don Juan Pond seen from the air

== Salinity ==
Don Juan Pond is a shallow, flat-bottom, hyper-saline pond. It has the second-highest total dissolved solids on record, 30% greater salinity than the Dead Sea. Salinity varies over time from 200 to 474 g/L, dominated by calcium chloride. It is the only Antarctic hypersaline lake that almost never freezes. The area around Don Juan Pond is covered with sodium chloride and calcium chloride salts that have precipitated as the water evaporated.

The area and volume of Don Juan Pond vary over time. According to the United States Geological Survey topographical map published in 1977, the area was approximately 0.25 km^{2} (62 acres). However, in recent years the pond has shrunk considerably. The maximum depth in 1993–1994 was described as "a foot deep" (30 cm). In January 1997, it was approximately 10 centimetres (3.9 in) deep; in December 1998, the pond was almost dry everywhere except for an area of a few tens of square metres. Most of the remaining water was in depressions around large boulders in the pond.

== Origin of Water and Salts ==
The extreme salinity of Don Juan Pond (DJP) has been the subject of extensive research, with multiple competing or complementary mechanisms proposed regarding the sources of its water and high salt content.

=== Water ===
One prominent hypothesis suggests that DJP is primarily fed by near-surface processes. Studies have observed that calcium chloride-rich brines form through the deliquescence of hygroscopic salts in the surrounding soils, absorbing atmospheric moisture. These brines then flow downslope along shallow subsurface pathways, known as water tracks, into the pond. This mechanism is supported by time-lapse imagery and soil moisture measurements indicating active brine transport during warmer periods.

Alternatively, other research points to a deep groundwater source as the primary contributor to DJP's salinity. Geochemical analyses and modeling have demonstrated that the pond's unique calcium chloride-dominated composition is consistent with upwelling from a regional deep groundwater system. This groundwater is believed to interact with subsurface minerals, enriching the water with calcium chloride before it reaches the pond.

=== Salt ===
The precise origin of the salts remains a topic of ongoing investigation. Some studies suggest that the calcium chloride may result from interactions between percolating water and the surrounding geological formations, particularly the weathered dolerite bedrock. This process could leach calcium ions into the water, contributing to the pond's high salinity.

Both near-surface brine flows and deeper groundwater sources are thought to contribute to Don Juan Pond's hydrology, though the relative importance of each mechanism remains uncertain. Continued research into these processes may also inform studies of similar saline environments on other planetary bodies, such as Mars.

== Life ==
Studies of lifeforms in the hypersaline (and/or brine) water of Don Juan Pond have found a "sparse microflora of four species of heterotrophic bacteria and a yeast".

== Literature ==
- Yamagata, N.; T. Torii, S. Murata. "Report of the Japanese summer parties in Dry Valleys, Victoria Land, 1963–65; V – Chemical composition of lake waters". Antarctic Record. 29: 53–75.
