= Osmund Holm-Hansen =

Norwegian-born American scientist

Osmund Holm-Hansen (also known as Oz Holm-Hansen) was a Norwegian-born American scientist, for whom Mount Holm-Hansen, in Antarctica is named. A plant physiologist by training, from 1962 Holm-Hansen was the head of polar research at the Scripps Institution of Oceanography.

Beginning in 1976, Holm-Hansen conducted extensive field research on microbial populations in McMurdo Sound, the Ross Sea, and other ocean areas south of the Antarctic Convergence.
