= Kennedy Peak (Washington) =

Mountain in Washington, United States

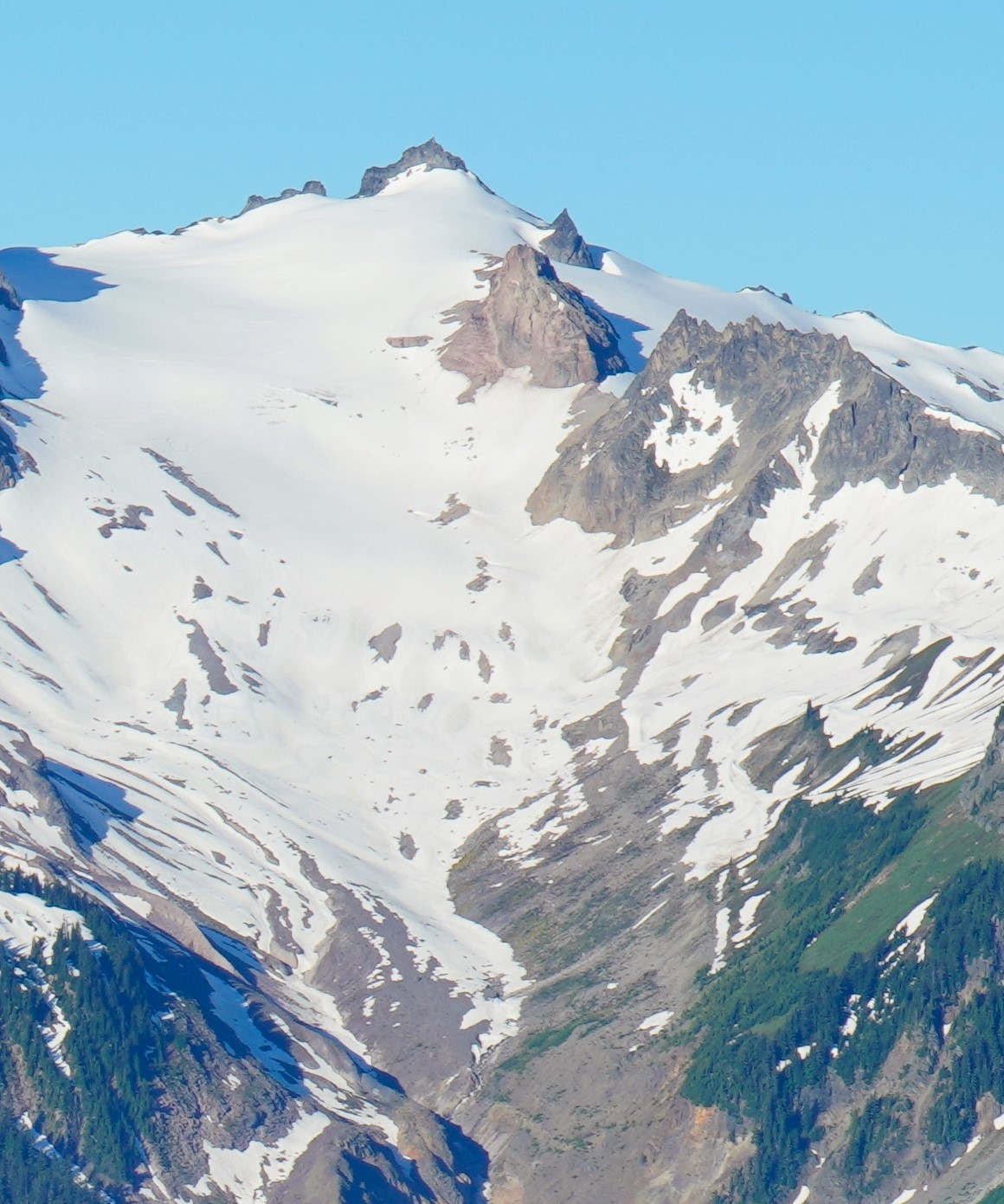
- Northeast aspect

Highest point
- Elevation: 8,381 ft (2,555 m)
- Prominence: 392 ft (119 m)
- Parent peak: Glacier Peak (10,549 ft)
- Isolation: 0.43 mi (0.69 km)
- Coordinates: 48°07′55″N 121°07′31″W

Naming
- Etymology: John F. Kennedy

Geography
- Location within Washington (state) Location within the United States
- Interactive map of Kennedy Peak
- Country: United States
- State: Washington
- County: Snohomish
- Protected area: Glacier Peak Wilderness
- Parent range: Cascade Range; North Cascades
- Topo map: USGS Lime Mountain

Geology
- Rock age: Quaternary
- Rock type: Andesite
- Volcanic arc: Cascade Volcanic Arc

Kennedy Peak is an 8,381-foot (2,555-metre) summit in Snohomish County, Washington, United States.

== Description ==
Kennedy Peak is located 24 miles (39 km) east-southeast of Darrington in the heart of the Glacier Peak Wilderness on land managed by Mount Baker-Snoqualmie National Forest. It is set 1.5 mile (2.4 km) immediately north-northwest of Glacier Peak in the North Cascades. Kennedy ranks as the fifth-highest peak in Snohomish County and 95th-highest in the state. Precipitation runoff from the peak drains west to the White Chuck River via Kennedy Creek, and north into Milk and Vista creeks which are tributaries of the Suiattle River. Topographic relief is significant as the summit rises 6,400 feet (1,951 meters) above the Suiattle River in six miles (9.7 km) and 2,400 feet (732 meters) above the Kennedy Glacier in one-quarter mile (0.4 km). The Pacific Crest Trail traverses the peak's west slope. The mountain's toponym was officially adopted by the United States Board on Geographic Names in 1963 which was the year that President John F. Kennedy was assassinated.

== Geology ==
Subduction and tectonic activity in the area began during the Late Cretaceous epoch, about 90 million years ago. The area was previously an oceanic environment, consisting mainly of sedimentary and volcanic rocks. Extensive volcanic activity began to take place in the oligocene, about 35 million years ago. However, mountain building in the area did not begin until the Miocene, approximately 10 million years ago. Glacier Peak, a stratovolcano that is south-southeast of Kennedy Peak, began forming in the mid-Pleistocene. Kennedy Peak is composed of Quaternary andesite of the volcanic lava flows from Glacier Peak.

Throughout the ice age, the North Cascades were mostly covered in thick glaciers, extending to near Puget Sound. Glaciation was most prevalent approximately 18,000 years ago, and most valleys were ice-free by 12,000 years ago. As a result, valleys in the area are deep and U-shaped, and mountains tend to be rocky, with steep slopes and narrow summits.

== Climate ==
Kennedy Peak is located in the marine west coast climate zone of western North America. Most weather fronts originating in the Pacific Ocean travel northeast toward the Cascade Mountains. As fronts approach the North Cascades, they are forced upward by the peaks of the Cascade Range (orographic lift), causing them to drop their moisture in the form of rain or snowfall onto the Cascades. As a result, the west side of the North Cascades experiences high precipitation, especially during the winter months in the form of snowfall. Because of maritime influence, snow tends to be wet and heavy, resulting in high avalanche danger. During winter months weather is usually cloudy, but due to high pressure systems over the Pacific Ocean that intensify during summer months, there is often little or no cloud cover during the summer. Due to its temperate climate and proximity to the Pacific Ocean, areas west of the Cascade Crest very rarely experience temperatures below 0 °F (−18 °C) or above 80 °F (27 °C). This climate supports the Kennedy Glacier, Vista Glacier, and the Ptarmigan Glacier surrounding the peak.

== Gallery ==
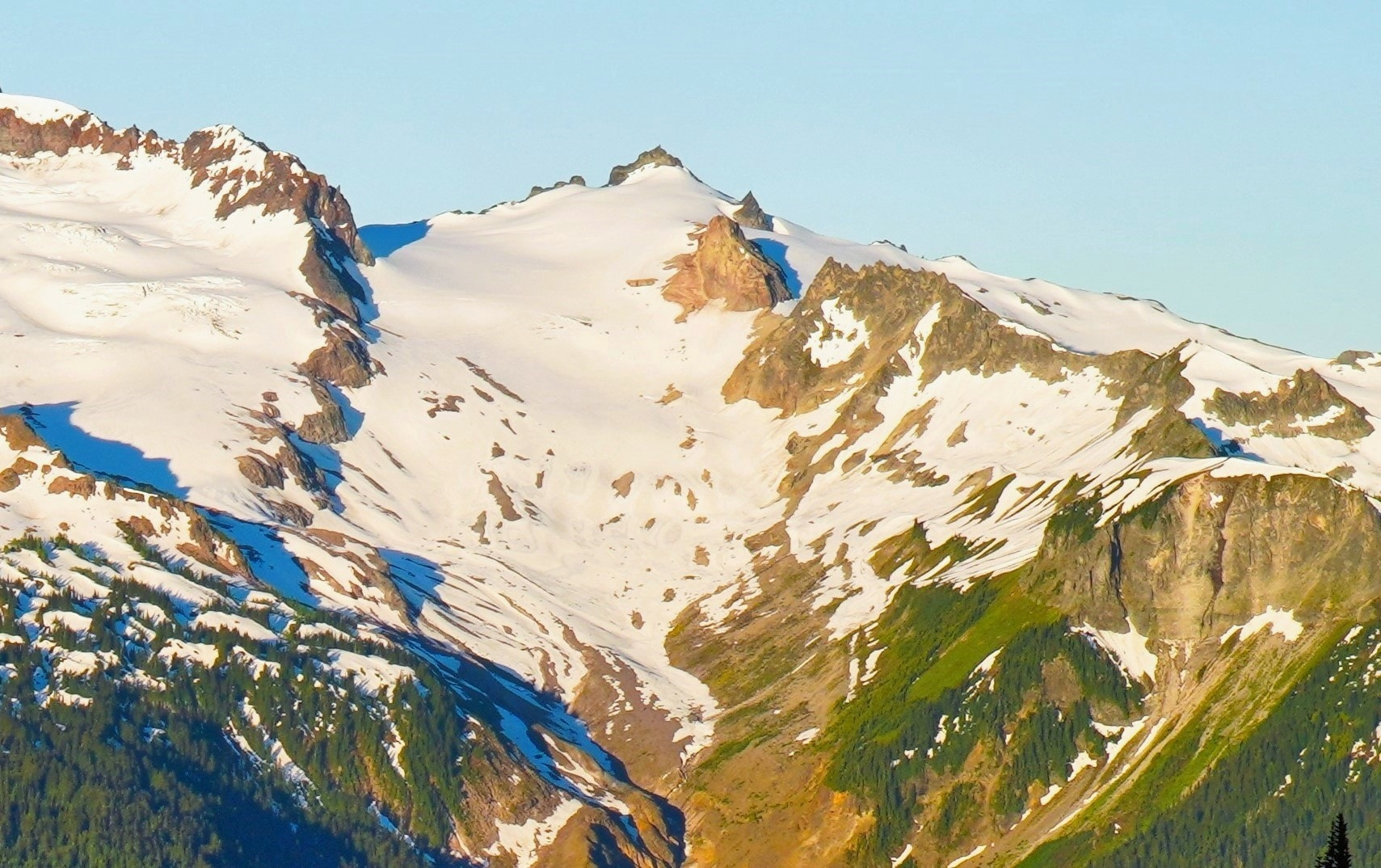
Kennedy Peak from Miners Ridge

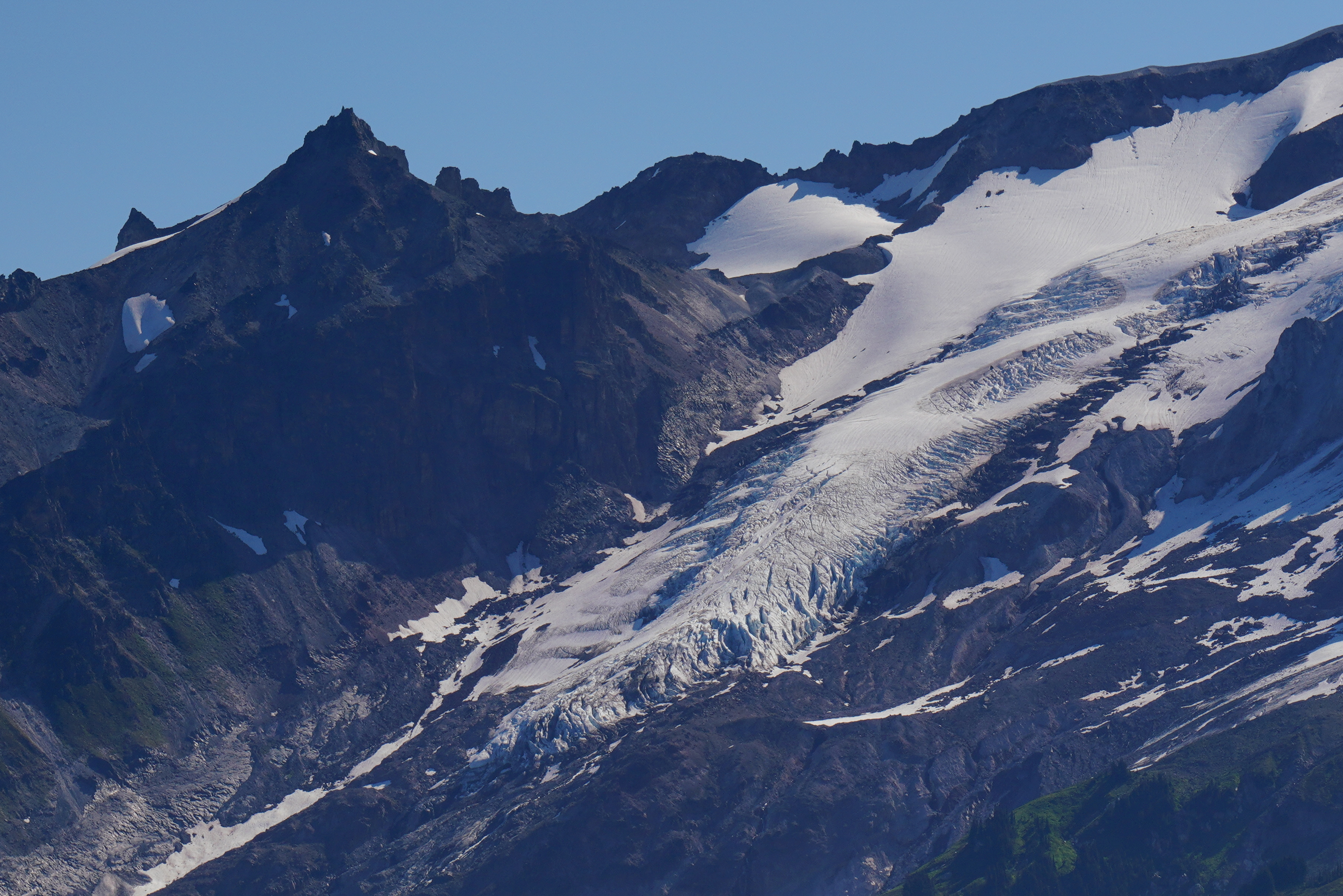
West aspect of Kennedy Peak to the left, with Kennedy Glacier

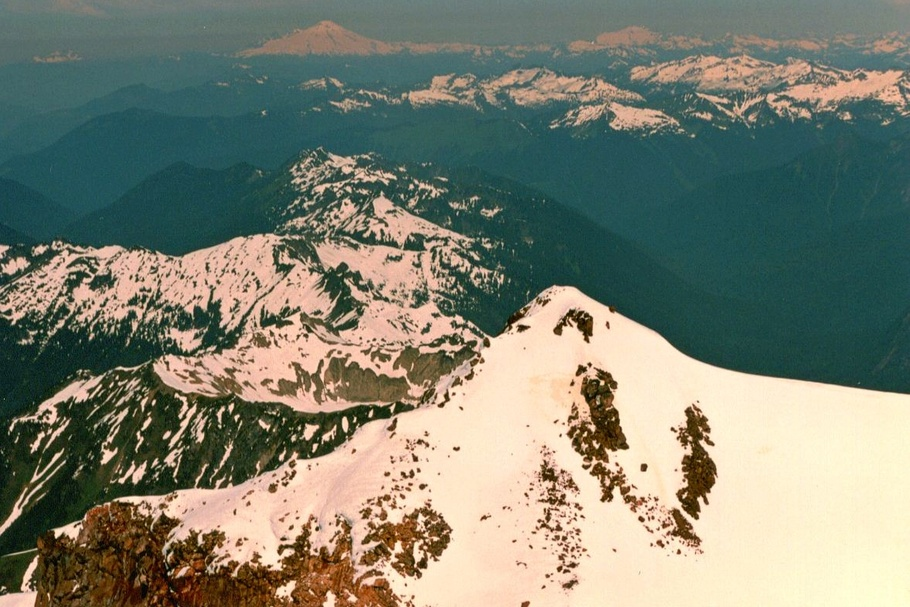
South aspect of Kennedy Peak (foreground) seen from Glacier Peak summit

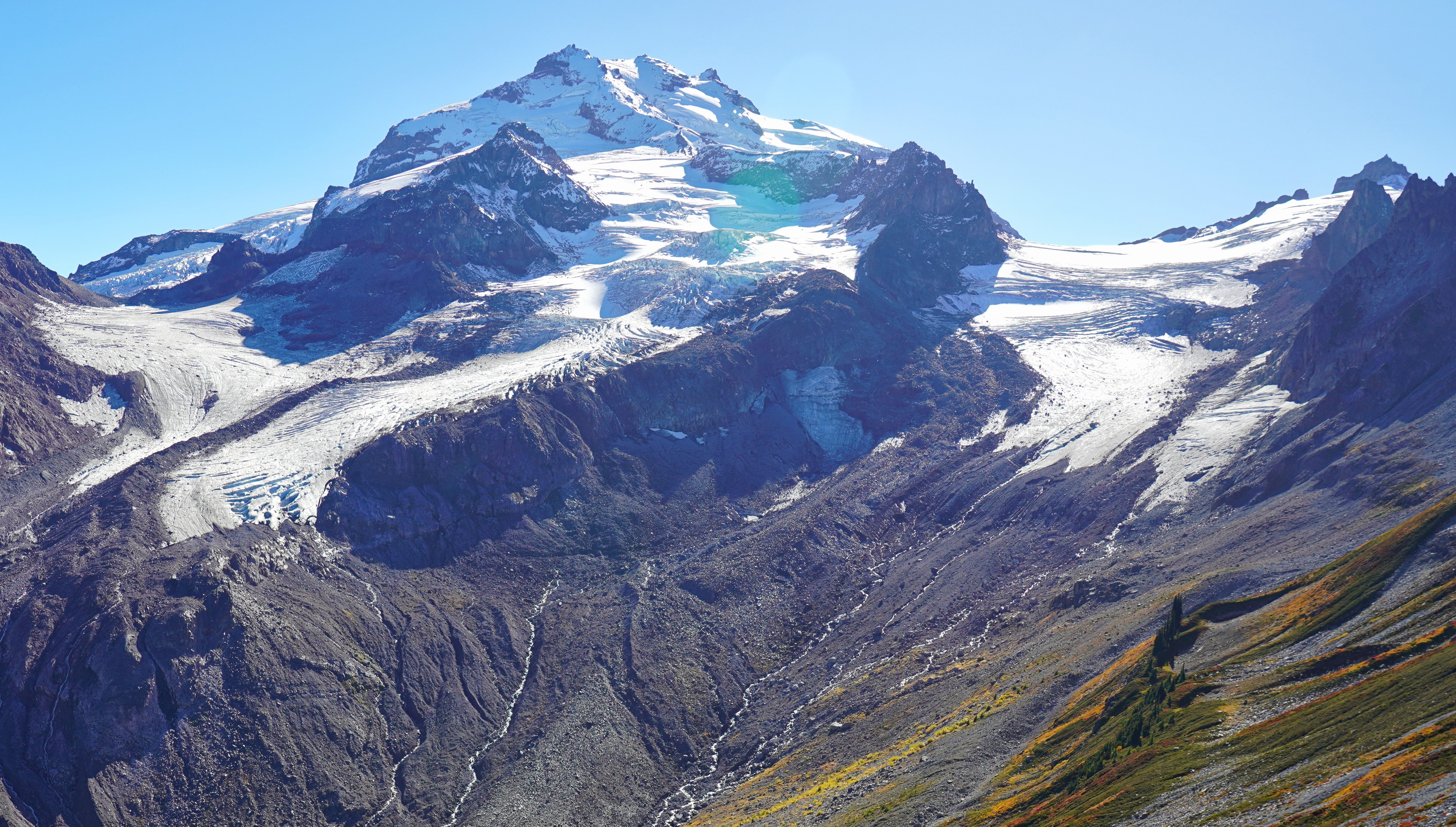
Kennedy Peak (upper right) and Glacier Peak

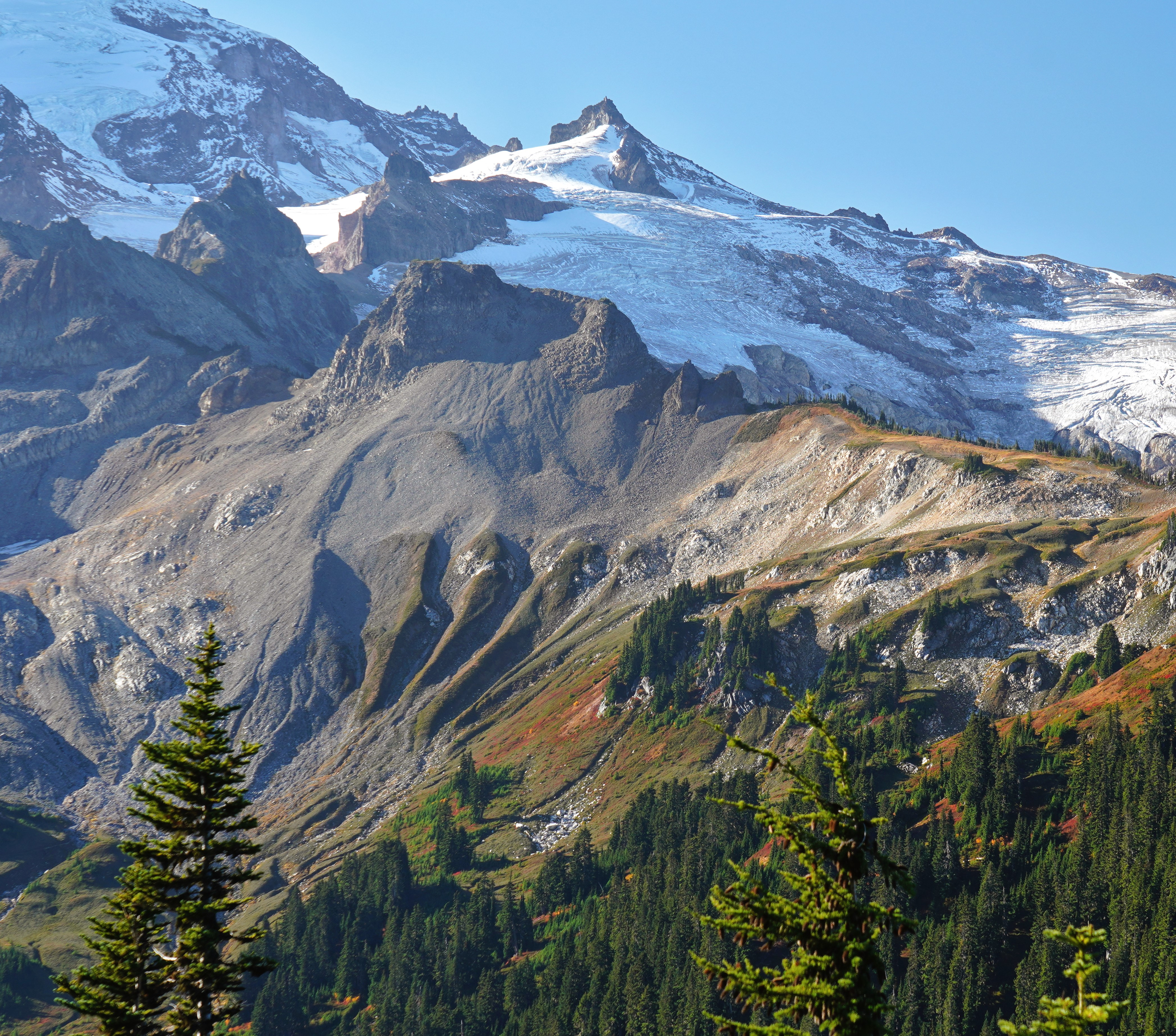
Kennedy Peak centered at top

== See also ==
- Geography of the North Cascades
- Geology of the Pacific Northwest
