= Prospect Mesa =

Prospect Mesa (77°30′S 161°52′E) is a low mesa in Victoria Land, in eastern Antarctica. It lies below Bull Pass on the north side of Wright Valley.

The name designates that it is part of the regional geological Prospect Formation. It was named by geologists C. G. Vucetich and W. W. Topping of the Victoria University of Wellington Antarctic Expedition (VUWAE), during a 1969–70 expedition.
