= Horowitz Ridge =

Mountain ridge in Antarctica

- Location within Antarctica

Geography
- Continent: Antarctica
- Region: Victoria Land
- Range coordinates: 77°37′S 162°6′E

The Horowitz Ridge (77°37′S 162°6′E) is a rock ridge between David Valley and King Valley in the Asgard Range of Victoria Land, Antarctica.

== Naming ==
The Horowitz Ridge was named for Professor Norman Horowitz of the California Institute of Technology, whose interest in the analogy of Antarctica to Mars led him to suggest the value of Victoria Land Dry Valley studies in regard to Martian life detection. The studies were undertaken in 1966–68 by a United States Antarctic Research Program biological party led by Roy E. Cameron, who suggested the naming.

== Location ==
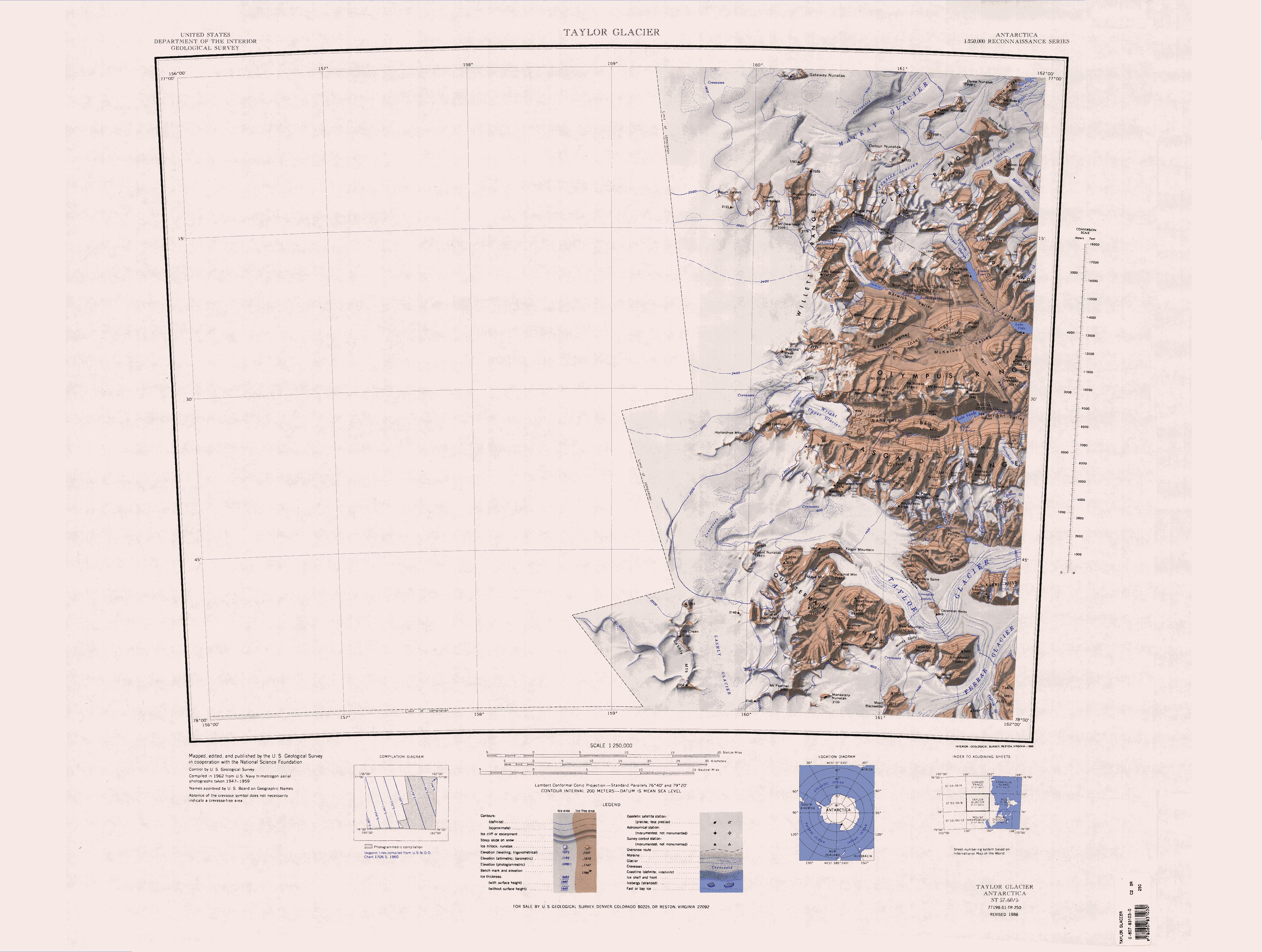
Asgard Range south of center of mapped region

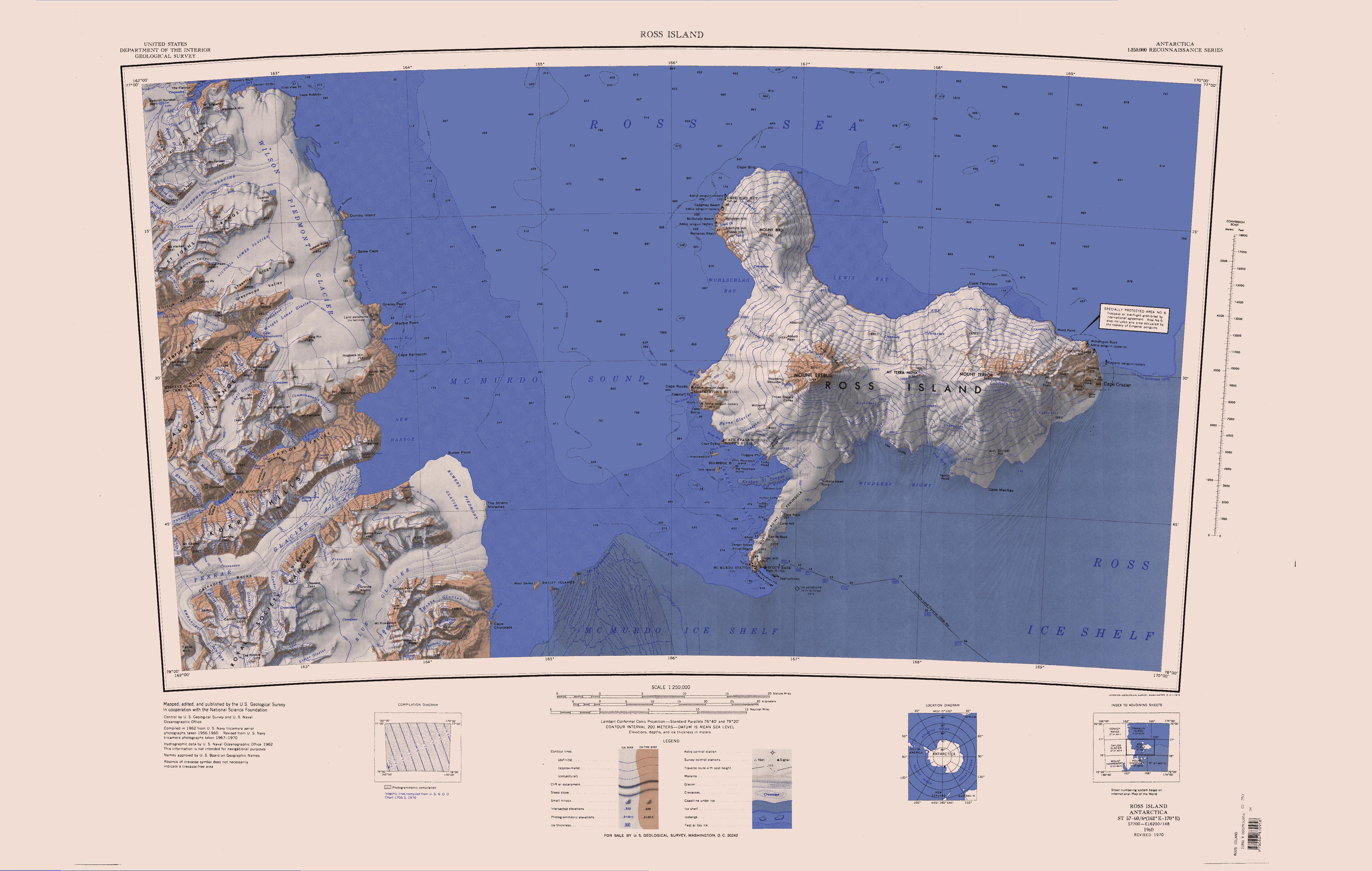
East end of Asgard Range south of center

The Horowitz Ridge lies between King Valley to the northwest and David Valley to the east. The head of the Conrow Glacier, which flows north towards Wright Valley is to the north of the ridge. The head of the Rhone Glacier, which flows southeast towards Taylor Valley, is to the south.

== Features ==
Features near to the ridge include, from south to north:

=== Mount Darby ===
77.66676°S 162.194664°E. A mountain rising to 1,750 metres (5,740 ft) on the divide between Rhone Glacier and Matterhorn Glacier. The mountain stands 1.3 nautical miles (2.4 km; 1.5 mi) northwest of Mount J. J. Thomson. Named by the New Zealand Geographic Board (NZGB) (1998) after Marie Darby, marine biologist of the Canterbury Museum, Christchurch.} Her January 1968 voyage to McMurdo Sound in the Magga Dan marks the first visit of a New Zealand woman scientist to Antarctica.

=== Norris Glacier ===
77.658871°S 162.222984°E. A glacier flowing eastward between Kennedy Glacier and Mount Darby into the upper part of Matterhorn Glacier. Named by the NZGB (1998) after Baden Norris, Honorary Curator of the Antarctic collection, Canterbury Museum; historian who worked in Antarctica as a conservator of historic huts.

=== Kottmeier Mesa ===
77.645373°S 162.144533°E. A prominent 2,120 metres (6,960 ft) high mesa, 2.8 nautical miles (5.2 km; 3.2 mi) northwest of Mount J. J. Thomson. Almost wholly ice covered, the mesa is 1.5 nautical miles (2.8 km; 1.7 mi) long, averages 0.5 nautical miles (0.93 km; 0.58 mi) wide, and rises above the converging heads of David Valley, Bartley Glacier, Matterhorn Glacier, and the north flank of Rhone Glacier, all receiving ice that drains from the feature. Named by the United States Advisory Committee on Antarctic Names (US-ACAN) (1997) after Steven T. Kottmeier, who as a United States Antarctic Project (United States ArmyP) researcher, 1981-87, investigated sea ice microbial communities in the fast ice of McMurdo Sound, as well as krill associated with ice edge zones in Bellingshausen, Scotia and Weddell Seas. Served as the Manager, Laboratory Facilities, McMurdo Station for ITT Antarctic Services, 1988-90; Manager, Laboratory Science, 1990-96 and Chief Scientist from 1997 for Antarctic Support Associates (ASA).

=== Bromley Peak ===
77.633068°S 162.074149°E. A peak, 2,020 metres (6,630 ft) high, marking the summit of Horowitz Ridge. The peak stands 1.8 nautical miles (3.3 km; 2.1 mi) west of Vogler Peak. Named by the NZGB (1998) after A. M. (Tony) Bromley, a New Zealand Polar Medalist involved in Antarctic meteorological research for 30 years; member of the 1974 Vanda Station winter party.

=== Fenrir Valley ===
77°37′S 161°56′E. A small, mainly ice-free valley between the upper reaches of the Heimdall Glacier and Rhone Glacier. The name, applied by New Zealand Antarctic Place-Names Committee (NZ-APC) and the US-ACAN in consultation, is one in a group in the range derived from Norse mythology, wherein Fenrir is a wolf chained by Tiw.

=== Mount Grendal ===
77°34′S 162°00′E. A peak rising to 2,000 metres (6,600 ft) high between the heads of Valhalla Glacier and Conrow Glacier. Mapped by the USGS in 1962 from United States Navy aerial photographs taken 1947-59. Named by the NZ-APC in 1983 from association with Mount Beowulf (q.v.) after Grendal (Grendel), the monster in the Old English epic poem Beowulf.

=== David Valley ===
77°37′S 162°08′E. A small partially ice-free valley lying above the Conrow Glacier and east of Horowitz Ridge. Named by Roy E. Cameron, leader of a USARP biological party to the valley in 1967-68, for Charles N. David, a member of that party.

=== King Valley ===
77°37′S 162°03′E. A small ice-free valley lying above the Conrow Glacier and west of Horowitz Ridge. Named by Roy E. Cameron, leader of a United States Antarctic Research Program (USARP) biological party to the valley in 1967-68, for Jonathan A. King, a member of that party.

=== Mount Holm-Hansen ===
77.602379°S 162.191134°E. A prominent mountain rising to 1,920 metres (6,300 ft) high between lower David Valley and Bartley Glacier. Named by the US-ACAN in 1997 after Osmund Holm-Hansen, plant physiologist, who, working in the 1959-60 season, was one of the first American scientists to visit and conduct research in both Taylor Valley and Wright Valley; Research Biologist, Scripps Institution of Oceanography from 1962; extensive field research from 1976 includes studies of microbial populations in McMurdo Sound, the Ross Sea, and other ocean areas south of the Antarctic Convergence.

=== Bifrost Ledge ===
77.583333°S 162.183333°E. A flat benchlike feature that rises to 1,750 metres (5,740 ft) high on the north side of Mount Holm-Hansen. Named by the NZGB (1998) in association with names from Norse mythology in Asgard Range, Bifröst being a “bridge” linking Asgard (home of the gods) with earth.

=== Godwit Glacier ===
77.593659°S 162.209893°E. A glacier that flows northeast from Mount Holm-Hansen into Bartley Glacier. Named by the NZGB (1998) after a migratory bird which summers in New Zealand.

== Sources ==
- Alberts, Fred G., ed. (1995), Geographic Names of the Antarctic (PDF) (2 ed.), United States Board on Geographic Names This article incorporates public domain material from websites or documents of the United States Board on Geographic Names.
- "Bifrost Ledge", Geographic Names Information System, United States Geological Survey, United States Department of the Interior
- "Bromley Peak", Geographic Names Information System, United States Geological Survey, United States Department of the Interior
- "Godwit Glacier", Geographic Names Information System, United States Geological Survey, United States Department of the Interior
- "Kottmeier Mesa", Geographic Names Information System, United States Geological Survey, United States Department of the Interior
- "Mount Darby", Geographic Names Information System, United States Geological Survey, United States Department of the Interior
- "Mount Holm-Hansen", Geographic Names Information System, United States Geological Survey, United States Department of the Interior
- "Norris Glacier", Geographic Names Information System, United States Geological Survey, United States Department of the Interior
- Ross Island, USGS: United States Geological Survey
- Taylor Glacier, USGS: United States Geological Survey

This article incorporates public domain material from websites or documents of the United States Geological Survey.
