= Vanda Station =

- Antarctic research station
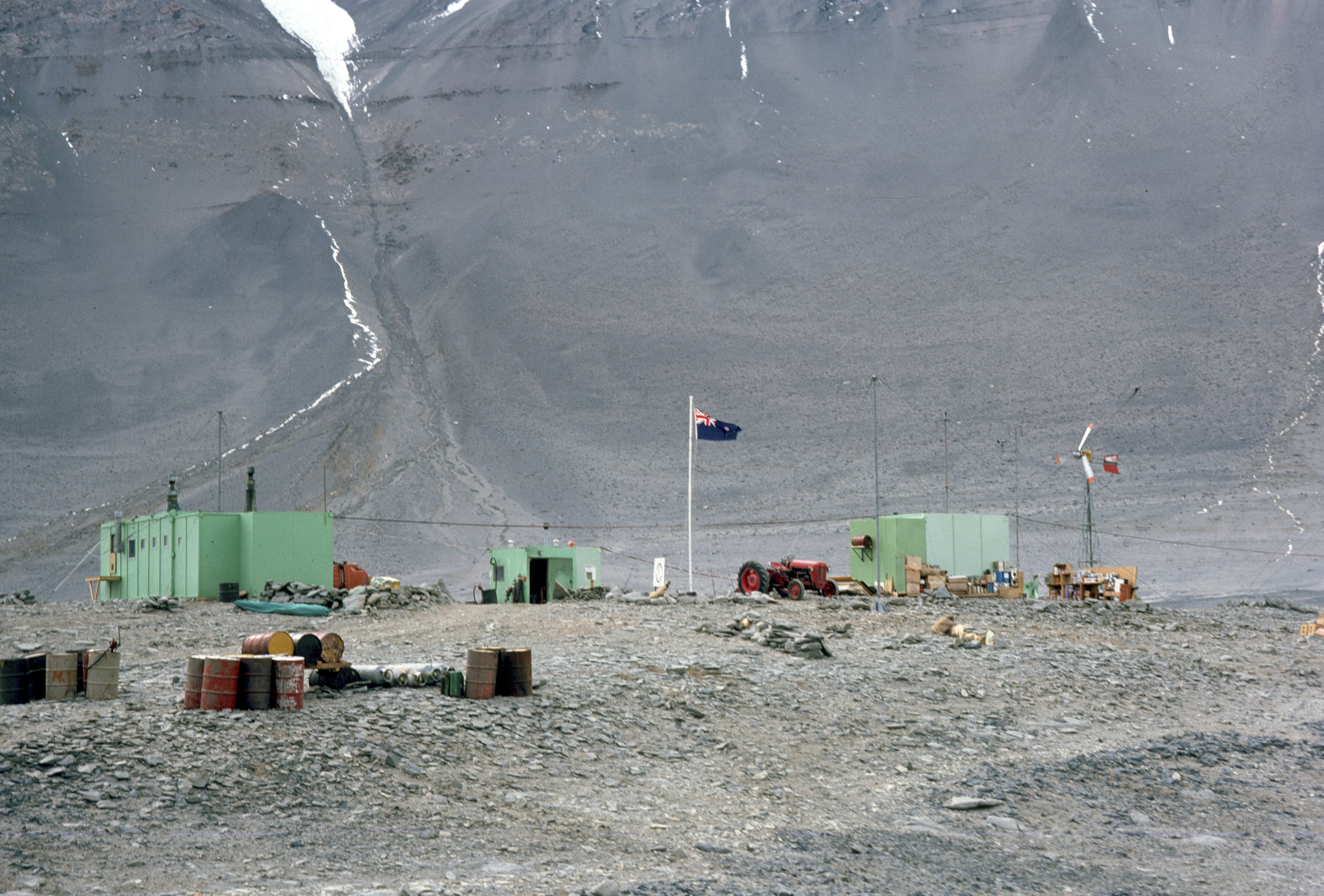
- The station in November 1975

- Location in Antarctica
- Coordinates: 77°31′00″S 161°40′00″E
- Region: Victoria Land
- Location: Near Lake Vanda
- Established: 9 January 1969
- Closed: 1995

Government
  - Type: Administration
  - Body: DSIR, New Zealand

Population
  - Summer: 8
  - Winter: 5
- Time zone: UTC+12 (NZST)
  - Summer (DST): UTC+13 (NZDST)
- Active times: All year-round until 1974, every summer from 1976

Vanda Station was an Antarctic research base in the western highlands (Victoria Land) of the Ross Dependency, specifically on the shore of Lake Vanda, at the mouth of Onyx River, in the Wright Valley. It operated from 1969 to 1995, and was west of New Zealand's Scott Base on Ross Island which remains in operation.

== History ==
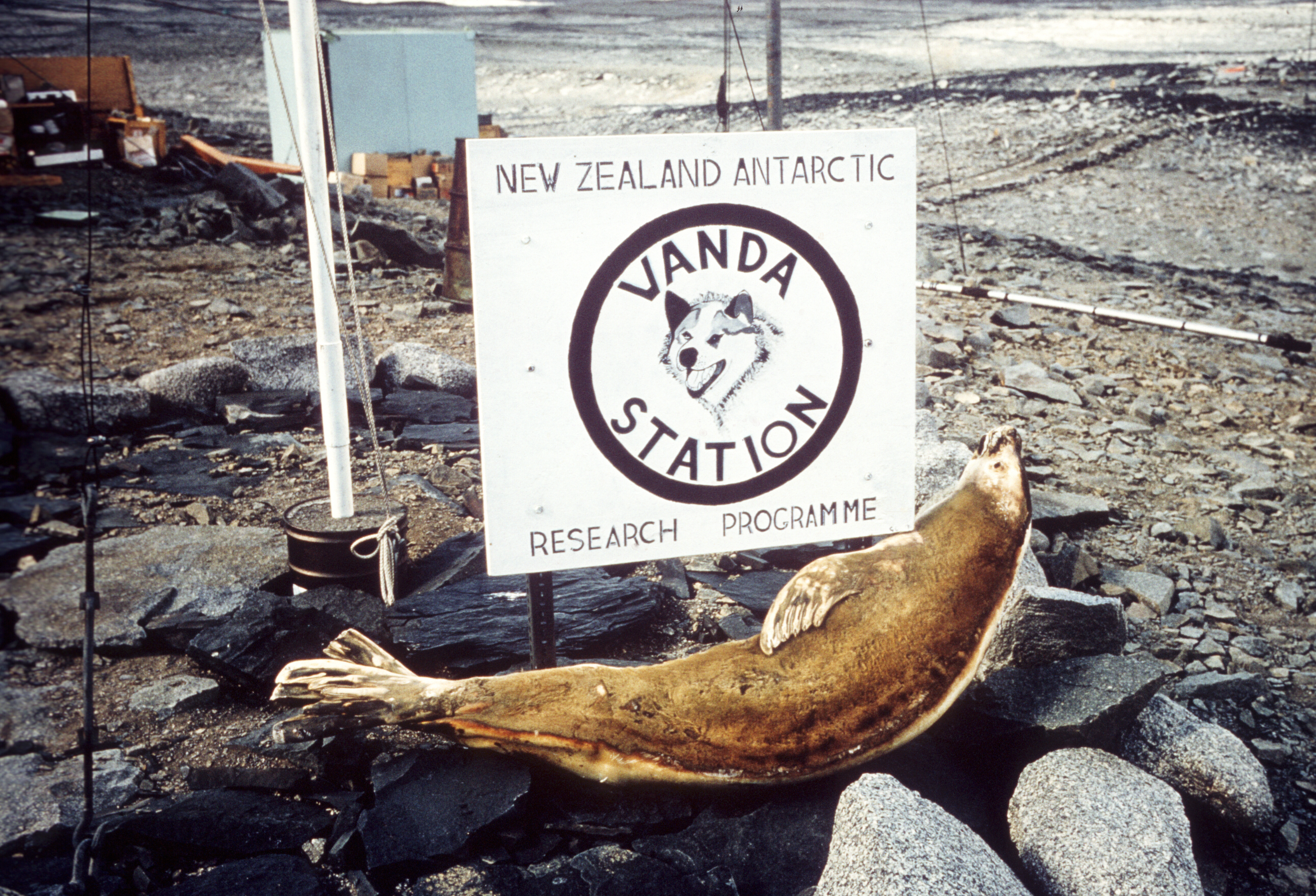
Vanda Station sign

The four original station buildings were constructed in the austral summers of 1967–1968 and 1968–1969, just prior to the first winter-over by a five-man team from January to October 19, 1969. Subsequent wintering parties occupied the station in 1970 and 1974. During summer seasons, Vanda station was fully staffed until 1991. Scientific programs principally included meteorology, hydrology, seismology, earth currents, and magnetics. The station was administered by the Department of Scientific and Industrial Research (DSIR), and was supported logistically by the permanent New Zealand research base of Scott Base on Ross Island.

Vanda Station was well known for The Royal Lake Vanda Swim Club. Visitors to Lake Vanda Station could dip into the waters when the icecap edge melted out during summer to form a "moat", and receive a Royal Lake Vanda Swim Club shoulder patch. Vanda staff would assist the melt by hacking out a "pool". Many dignitaries and politicians were inducted into the club. The dip had to be naked (Rule 1), complete immersion (Rule 4), witnessed by a "Vandal" (Vanda Station staffer) and with no restrictions on photography (Rule 6) to qualify. Rule 10 allowed a natural figleaf, but it had to be natural and also naturally green without artificial aid.

In 1995, environment concerns resulted in the base being closed. Various activities associated with the base's occupation, including excavations, the erection of buildings, disturbances caused by vehicle movements, the storage of consumables, waste disposal, and accidental spills, led to the effort to remove the station. Since removal, analysis of the lake water and algae was performed for a number of years to ensure the lake was not contaminated by greywater and other wastes.

There is now a street named after this base in Queenstown, New Zealand, called Vanda Place, and it is located just a few hundred metres from Scott Place.

Today, an automatic weather station is at the site of former Vanda Station, and Lake Vanda Hut, a shelter that is periodically occupied (only in the summer) by 2 to 8 New Zealand stream researchers.

== Climate ==
Climate data for Vanda Station
Month	Jan	Feb	Mar	Apr	May	Jun	Jul	Aug	Sep	Oct	Nov	Dec	Year
Record high °C (°F)	15.0 (59.0)	4.4 (39.9)	—	—	—	—	—	—	2.6 (36.7)	0.7 (33.3)	9.5 (49.1)	14.3 (57.7)	15.0 (59.0)
Mean daily maximum °C (°F)	4.7 (40.5)	−2.1 (28.2)	−15.6 (3.9)	−25.4 (−13.7)	−23.5 (−10.3)	−25.1 (−13.2)	−33.4 (−28.1)	−26.5 (−15.7)	−25.7 (−14.3)	−10.0 (14.0)	−1.6 (29.1)	3.6 (38.5)	−15.0 (4.9)
Daily mean °C (°F)	1.4 (34.5)	−5.9 (21.4)	−20.4 (−4.7)	−29.7 (−21.5)	−29.2 (−20.6)	−30.0 (−22.0)	−38.0 (−36.4)	−32.3 (−26.1)	−31.2 (−24.2)	−15.7 (3.7)	−6.2 (20.8)	0.2 (32.4)	−19.7 (−3.6)
Mean daily minimum °C (°F)	−2 (28)	−9.7 (14.5)	−25.1 (−13.2)	−34.0 (−29.2)	−34.8 (−30.6)	−34.8 (−30.6)	−42.6 (−44.7)	−38.1 (−36.6)	−36.7 (−34.1)	−21.4 (−6.5)	−10.9 (12.4)	−3.1 (26.4)	−24.4 (−12.0)
Average snowy days	3.8	3.0	7.0	2.0	5.0	6.0	2.0	5.0	2.0	0.7	1.9	3.5	41.9

== See also ==
- List of inactive Antarctic research stations
- List of Antarctic field camps
- Crime in Antarctica
- Climate of Antarctica

== Bibliography ==
- Vanda Station: History of an Antarctic Outpost by David L. Harrowfield (Christchurch 1999 & 2006, New Zealand Antarctic Society Inc, 52 pp.) ISBN 0-473-06467-7
