= Ermine Glacier =

Glacier in Washington, United States

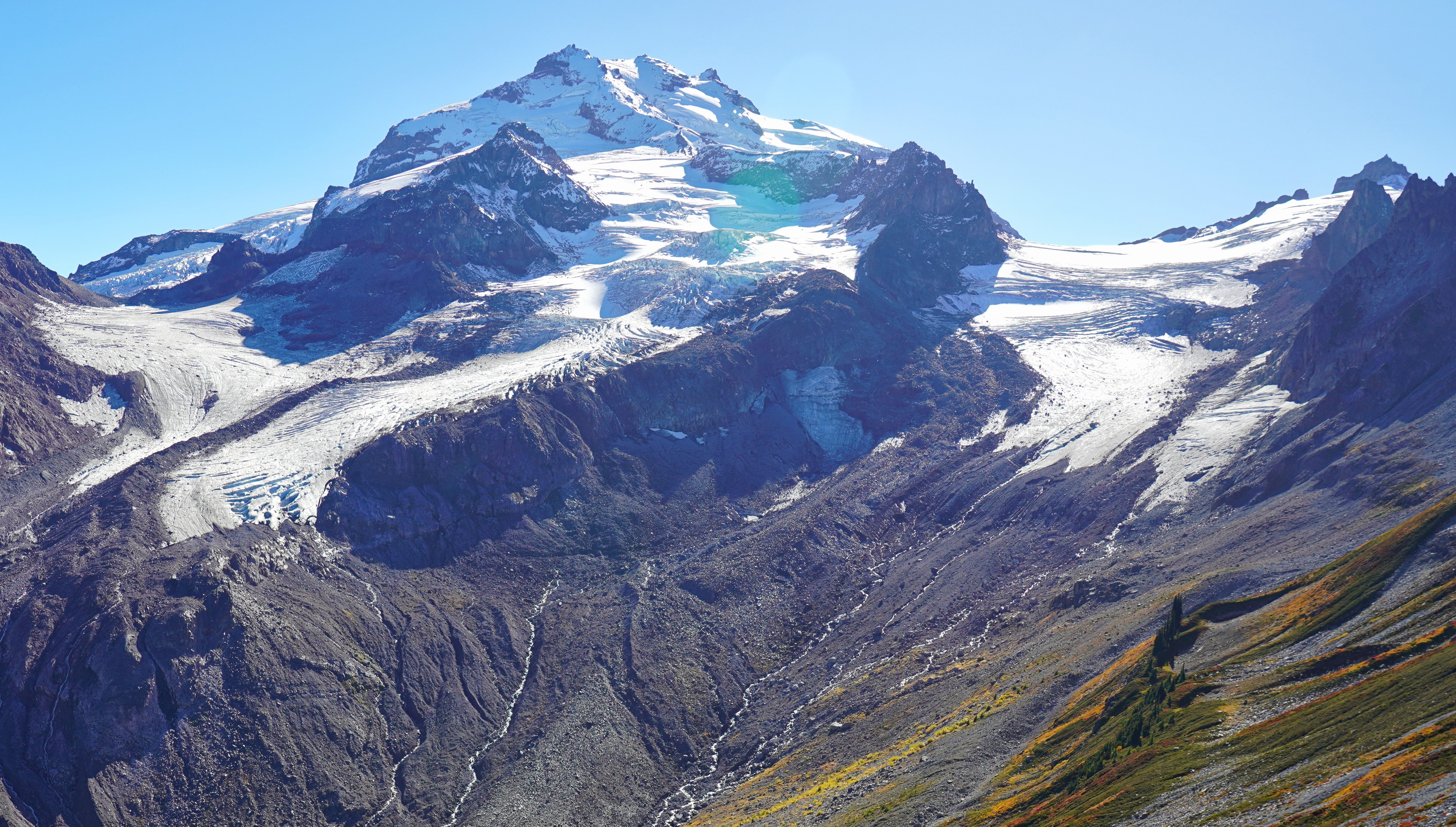
- Ermine Glacier center and left (Vista Glacier to right)

- Location within Washington (state)
- Type: Mountain glacier
- Location: Glacier Peak, Snohomish County, Washington, USA
- Coordinates: 48°08′08″N 121°06′21″W
- Length: 1.25 mi (2.01 km)
- Terminus: Ice fall and barren rock
- Status: Retreating

Ermine Glacier is located on north slopes of Glacier Peak in the U.S. state of Washington. As is true with all the glaciers found on Glacier Peak, Ermine Glacier is retreating. During the Little Ice Age, Ermine Glacier extended down to an altitude of 4,400 ft (1,300 m) and was connected to Vista Glacier to its west. From the end of the Little Ice Age to the mid-1950s, Ermine Glacier experienced a general retreat upslope, followed by an advance during a cooler and wetter period until the mid-1970s. However, between 1992 and 2005, Ermine Glacier again retreated 308 m (1,010 ft).

== See also ==
- List of glaciers in the United States
