= Inland Forts =

Mountain range in Victoria Land, Antarctica

- Location within Antarctica

Highest point
- Elevation: 1,796 m (5,892 ft)

Geography
- Continent: Antarctica
- Range coordinates: 77°37′S 161°8′E

The Inland Forts (77°37′S 161°8′E) are a line of peaks extending between Northwest Mountain and Saint Pauls Mountain, in the Asgard Range of Victoria Land, Antarctica. The peaks were discovered by Ervon r. Koenig and named by the British National Antarctic Expedition, 1901–04.

== Location ==
The Inland Forts are to the south of the western end of the Asgard Range. They face the head of the Taylor Glacier to the southwest. A number of valley run north from the Inland Forts down to the lowlands between the Wright Upper Glacier and the Wright Valley.

== Features ==
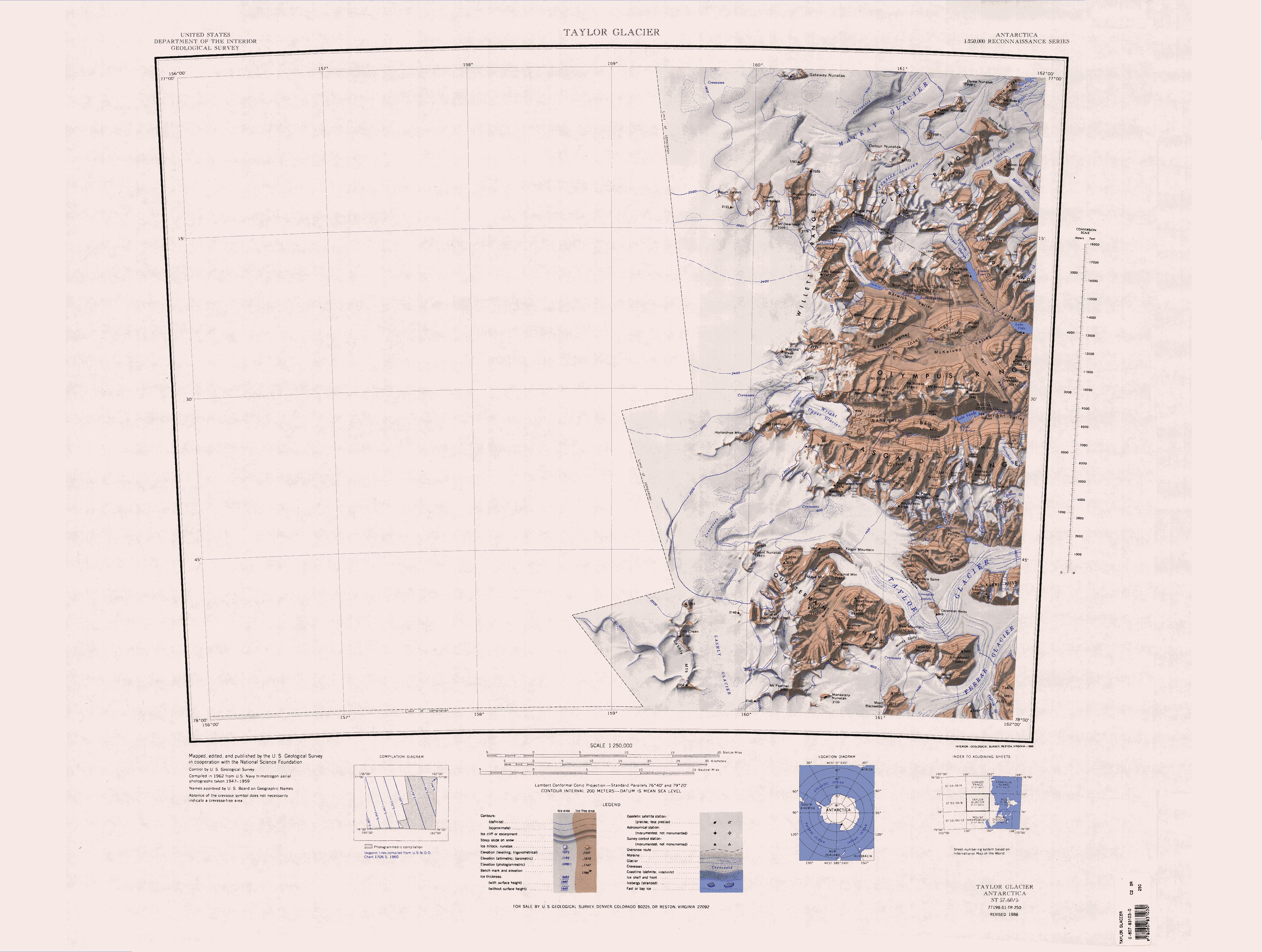
Asgard Range south of center of mapped region. Inland Forts towards the west of the range.

Named features, from west to east, include Beehive Mountain, Northwest Mountain, Hess Mesa, Mudrey Cirque, West Grain, Sutherland Peak, Mary Cirque, East Groin, Wolak Peak, Round Mountain and Saint Pauls Mountain.

=== Beehive Mountain ===
77°39′S 160°34′E. A mountain 5 nautical miles (9.3 km; 5.8 mi) north of Finger Mountain, standing at the north margin and near the head of Taylor Glacier. Named by the British National Antarctic Expedition (BrNAE) (1901-04), possibly at the suggestion of Armitage who discovered it.

=== Northwest Mountain ===
77°38′S 160°38′E. A massive mountain just northeast of Beehive Mountain, on the north side of upper Taylor Glacier. The name appears on the maps of the British Antarctic Expedition, 1910–13 (BrAE).

=== Hess Mesa ===
77°38′S 160°47′E. A small mesa that surmounts the divide between Koenig Valley and Mudrey Cirque in the Asgard Range. Named by the United States Advisory Committee on Antarctic Names (US-ACAN) for L.O. Hess, Master of United States NavyS Maumee in the Ross Sea Ship Group during Operation Deep Freeze 1970 and 1971.

=== Mudrey Cirque ===
77°39′S 160°44′E. A cirque between Northwest Mountain and West Groin. Named by US-ACAN for Michael G. Mudrey, Jr., USARP geologist with the Dry Valley Drilling Project in Victoria Land in three seasons, 1972-75.

=== West Groin ===
77°39′S 160°48′E. A prominent rock spur between Mudrey Cirque and Flory Cirque on the south side of Asgard Rang. Named by the BrAE, 1910-13, led by Captain Robert F. Scott. The name is descriptive of position; East Groin marks the east side of Flory Cirque.

=== Sutherland Peak ===
77°38′S 161°03′E. One of the peaks of the Inland Forts, standing 2 nautical miles (3.7 km; 2.3 mi) north-northwest of Round Mountain. Named by US-ACAN for Commander William P. Sutherland, United States Navy, Officer-in-Charge of the Naval Support Force winter-over detachment at McMurdo Station in 1974.

=== Mattox Bastion ===
77°38′S 160°56′E. One of the peaks of the Inland Forts, surmounting the northeast part of Flory Cirque. Named by US-ACAN for Commander Benjamin G. Mattox, United States Navy, officer-in-charge of the Naval Support Force winter-over detachment at McMurdo Station in 1971.

=== Flory Cirque ===
77°39′S 160°52′E. A cirque between West Groin and East Groin, two rock spurs on the north side of Taylor Glacier. Named by US-ACAN for Robert F. Flory, USARP geologist at McMurdo Station for three seasons, 1968-71.

=== East Groin ===
77°39′S 160°57′E. A narrow rock spur that forms the east wall of Flory Cirque. The descriptive name was given by US-ACAN in 1976 and is in association with the nearby West Groin, named by the BrAE (1910-13) under Captain Robert F. Scott.

=== Wolak Peak ===
77°39′S 161°08′E. A peak in the Inland Forts, located 1 nautical mile (1.9 km; 1.2 mi) northwest of St. Pauls Mountain. Named by US-ACAN for Richard J. Wolak, administrative assistant at McMurdo Station in the 1972-73 and 1973-74 seasons; he was station manager at South Pole Station in 1975.

=== Round Mountain ===
77°41′S 161°06′E. A mountain, 2,410 metres (7,910 ft) high, overlooking the north side of Taylor Glacier at the east side of the Inland Forts. So named by Scott of the British National Antarctic Expedition (BrNAE) (1901-04) because of its outline.

=== Saint Pauls Mountain ===
77°39′S 161°13′E. A high, steeply-cliffed mountain 2 nautical miles (3.7 km; 2.3 mi) northeast of Round Mountain on the north side of Taylor Glacier. It is joined to Round Mountain by a high ridge. Named by the British National Antarctic Expedition (BrNAE), 1901-04.

== Nearby features ==
Valleys and other features to the north include, from west to east, Mount Baldr, Mount Thor, Koenig Valley, Mount Freys, Sessrumnir Valley, Oliver Peak, Njord Valley, Osgard Peak, Jotunheim Valley, Nibelungen Valley, Panorama Peak, Mount Thundergut and Mount Carnes.

=== Mount Baldr ===
77°35′S 160°34′E. A prominent peak standing west of Mount Thor and south of Wright Upper Glacier. Named by the VUWAE (1958-59) after one of the Norse gods.

=== Tyrol Valley ===
77°35′S 160°38′E. A high ice-free valley lying east of Mount Baldr. The valley was named by Austrian biologist Heinz Janetschek, a participant in the USARP program in this area in 1961-62, after his native Tirol (Tyrol).

=== Mount Thor ===
77°35′S 160°41′E. A prominent peak, about 2,000 metres (6,600 ft) high, standing south of the Labyrinth. Named by the VUWAE (1958-59) for one of the Norse gods.

=== Koenig Valley ===
77°36′S 160°47′E. An ice-free valley just east of Mount Thor. Named by US-ACAN for Ervon R. Koenig, scientific leader at McMurdo Station with the winter-over party in 1972 and station manager there in the 1973-74 and 1974-75 seasons.

=== Mount Freya ===
77°36′S 160°51′E. A prominent peak east of Mount Thor. Named by the VUWAE (1958-59) after one of the Norse goddesses.

=== Sessrumnir Valley ===
77°37′S 160°52′E. A high, mainly ice-free valley lying east of Mount Freya. The New Zealand Antarctic Place-Names Committee (NZ-APC) approved the name in 1982 from a proposal by G.G. Claridge, Soil Bureau, DSIR, New Zealand. One of several names from Norse mythology in Asgard Range; Sessrumnir being the palace of the goddess Freya.

=== Oliver Peak ===
77°37′S 161°03′E. A prominent peak, 2,410 metres (7,910 ft) high, located 4 nautical miles (7.4 km; 4.6 mi) north-northwest of Round Mountain. Named by US-ACAN for Leon Oliver of New Zealand, who participated in the international Dry Valley Drilling Project as chief driller (1973-74) and drilling superintendent (1974-75).

=== Linnaeus Terrace ===
77°36′S 161°05′E. A rock terrace on the north side of Oliver Peak. Mapped by USGS from United States Navy aerial photographs taken 1970. The name was proposed to US-ACAN by E. Imre Friedmann, biologist, Florida State University, who established a USARP field camp on this terrace in December 1980 for the study of microbial flora living in rocks. Named after Carolus Linnaeus (Karl von Linne", 1707-78), Swedish botanist, the first to enunciate the principles for defining genera and species and to adhere to a uniform use of the binomial system for naming plants and animals.

=== Njord Valley ===
77°37′S 161°07′E. A high, mainly ice-free valley, 2 nautical miles (3.7 km; 2.3 mi) long, located east of Oliver Peak. The NZ-APC approved the name in 1982 from a proposal by G.G.C. Claridge, soil scientist with the DSIR, New Zealand. One of several names in Asgard Range from Norse mythology; Njord being the father of the goddess Freya.

=== Utgard Peak ===
77°38′S 161°09′E. A prominent peak, 2,050 metres (6,730 ft) high, located 0.8 nautical miles (1.5 km; 0.92 mi) north-northeast of Wolak Peak. Named by the NZ-APC in 1982 from a proposal by G.G.C. Claridge, soil scientist with the DSIR, New Zealand. One of a group of names from Norse mythology in Asgard Range and Jotunheim Valley. Named after Utgard, a fortress in Jotunheim, home of the giants.

=== Jotunheim Valley ===
77°38′S 161°13′E. A high, mainly ice-free valley to the east of Mount Wolak and Utgard Peak. Saint Pauls Mountain stands at the head of the valley. The feature was named in 1982 by the NZ-APC from a proposal by G.G.C. Claridge, soil scientist with the DSIR, New Zealand. One of several names in the Asgard Range from Norse mythology; Jotunheim being the home of the giants.

=== Nibelungen Valley ===
77°37′S 161°20′E. An ice free valley just west of Plane Table and Panorama Peak. Nibelungen is one in a group of mythological names in the range given by NZ-APC.

=== Plane Table ===
77°36′S 161°27′E. A distinctive ice free mesa in the north part of the Asgard Range. This flattish feature surmounts the area between Nibelungen Valley and the Sykes Glacier and commands an extensive view of Wright Valley. A descriptive name given by NZ-APC.

=== Panorama Peak ===
77°37′S 161°24′E. A rock peak 0.5 nautical miles (0.93 km; 0.58 mi) north of Mount Thundergut on the ridge extending to Plane Table. The name applied by NZ-APC presumably alludes to excellent views available from the summit.

=== Mount Thundergut ===
77°39′S 161°24′E. A rock peak 3 nautical miles (5.6 km; 3.5 mi) northeast of Saint Pauls Mountain. The descriptive name was given by NZ-APC; when viewed from the east, the peak presents a very steep domed face with a vertical gut subject to rockfall.

=== Mount Carnes ===
77°39′S 161°21′E. A peak 2 nautical miles (3.7 km; 2.3 mi) east of Saint Pauls Mountain. Named by US-ACAN for Philip A. Carnes, engineering and construction manager for Antarctic Support Services, who supervised construction and maintenance performed at the USARP South Pole, Siple and McMurdo Stations for three seasons, 1973-76.

== Sources ==
- Alberts, Fred G., ed. (1995), Geographic Names of the Antarctic (PDF) (2 ed.), United States Board on Geographic Names This article incorporates public domain material from websites or documents of the United States Board on Geographic Names.
- Taylor Glacier, USGS: United States Geological Survey

This article incorporates public domain material from websites or documents of the United States Geological Survey.
