= Kennedy Glacier (Antarctica) =

Glacier in Victoria Land, Antarctica

Kennedy Glacier (77°39′S 162°13′E) is a steep glacier, 0.8 nautical miles (1.5 km) long, flowing east from Kottmeier Mesa into the upper Matterhorn Glacier, Victoria Land, Antarctica. It was named by the Advisory Committee on Antarctic Names (1997) after Henry Kennedy, Deputy Director of the Antarctic Peninsula System for ITT Antarctic Services, 1985–90, with responsibility for Palmer Station and MV Polar Duke and procurement for RV Nathaniel B. Palmer. Kennedy worked on specialized technical projects with Antarctic Support Associates from 1990 to the time of naming.
