= Kennedy Glacier (Washington) =

Glacier in Washington, United States

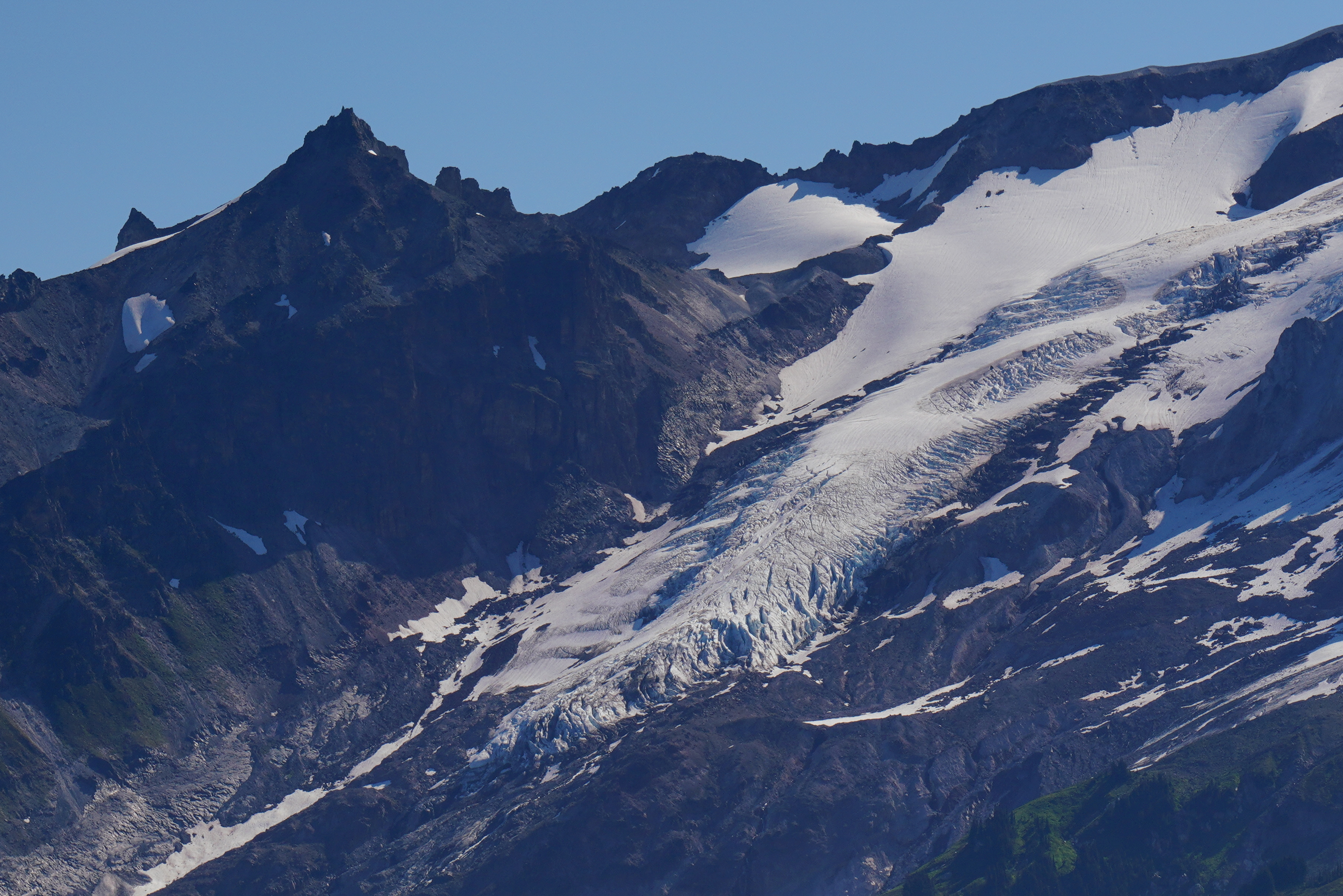
- Kennedy Glacier and Kennedy Peak (left)

- Location within Washington (state)
- Type: Mountain glacier
- Location: Glacier Peak, Snohomish County, Washington, USA
- Coordinates: 48°07′30″N 121°07′22″W
- Length: 1.5 mi (2.4 km)
- Terminus: Icefall
- Status: Retreating

Kennedy Glacier is located on northwest slopes of Glacier Peak in the U.S. state of Washington. As is true with all the glaciers found on Glacier Peak, Kennedy Glacier is retreating. During the Little Ice Age, Kennedy Glacier extended down to an altitude of 4,314 ft (1,315 m) and was connected to Scimitar Glacier to the south. From about 1850 to 1952, the glacier lost 5,577 ft (1,700 m) of its length. During a cooler and wetter period from 1952 to 1984, Kennedy Glacier advanced 1,050 ft (320 m) but between 1984 and 2005, the glacier again retreated, losing 1,450 ft (440 m) of its length.

== See also ==
- List of glaciers in the United States
