= Vista Glacier =

Glacier in Washington, United States

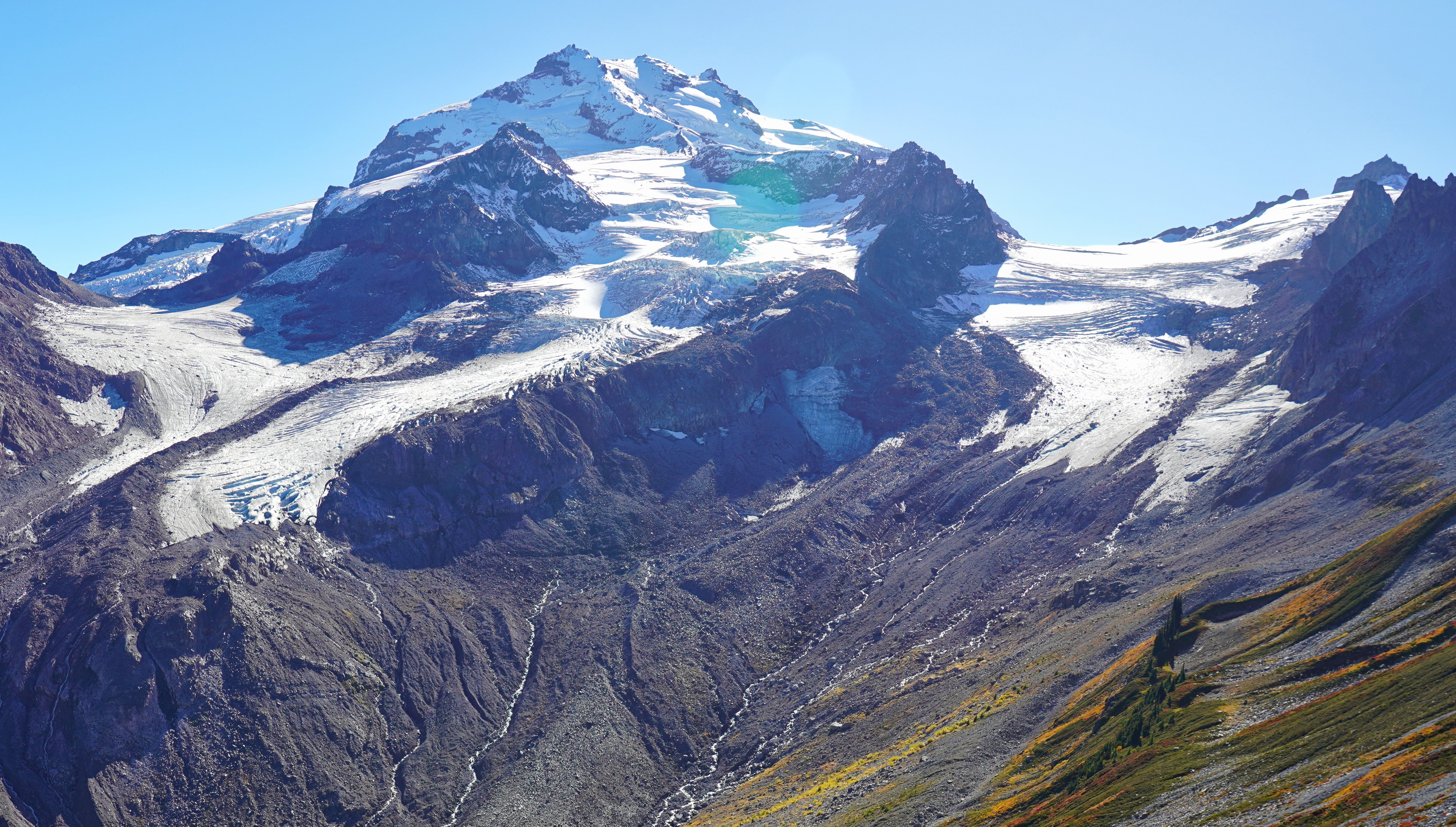
- Vista Glacier (right) from Vista Ridge (Ermine Glacier to left)

- Location within Washington (state)
- Type: Mountain glacier
- Location: Glacier Peak, Snohomish County, Washington, USA
- Coordinates: 48°08′23″N 121°06′44″W
- Length: .90 mi (1.45 km)
- Terminus: Talus
- Status: Retreating

Vista Glacier is located on north slopes of Glacier Peak in the U.S. state of Washington. As is true with all the glaciers found on Glacier Peak, Vista Glacier is retreating. During the Little Ice Age, Vista Glacier extended down to an altitude of 4,412 ft (1,345 m) and was connected to Ermine Glacier to its east. From the end of the Little Ice Age to the mid-1950s, Vista Glacier experienced a general retreat upslope, followed by an advance during a cooler and wetter period until the mid-1970s. From then to 1997, the glacier returned to its previous minimal length recorded in 1946 and the process of retreat is ongoing.

== See also ==
- List of glaciers in the United States
