= Lake Vanda =

Hypersaline lake in Antarctica

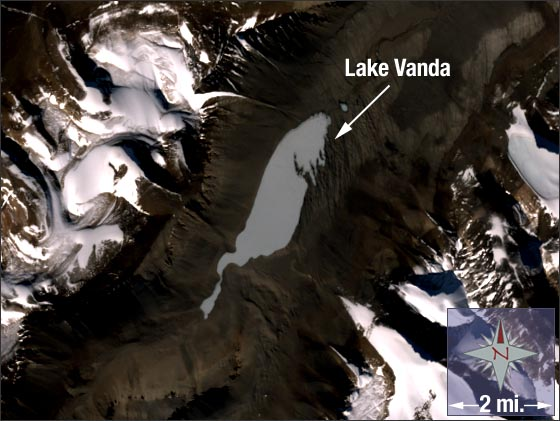
- Landsat 7 image

- Location within Antarctica
- Location: Wright Valley, Victoria Land, Ross Dependency, Antarctica
- Coordinates: 77°31′47″S 161°34′32″E
- Lake type: Endorheic, meromictic, hypersaline
- Primary inflows: Onyx River; Bartley Stream; Clark Stream; Meserve Stream
- Primary outflows: none
- Basin countries: Ross Dependency
- Max. length: 8 km (5.0 mi)
- Max. width: 2 km (1.2 mi)
- Surface area: 5.2 km^{2} (2.0 sq mi)
- Average depth: 30.8 m (101 ft)
- Max. depth: 75 m (246 ft)
- Water volume: 160 million cubic metres (130,000 acre⋅ft)
- Surface elevation: 143 metres (469 ft)
- Settlements: Vanda Station; Lake Vanda Hut

Lake Vanda is a lake in Wright Valley, Victoria Land, Ross Dependency, Antarctica. The lake is 5 km (3.1 mi) long and has a maximum depth of 69 m (226 ft). On its shore, New Zealand maintained Vanda Station from 1968 to 1995. Lake Vanda is a meromictic lake, which means that the deeper waters of the lake do not mix with the shallower waters. It contains an upper layer of cold freshwater to a depth of around 55 metres, below which lies a warm hypersaline layer with a salinity more than ten times that of seawater and more than the salinity of the Dead Sea. There are three distinct layers of water ranging in temperature from 23 °C (73 °F) on the bottom to the middle layer of 7 °C (45 °F) and the upper layer ranges from 4–6 °C (39–43 °F). It is only one of the many saline lakes in the ice-free valleys of the Transantarctic Mountains. The longest river of Antarctica, Onyx River, flows west, inland, into Lake Vanda. There is a meteorological station at the mouth of the river.

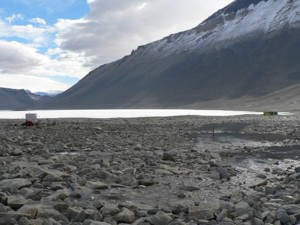
Ice-covered Lake Vanda with Onyx River in the right foreground

The lake is covered by a transparent ice sheet 3.5–4 metres (11–13 ft) year-round, though melting in late December forms a moat out to approximately 50 metres (160 ft) from the shore. The surface of the ice is not covered with snow and is "deeply rutted with cracks and melt lines". During the colder months, the moat refreezes.

While no species of fish live in Lake Vanda or the Onyx River, microscopic life, such as cyanobacteria algal blooms, have been recorded. Due to the concerns over impact to the natural environment that may occur during research, scientific diving operations are limited to work in the upper layer (above 30 metres (98 ft)) and remotely operated underwater vehicle use is not allowed.

== Vanda Station ==
Lake Vanda Station was well known for The Royal Lake Vanda Swim Club. Visitors to Lake Vanda Station could dip into the water when the icecap edge melted out during summer to form a 'moat', and receive a Royal Lake Vanda Swim Club shoulder patch. Vanda staff would assist the melt by hacking out a 'pool'. Many dignitaries and politicians were inducted into the club, The dip had to be naked (Rule 1), complete immersion (Rule 4), witnessed by a 'Vandal' (Vanda Station staffer) and with no restrictions on photography (Rule 6) to qualify. Rule 10 allowed a natural figleaf, but it had to be natural and also naturally green without artificial aid.

Vanda Station was removed in 1995 as lake levels rose, and is replaced by a shelter, Lake Vanda Hut, that is periodically staffed by 2-8 stream researchers.

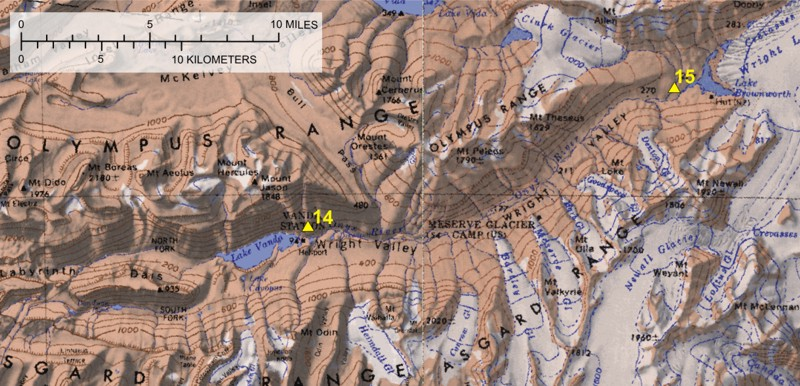
Map of Wright Valley with Onyx River and Lake Vanda
