= Wright Valley =

Geographic feature in Antarctica

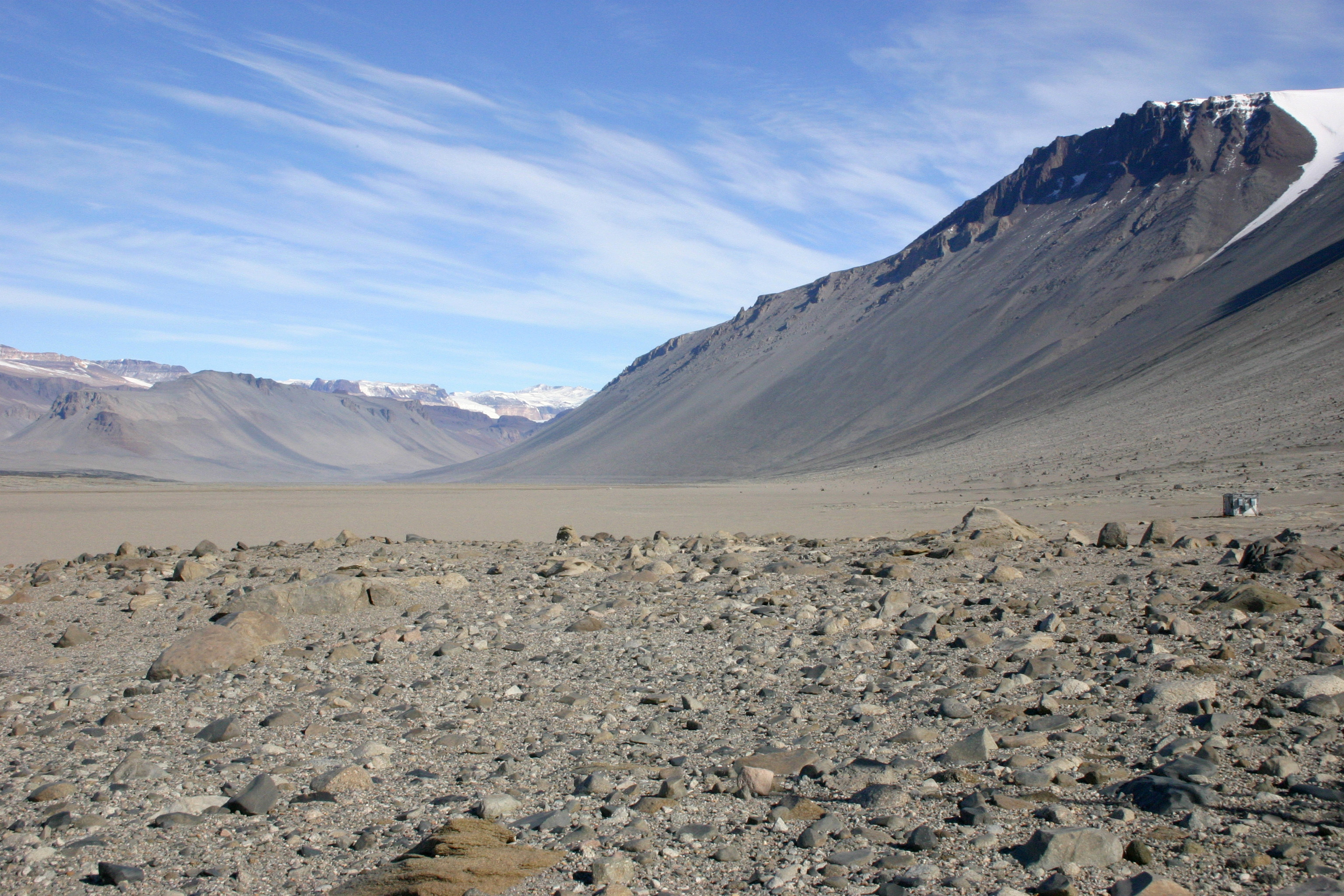
- View west towards Lake Vanda and Dais from the foot of Bull Pass.

Geography
- Location: Antarctica
- Population centers: Vanda Station
- Rivers: Onyx River
- Interactive map of Wright Valley

The Wright Valley is a large east–west trending valley, formerly occupied by a glacier but now ice free except for Wright Upper Glacier at its head and Wright Lower Glacier at its mouth, in Victoria Land, Antarctica. It was named by the VUWAE (1958–59) for Sir Charles Wright, for whom the BrAE (1910–13) named the glacier at the mouth of this valley.

The Wright Valley is the central one of the three large McMurdo Dry Valleys in the Transantarctic Mountains, located west of McMurdo Sound. Wright Valley contains the Onyx River, the longest river in Antarctica, Lake Brownworth, the origin of the Onyx River, and Lake Vanda, which is fed by the Onyx River. Its southwestern branch, South Fork, is the location of Don Juan Pond. The upland area known as the Labyrinth is at the valley's west end.

== Exploration ==
Although portions of the interconnected valley system were discovered in 1903 by the Discovery expedition led by Captain Robert Falcon Scott, the Wright Valley located near the centre of the system was not seen until aerial photographs of the region were made in 1947. By the mid-1960s scientists were becoming increasingly intrigued by the paradoxical fact that the valley lay immediately adjacent to the permanent East Antarctic Ice Sheet, yet had remained ice-free for at least thousands of years. Although Lake Vanda is covered by roughly 3 metres (9.8 ft) of ice year-round, lake temperatures of 25 °C (77 °F) had been reliably measured at a depth of 65 metres (213 ft).

Increasing summer field activity and a clear need to establish a winter record led New Zealand's Antarctic Division and the National Science Foundation of the United States to plan a more permanent base in the valley. In 1968 New Zealand established Vanda Station near the eastern end of Lake Vanda.

== Location ==
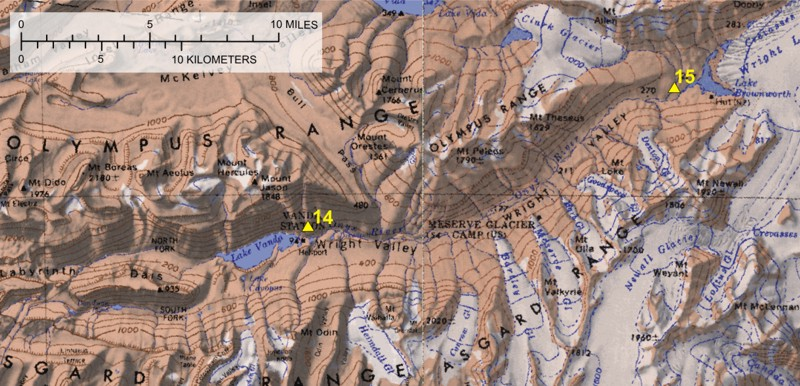
Map of Wright Valley with Onyx River and Lake Vanda.

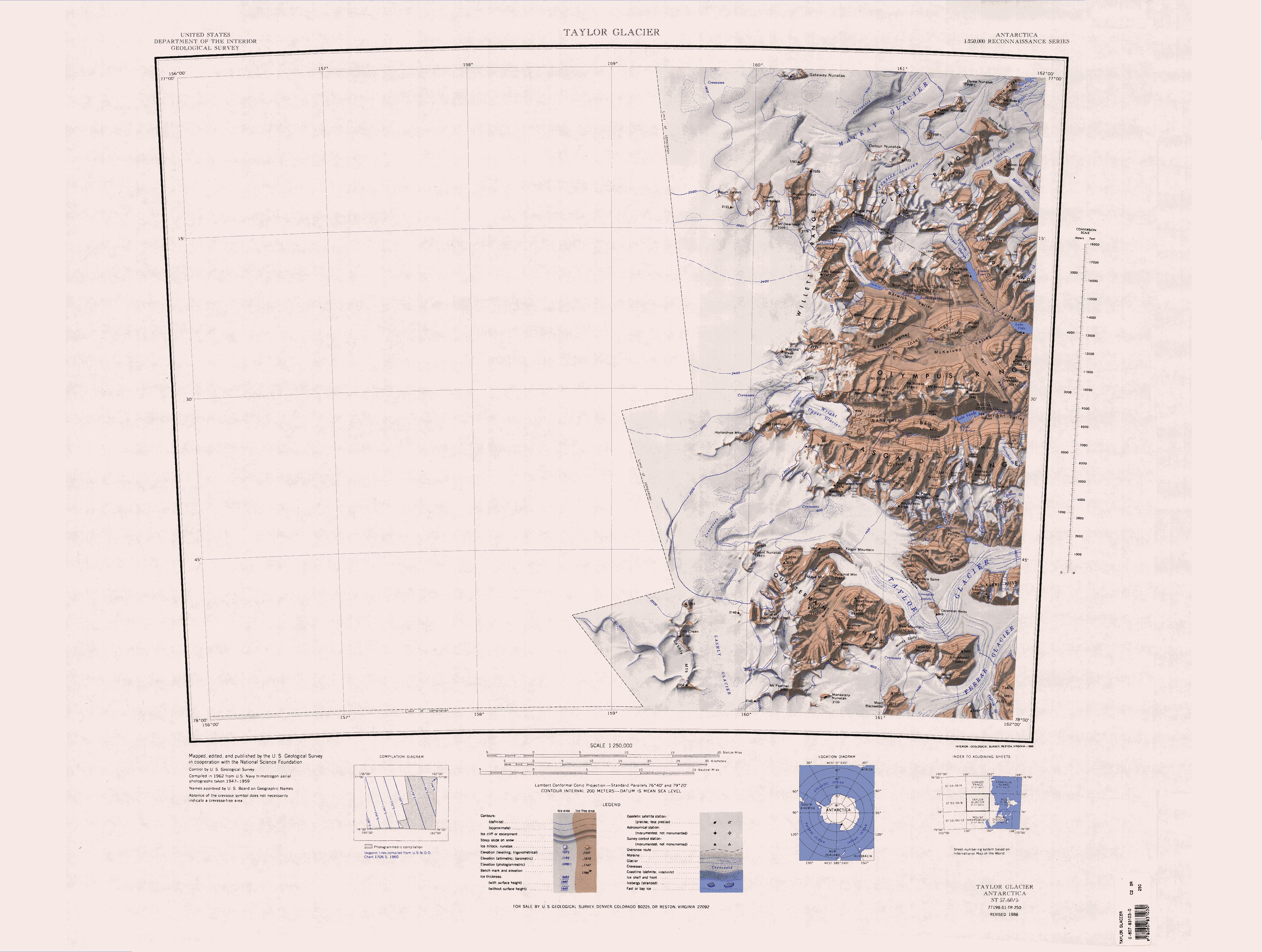
Asgard Range south of center of mapped region. Wright Upper Glacier at west end of the range.

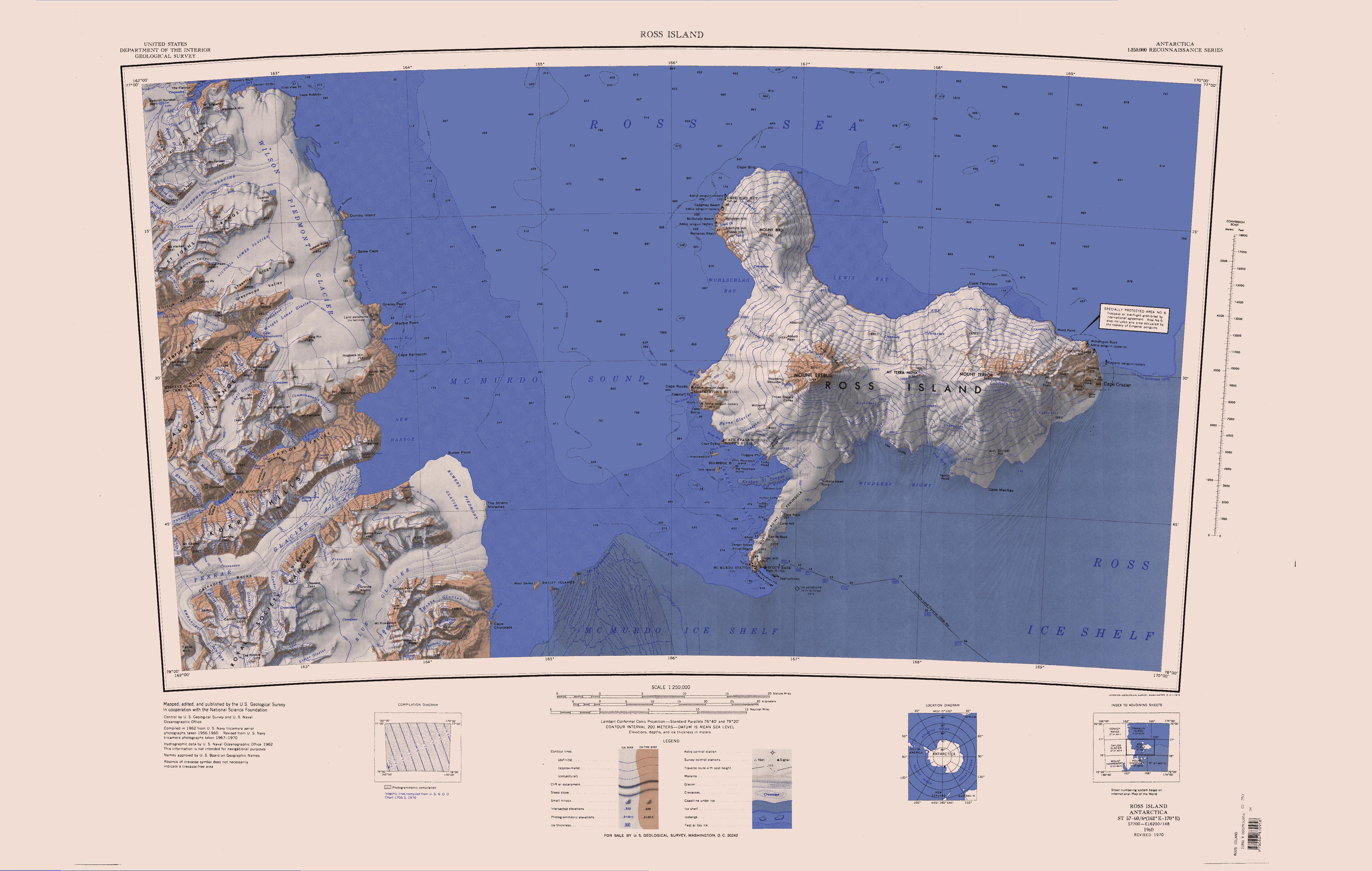
East end of Asgard Range south of center

The Wright Valley is one of the McMurdo Dry Valleys. It runs from Wright Upper Glacier in the west to Wright Lower Glacier to the east. It separates the Olympus Range to the north from the Asgard Range to the south.

== Features ==
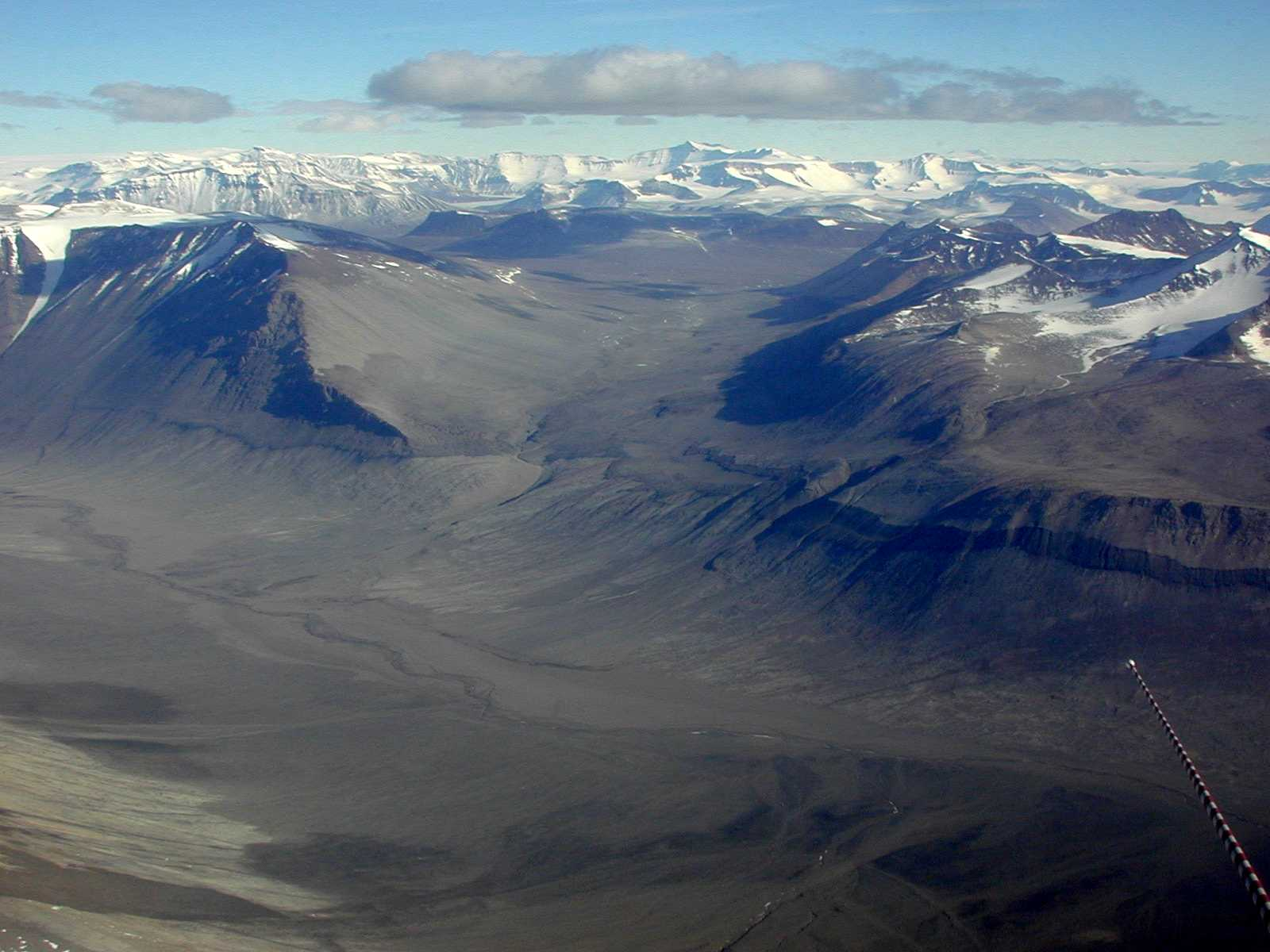
Bull Pass

Features of the valley, from west to east, include the Labyrinth, Don Juan Pond, Dais, North Fork, South Fork, Lake Vanda, Lake Canopus, Onyx River and Lake Brownsworth.

=== Labyrinth ===
77°33′S 160°50′E. An extensive flat upland area which has been deeply eroded at the west end of Wright Valley, in Victoria Land. So named by the VUWAE (1958–59) because the eroded dolerite of which it is formed gives an appearance of a labyrinth.

=== Minotaur Pass ===
77°30′S 160°50′E. A pass, or saddle, at about 1,600 metres (5,200 ft) between Apollo Peak and Mount Electra in the Olympus Range, Victoria Land. The pass permits walking access to Wright Valley from McKelvey Valley. Named by the NZ-APC in 1984 after the Minotaur, in association with names from Greek mythology in the Olympus Range.

=== Dais Col ===
77°33′S 161°03′E. An ice-free col at 600 metres (2,000 ft), connecting the east edge of the Labyrinth and the west edge of the Dais, in Wright Valley, Victoria Land. Named by US-ACAN (1997) in association with the Dais. https://data.aad.gov.au/aadc/gaz/display_name.cfm?gaz_id=124047

=== Dais ===
77°33′S 161°16′E. An elongated mesa between Labyrinth and Lake Vanda in the western part of Wright Valley, in Victoria Land. Descriptively named by the VUWAE, 1958-59.

=== Don Juan Pond ===
77°34′S 161°11′E. A shallow saline pond located south of the Dais in the South Fork of Wright Valley, Victoria Land. The pond was sighted on October 11, 1961 in a field reconnaissance by United States Navy helicopter. In the next three months, a USARP party with George H. Meyer and others made several trips to study the pond. They named it Don Juan Pond for Lieutenants Donald Roe and John Hickey, United States Navy Air Development Squadron Six, who were of assistance to the field party. A new mineral, calcium chloride hexahydrate, was discovered in the pond. The name Antarcticite was proposed for the new mineral.

=== North Fork ===
77°32′S 161°15′E. The northern arm of Wright Valley in Victoria Land. The feature is separated from the South Fork by the Dais. Named by the VUWAE, 1958-59.

=== South Fork ===
77°34′S 161°15′E. The southern arm of Wright Valley in Victoria Land. The feature is separated from the North Fork by the Dais. Named by the VUWAE, 1958-59.

=== Lake Vanda ===
77°32′S 161°33′E. Lake, 3 nautical miles (5.6 km; 3.5 mi) long, just east of the Dais in Wright Valley, Victoria Land. Named by the VUWAE (1958–59) after a dog used by C. Bull, leader of this party, in the British North Greenland Expedition.

=== Lake Bull ===
77°32′S 161°42′E. Small lake 0.5 nautical miles (0.93 km; 0.58 mi) east of Lake Vanda. The name appears to have been applied in the 1960's probably in association with nearby Bull Pass, or for physicist Colin Bull, for whom the pass is named.

=== Lake Canopus ===
77°33′S 161°31′E. A small lake 65 metres (213 ft) above the southern shore of Lake Vanda. Named by the Eighth VUWAE, 1963–64, after Canopus, pilot of Menelaus, the king of Sparta.

=== Onyx River ===
77°32′S 161°45′E. A meltwater stream which flows westward through the Wright Valley from Wright Lower Glacier to Lake Vanda. Mapped and named by the VUWAE, 1958-59.

=== Bull Pass ===
77°28′S 161°42′E. A low pass through the Olympus Range, between Mount Jason and Mount Orestes, joining the McKelvey Valley and the Wright Valley. It was named by the VUWAE (1958–59) for C. Bull, who led this expedition.

=== Lake Brownworth ===
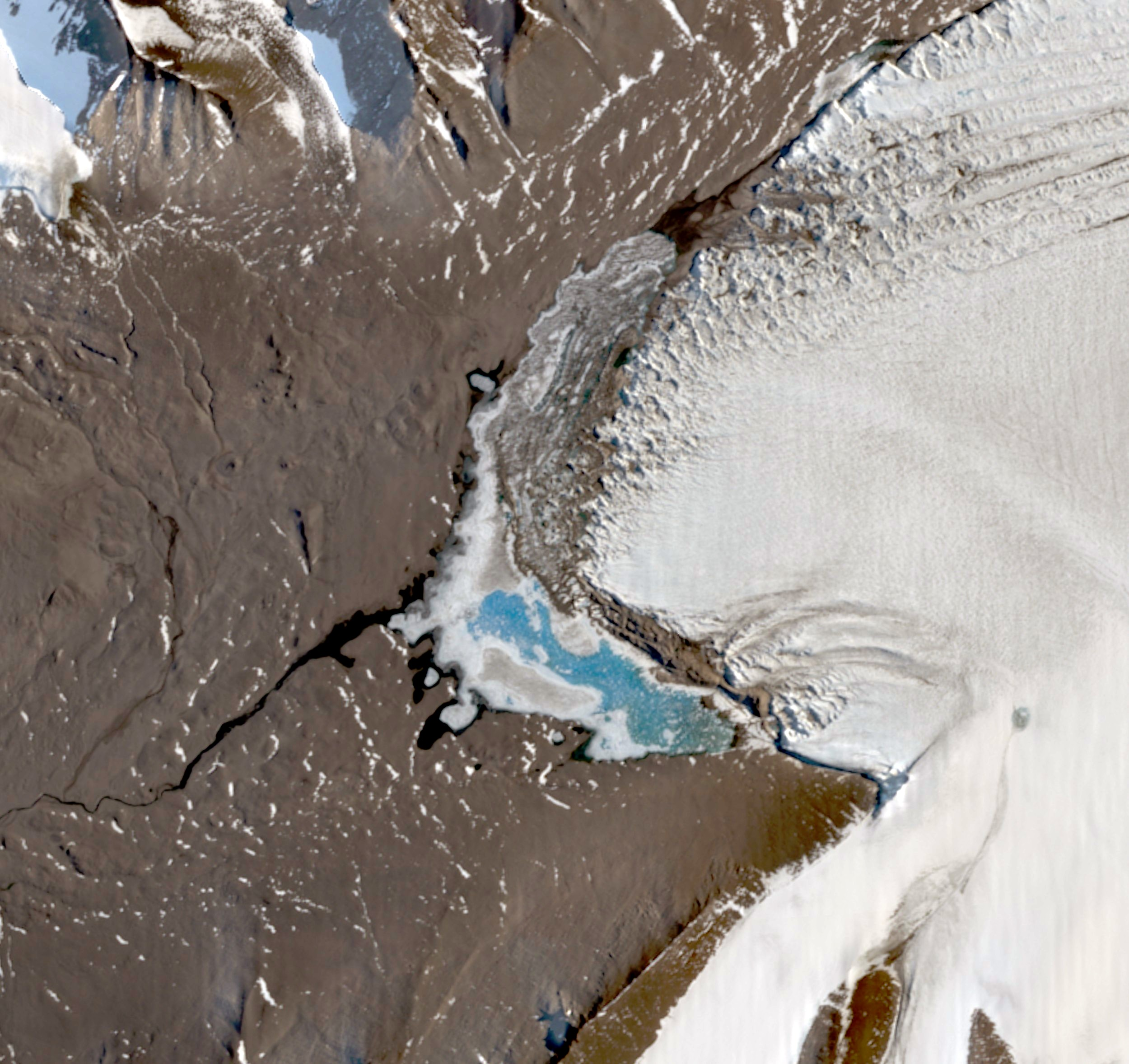
Sentinel-2 image (2022) of Lake Brownworth

77°26′S 162°45′E. A meltwater lake immediately west of Wright Lower Glacier at the east end of Wright Valley. The lake was mapped by USGS from surveys and air photos obtained in 1956-60. Named by US-ACAN for Frederick S. Brownworth, USGS topographic engineer who worked several seasons in Antarctica. In 1970-71 he supervised aerial photography of the dry valleys of Victoria Land, including this lake.

== Tributary valleys and glaciers ==
Tributary valleys and hanging glaciers entering from the Asgard Range, from west to east, include Donner Valley, Sykes Glacier, Odin Valley, Heimdall Glacier, Bartley Glacier, Meserve Glacier, Hart Glacier, Goodspeed Glacier and Denton Glacier.

=== Donner Valley ===
77°37′S 161°27′E. A small, mainly ice-free valley located north-northeast of Mount Thundergut in the Asgard Range. Named by the NZ-APC, presumably in association with nearby Mount Thundergut, "donner" being a German word for "thunder."

=== Sykes Glacier ===
77°35′S 161°32′E. A north-flowing glacier located just east of Plane Table in the Asgard Range. Named by NZ-APC for N.Z. film director Jeremy Sykes who perished in a helicopter accident at nearby Mount McLennan, Nov. 19, 1969.

=== Heimdall Glacier ===
77°35′S 161°50′E. A small glacier just east of Siegfried Peak and Siegmund Peak on the south side of Wright Valley. The name, given by NZ-APC, is one in a group derived from Norse mythology, Heimdall being the warden of Asgard.

=== Valhalla Glacier ===
77°34′S 161°58′E. A small glacier in the Asgard Range located between Mount Valhalla and Conrow Glacier. It flows part way down the north wall of the range toward Wright Valley. Named by US-ACAN and NZ-APC in consultation.

=== Conrow Glacier ===
77°34′S 162°07′E. A small glacier, next westward of Bartley Glacier, that drains north from Asgard Range partway down the south wall of Wright Valley. Named by Roy E. Cameron, leader of a USARP biological party to the area in 1966-67, for Howard P. Conrow, a member of that party.

=== Bartley Glacier ===
77°32′S 162°13′E. A hanging glacier on the south wall of Wright Valley, just west of Meserve Glacier. Named by US-ACAN for construction driver Ollie Barrett Bartley, United States Navy, who was killed on January 14, 1957, when the vehicle (weasel) he was driving dropped through the sea ice at Hut Point, McMurdo Sound.

=== Meserve Glacier ===
77°31′S 162°17′E. A hanging glacier on the south wall of Wright Valley, between the Bartley and Hart Glaciers. Named by United States geologist Robert Nichols for William Meserve, geological assistant to Nichols at nearby Marble Point in the 1959-60 field season.

=== Hart Glacier ===
77°30′S 162°23′E. A small hanging glacier on the south wall of Wright Valley, between the Meserve and Goodspeed Glaciers. Named by United States geologist Robert Nichols for Roger Hart, geological assistant to Nichols at nearby Marble Point in the 1959-60 field season.

=== Goodspeed Glacier ===
77°29′S 162°27′E. A small hanging glacier on the south wall of Wright Valley, between the Hart and Denton Glaciers. Named by United States geologist Robert Nichols after Robert Goodspeed, geological assistant to Nichols at nearby Marble Point in the 1959-60 field season.

=== Denton Glacier ===
77°29′S 162°36′E. A small hanging glacier which drains the northwest slopes of Mount Newall and terminates on the south wall of Wright Valley. Named by United States geologist Robert Nichols for George Denton, geological assistant to Nichols at nearby Marble Point in the 1958-59 field season.

=== Pukeko Pond ===
77.484849°S 162.571882°E. A pond, 0.25 nautical miles (0.46 km; 0.29 mi) long, between Mount Loke and the west side of Denton Glacier. Named by the New Zealand Geographic Board (NZGB) (1998) after a New Zealand water bird.

=== Martin Cirque ===
77.466667°S 162.666667°E. A prominent cirque, 1.9 nautical miles (3.5 km; 2.2 mi) northwest of Mount Newall, Asgard Range, which occupies the south wall of Wright Valley between Denton Glacier and Nichols Range. The cirque is 1 nautical mile (1.9 km; 1.2 mi) wide and its floor, 850 metres (2,790 ft) elevation, is nearly ice free. Named by Advisory Committee on Antarctic Names (US-ACAN) (1997) after Craig J. Martin, who had 10 years involvement in Antarctic construction and engineering projects at Siple, South Pole, and McMurdo Stations and various field camps in McMurdo Dry Valleys from 1977; from 1989, Director, Engineering, Antarctic Support Associates (ASA), with responsibility for the management of engineering, construction, and facilities maintenance efforts that directly support United States scientific research in Antarctica.

== See also ==
- McMurdo Dry Valleys § Geology
- Taylor Valley (south)
- Victoria Valley (north)

== Sources ==
- Alberts, Fred G., ed. (1995), Geographic Names of the Antarctic (PDF) (2 ed.), United States Board on Geographic Names This article incorporates public domain material from websites or documents of the United States Board on Geographic Names.
- Harrowfield, David L. (2005), Vanda Station, History of an Antarctic Outpost, New Zealand Antarctic Society, ISBN 0-473-06467-7
- "Martin Cirque", Geographic Names Information System, United States Geological Survey, United States Department of the Interior
- "Pukeko Pond", Geographic Names Information System, United States Geological Survey, United States Department of the Interior
- Ross Island, USGS: United States Geological Survey
- Taylor Glacier, USGS: United States Geological Survey

This article incorporates public domain material from websites or documents of the United States Geological Survey.

77°31′S 161°50′E
