= List of rivers of Antarctica =

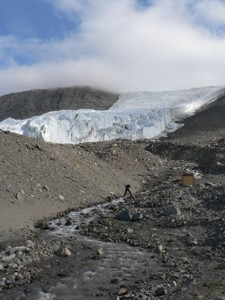
Antarctic melt stream

This is a list of rivers of Antarctica. Although they are variously named rivers, creeks or streams, due to the climate of the region, those listed are technically all meltwater streams.

== List ==
Overview of waterways in Antarctica
Name of River	GPS Coordinates	Comments
Adams Stream	78°6′S 163°45′E	A glacial meltwater stream, 800 metres (2,600 ft) long. It flows from the snout of Adams Glacier into Lake Miers in Miers Valley, Denton Hills, Scott Coast. Named in association with Adams Glacier.
Aiken Creek	77°36′S 163°17′E	A glacial meltwater stream in Taylor Valley, Victoria Land, which flows north from the unnamed glacier west of Wales Glacier to Many Glaciers Pond, then west to Lake Fryxell. The feature is 6 kilometres (3.7 mi) long and receives some tributary flow from Wales Glacier. The name was suggested by hydrologist Diane McKnight, leader of the United States Geological Survey (USGS) team which made extensive studies of the hydrology and geochemistry of streams and ponds in the Lake Fryxell basin, 1987–1994. Named after USGS hydrologist George R. Aiken, a member of the field team in three summer seasons, 1987–1991, who assisted in establishing stream gauging stations on the streams flowing into Lake Fryxell in the 1990–91 season.
Alph River	78°12′S 163°45′E	The Alph River is a small river in Antarctica, running into Walcott Bay, Victoria Land. It is in an ice-free region at the west of the Koettlitz Glacier, Scott Coast. The Alph emerges from Trough Lake and flows through Walcott Lake, Howchin Lake, and Alph Lake. It ends in a subglacial flow beneath Koettlitz Glacier to McMurdo Sound.
Jemmi Creek	63°51′42.6″S 57°57′37.6″W	A meltwater stream in the Abernethy Flats, James Ross Island, with multiple sources, including the main James Ross Island ice cap and a smaller cap east of the river's estuary. In April 2014, Cooper Millman measured the length of the river's tributaries to be 10.3 kilometres (6.4 mi), the second longest on the continent, from the main ice cap to Brandy Bay, a shallow bay with two large islands. The tributary he measured passes through an unnamed large pond.
Lawson Creek	77°43′S 162°16′E	A glacial meltwater stream, 400 metres (1,300 ft) long, flowing southeast from the southwest tip of Rhone Glacier (Antarctica) to the northwest corner of Lake Chad in Taylor Valley, Victoria Land. Named by Advisory Committee on Antarctic Names (US-ACAN) in 1996 after Wendy Julia Lawson, glaciologist, University of Canterbury, New Zealand, leader of an expedition that studied glacial processes on Taylor Glacier during the 1992 and 1993 summer seasons.
Onyx River	77.5333°S 161.567°E	A glacial meltwater stream, also the longest river in Antarctica, at 32 kilometres (20 mi) long.
Priscu Stream	77°39′S 162°45′E	A glacial meltwater stream, 3.8 kilometres (2.4 mi) long, flowing southwest from southeast end of Lacroix Glacier to the northeast end of East Lake Bonney in Taylor Valley, Victoria Land. It is also fed from Solls Glacier (via Bohner Stream), and by Doran Stream (3 kilometres [1.9 mi]), and flows through Spiegel Pond. Named by Advisory Committee on Antarctic Names (US-ACAN) in 1996 after John C. Priscu, ecologist, Montana State University; principal investigator from 1984 on numerous studies of marine and fresh water systems in the McMurdo region and the author of numerous papers on the ecology of this area; led first WINFLY expedition (1991) into the McMurdo Dry Valleys.
Rezovski Creek	62°38′28″S 60°21′57″W	A glacial meltwater stream, 500 metres (1,600 ft) long, draining that portion of the northwestern slope of Balkan Snowfield located between Hesperides Hill, Atlantic Club Ridge, Krum Rock and Sinemorets Hill in eastern Livingston Island. The arms of Rezovski Creek encompass the old buildings of the Bulgarian Base. Its lower course forms the Grand Lagoon, and has its mouth at the southwest extremity of Bulgarian Beach used as embarkation place servicing St. Kliment Ohridski Base. Named on 29 October 1996 after Rezovska River in southeastern Bulgaria; the name was established in use at the time of approval.
Surko Stream	77°25′S 163°44′E	A glacial meltwater stream, 1.6 kilometres (0.99 mi) south of Gneiss Point on the coast of Victoria Land. It issues from the front of Wilson Piedmont Glacier and flows eastward to Arnold Cove. The stream was studied by Robert L. Nichols, geologist for Metcalf and Eddy, Engineers, Boston, MA, which made engineering studies here under contract to the U.S. Navy in the 1960–61 season. Named by Nichols for Lieutenant Alexander Surko, U.S. Navy, second-in-command of the Navy party that worked on the aircraft landing strip close north of this stream.
