= Keble Hills =

Mountain range in Antarctica

- Location within Antarctica

Geography
- Continent: Antarctica
- Region: Victoria Land
- Range coordinates: 77.994296°S 164.14803°E

The Keble Hills (77.994296°S 164.14803°E) are an imposing line of granite hills rising to 1,300 metres (4,300 ft), including from west to east Murphy Peak, Handley Hill, Auger Hill and Coral Hill. The hills separate Salmon Glacier and Garwood Valley in the Denton Hills of Victoria Land, Antarctica. They were named by the New Zealand Geographic Board (NZGB) in 1994 after William Keble Martin, a New Zealand botanist who surveyed plants of New Zealand and the sub-Antarctic.

== Features ==
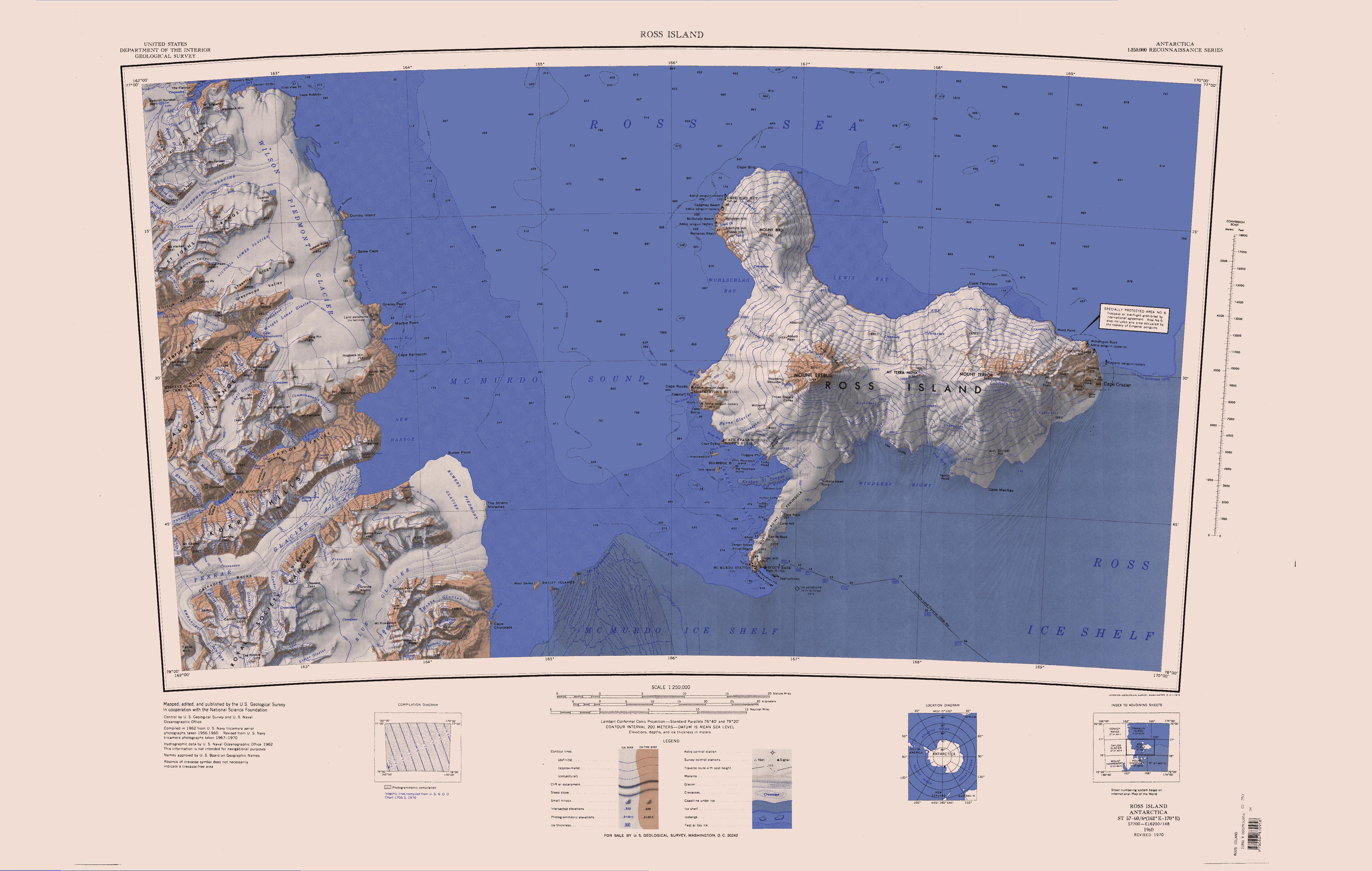
Keble Hills south of Salmon Glacier, beside McMurdo Sound, in extreme south of map

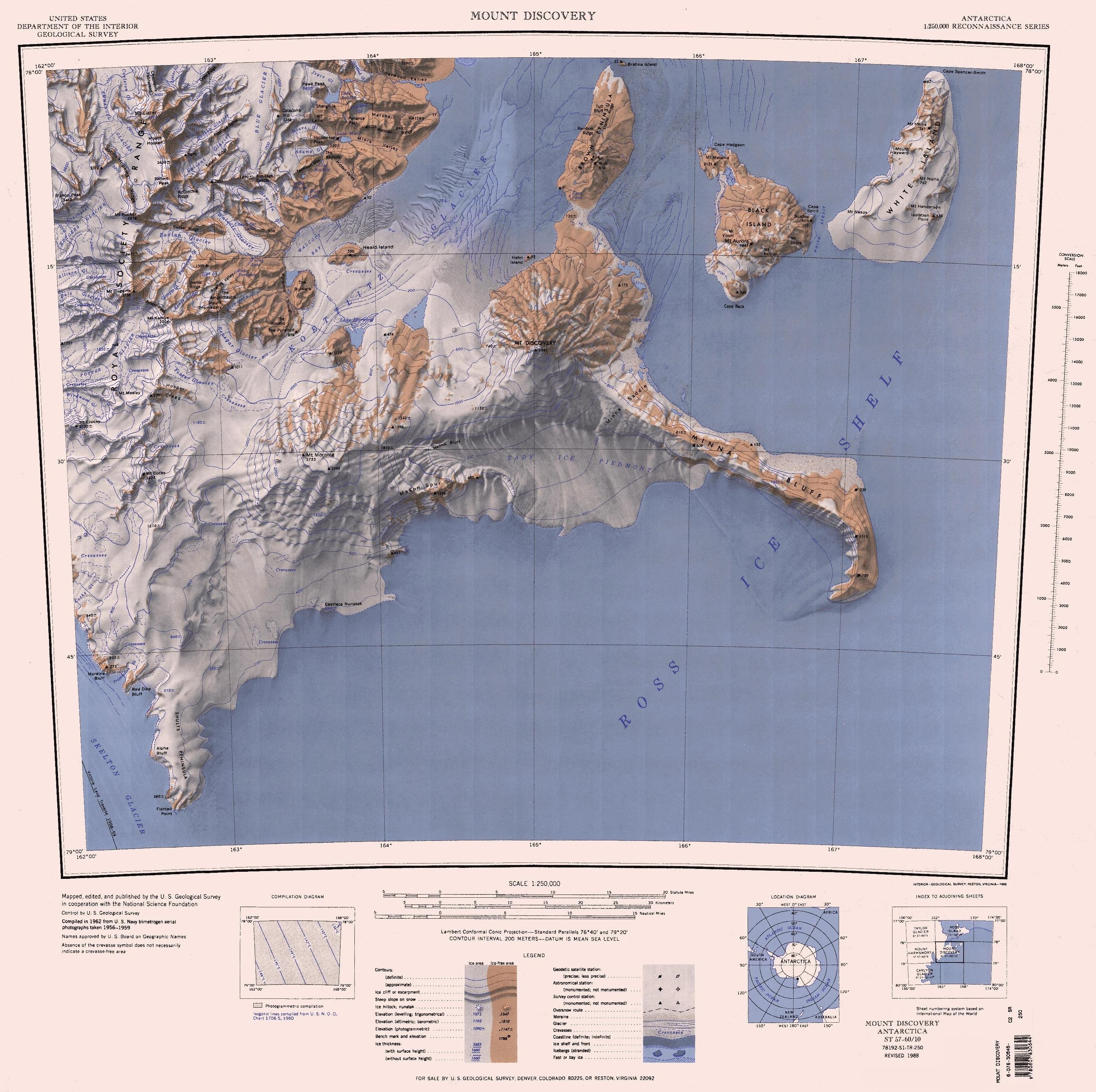
Keble Hills above Garwood Valley in extreme north of map

=== Murphy Peak ===
77°59′S 164°04′E. A prominent, partly ice-covered peak, 1,280 metres (4,200 ft) high, standing at the south side of Salmon Glacier, 2.7 nautical miles (5.0 km; 3.1 mi) southwest of Haggerty Hill, on the Scott Coast. Named by the United States Advisory Committee on Antarctic Names (US-ACAN) in 1992 after Robert L. Murphy of Holmes and Narver, Inc., manager of the support contractor to the United States Antarctic Program, 1976-80 and 1990-92; responsible for integrating operations of the Hero/Palmer Station System and the Continental System (resulting in shared logistics and engineering capabilities) and for preparation of the McMurdo Station Long-Range Development Plan used to modernize infrastructure, 1980-92.

=== Handley Hill ===
78.010782°S 164.211871°E. A peak 1,009 metres (3,310 ft) high standing 0.6 nautical miles (1.1 km; 0.69 mi) west of Auger Hill. Named by the NZGB (1994) after W.R.C. Handley, Ph.D. supervisor to New Zealand Antarctic biologist Laurence Greenfield.

=== Auger Hill ===
78.009398°S 164.265337°E. A peak which rises to 1,000 metres (3,300 ft) high between Handley Hill and Coral Hill. Named by the NZGB in 1994. Shallow soil deposits occur on the summit; an auger was used to obtain deep samples.

=== Coral Hill ===
78.006884°S 164.297957°E. A peak rising to about 850 metres (2,790 ft) high elevation 0.5 nautical miles (0.93 km; 0.58 mi) east of Auger Hill. The descriptive name, applied by the NZGB 1994, is suggested by the delicate rock shapes resembling filmy reef corals that have been created by years of wind erosion.

== Sources ==
- Alberts, Fred G., ed. (1995), Geographic Names of the Antarctic (PDF) (2 ed.), United States Board on Geographic Names This article incorporates public domain material from websites or documents of the United States Board on Geographic Names.
- "Auger Hill", Geographic Names Information System, United States Geological Survey, United States Department of the Interior
- "Coral Hill", Geographic Names Information System, United States Geological Survey, United States Department of the Interior
- "Handley Hill", Geographic Names Information System, United States Geological Survey, United States Department of the Interior
- "Keble Hills", Geographic Names Information System, United States Geological Survey, United States Department of the Interior

This article incorporates public domain material from websites or documents of the United States Geological Survey.
