= Streptomyces hypolithicus =

Scientific classification
- Domain: Bacteria
- Kingdom: Bacillati
- Phylum: Actinomycetota
- Class: Actinomycetes
- Order: Streptomycetales
- Family: Streptomycetaceae
- Genus: Streptomyces
- Species: S. hypolithicus

Binomial name
- Streptomyces hypolithicus Le Roes-Hill et al. 2009

Type strain
- DSM 41950, HSM#10, NRRL B-24669

Species of bacterium

Streptomyces hypolithicus is a filamentous bacterium species from the genus of Streptomyces which has been isolated from soil from Miers Valley in the McMurdo Dry Valleys in Eastern Antarctica.

== See also ==
- List of Streptomyces species
