= Denton Hills =

- Location within Antarctica

Geography
- Continent: Antarctica
- Region: Victoria Land
- Range coordinates: 78.0833333°S 163.9166667°E

The Denton Hills (78.0833333°S 163.9166667°E) are a group of rugged foothills, 24 nautical miles (44 km; 28 mi) long southwest–northeast and 9 nautical miles (17 km; 10 mi) wide, to the east of the Royal Society Range on the Scott Coast, Victoria Land, Antarctica.

The Denton Hills comprise a series of eastward-trending ridges and valleys circumscribed by Howchin Glacier, Armitage Saddle, Blue Glacier, the coast, and Walcott Bay. The highest summits, Mount Kowalczyk at 1,703 metres (5,587 ft), and Goat Mountain at 1,634 metres (5,361 ft), rise from Hobbs Ridge in the northern part of the foothills. Elevations decrease southward as in Kahiwi Maihao Ridge, 1,045 metres (3,428 ft) high near the center of the group and the Xanadu Hills, 820 metres (2,690 ft) high at the southern end. The principal glaciers (Hobbs, Blackwelder, Salmon, Garwood, Joyce, Rivard, Miers, Adams, Ward) flow east but have receded, leaving several dry valleys.

== Exploration ==
The Denton Hills were discovered and roughly mapped by the British National Antarctic Expedition, 1901–04, under Robert Falcon Scott. The hills were mapped in detail by United States Antarctic Research Program (USARP) and New Zealand Antarctic Research Programme (NZARP) personnel in the years following the International Geophysical Year, 1957–58.

== Name ==
The hills were named by the United States Advisory Committee on Antarctic Names (US-ACAN; 1999) after Professor George H. Denton of the Department of Geological Sciences and the Institute for Quaternary Studies, University of Maine, who conducted geological research in the Transantarctic Mountains and Victoria Land (including work in these hills), 1958–99, making more than 25 visits to Antarctica. Denton Glacier is also named after him.

== Major features ==
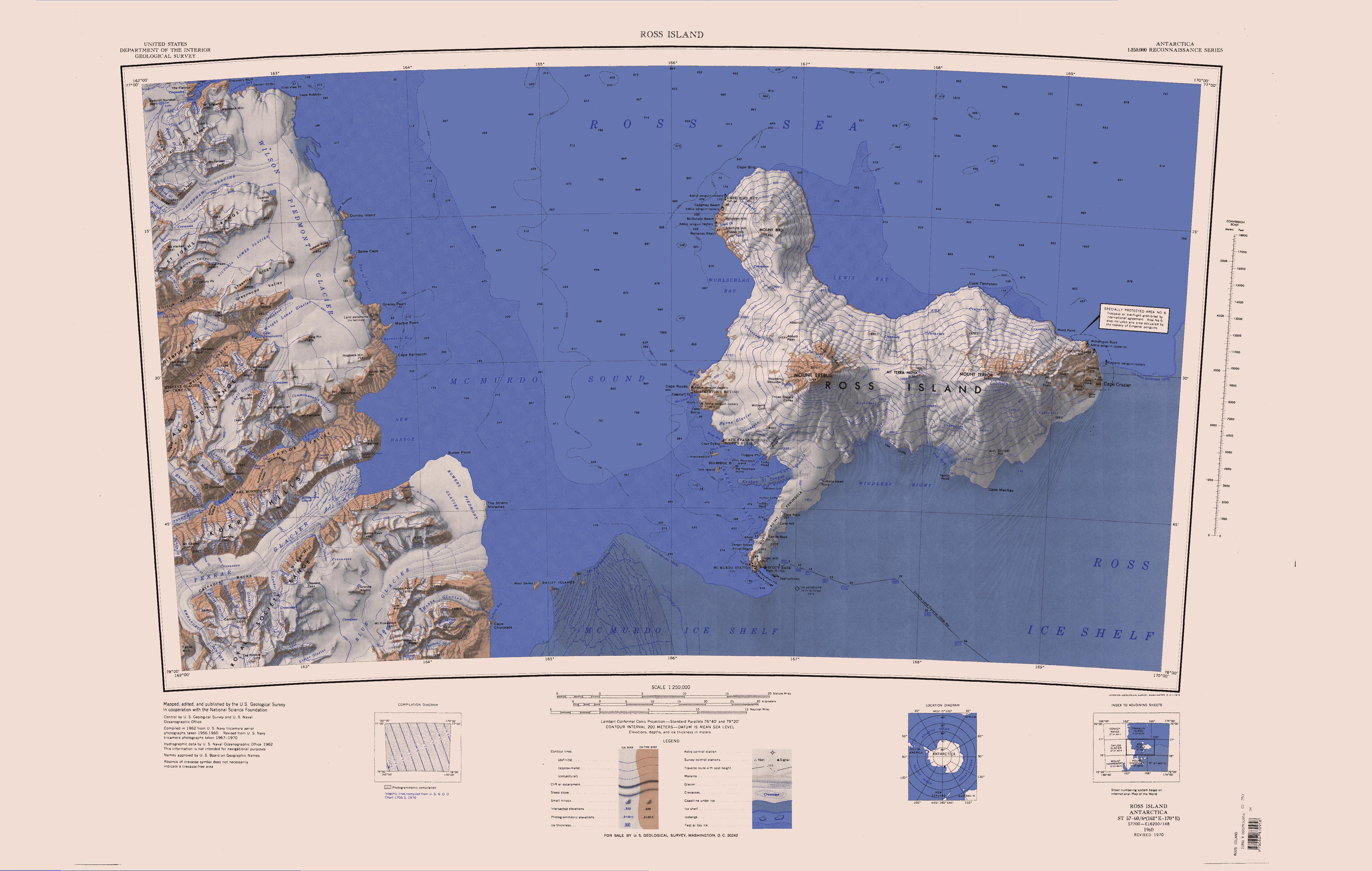
Denton Hills south of Blue Glacier, beside McMurdo Sound, in south of map

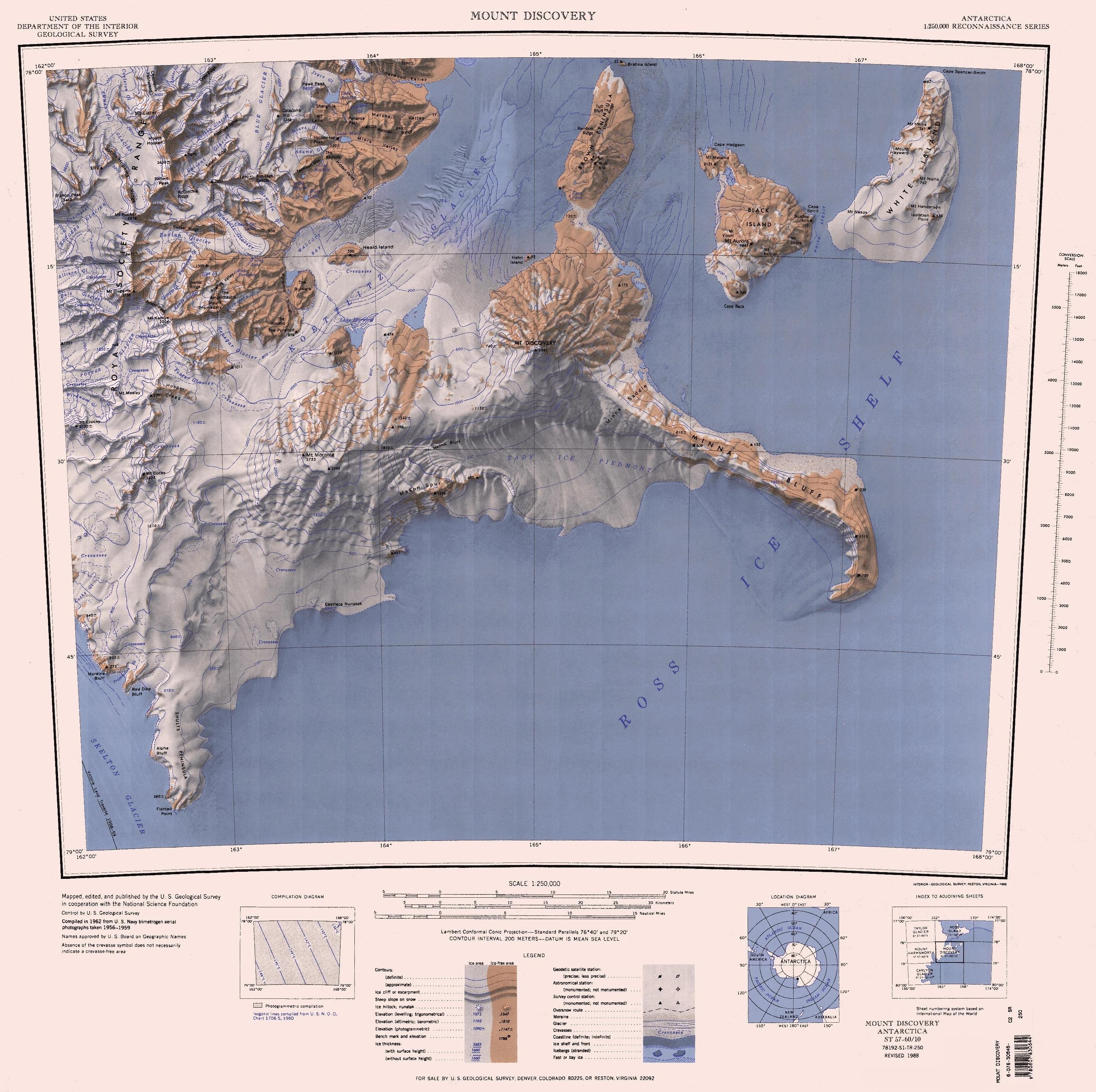
Denton Hill to the north of map, above Heald Island

Major features include, from north to south:

- Hobbs Ridge 77°53′S 163°58′E, a prominent arc-shaped ridge which circumscribes Hobbs Glacier to the north and northwest and forms the divide with the lower part of Blue Glacier, on the Scott Coast of Victoria Land, Antarctica.
- Keble Hills 77.994296°S 164.14803°E, an imposing line of granite hills rising to 1,300 metres (4,300 ft), including from west to east Murphy Peak, Handley Hill, Auger Hill and Coral Hill. The hills separate Salmon Glacier and Garwood Valley.
- Garwood Valley 78°2′S 164°7′E is a valley opening on the coast of Victoria Land, just south of Cape Chocolate. It is largely ice-free but is occupied near its head by Garwood Glacier.
- Péwé Peak 78°2′S 163°40′E, a bedrock peak, 860 metres (2,820 ft) high, composed of granite and topped with a dolerite sill. The peak is immediately south of Joyce Glacier and is surrounded by glacial ice except on the south side.
- Marshall Valley 78°4′S 164°12′E, a small valley in Antarctica, ice free except for Rivard Glacier at its western head. It is 12.5 kilometres (7.8 mi) long, and 3 kilometres (1.9 mi) wide, and lies between Garwood Valley and Miers Valley.
- Miers Valley 78°6′S 164°0′E, a valley just south of Marshall Valley and west of Koettlitz Glacier. The valley is ice-free except for Miers Glacier in its upper (western) part and Lake Miers near its center.
- Hidden Valley 78°10′S 163°52′E, the ice-free valley next south of Miers Valley through which an alpine glacier formerly moved to coalesce with Koettlitz Glacier. The mouth of the valley is completely blocked by the Koettlitz moraine, the only one of the numerous valleys tributary to the Koettlitz isolated in this fashion. The main valley is hidden not only from the coast but from most of the surrounding ridges.
- Ward Valley 78.1666667°S 163.6166667°E, an ice-free valley that lies between Porter Hills and Xanadu Hills and east of the snout of Ward Glacier.
- Alph River 78.2°S 163.75°E, a small river, flowing in summertime, on the northern side of Koettlitz Glacier. It rises from Koettlitz ice at the upper end of Pyramid Trough and from south to north includes Pyramid Ponds, Trough Lake, Walcott Lake, Howchin Lake, and Alph Lake.

== Sources ==
- Alberts, Fred G., ed. (1995), Geographic Names of the Antarctic (PDF) (2 ed.), United States Board on Geographic Names This article incorporates public domain material from websites or documents of the United States Board on Geographic Names.
- "Alph River", Geographic Names Information System, United States Geological Survey, United States Department of the Interior
- "Denton Hills", Geographic Names Information System, United States Geological Survey, United States Department of the Interior
- "Keble Hills", Geographic Names Information System, United States Geological Survey, United States Department of the Interior
- "Ward Valley", Geographic Names Information System, United States Geological Survey, United States Department of the Interior

This article incorporates public domain material from websites or documents of the United States Geological Survey.
