= Ward Valley =

Ice-free valley in Antarctica

- Location within Antarctica

Geography
- Location: Antarctica
- Coordinates: 78.1666667°S 163.6166667°E
- Interactive map of Ward Valley

Ward Valley (78.1666667°S 163.6166667°E) is an ice-free valley that lies between Porter Hills and Xanadu Hills and east of the snout of Ward Glacier in the Denton Hills, Scott Coast, Antarctica. Named by Advisory Committee on Antarctic Names (US-ACAN; 1994) in association with Ward Glacier and Ward Lake.

== Location ==
Ward Valley is in the Denton Hills. It is one of the McMurdo Dry Valleys. It lies between Hidden Valley to the northeast and Howchin Glacier to the southwest. It opens into the Koettlitz Glacier to the southeast.

== Features ==
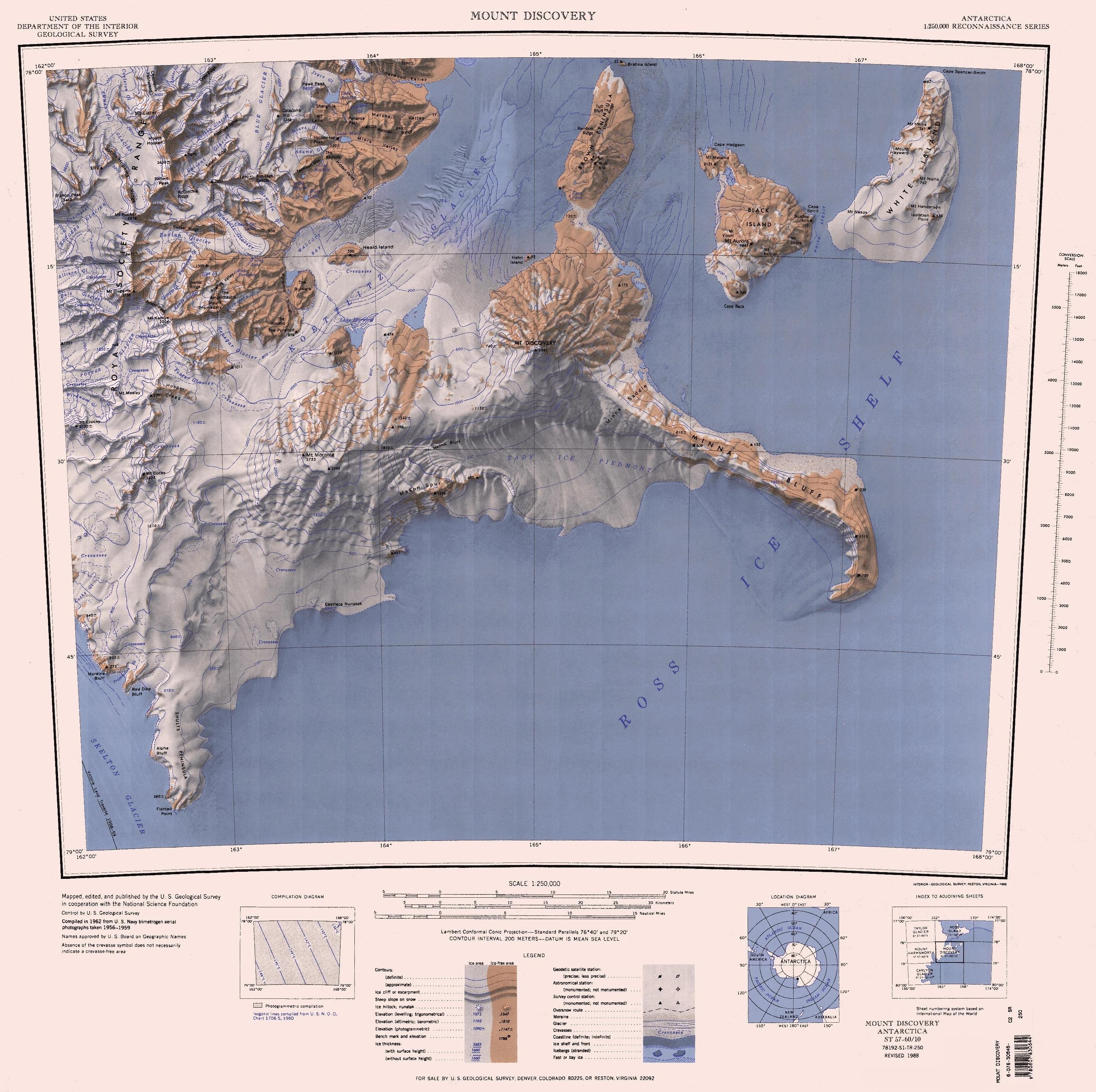
Ward Valley in north of map

=== Ward Glacier ===
78°10′S 163°27′E. Small glacier between Terminus Mountain and Howchin Glacier on the east side of the Royal Society Range in Victoria Land. Named by Taylor of the British Antarctic Expedition, 1910–13 (BrAE) for L. Ward, a Tasmanian geologist.

=== Ward Stream ===
78.1833333°S 163.7°E. A meltwater stream from the Ward Glacier. It flows eastward through Ward Valley and Ward Lake into Alph Lake. Named by New Zealand Geographic Board (NZGB) (1994) in association with Ward Glacier and Ward Lake.

=== Ward Lake ===
78°10′S 163°35′E. A small lake, formed at the snout of the Ward Glacier, on the east side of the Royal Society Range in Victoria Land. Named by the BrAE (1910–13) after Ward Glacier.

=== Porter Hills ===
78.15805°S 163.64499°E. A series of ice-free hills which rise to 931 metres (3,054 ft) in Wilson Hill and extend west-east between Hidden Valley and Ward Valley. Named by US-ACAN (1994) after Raymond C. Porter, Electronics Technician, USCG, a crewman of United States Coast Guard Cutter (USCGC) Glacier, who was killed in an offloading accident at McMurdo Station, February 8, 1979.

=== Wilson Hill ===
78.16189°S 163.69957°E. An ice-free hill at 931 metres (3,054 ft) standing 1.5 kilometres (0.93 mi) southwest of Janosy Hill, in the Porter Hills, Scott Coast. Named by US-ACAN (1994) after Terry J. Wilson, a geologist with the Byrd Polar Research Center geological party in Victoria Land, 1989-90. Royal Society Range, 1991–92, a principal investigator in United States Antarctic Project (United States ArmyP) Transantarctic Mountains deformation network research over several field seasons through 2005-06.

=== Janosy Hill ===
78.15°S 163.7333333°E. A hill rising to 913 metres (2,995 ft) high just west of Mirabilite Pond in the Porter Hills. Named by US-ACAN (1994) after Robert J. Janosy, a geologist with the Byrd Polar Research Center geological field party to the Royal Society Range, 1991-92.

=== Xanadu Hills ===
78.1833333°S 163.5333333°E. A ridge of hills lying between Ward Valley and the Alph River. Named by New Zealand Geographic Board (NZGB) in 1994 in connection with the adjacent Alph River, an earlier name inspired by the 1816 work Kubla Khan by English poet Samuel Taylor Coleridge. The name Xanadu used in the poem is an archaic romanisation of Shangdu, the summer capital of Kublai Khan's Yuan dynasty in China.

== Sources ==
- Alberts, Fred G., ed. (1995), Geographic Names of the Antarctic (PDF) (2 ed.), United States Board on Geographic Names This article incorporates public domain material from websites or documents of the United States Board on Geographic Names.
- "Denton Hills", Geographic Names Information System, United States Geological Survey, United States Department of the Interior
- "Janosy Hill", Geographic Names Information System, United States Geological Survey, United States Department of the Interior
- Mount Discovery, USGS: United States Geological Survey
- Porter Hills, AADC: Australian Antarctic Data Centre
- "Ward Stream", Geographic Names Information System, United States Geological Survey, United States Department of the Interior
- "Ward Valley", Geographic Names Information System, United States Geological Survey, United States Department of the Interior
- Wilson Hill, AADC: Australian Antarctic Data Centre
- "Xanadu Hills", Geographic Names Information System, United States Geological Survey, United States Department of the Interior

This article incorporates public domain material from websites or documents of the United States Geological Survey.
