= Bohner =

Bohner (also Boehner) is a surname of German origin. Notable people with the surname include:

== People ==
- Gerd Bohner (born 1959), German scientist
- John Boehner (born 1949), American politician
- Kate Bohner (born 1967), American journalist and writer
- Philotheus Boehner (1901–1955), German scholar and member of the Franciscan order

== Fictional characters ==
- Ralph Bohner, character in the Marvel Cinematic Universe, introduced in the miniseries WandaVision

== See also ==
- Bohner Stream, river of Antarctica
