= The Keyhole =

The Keyhole may refer to:

== Cinema ==
- The Keyhole (1933 film)

== Places ==
- The Keyhole (Antarctica), a defile in Victoria Land.
- The Keyhole (Longs Peak), a rock gap on Longs Peak, Colorado, United States.
- The Keyhole (Mount Darwin), a rock gap on Mount Darwin, California, United States.
