= George H. Denton =

American geologist

George H. Denton (born 14 December 1939 in Medford, Massachusetts, USA) is a professor of Geological Sciences and Quaternary Studies at the University of Maine.

== Biography ==
Denton earned his Ph.D. at the Yale University in 1965, and was the first scientist from the University of Maine elected to the National Academy of Sciences. His primary interest is the geological history of large ice sheets and smaller mountain glaciers, and in particular the role of these ice sheets in Quaternary and late-Tertiary ice ages. He also focuses on the abrupt ocean-atmosphere reorganizations in glacial cycles. One current project (2015) deals with the Quaternary and late Tertiary history of the Antarctic Ice Sheet. Studies of late Quaternary glacial deposits elucidate the role of the Antarctic Ice Sheet during the last few ice ages. Studies of late Tertiary deposits bear on fundamental climatic changes that preceded Quaternary ice ages. Recent projects involved reconstruction of Northern Hemisphere ice sheets during the last ice age. Another project deals with the alpine glacier history of the Chilean Andes. He led a party of scientists doing field studies in Chile in 1991–99, and in New Zealand in 2000–08 together with his close colleague throughout his career, the late Norwegian Quaternary geologist Professor Bjørn G. Andersen of the University of Oslo.

Denton has been widely acclaimed for his research in glacial geology and the Denton Glacier and the Denton Hills in Antarctica were named in his honor. In 1990, he received the prestigious Vega Medal (Gold) from the Swedish Society for Anthropology and Geography and in 1996 he was elected to the Royal Swedish Academy of Sciences. Denton's research has inspired several generations of students, many of whom have picked up researching in Earth Science.

== Honors ==
- 1990: Recipient of the Vega Medal (Gold) from the Swedish Society for Anthropology and Geography
- 1996: Elected to the Royal Swedish Academy of Sciences
- 2002: Elected to the National Academy of Sciences
