= Doran Stream =

Meltwater stream

Doran Stream (77°42′S 162°36′E) is a meltwater stream, 3 kilometres (2 mi) long, flowing north from Doran Glacier east of Sollas Glacier to Priscu Stream in Taylor Valley, Victoria Land. It was named by the Advisory Committee on Antarctic Names in 1996 after Peter Doran, a paleolimnologist currently an endowed chair at Louisiana State University, who has conducted studies of the paleolimnology and climate of the McMurdo Dry Valleys since 1993.
