= Bohner Stream =

Meltwater stream in Antarctica

Bohner Stream (77°42′S 162°34′E) is a meltwater stream, 3,000 metres (3,300 yd) long, flowing north from the south end of Sollas Glacier to Priscu Stream in Taylor Valley, Victoria Land. It was named by the Advisory Committee on Antarctic Names in 1996 after Lieutenant Commander Robert T. (Beez) Bohner, U.S. Navy, helicopter pilot, Squadron VXE-6, who flew Antarctic missions from 1986; was liaison with the National Science Foundation, 1989–91; and organized the first spring (WINFLY) helicopter flights to McMurdo Dry Valleys in 1991.
