= Hidden Valley (Antarctica) =

Ice-free valley in Antarctica

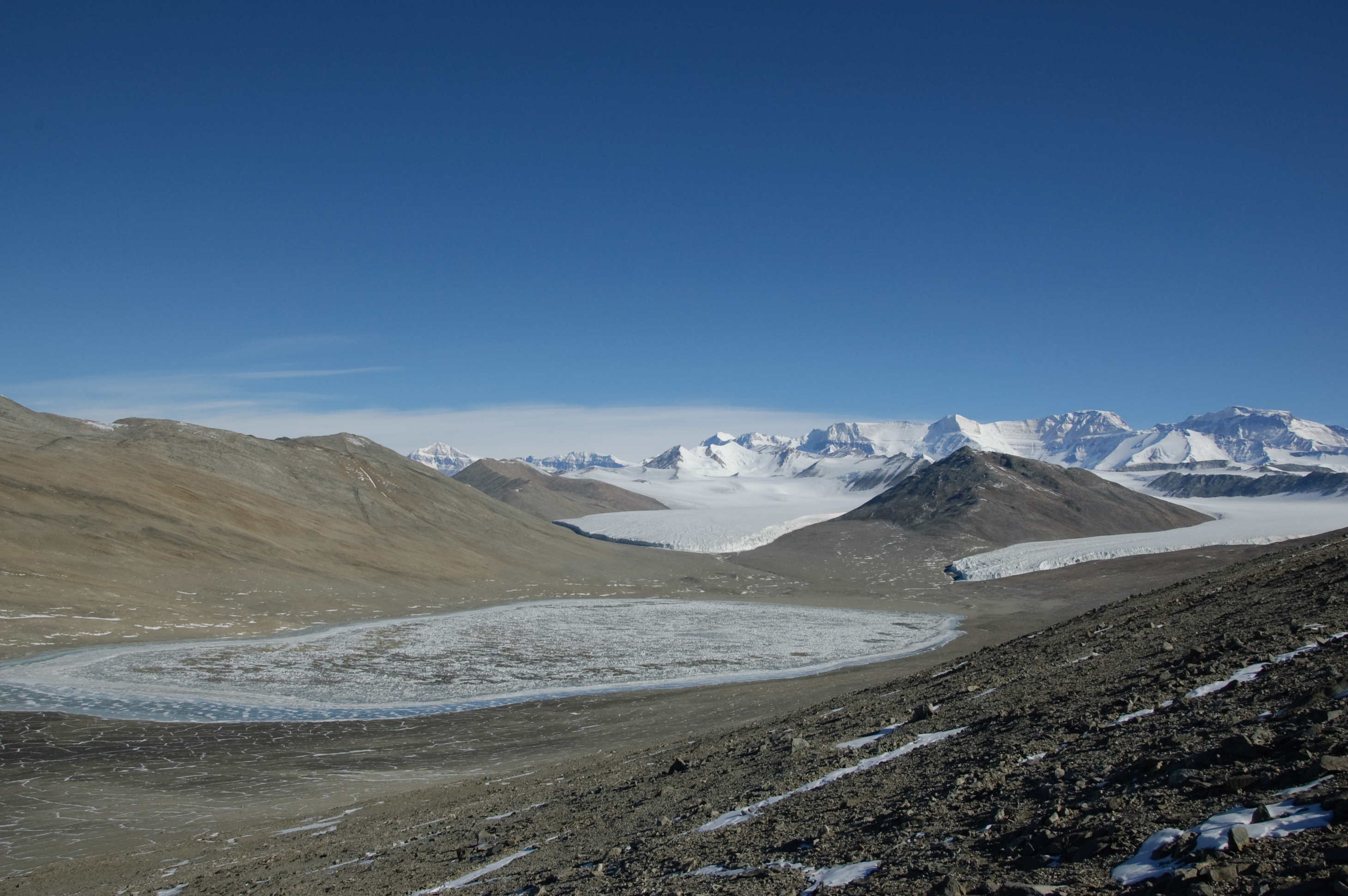
- Upper Miers Valley. Adams glacier on the left and Miers glacier on the right

- Location within Antarctica

Geography
- Location: Antarctica
- Coordinates: 78°10′S 163°52′E
- Interactive map of Hidden Valley

Hidden Valley (78°10′S 163°52′E) is the ice-free valley next south of Miers Valley through which an alpine glacier formerly moved to coalesce with Koettlitz Glacier. The mouth of the valley is completely blocked by the Koettlitz moraine, the only one of the numerous valleys tributary to the Koettlitz isolated in this fashion. The main valley is hidden not only from the coast but from most of the surrounding ridges. The valley was traversed during December and January by the New Zealand Victoria University of Wellington Antarctic Expedition (VUWAE) 1960-61 who applied the name.

== Location ==
Hidden Valley is in the Denton Hills. It is one of the McMurdo Dry Valleys. It lies to the southwest of Miers Valley, southeast of Adams Glacier and northwest of Ward Glacier. The valley opens onto the Koettlitz Glacier to the southeast.

== Features ==
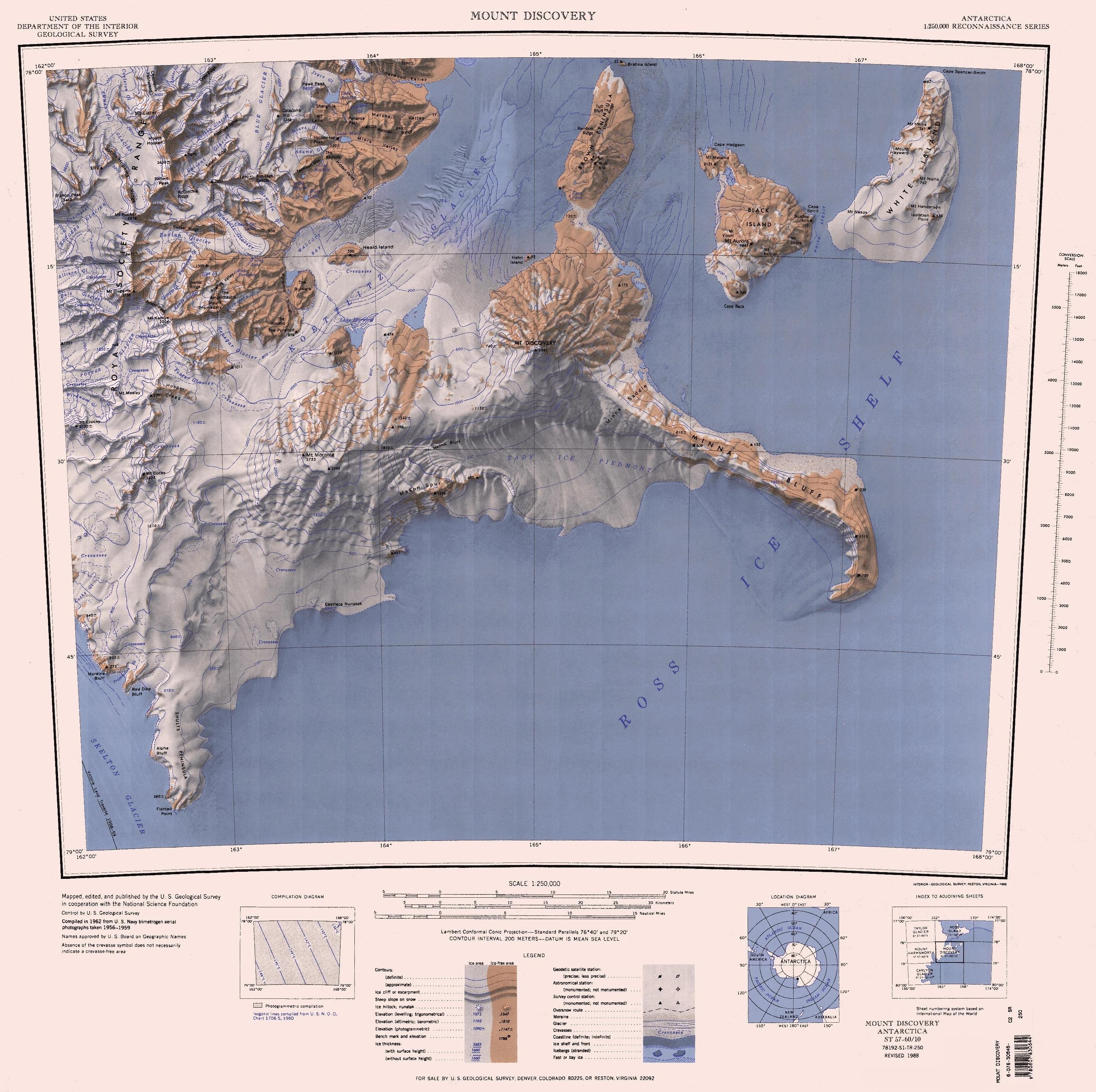
Hidden Valley in north of map

=== The Keyhole ===
78°07′S 163°41′E. A narrow ice-carved slot, or defile, between the Adams Glacier and Hidden Valley. It provides the only low-level entrance to Hidden Valley, and is the key to easy passage between Lake Miers and Ward Glacier. Named by the New Zealand VUWAE who used it on several occasions during the summer of 1960-61.

=== Lake Keyhole ===
78°08′S 163°41′E. A very small lake on the south, or Hidden Valley side of The Keyhole. Named by the New Zealand VUWAE, 1960-61, because of its proximity to The Keyhole.

=== Mirabilite Pond ===
78°11′S 163°56′E. An alkali pond at a high elevation in the southern part of Hidden Valley. The pond is located on the northern side of the ridge that bounds the southeast part of Hidden Valley. The feature was studied by United States geologist Troy L. Péwé (1957-58) whose finding of a thin film of white salt mirabilite (Glauber's salt) around the edge of the pond suggested the name.

== Sources ==
- Alberts, Fred G., ed. (1995), Geographic Names of the Antarctic (PDF) (2 ed.), United States Board on Geographic Names This article incorporates public domain material from websites or documents of the United States Board on Geographic Names.
- "Denton Hills", Geographic Names Information System, United States Geological Survey, United States Department of the Interior
- Mount Discovery, USGS: United States Geological Survey

This article incorporates public domain material from websites or documents of the United States Geological Survey.
