= Marshall Valley =

Valley in Victoria Land, Antarctica

- Location within Antarctica

Geography
- Location: Antarctica
- Coordinates: 78°4′S 164°12′E
- Interactive map of Marshall Valley

Marshall Valley (78°4′S 164°12′E) is a small valley in Antarctica, ice free except for Rivard Glacier at its western head. It is 12.5 kilometres (7.8 mi) long, and 3 kilometres (1.9 mi) wide, and lies between Garwood Valley and Miers Valley on the coast of Victoria Land. It is one of the McMurdo Dry Valleys. The valley is open to the Ross Sea to the east.

== Name ==
Marshall Valley was named by the New Zealand Blue Glacier Party (1956–1957) for Dr. Eric Marshall, surgeon and cartographer of the British Antarctic Expedition (BrAE; 1907–09), who accompanied Ernest Shackleton on his journey to within 97 nautical miles (180 km; 112 mi) of the South Pole.

== Features ==
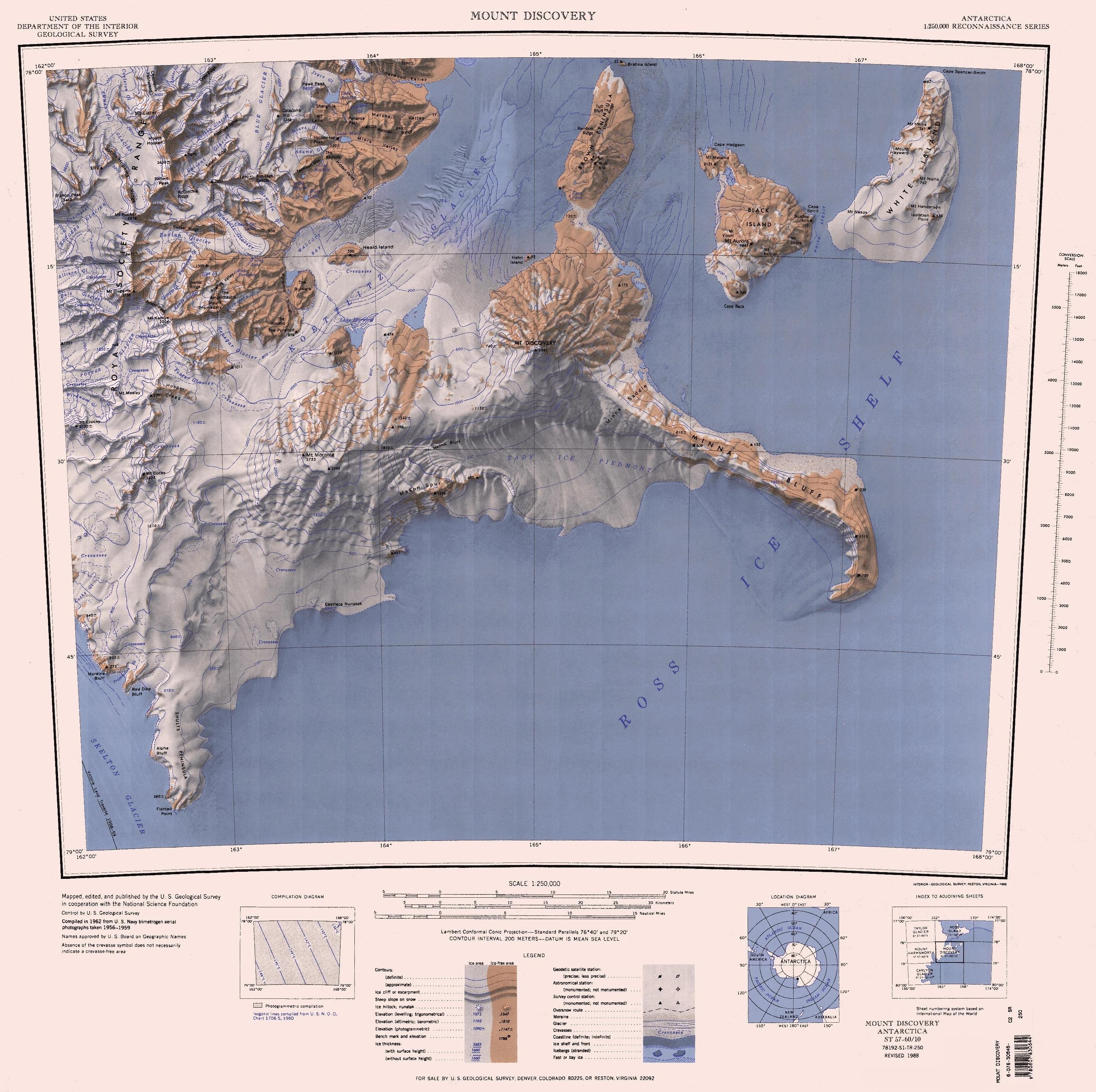
Marshall Valley in north of map

=== Marshall Ridge ===
78°03′S 164°05′E. A ridge to the east of Blue Glacier on Scott Coast, Victoria Land, running east–west and rising to about 1,175 metres (3,855 ft) high between Garwood Valley and Marshall Valley. The feature was almost surely observed in 1903 by the Koettlitz Glacier party led by Lieutenant A. B. Armitage of the British National Antarctic Expedition (BrNAE), but it was first clearly mapped by Captain Robert F. Scott's second expedition, BrAE, 1910–1913. The ridge was named in association with Marshall Valley by the New Zealand Antarctic Place-Names Committee (NZ-APC) in 1982.

=== Rivard Glacier ===
78°04′S 163°55′E. A glacier about 1 nautical mile (1.9 km; 1.2 mi) long at the head of Marshall Valley. The glacier was observed and mapped by Troy L. Péwé, glacial geologist with United States Navy Operation Deep Freeze, 1957–1958. It was named by Péwé for Norman Rivard who was his assistant on this expedition.

=== Marshall Stream ===
78°04′S 164°18′E. A meltwater stream about 6 nautical miles (11 km; 6.9 mi) long that flows through the Marshall Valley from the Rivard Glacier to the Koettlitz Glacier. The stream was observed by Troy L. Péwé, glacial geologist with United States Navy Operation Deep Freeze, 1957–1958. The name was applied by the NZ-APC and United States Advisory Committee on Antarctic Names (US-ACAN) in consultation, and derives from its location in Marshall Valley.

=== DeMaster Point ===
78.068953°S 164.423965°E A point at the foot of Marshall Valley, Denton Hills, on the Scott Coast of Victoria Land. Named by US-ACAN (1994) after Douglas P. DeMaster, biologist, University of Minnesota; who conducted seal studies in 1976 and 1977 (McMurdo Sound), 1977 and 1978 (South Shetland Island), 1978 and 1979 (Palmer Archipelago).

=== Kahiwi Maihao Ridge ===
78.0833333°S 164°E An ice-free ridge near the center of Denton Hills on the Scott Coast of Victoria Land. The ridge rises to 1,075 metres (3,527 ft) high and extends west–east between Marshall Valley and Miers Valley. Named Kahiwi Maihao Ridge by New Zealand Geographic Board (NZGB) in 1994, a Maori name meaning "finger ridge".

== Sources ==
- Alberts, Fred G., ed. (1995), Geographic Names of the Antarctic (PDF) (2 ed.), United States Board on Geographic Names This article incorporates public domain material from websites or documents of the United States Board on Geographic Names.
- "DeMaster Point", Geographic Names Information System, United States Geological Survey, United States Department of the Interior
- "Kahiwi Maihao Ridge", Geographic Names Information System, United States Geological Survey, United States Department of the Interior

This article incorporates public domain material from websites or documents of the United States Geological Survey.
