= Walcott Lake (Antarctica) =

- Location within Antarctica
- Location: Victoria Land, Antarctica
- Coordinates: (78°14′00″S 163°28′00″E)
- Type: lake

Walcott Lake is one of several lakes in the Alph River system, this one located 1.3 nautical miles (2.4 km) east of the snout of Walcott Glacier on the Scott Coast. It was named by the New Zealand Geographic Board in 1994 in association with Walcott Glacier.
