= Doran Glacier =

Glacier in Antarctica

Doran Glacier (77°43′S 162°40′E) is a glacier between Sollas Glacier and Marr Glacier on the north slope of the Kukri Hills, Victoria Land. It was named by the Advisory Committee on Antarctic Names in 1997 from association with Doran Stream, which flows north from this glacier into Taylor Valley.
