= Garwood Valley =

Valley in Antarctica

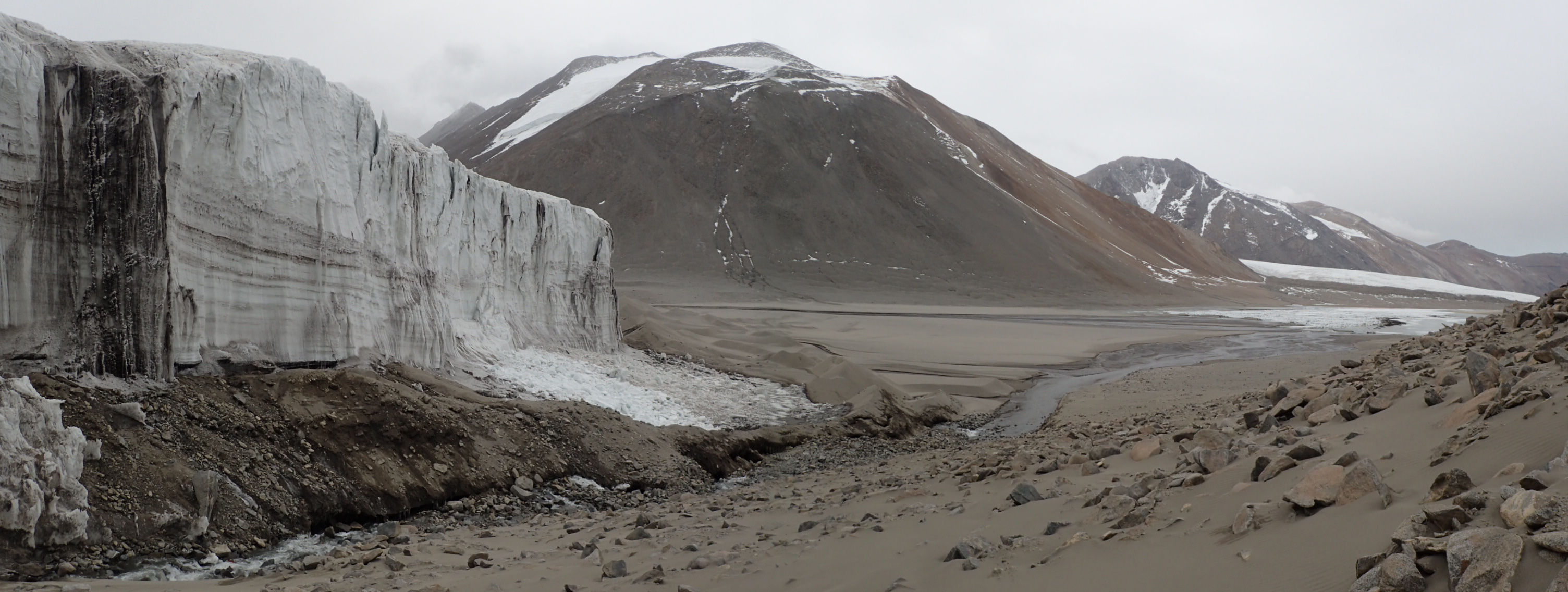
- Upper Garwood Valley

Geography
- Location: Antarctica
- Interactive map of Garwood Valley

Garwood Valley (78°2′S 164°7′E) is a valley opening on the coast of Victoria Land, Antarctica, just south of Cape Chocolate. It is one of the McMurdo Dry Valleys. It is largely ice-free, but is occupied near its head by Garwood Glacier. It was named by Thomas Griffith Taylor of the British Antarctic Expedition, 1910–13 (BrAE), in association with Garwood Glacier.

== Features ==
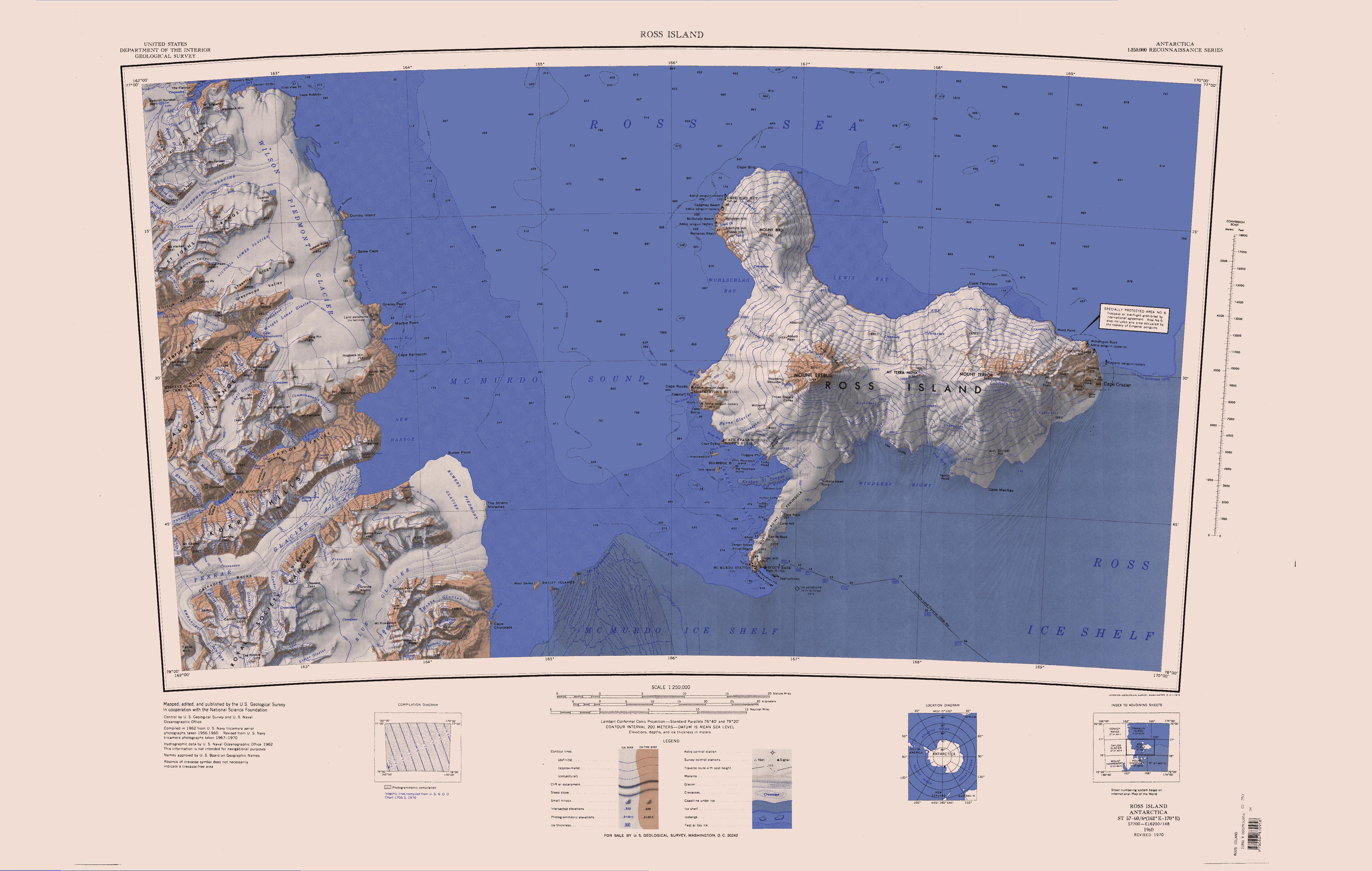
Garwood Glacier southwest of Salmon Glacier, in extreme south of map

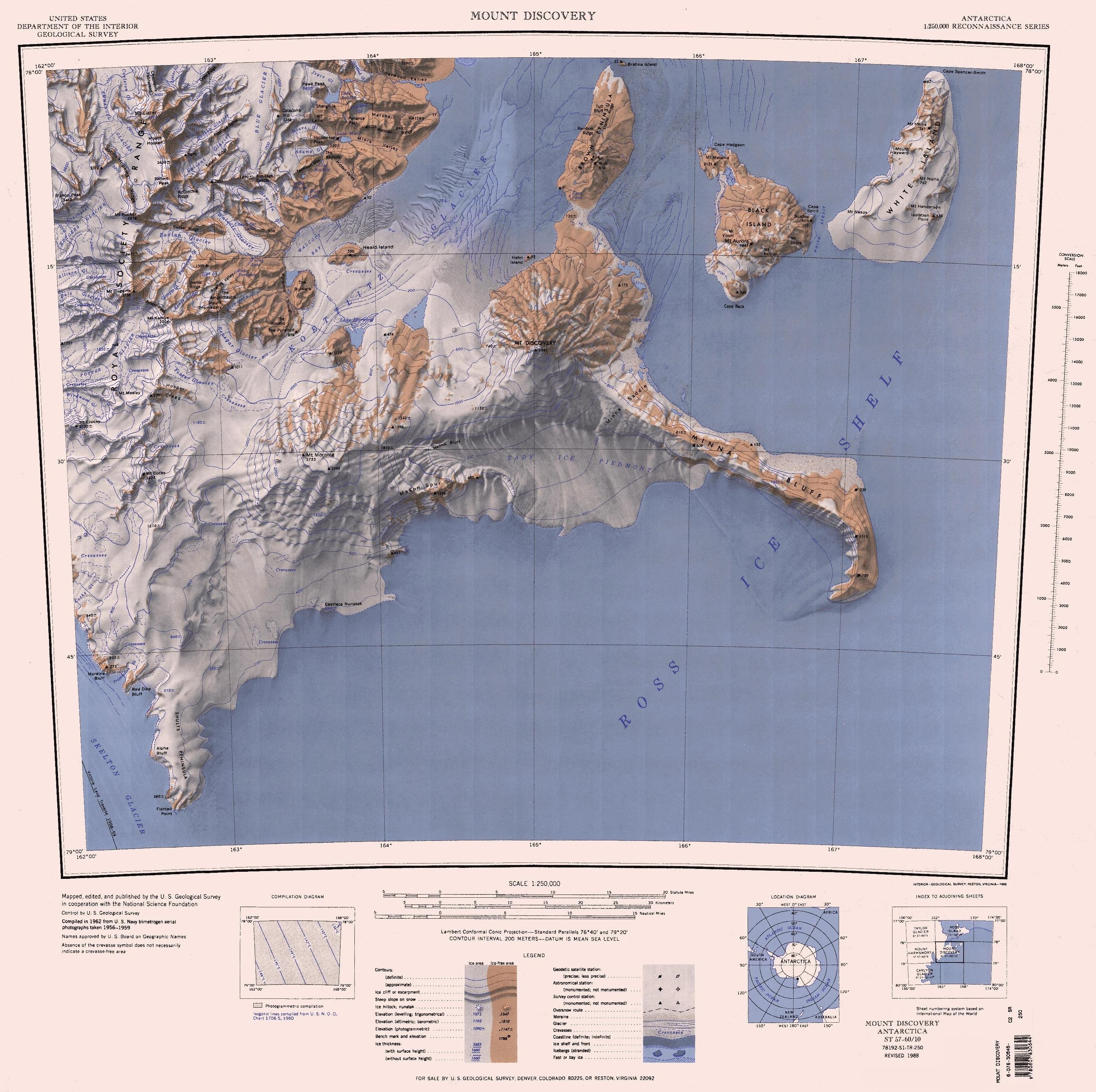
Garwood Valley in extreme north of map

=== Mount Alexandra ===
78.002485°S 163.84375°E. A mountain rising to 1,274 metres (4,180 ft) at the south side of the head of Garwood Glacier. Named by New Zealand Geographic Board (NZGB) after Jane Alexandra (1829-92), an early botanist with an interest in lower plants. Born in Calcutta, she came to New Zealand in 1862.

=== Mount Atholl ===
78.003168°S 163.706365°E. A peak rising to 728 metres (2,388 ft) to the west of Mount Alexandra. Named by NZGB in 1994 after Sarah Atholl (d. 1873), an early New Zealand botanist with an interest in lichens.

=== Garwood Glacier ===
78°01′S 163°57′E. A glacier occupying the northwest part of Garwood Valley. First Mapped by the British National Antarctic Expedition (BrNAE; 1901-04), but not named until 1911. Named by Taylor of the BrAE (1910-13) for Edmund Johnston Garwood, professor of geology and mineralogy at the University of London. Projection Peak at the southwest extremity of Hobbs Ridge rises above the head of Garwood Glacier.

=== Lake Garwood ===
78.033189°S 164.293589°E. A lake at the lower end of Garwood Valley. The lake receives meltwater from Garwood Glacier at the valley head. Named by Griffith Taylor of the BrAE, 1910-13, in association with Garwood Glacier.

=== Burrows Glacier ===
78.034533°S 163.915745°E. A hanging glacier on the south wall of Garwood Valley and opposite the Garwood Glacier in the Denton Hills. The glacier provides the water and nutrients for the existence of Nostoc beds below. Named by the New Zealand Geographic Board (NZGB) (2002) after Emeritus Professor Colin Burrows, sometime teacher in the Department of Plant and Microbial Sciences, University of Christchurch, New Zealand.

== Sources ==
- Alberts, Fred G., ed. (1995), Geographic Names of the Antarctic (PDF) (2 ed.), United States Board on Geographic Names This article incorporates public domain material from websites or documents of the United States Board on Geographic Names.
- "Burrows Glacier", Geographic Names Information System, United States Geological Survey, United States Department of the Interior
- "Lake Garwood", Geographic Names Information System, United States Geological Survey, United States Department of the Interior
- "Mount Alexandra", Geographic Names Information System, United States Geological Survey, United States Department of the Interior
- "Mount Atholl", Geographic Names Information System, United States Geological Survey, United States Department of the Interior

This article incorporates public domain material from websites or documents of the United States Geological Survey.
