= Hobbs Ridge =

Ridge in Antarctica

- Location within Antarctica

Geography
- Continent: Antarctica
- Region: Victoria Land
- Range coordinates: 77°53′S 163°58′E

Hobbs Ridge (77°53′S 163°58′E) is a prominent arc-shaped ridge which circumscribes Hobbs Glacier to the north and northwest and forms the divide with the lower part of Blue Glacier, on the Scott Coast of Victoria Land, Antarctica. It was named in association with Hobbs Glacier. It forms the northernmost part of the Denton Hills.

== Location ==
Hobbs Ridge, which includes Hobbs Peak, Goat Mountain, Mount Kowalczyk and Williams Peak, lies to the southeast of the mouth of Blue Glacier, and surrounds the north and east of Hobbs Glacier. The Hobbs Stream leads from Hobbs Glacier into Salmon Bay, just north of Cape Chocolate.

== Features ==
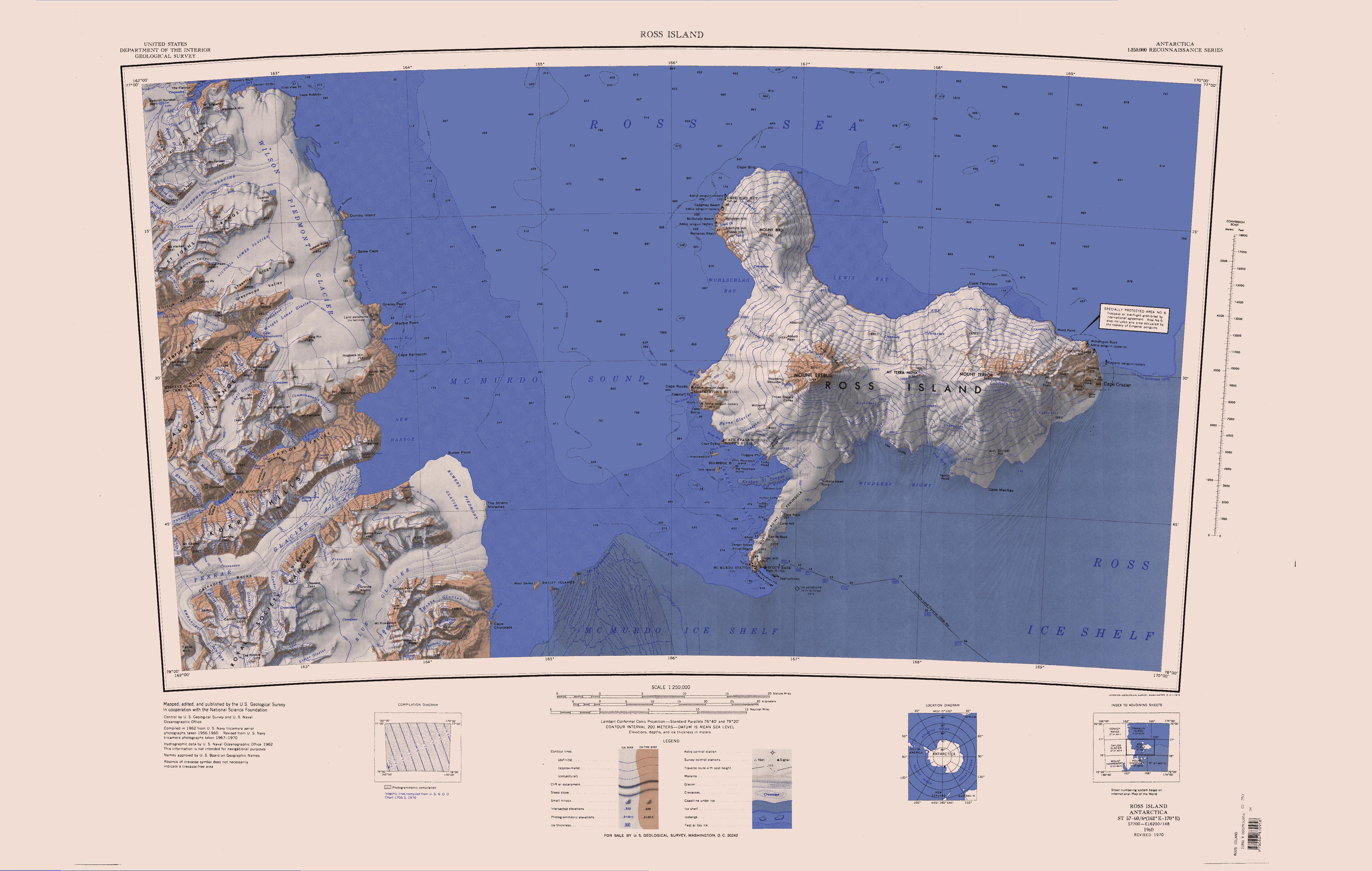
Hobbs Ridge below the mouth of Blue Glacier in southwest of map,

Features include:

=== Davison Peak ===
77.876496°S 164.062317°E A coastal peak, 1,340 metres (4,400 ft) high, located 1.8 nautical miles (3.3 km; 2.1 mi) east of Hobbs Peak. Named after William Davison, Zoology Department, Canterbury University, who from 1983 specialized in Antarctic fish research.

=== Hobbs Peak ===
77°53′S 163°56′E. A prominent peak, 1,510 metres (4,950 ft) high, on the divide between the Hobbs and Blue Glaciers. It is the highest point on the E-W section of this dividing ridge. Climbed by members of the VUWAE (1960-61), who gave it this name from its nearness to Hobbs Glacier.

=== Goat Mountain ===
77°55′S 163°50′E. A peak, 1,640 metres (5,380 ft) high, standing west of Hobbs Glacier between Hobbs Peak and Mount Kowalczyk. Climbed by the VUWAE, 1960-61, and so named by them because a balanced mass of gneiss with a goat-like silhouette protrudes 10m above the general profile of the southern slope of the mountain.

=== Mount Kowalczyk ===
77°56′S 163°47′E. A mountain, 1,690 metres (5,540 ft) high, standing 1 nautical mile (1.9 km; 1.2 mi) south of Goat Mountain at the head of Hobbs Glacier. Charted by the BrAE under Scott, 1910-13. Named by the US-ACAN in 1964 for Chester Kowalczyk, Chief of the Photogrammetry Branch, United States Naval Oceanographic Office, who for many years had responsibility for the photogrammetric compilation of Antarctic charts.

=== Datum Peak ===
77°58′S 163°48′E. A peak 1,575 metres (5,167 ft) high near the southwest extremity of Hobbs Ridge, rising above the south side of Gauss Glacier, 1.6 nautical miles (3.0 km; 1.8 mi) west of Williams Peak. The name is one of a group in the area associated with surveying applied in 1993 by NZGB. Named from datum (a practical representation of a reference system), a geodesy and surveying term defined by fixed coordinates.

=== Projection Peak ===
77°59′S 163°47′E. A peak 1,475 metres (4,839 ft) high rising above the head of Garwood Glacier at the southwest extremity of Hobbs Ridge. Named by the NZGB in 1993 in association with several glaciers on this ridge (Bonne, Cassini and Mollweide Glaciers) that are named after types of map projections.

=== Williams Peak ===
77°58′S 163°57′E. A prominent peak over 1,400 metres (4,600 ft) high in a nodal position between the drainage of the Hobbs, Salmon and Garwood Glaciers. Named by the Victoria University of Wellington Antarctic Expedition (1960-61) for Doctor J. Williams, Vice-Chancellor of the University.

== Nearby features ==
Features to the south of the ridge include:

=== Hobbs Glacier ===
77°54′S 164°24′E. An eastward flowing glacier, about 7 nautical miles (13 km; 8.1 mi)long, lying 2 nautical miles (3.7 km; 2.3 mi) south of Blue Glacier. First explored by the BrNAE (1901-04) under Scott. Scott's second expedition, the BrAE (1910-13), explored the area more thoroughly and named the glacier for Professor William H. Hobbs of the University of Michigan, an authority on glaciology.

=== Priddy Glacier ===
77°56′S 164°01′E. A glacier, 2 nautical miles (3.7 km; 2.3 mi) long, on the west side of Esser Hill, flowing northwest to join Hobbs Glacier. Named in 1992 by US-ACAN after Allan R. Priddy of Holmes and Narver, Inc., who experienced one winter above 76| in Greenland and one below 76| at McMurdo Station, as well as several summer seasons in Antarctica from 1969-91. He was construction foreman at four geological field camps and for four summer seasons at South Pole Station, and was a key crew member in the building of both Siple I and Siple II Stations.

=== Esser Hill ===
77°56′S 164°05′E. A peak, 1,235 metres (4,052 ft) high, standing between the divergent flow of the Priddy Glacier and Blackwelder Glacier, 1 nautical mile (1.9 km; 1.2 mi) southwest of Chambers Hill. Named in 1992 by US-ACAN after Alan C. Esser of Holmes and Narver, Inc., who served as Project Manager of Antarctic Support Activities, 1976-80, and was responsible for contractor operations at McMurdo Station, South Pole Station and Siple Station, as well as field activities in support of the United States Antarctic Program.

=== Hobbs Stream ===
77°55′S 164°30′E. Seasonal meltwater stream flowing from the mouth of Hobbs Glacier into Salmon Bay. Referred to, but not named in publications of the BrAE (1910-13) under Scott. Named after Hobbs Glacier by the NZGSAE, 1958-59.

=== MacMillan Point ===
77°55′S 164°34′E. An ice-free point, 1.5 nautical miles (2.8 km; 1.7 mi) north of Cape Chocolate, forming the north side of the entrance to Salmon Bay. Named in 1992 by US-ACAN after Mark T. MacMillan of San Jose, CA, a research assistant in the United States Antarctic Program who lost his life in a diving accident at New Harbor, McMurdo Sound, on November 14, 1987. A graduate of the University of California, Santa Cruz and a diver, he was in a group collecting foraminifera from the sea at the time of the accident..

=== Salmon Bay ===
77°56′S 164°33′E. A bay just north of Cape Chocolate along the coast of Victoria Land. The bay was originally named Davis Bay in association with Davis Glacier (now Salmon Glacier) by the BrAE, 1910-13. The glacier was subsequently renamed Salmon Glacier by the N.Z. Northern Survey Party of the CTAE (1956-58) to avoid confusion with a second Davis Glacier in Victoria Land. In order to preserve the original association, the name of this bay was also changed.

=== Hofman Hill ===
77°55′S 164°13′E. An ice-free peak, 1,065 metres (3,494 ft) high, standing at the north side of the terminus of Blackwelder Glacier. Named by US-ACAN in 1992 after Robert J. Hofman, biologist, Marine Mammal Commission, Washington, DC, from 1975; conducted seal studies in 12 visits to Antarctica in the 1960's and 1970's; United States Representative to the Scientific Committee for the Conservation of Antarctic Marine Living Resources, 1983-86.

=== Blackwelder Glacier ===
77°56′S 164°12′E. A pocket glacier, 1 nautical mile (1.9 km; 1.2 mi) wide and 2 nautical miles (3.7 km; 2.3 mi) long, between Salmon Hill and Hobbs Glacier. The glacier was studied during United States Navy OpDFrz, 1957-58, by Troy L. Péwé and was named by him for Doctor Eliot Blackwelder, former head of the Geology Department at Stanford University.

=== Salmon Hill ===
77°57′S 164°09′E. A hill between Salmon and Blackwelder Glaciers. So named by F. Debenham of the BrAE (1910-13) because of its sandy pink color due to a pink limestone.

=== Lake Péwé ===
77°56′S 164°18′E. A small lake at 550 metres (1,800 ft) elevation on the uppermost Koettlitz bench, 0.5 nautical miles (0.93 km; 0.58 mi) east of Blackwelder Glacier. Named in recognition of the glacial geomorphological work done in the Koettlitz Glacier area by Troy L. Pewe (Pewe" Peak, q.v.) of the University of Alaska. It was near this lake that members of the VUWAE, 1960-61, found a note left by Péwé, reporting observations on glacial erratics. Named by the VUWAE party.

=== Haggerty Hill ===
77°57′S 164°12′E. A mostly ice-free peak, 1,100 metres (3,600 ft) high, standing 0.5 nautical miles (0.93 km; 0.58 mi) southeast of Salmon Hill and immediately north of the snout of Salmon Glacier. Named in 1992 by US-ACAN after Patrick R. Haggerty of Holmes and Narver, Inc., who managed logistics and construction activities at McMurdo Station, South Pole Station, Siple Station and various field camps during the 1970's and 1990's. He introduced female construction workers to the United States Antarctic Program for the first time during the 1978-79 season, and implemented computer based construction scheduling in the 1990's.

=== Salmon Glacier ===
77°58′S 164°05′E. Small glacier lying 5 nautical miles (9.3 km; 5.8 mi) west-southwest of Cape Chocolate and immediately south of Salmon Hill. It appears on the charts of the BrAE (1910-13) as Davis Glacier, a name given to another feature in Victoria Land. To avoid the confusion of having identical names for nearby features, this glacier was renamed after nearby Salmon Hill by the N.Z. Northern Survey Party of the CTAE, 1956-58.

=== Salmon Stream ===
77°56′S 164°30′E. A small meltwater stream about 6 nautical miles (11 km; 6.9 mi) long, draining from the Salmon Glacier and flowing into Salmon Bay. Originally named Davis Creek by the BrAE, 1910-13. Renamed for its association with Salmon Glacier by the NZ-APC in 1960.

== Sources ==
- Alberts, Fred G., ed. (1995), Geographic Names of the Antarctic (PDF) (2 ed.), United States Board on Geographic Names This article incorporates public domain material from websites or documents of the United States Board on Geographic Names.
- "Davison Peak", Geographic Names Information System, United States Geological Survey, United States Department of the Interior
- Ross Island, USGS: United States Geological Survey

This article incorporates public domain material from websites or documents of the United States Geological Survey.
