= Alph River =

River in Antarctica

- Alph River

Location
- continent: Antarctica
- region: Victoria Land

Physical characteristics
- Mouth
  - coordinates: 78°12′S 163°45′E

Alph River (78.2°S 163.75°E) is a small river, flowing in summertime, on the northern side of Koettlitz Glacier, Scott Coast, Antarctica. It rises from Koettlitz ice at the upper end of Pyramid Trough and from south to north includes Pyramid Ponds, Trough Lake, Walcott Lake, Howchin Lake, and Alph Lake. The Alph ends in a subglacial stream beneath Koettlitz Glacier to McMurdo Sound.

== Exploration and name ==
The portion north of Pyramid Trough was explored and named in February 1911 by the British Antarctic Expedition (BrAE) Western Journey Party led by Thomas Griffith Taylor. He reported that the stream continues north a considerable distance under moraine and ultimately subglacially beneath Koettlitz Glacier to the Ross Sea. This led to the name from a passage in Samuel Taylor Coleridge's poem Kubla Khan: "Where Alph the sacred river ran, Through caverns measureless to man, Down to a sunless sea." The nearby Xanadu Hills are named from the same poem.

== Features ==
=== Pyramid Ponds ===
78.2833333°S 163.45°E A group of ponds lying south of Trough Lake in Pyramid Trough on Scott Coast. Named by New Zealand Geographic Board (NZGB) (1994) in association with Pyramid Trough and The Pyramid.

=== Trough Lake ===
78.28333°S 163.46667°E. A permanently ice-covered pro-glacial lake in the Pyramid Trough. Descriptively named in association with Pyramid Trough.

=== Walcott Lake ===
78.2333333°S 163.4666667°E. One of several lakes in the Alph River system, this one located 1.3 miles east of the snout of Walcott Glacier on Scott Coast. Named by NZGB (1994) in association with Walcott Glacier.

=== Walcott South Stream ===
78.25°S 163.3833333°E. A meltwater stream from the southern part of the snout of Walcott Glacier. It flows eastward to Walcott Lake on Scott Coast. Named by NZGB (1994) in association with Walcott Glacier.

=== Walcott North Stream ===
78.2333333°S 163.3833333°E. A meltwater stream from the northern part of the snout of Walcott Glacier. It flows eastward to Walcott Lake on Scott Coast. Named by NZGB (1994) in association with Walcott Glacier.

=== Howchin Lake ===
78.2166667°S 163.5166667°E. A lake, one of several in the Alph River system, located 1.1 nautical miles (2.0 km; 1.3 mi) southeast of the snout of Howchin Glacier in Denton Hills. Named by NZGB (1994) in association with Howchin Glacier.

=== Alph Lake ===
78.20000°S 163.70000°E. Lake at the foot of Ward Valley on the north-west side of Koettlitz Glacier. It is 0.4 nautical miles (0.74 km; 0.46 mi) long, and surrounded by steep morainic walls. Named by Griffth Taylor of the BrAE, 1911–13 (Capt. Robert Scott) in association with Alph River.

== See also ==
- Onyx River
- List of rivers of Antarctica

== Sources ==
- Alph Lake, AADC: Australian Antarctic Data Centre
- "Alph River", Geographic Names Information System, United States Geological Survey, United States Department of the Interior
- De Mora, S.J.; Whitehead, R.F.; Gregory, M. (1991), "Aqueous geochemistry of major constituents in the Alph River and tributaries in Walcott Bay, Victoria Land, Antarctica", Antarctic Science, 3: 73–86, doi:10.1017/S0954102091000111
- "Howchin Lake", Geographic Names Information System, United States Geological Survey, United States Department of the Interior
- "Pyramid Ponds", Geographic Names Information System, United States Geological Survey, United States Department of the Interior
- Trough Lake, AADC: Australian Antarctic Data Centre
- "Walcott Lake", Geographic Names Information System, United States Geological Survey, United States Department of the Interior
- "Walcott North Stream", Geographic Names Information System, United States Geological Survey, United States Department of the Interior
- "Walcott South Stream", Geographic Names Information System, United States Geological Survey, United States Department of the Interior
- "Xanadu Hills", Geographic Names Information System, United States Geological Survey, United States Department of the Interior

This article incorporates public domain material from websites or documents of the United States Geological Survey.
