= Miers Valley =

Valley in Antarctica

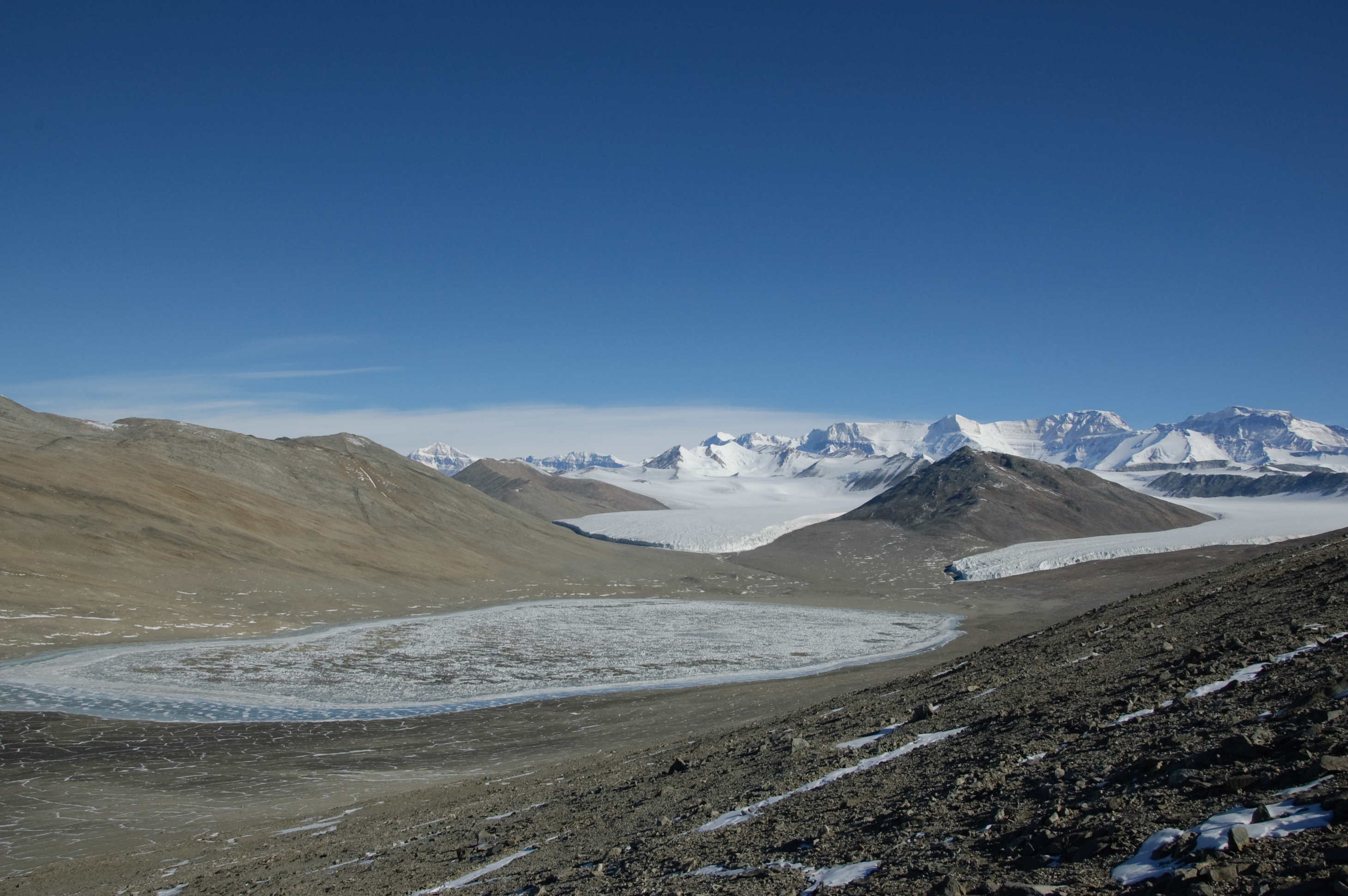
- Upper Miers Valley. Adams glacier on the left and Miers glacier on the right

- Location within Antarctica

Geography
- Location: Antarctica
- Coordinates: 78°6′S 164°0′E
- Interactive map of Miers Valley

Miers Valley (78°6′S 164°0′E) is a valley just south of Marshall Valley and west of Koettlitz Glacier, on the coast of Victoria Land, Antarctica. The valley is ice-free except for Miers Glacier in its upper (western) part and Lake Miers near its center. It was mapped and named by Robert Falcon Scott's British Antarctic Expedition, 1910–13. The name is possibly after Edward J. Miers, a marine biologist from the British Museum (Natural History) who examined crustacea from the Erebus and Terror expeditions.

== Location ==
Miers Valley is in the Denton Hills. It is one of the McMurdo Dry Valleys. It is south of Marshall Valley and north of Hidden Valley, and opens onto the Koettlitz Glacier to the east. Catacomb Hill rises to the west of the Miers Glacier, at the head of the valley, on a ridge that separates it from the Blue Glacier to the west. Features include Catacomb Hill, Mount Lama, Miers Glacier, Adams Glacier, Holiday Peak, Lake Miers and Penance Pass.

== Features ==
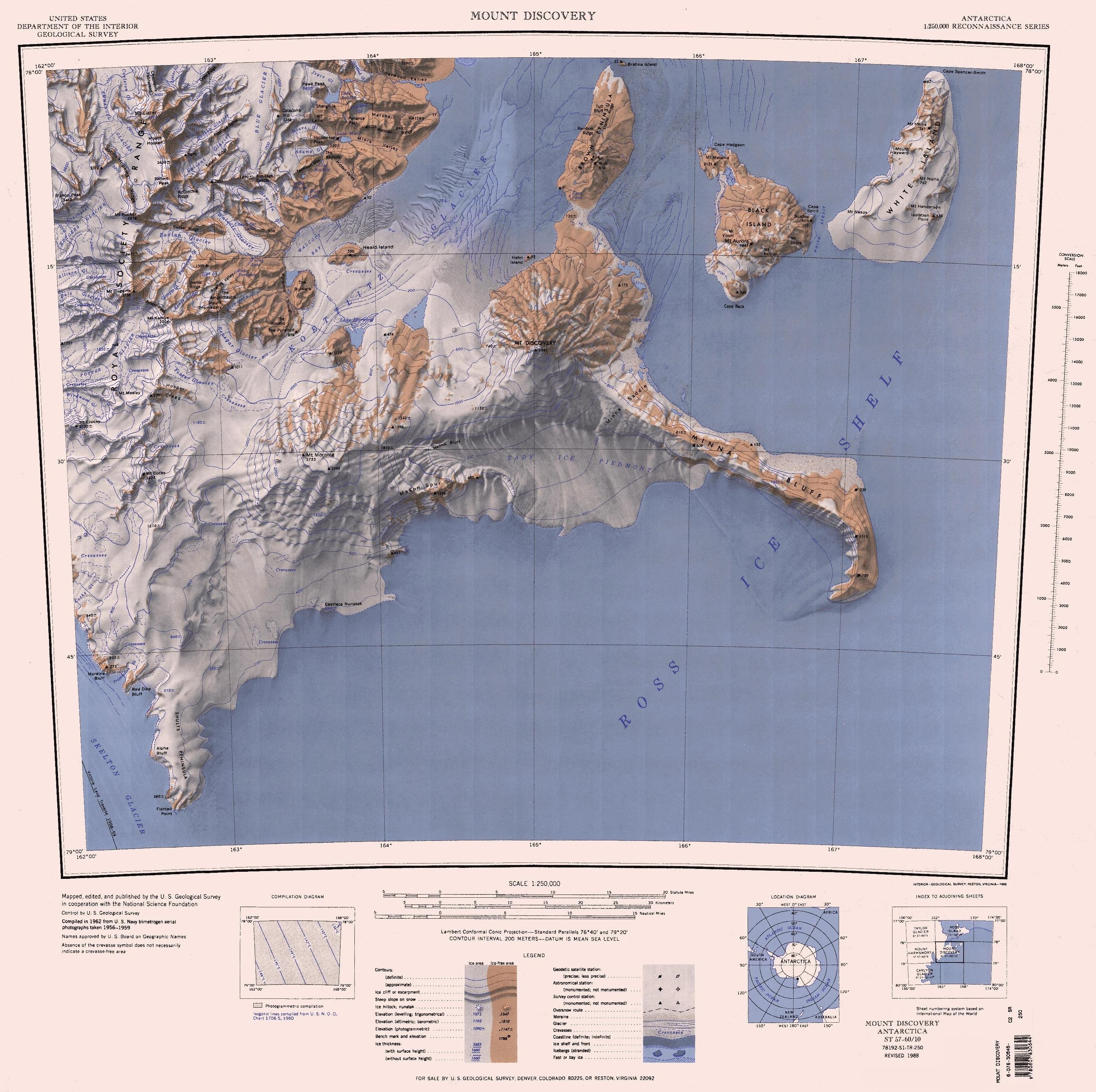
Miers Valley in north of map

=== Catacomb Hill ===
78°04′S 163°25′E. A prominent rock peak, 1,430 metres (4,690 ft) high, on the ridge that borders the east side of the head of Blue Glacier. The New Zealand Blue Glacier Party of the Commonwealth Trans-Antarctic Expedition (CTAE; 1956–58) established a survey station on its summit in December 1957. They gave it this descriptive name from the spectacular cavernous weathering occurring in the granite of the peak.

=== Catacomb Ridge ===
78.0833333°S 163.4°E. A north–south ridge 1,280 metres (4,200 ft) high to the south of Catacomb Hill. Named by New Zealand Geographic Board (NZGB) (1994) in association with Catacomb Hill.

=== Mount Lama ===
78°04′S 163°42′E. A bare rock peak over 800 metres (2,600 ft) high, culminating the ridge north of Miers Glacier and forming the south rampart of the valley named Shangri-la in Victoria Land. Named in association with Shangri-la by the New Zealand Victoria University of Wellington Antarctic Expedition (VUWAE), 1960–61.

=== Miers Glacier ===
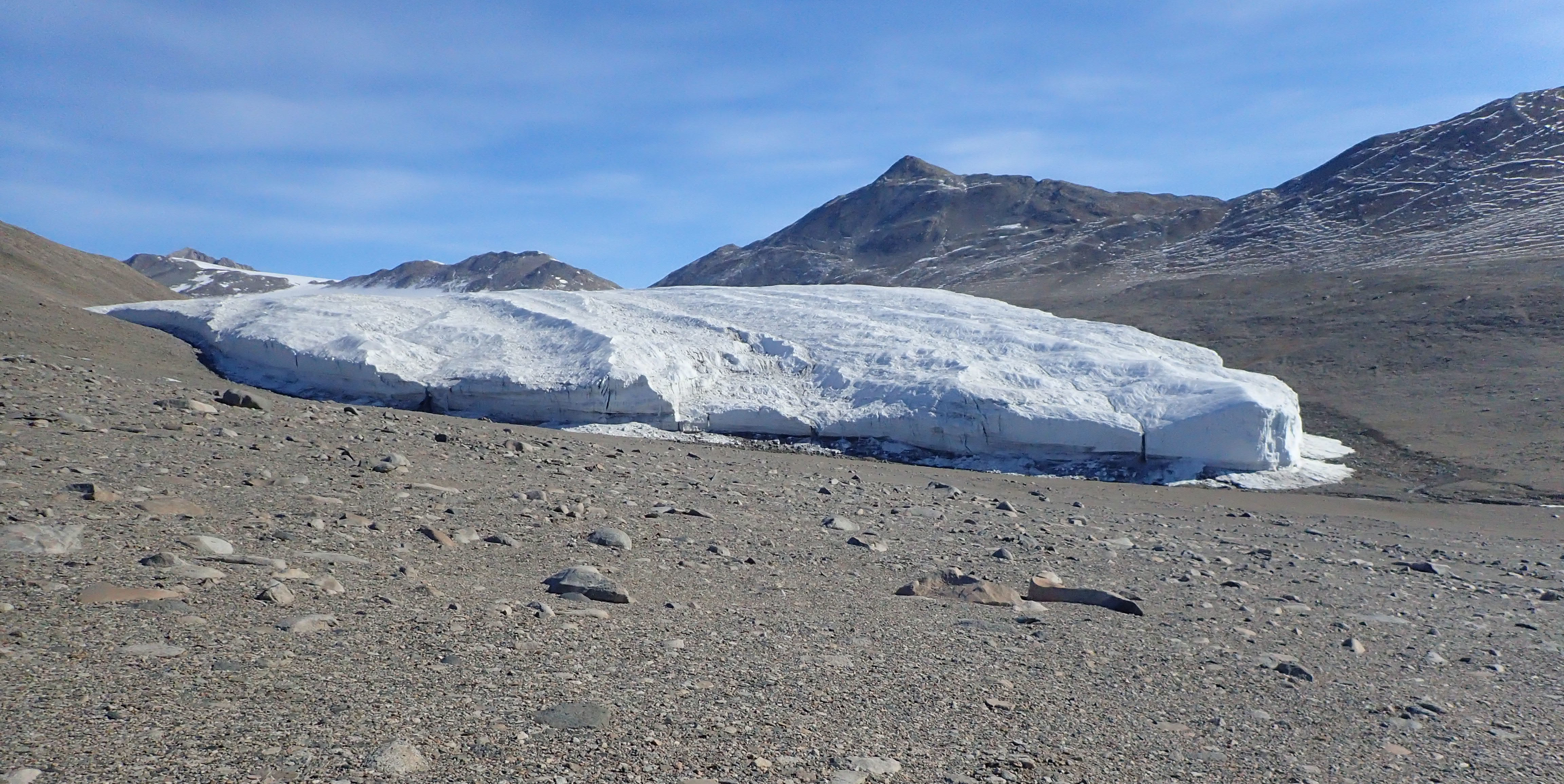
Miers Glacier in 2016

78°05′S 163°40′E. A small glacier north of Terminus Mountain in Victoria Land, occupying the upper (western) portion of Miers Valley. Mapped and named by the British Antarctic Expedition, 1910–13.

=== Aorta Ridge ===
78.1°S 163.5°E A ridge that separates upper Miers Glacier and Adams Glacier and extends eastward to Holiday Peak in Denton Hills, Scott Coast. Aorta Ridge was approved by New Zealand Geographic Board (NZGB) in 1994. The name derives from association with "The Heart," an informal name used in the 1960s for Holiday Peak.

=== Terminus Mountain ===
78°08′S 163°36′E. Mountain over 800 metres (2,600 ft) high, standing immediately south of Adams Glacier on the east side of the Royal Society Range in Victoria Land. It was climbed on March 1, 1911 by Taylor and the Western Journey Party of the BrAE, 1910–13. So named by Taylor because it was the furthest point they ascended in this area.

=== Adams Glacier ===
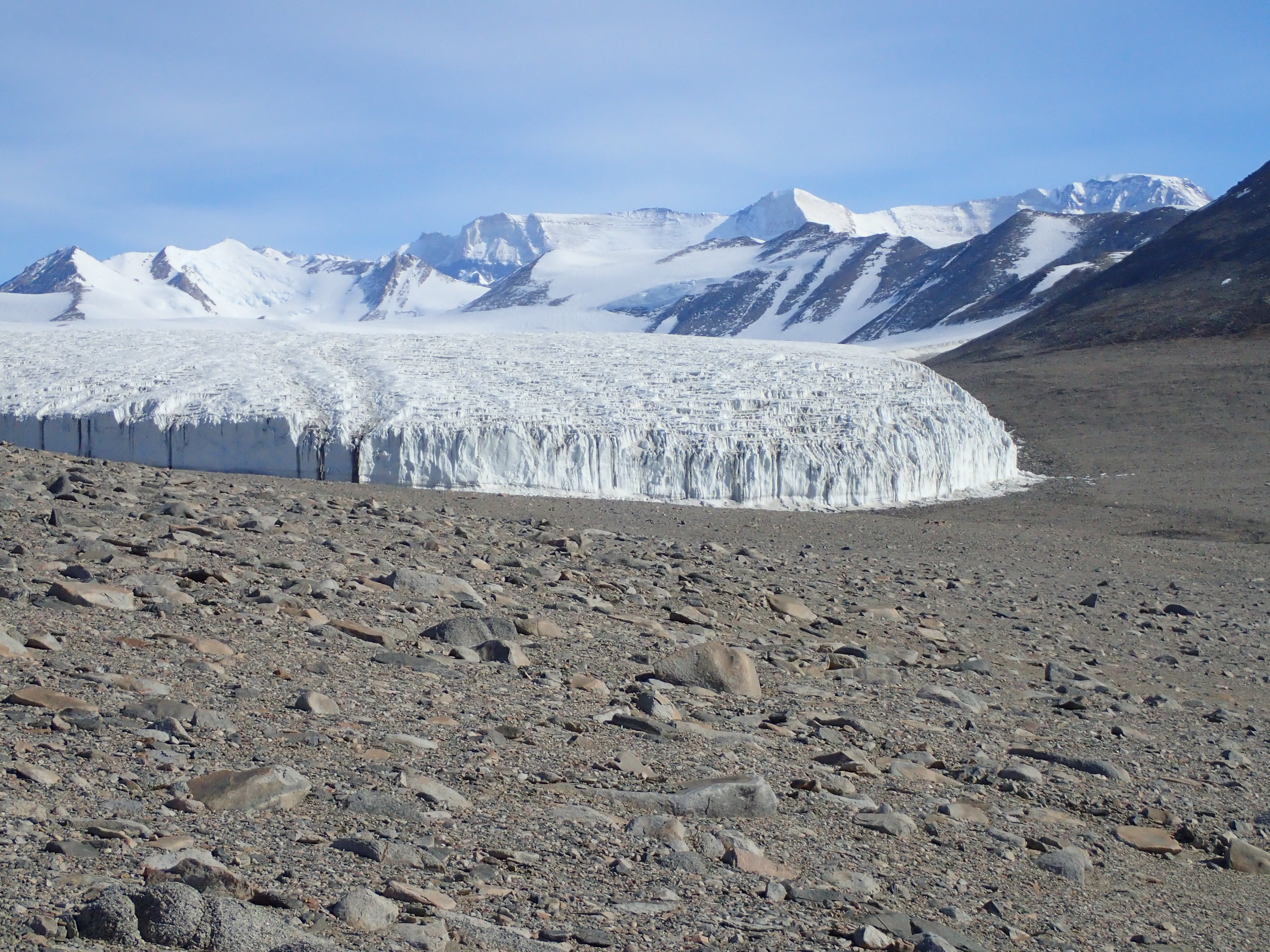
Miers Valley in 2016

78°07′S 163°38′E. A small glacier immediately south of Miers Glacier. The heads of these two glaciers are separated by a low ridge, and the east end of this ridge is almost completely surrounded by the snouts of the two glaciers, which nearly meet in the bottom of the valley, about 1 nautical mile (1.9 km; 1.2 mi) above Lake Miers, into which they drain. Named by the New Zealand Northern Survey Party of the CTAE (1956–58) after Lieutenant (later Sir) Jameson B. Adams, second in command of the shore party of the BrAE (1907–09), who was one of the men to accompany Shackleton to within 97 nautical miles (180 km; 112 mi) of the South Pole.

=== Becker Point ===
78.1333333°S 164.2166667°E A point on Scott Coast at the foot of Miers Valley. Named by the United States Advisory Committee on Antarctic Names (US-ACAN) (1994) after Robert A. Becker, Vice President and Project Director (1982–90) of ITT Antarctic Services, corporate contractor to NSF in Antarctica.

=== Holiday Peak ===
78°06′S 163°36′E. A peak over 800 metres (2,600 ft) high standing between the lower ends of Miers and Adams Glaciers. So named by the New Zealand VUWAE, 1960–61, because of its prominent position overlooking the expedition's Christmas camp.

=== Lake Miers ===
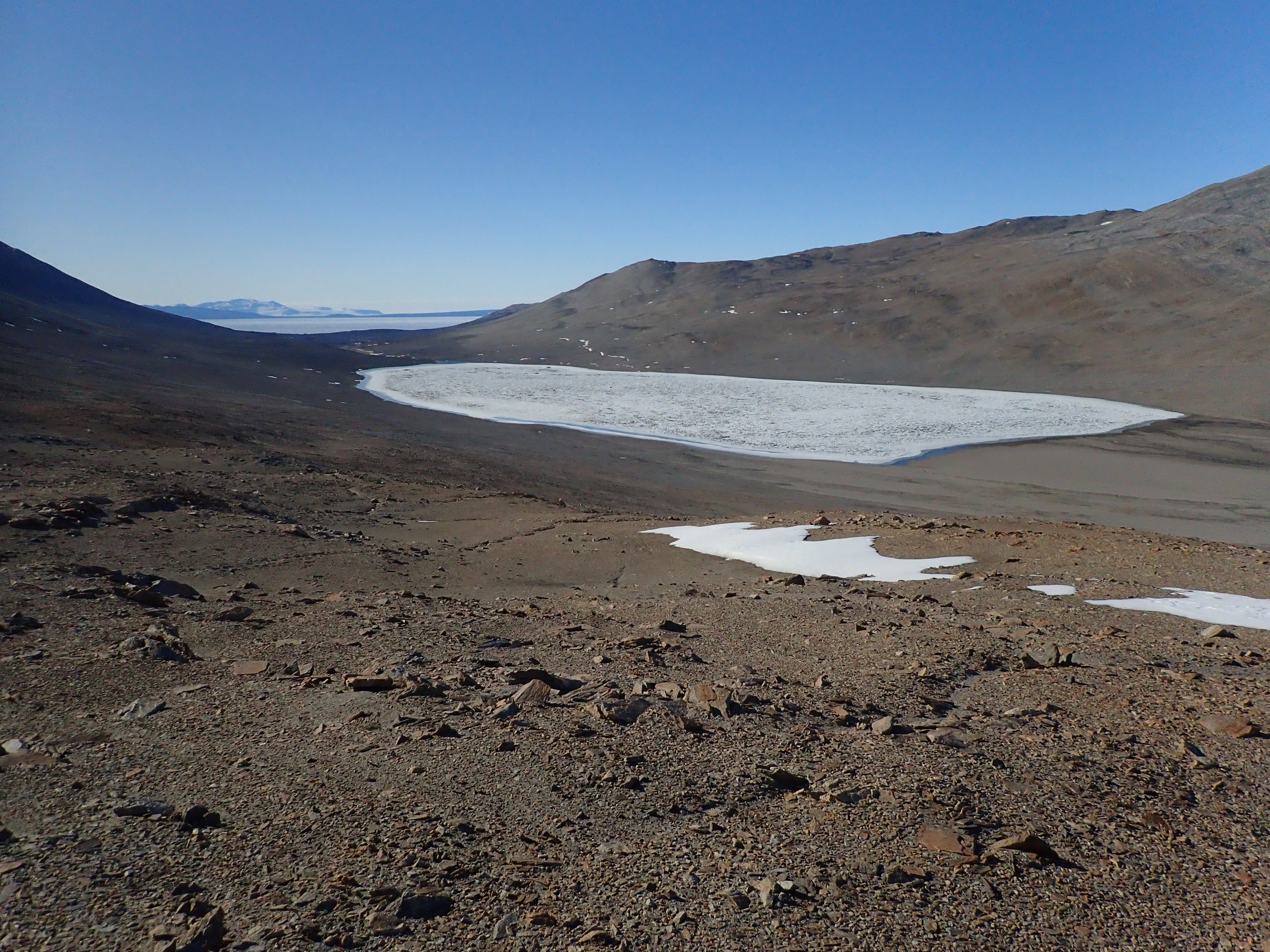
Lake Miers, view towards the east

78°06′S 163°51′E. A small lake in Miers Valley, lying 1 nautical mile (1.9 km; 1.2 mi) east of the snouts of Miers and Adams Glaciers, and filled by meltwater from these glaciers. A stream from the lake flows down the valley in the warmest weather to reach the coast of Victoria Land. Named after Miers Glacier in 1957 by the New Zealand Blue Glacier Party of the CTAE, 1956–58.

=== Penance Pass ===
78°04′S 163°51′E. The lowest, and easternmost, pass from Shangri-la to the Miers Valley. Named by the New Zealand VUWAE, 1960–61.

=== The Altiplano ===
78.1333333°S 163.9166667°E A small elevated plain 550 metres (1,800 ft) high between Findlay Ridge and Miers Valley. So named by a NZGS field party to the area, 1977–78, after the much larger intermontane plateau of the Andes Mountains.

=== Findlay Ridge ===
78.1333333°S 164°E A broad ridge which rises to 750 metres (2,460 ft) high between Miers Valley and Hidden Valley. Named by New Zealand Geographic Board (NZGB) (1994) after New Zealand geologist Robert H. Findlay, a member of the New Zealand geological Survey field party to this area, 1977–78.

== Sources ==
- Alberts, Fred G., ed. (1995), Geographic Names of the Antarctic (PDF) (2 ed.), United States Board on Geographic Names This article incorporates public domain material from websites or documents of the United States Board on Geographic Names.
- "Aorta Ridge", Geographic Names Information System, United States Geological Survey, United States Department of the Interior
- "Becker Point", Geographic Names Information System, United States Geological Survey, United States Department of the Interior
- "Catacomb Ridge", Geographic Names Information System, United States Geological Survey, United States Department of the Interior
- "Denton Hills", Geographic Names Information System, United States Geological Survey, United States Department of the Interior
- "Findlay Ridge", Geographic Names Information System, United States Geological Survey, United States Department of the Interior
- Mount Discovery, USGS: United States Geological Survey
- Putnam, George (1977), "A Brief History of New Zealand Marine Biology", Tuatara, 22 (3)
- "The Altiplano", Geographic Names Information System, United States Geological Survey, United States Department of the Interior

This article incorporates public domain material from websites or documents of the United States Geological Survey.
