= McMurdo Dry Valleys =

Snow-free valleys in Antarctica

Coordinates: 77°28′S 162°31′E

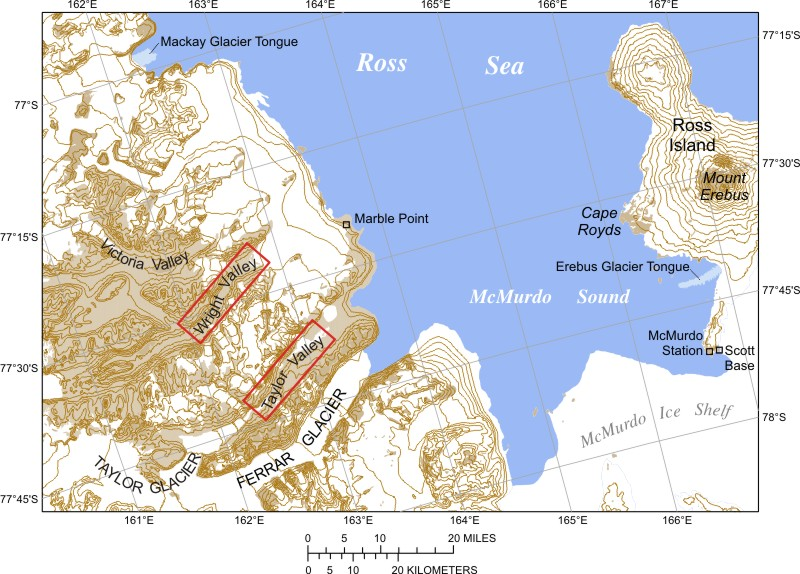
Map of the McMurdo Sound and the Dry Valleys

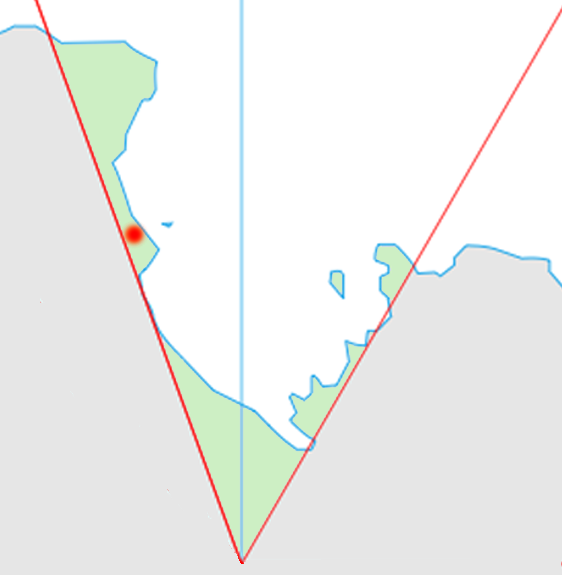
Location of valleys (indicated by red dot) within the Ross Dependency

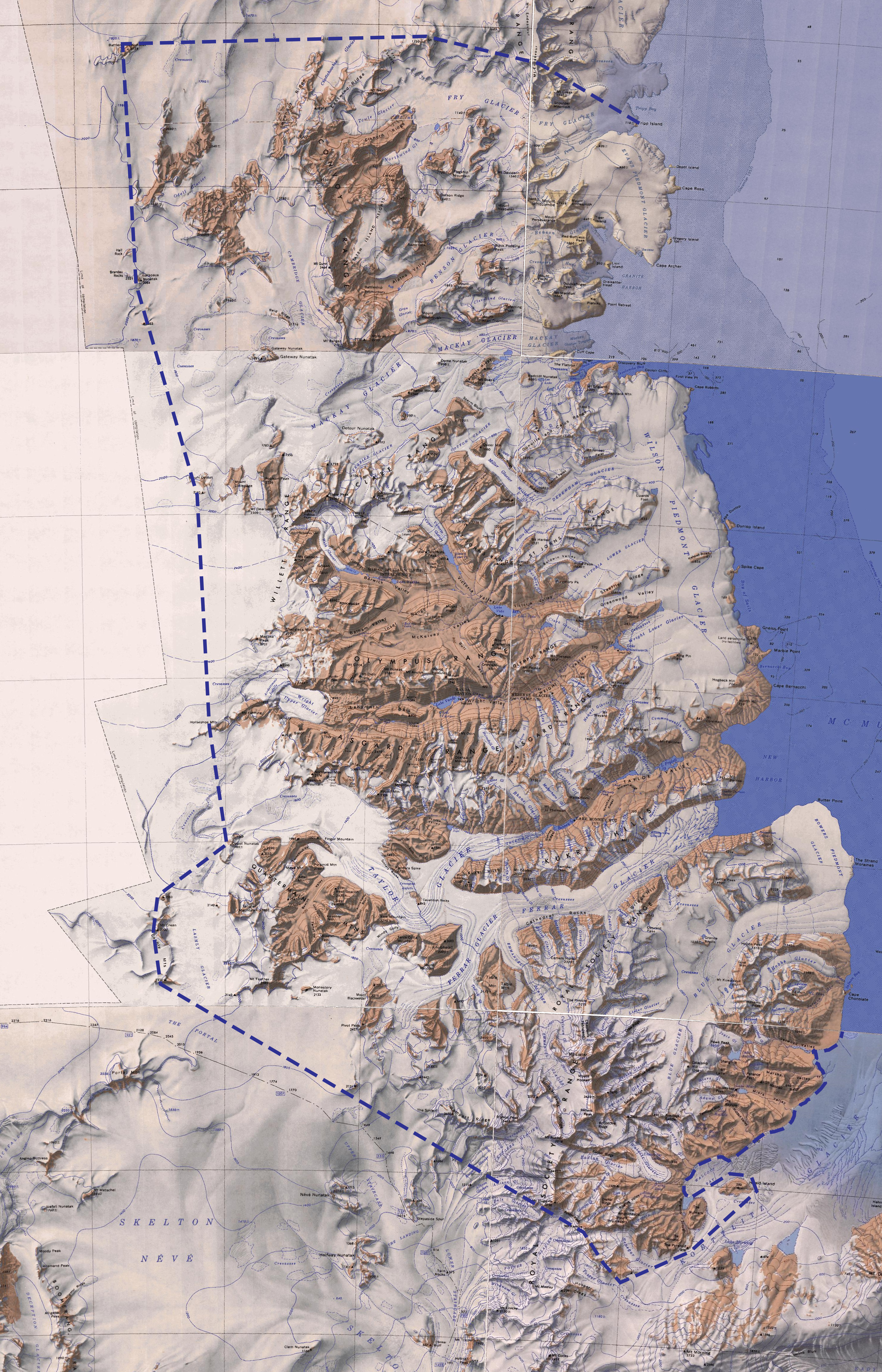
Map showing the delineation of the McMurdo Valleys Antarctic Specially Managed Area (ASMA-2)

The McMurdo Dry Valleys are a series of largely snow-free desert valleys on the continental coastline of Victoria Land, Antarctica, east of the East Antarctic Ice Sheet and west of McMurdo Sound and the Ross Sea. The Dry Valleys are the coldest and driest desert in the world, and the largest ice-free region in Antarctica; as a result, the Valleys have become a hotbed for scientific research in the Antarctic region. The Dry Valleys' climate is due to their location nestled within the Transantarctic Mountains along with high-pressure katabatic winds that scour away snowfall and humidity across the region. Surrounding mountains prevent the flow of ice from nearby glaciers. The region's geology is primarily granites and gneisses, and glacial tills dot the bedrock landscape, with loose gravel covering the ground. The Valleys are one of the driest places on Earth, though there are several anecdotal accounts of rainfall within them.

The region includes many features, including Lake Vida, a saline lake, and the Onyx River, a meltwater stream and Antarctica's longest river. Although no living organisms have been found in the permafrost here, endolithic photosynthetic bacteria have been found living in the relatively moist interior of rocks. Anaerobic bacteria, with a metabolism based on iron and sulfur, have also been found under the Taylor Glacier.

Despite their extreme aridity, the McMurdo Dry Valleys contain a small but distinctive hydrological system. Summer melting from glaciers and seasonal snow can produce short-lived streams that feed lakes whose surfaces remain ice-covered for much of the year. Because evaporation and sublimation greatly exceed precipitation, dissolved salts can become concentrated in closed basins, producing saline and hypersaline waters. These features make the valleys an unusual combination of desert conditions, frozen lakes, episodic meltwater flow, and salt-rich soils.

The valleys are located within the McMurdo Valleys Antarctic Specially Managed Area.

== Climate ==
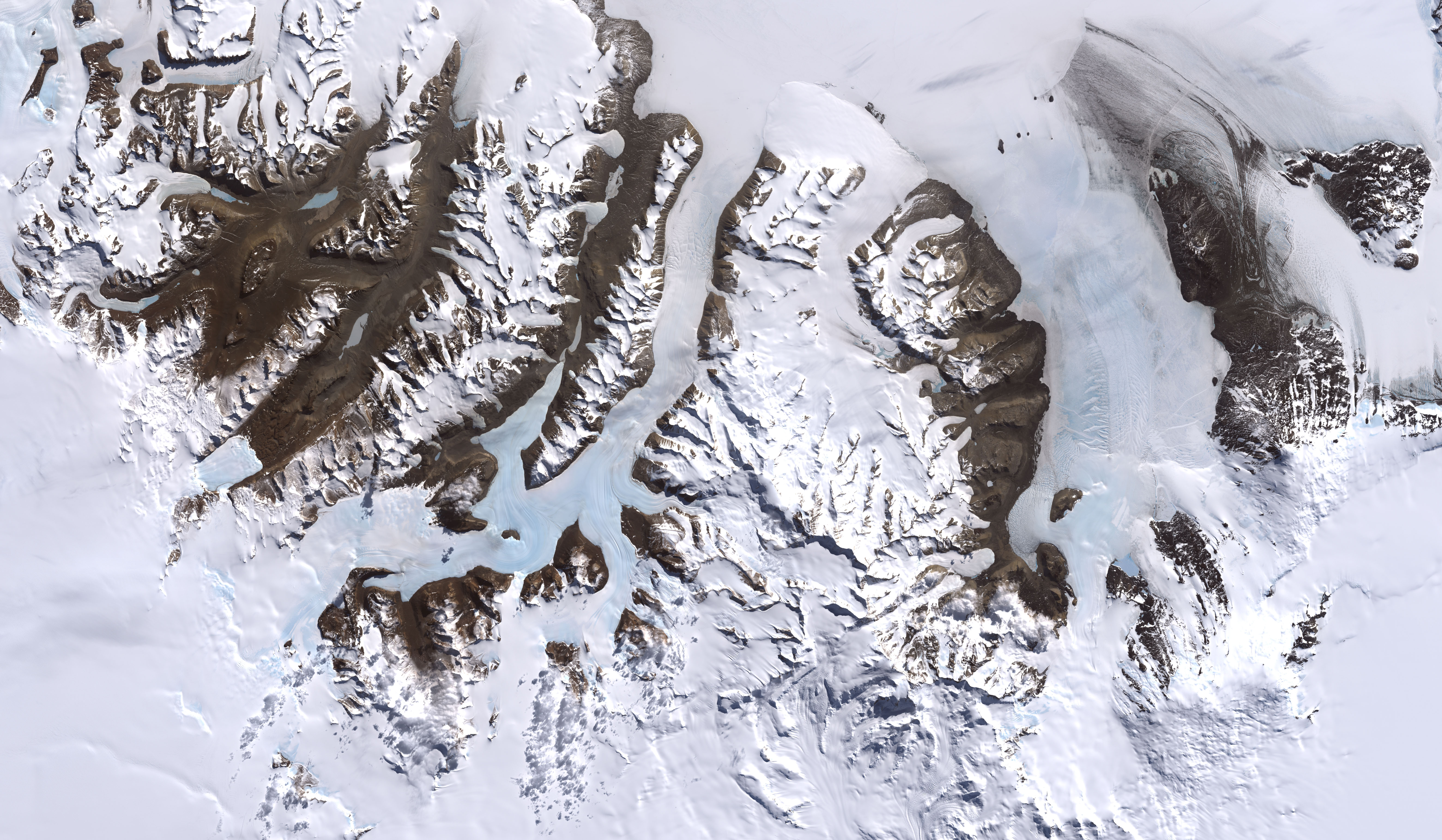
McMurdo Dry Valleys, Landsat 7 imagery acquired on December 18, 1999

The Dry Valleys are one of the most extreme habitats on Earth, and are classified as a cold desert. At approximately 4,500 square kilometres (1,700 mi^{2}), the valleys constitute around 0.03% of the continent and form its largest ice-free region.

The region's low precipitation is the result of the snow shadow that is created from the Transantarctic Mountains the valleys are situated in; the highest peaks in the region are some 3,000 metres (9,800 ft). As a result, much of the valley floors remain exposed and covered with loose gravel, in which ice wedge polygonal patterned ground may be observed.

The conditions in the Dry Valleys are caused, in part, by katabatic winds; these occur when cold, dense air is pulled downhill by the force of gravity. The dry wind evaporates the snow rapidly and little melts into the soil. During the summer, this process can take only hours.

Another important factor is a lack of precipitation. Precipitation averages around 100 millimetres (4 in) per year over a century of records, almost exclusively in the form of snow. This contributes to the low humidity of the area.

Despite the lack of precipitation and surface-level ice, the Dry Valley region is home to over 6000 lakes and ponds.

For several weeks in the summer, the temperature increases enough to allow for glacial melt, which causes small freshwater streams to form. These streams feed the lakes at the base of the valleys, which do not have outflows to the sea, causing them to become highly saline.

The maximum and minimum air temperatures recorded in the Dry Valleys are 12.0 °C (53.6 °F) at Taylor Glacier and −65.7 °C (−86.3 °F) at Lake Vida, respectively. The mean annual air temperature on the valleys floors ranges between −14.7 °C (5.5 °F) at Lake Bonney to −29.6 °C (−21.3 °F) at Lake Vida. Within Taylor Valley, which has eight stations, the valley bottom mean annual temperatures ranges from −14.7 °C (5.5 °F) to −23.0 °C (−9.4 °F), in contrast to the four glaciers stations that range from −15.1 °C (4.8 °F) to −19.4 °C (−2.9 °F).

High elevation sites ranged from −20.7 °C (−5.3 °F) to −25.2 °C (−13.4 °F). The order of mean annual temperatures among the valleys, using valley bottom stations, warmest to coldest is Miers Valley −16.5 °C (2.3 °F), Taylor Valley −18.5 °C (−1.3 °F), Wright Valley −19.8 °C (−3.6 °F) and Victoria Valley −26.8 °C (−16.2 °F).

Climate Statistics for McMurdo Dry Valleys, Antarctica
			Locations		
	Taylor Valley	Taylor Valley	Victoria Valley	Wright Valley	High-altitude sites
	Lake Bonney	Taylor Glacier	Lake Vida	Lake Vanda	Mt. Fleming
Parameters					
Elevation meters	60	334	390	125	1870
Mean daily maximum °C	−14.7	−15.1	−23.4	−17.3	−23.1
Daily mean °C	−17.3	−17.2	−26.8	−19.5	−24.1
Mean daily minimum °C	−19.2	−18.7	−29.6	−22.0	−25.2
Record high °C	10.6	12.0	10.0	10.7	−4.8
Record low °C	−48.3	−44.9	−65.7	−53.7	−46.3

== Geology ==
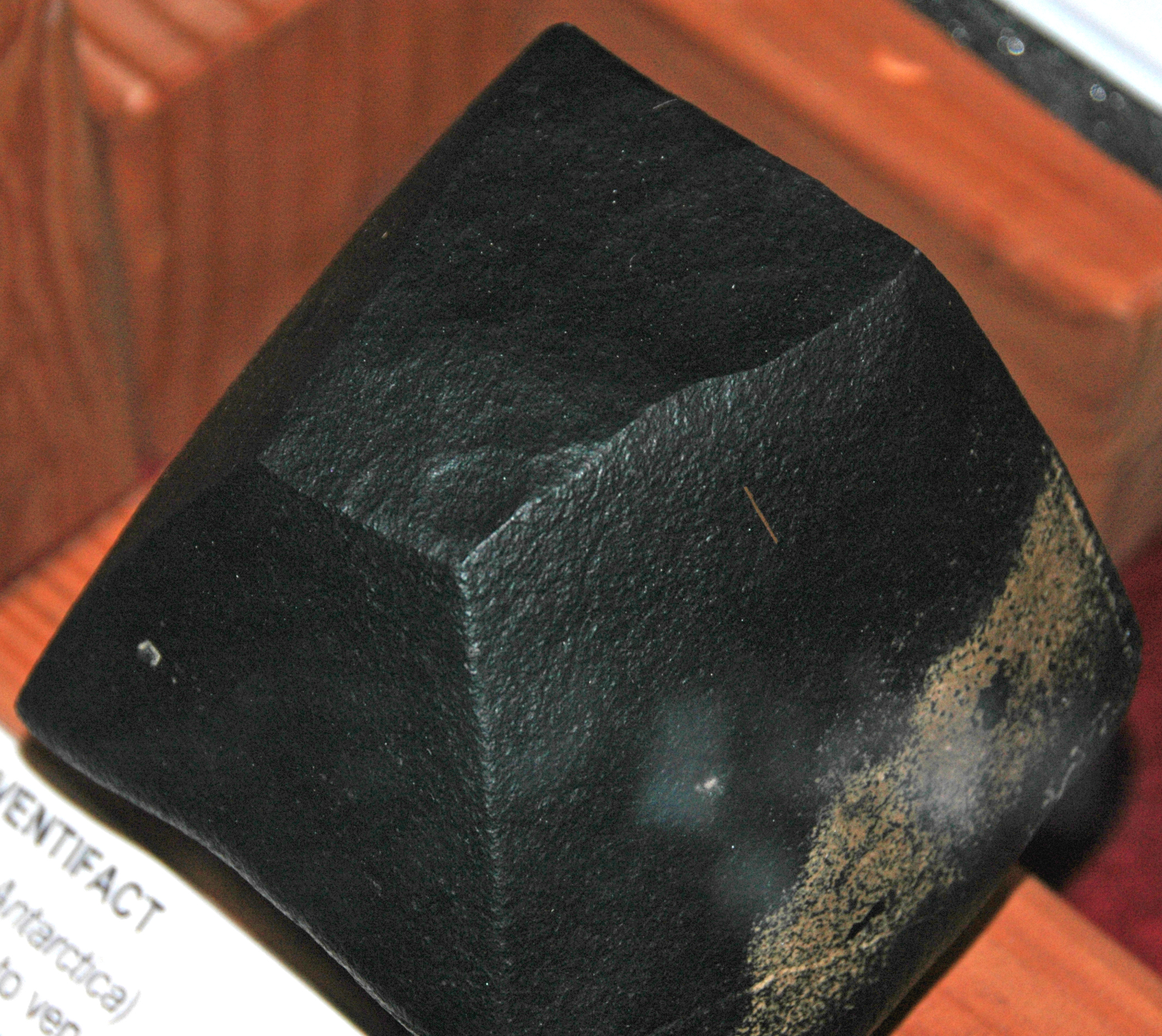
A basalt ventifact from the Dry Valleys

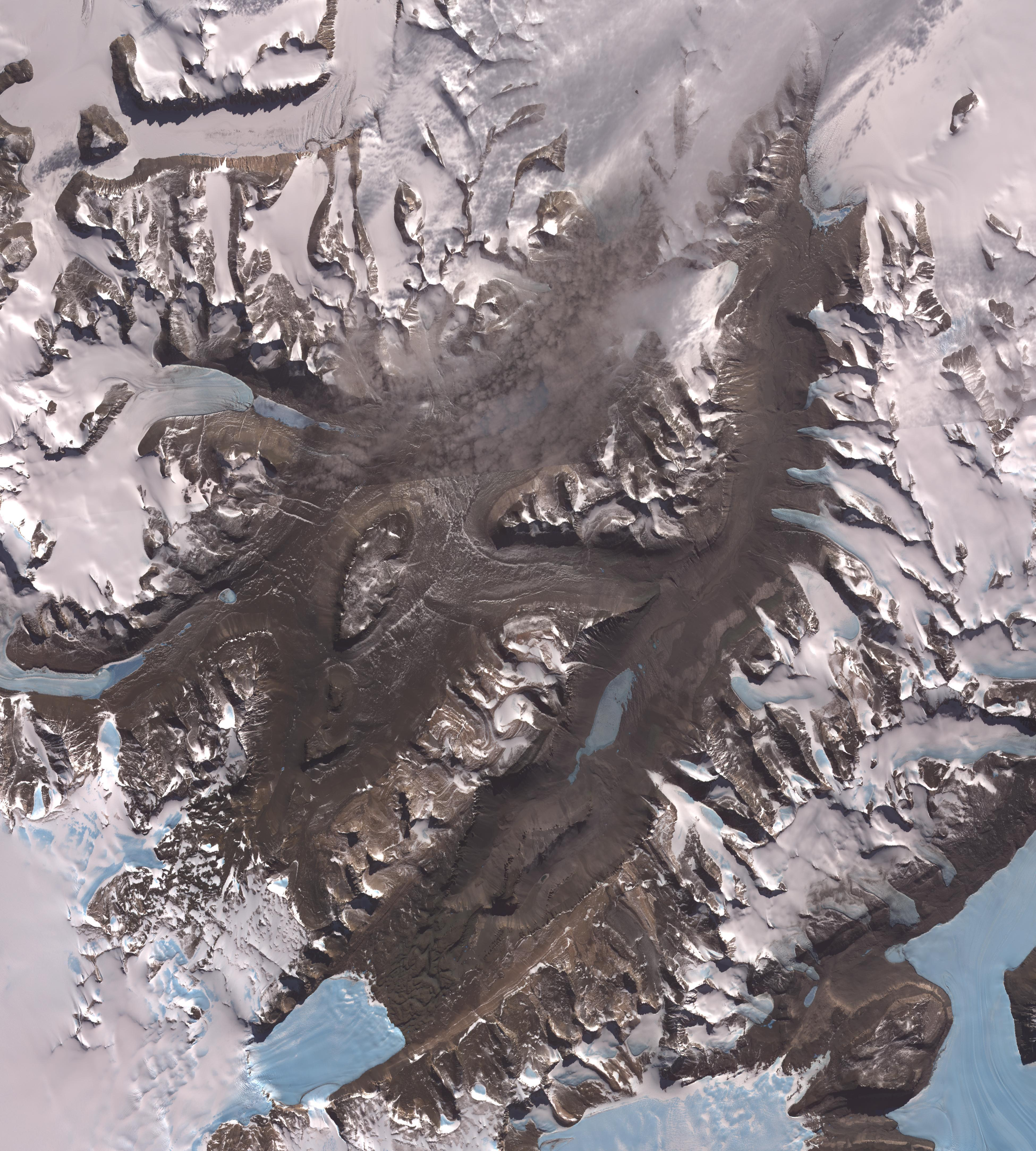
Advanced Spaceborne Thermal Emission and Reflection Radiometer (ASTER) image of the Dry Valleys

The McMurdo Oasis is bounded by the coastline of south Victoria Land and the Polar Plateau. The Taylor and Wright Valleys are major ice-free valleys within the Transantarctic Mountains. These "dry valleys" include hummocky moraines, with frozen lakes, saline ponds, sand dunes, and meltwater streams. Basement rocks include the Late Precambrian or Early Palaeozoic Skelton Group metamorphic rocks, primarily the Asgard Formation, which is a medium-high-grade marble and calc schist. The Palaeozoic Granite Harbour intrusives include granitoid plutons and dykes, which intruded into the metasedimentary Skelton Group in the Late Cambrian–Early Ordovician during the Ross orogeny. The basement complex is overlain by the Jurassic Beacon Supergroup, which is itself intruded by Ferrar Dolerite sheets and sills. The McMurdo Volcanic Group intrudes, or is interbedded with, the Taylor and Wright Valleys' moraines as basaltic cinder cones and lava flows. These basalts have ages between 2.1 and 4.4 Ma. The Dry Valley Drilling Project (1971–75) determined the Pleistocene layer within the Taylor Valley was between 137 and 275 m thick, and composed of interbedded sandstones, pebble conglomerates, and laminated silty mudstones. This Pleistocene layer disconformably overlies Pliocene and Miocene diamictites.

== Research ==
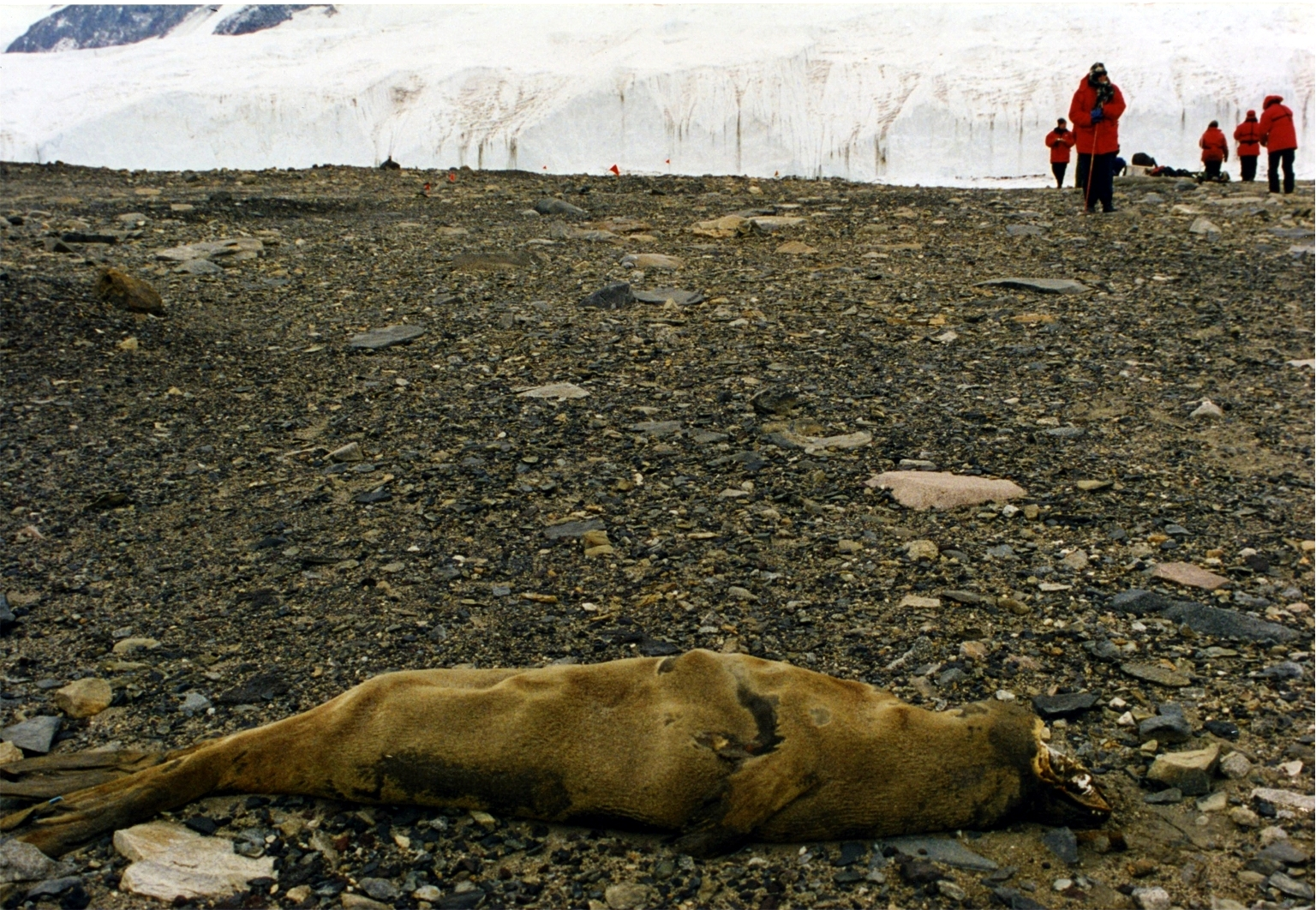
Mummified seal carcass

Since the Valleys' discovery in the early 1900s and the establishment of McMurdo Station (United States) and Scott Base (New Zealand) as research stations on nearby Ross Island in the 1950s, the Dry Valleys region has been extensively studied by scientists. The valleys' hyper-arid, cold-desert climate was soon identified as a high-fidelity terrestrial analogue for the environment of Mars, and geologists and astrophysicists have subsequently used the Valleys as a testing ground for analog-based studies since NASA's Viking Program in the 1970s.

In 1985, the first continuously operating meteorological station was installed at Lake Hoare, and in 1992, Taylor Valley, the southernmost of the three major Dry Valleys, was selected as a National Science Foundation Long Term Ecological Research (LTER) site, enabling for long-term scientific investigation of ecological processes over decadal timescales. As of August 2025, there are a total of 26 real-time meteorological stations, stream gauges, and observing platforms and a total of 1028 unique scientific publications affiliated or supported by the LTER program.

Irish and American researchers conducted a field expedition in 2013 to University Valley in order to examine the microbial population and to test a drill designed for sampling on Mars in the permafrost of the driest parts of the valleys, the areas most analogous to the Martian surface. They found no living organisms in the permafrost, making University Valley the first location on the planet visited by humans with no detected active microbial life.

A 2025 study of permafrost cores found diverse bacterial communities in lower Wright Valley and Pearse Valley, but almost no amplifiable DNA at the high-elevation Friis Hills (1,296 m); the New Zealand scientists suggested this reflects either a limit to DNA-based detection or a “microbiological treeline” above about 1,000 m in the Transantarctic Mountains.

Similarly, much research has been done on analyzing the various ice-covered lakes and streams in the valleys. The lakes are unique physically due to a climate-induced balance between the maintenance of a thick, permanent ice cover due to low temperatures, the loss of ice to sublimation, and the replacement of water into the lakes themselves from seasonal glacial meltwater inflow.

Research has discovered the presence of microbial mats along glacial-melt streams, lakes, wetlands, and ice in the region. Dry Valley microbial mats are unique due to the constant scouring from katabatic winds.

Endolithic bacteria have been found living in the Dry Valleys, sheltered from the dry air in the relatively moist interior of rocks. Summer meltwater from the glaciers provides the primary source of soil nutrients.

Anaerobic bacteria whose metabolism is based on iron and sulfur live in sub-freezing temperatures under the Taylor Glacier.

It was previously thought that algae were staining the red ice emerging at Blood Falls, but it is now known that the staining is caused by high levels of iron oxide.

In 2014, drones were used in the McMurdo Dry Valleys by a team of scientists from Auckland University of Technology (AUT) to create baseline maps of the vegetation. In 2015, the New Zealand Antarctic Research Institute granted funding to AUT to develop methods for operating unmanned aerial vehicles. Over successive summer seasons in Antarctica, the AUT team created three dimensional maps with sub-centimeter resolution, which are now used as baselines.

Part of the Valleys was designated an environmentally protected area in 2004.

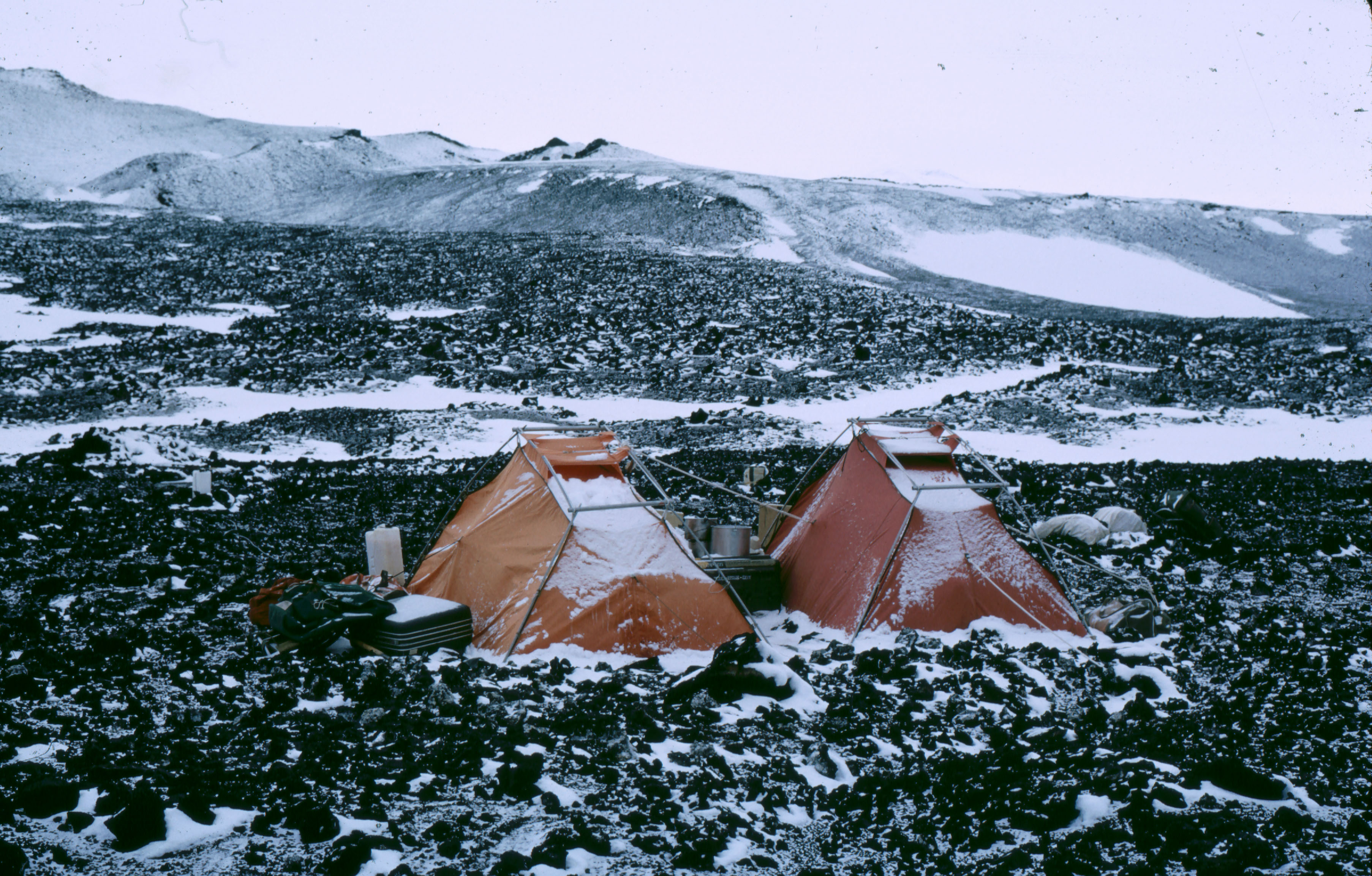
Field camp of scientists during the Antarctic summer, c. 1965

== Major geographic features ==
=== Valleys ===
- Alatna Valley (sometimes called Atlanta Valley) is the northernmost, north of Benson Glacier.

From north to south, the three main valleys are

- Victoria Valley (between St. Johns Range in the north and Olympus Range in the south)
- Wright Valley (between Olympus Range in the north and Asgard Range in the south)
- Taylor Valley (between Asgard Range in the north and Kukri Hills in the south)

West of Victoria Valley are, from north to south,

- Barwick Valley
- Balham Valley
- McKelvey Valley

Stretching south from Balham Valley are, from west to east:

- Priscu Valley
- Wall Valley
- Virginia Valley
- Stuiver Valley

West of Taylor Valley is

- Pearse Valley (sometimes incorrectly spelled Pearce Valley).

Further south, between Royal Society Range in the west and the west coast of McMurdo Sound at the lobe of Koettlitz Glacier are, from north to south:

- Garwood Valley
- Marshall Valley
- Miers Valley

=== Glaciers ===
- Clark

==== Wright Valley ====
- Wright Upper
- Wright Lower

==== Taylor Valley ====
- Rhone
- Suess
- Hughes
- Taylor
- Canada
- Commonwealth
- Howard
- Doran

=== Lakes ===
Some of the lakes of the Dry Valleys rank among the world's most saline lakes, with a higher salinity than Lake Assal or the Dead Sea. The most saline of all is small Don Juan Pond.

- Lake Vida (Victoria Valley)
- Lake Thomas (Victoria Valley)
- Lake Vanda (Wright Valley)
- Lake Brownworth (Wright Valley) (freshwater)
- Don Juan Pond (Wright Valley)
- Lake Fryxell (Taylor Valley)
- Lake Hoare (Taylor Valley)
- Lake Chad (Taylor Valley)
- Parera Pond (Taylor Valley) (freshwater)
- Lake Bonney (Taylor Valley)
- Lake Joyce (Pearse Valley)
- Lake Garwood (Garwood Valley)
- Lake Miers (Miers Valley)

==== Former lakes ====
- Lake Washburn (Taylor Valley)

=== Rivers ===
- Kite Stream (Victoria Valley)
- Onyx River (Wright Valley)
- Doran Stream (Taylor Valley)
- Vincent Creek (Taylor Valley)
- Crescent Stream (Taylor Valley)
- Harnish Creek (Taylor Valley)
- Huey Creek (Taylor Valley)
- Lost Seal Stream (Taylor Valley)

=== Other ===
- Blood Falls, a feature caused by iron oxide causing a coloured water outflow from Taylor Glacier into West Lake Bonney
- Gargoyle Ridge, a ridge of eroded exposed rocks in Wright Valley
- Airdevronsix Icefalls, a set of icefalls at the head of Wright Upper Glacier
- Battleship Promontory, a sandstone promontory in Alatna Valley
