= Andersen Creek =

Meltwater stream in Victoria Land, Antarctica

Andersen Creek (Antarctica)

Andersen Creek (77°37′S 162°54′E) is a meltwater stream, 1.5 kilometres (0.9 mi) long, flowing southwest along the east side of Canada Glacier into the northeast corner of Lake Hoare in Taylor Valley, Victoria Land, Antarctica.

It was named by the Advisory Committee on Antarctic Names in 1996 after Dale T. Andersen, NASA limnologist, who established the camp at the base of the stream in 1978 and conducted limnological studies in the area for years afterwards. He participated in the first scuba diving investigations in lakes of the McMurdo Dry Valleys.
