= Lyons Creek =

Lyons Creek or Lyon Creek may refer to:

Waterways

- Lyons Creek (Antarctica)
- Lyon Creek (Kansas)
- Lyons Creek (Maryland), United States
- Lyons Creek (Ontario), Canada

Other

- Lyons Creek Middle School, Coconut Creek, Florida, United States
