= Hendy Hills =

Hendy Hills (77°42′29″S 162°11′46″E) are mostly ice-free hills, 1 nautical mile (1.9 km) long and 1,435 metres (4,708 ft) elevation, located along the western margin of the Rhone Glacier where the glacier descends abruptly to Lake Bonney in Taylor Valley, Victoria Land. Named by the New Zealand Geographic Board in 1998 after Chris H. Hendy, a New Zealand geochemist involved for many years from 1969 in Antarctic research, including work at nearby Lake Bonney.
