= McKay Creek =

Meltwater stream in Antarctica

McKay Creek (77°39′S 162°45′E) is a meltwater stream, 250 metres (270 yd) long, heading on Suess Glacier west-southwest of the west end of Lake Chad at about 100 metres (330 ft) elevation and flowing east-northeast into Lake Chad in Taylor Valley, Victoria Land, Antarctica. It was named by the Advisory Committee on Antarctic Names in 1996 after Christopher P. McKay, a NASA planetary scientist, who conducted limnological research on Lake Hoare from 1982 and pioneered the use of year-round environmental data collection in dry valley ecosystems.
