= Lizotte =

Lizotte is a surname. Notable people with the surname include:

- Abel Lizotte (1870–1926), Major League Baseball first baseman who played for the Pittsburgh Pirates in 1896
- Alan Lizotte, American criminologist
- Blake Lizotte (born 1997), American ice hockey player
- Fernand Lizotte (1904–1996), Canadian politician and a five-term Member of the Legislative Assembly of Quebec
- Linda Lizotte-MacPherson, Canadian public servant
- Louis Philippe Lizotte (1891–1972), Quebec political figure
- Mark Lizotte (born 1966), American-born Australian musician who uses the pseudonym Diesel
- Simon Lizotte, German professional disc golfer
- Simonne Lizotte, independent candidates for public office in Nicolet, Quebec

== See also ==
- Lizotte Creek, a meltwater stream from the southwestern tip of Matterhorn Glacier to the northeast end of Lake Bonney in Taylor Valley, Victoria Land, Antarctica
