= Kaki Ponds =

Ponds in Victoria Land, New Zealand

Coordinates: 77°41′57″S 162°43′12″E

The Kaki Ponds are five small ponds 0.2 nautical miles (0.37 km) north of the terminus of Marr Glacier in Taylor Valley, Victoria Land, Antarctica. They were named by the New Zealand Geographic Board in 1994 after a New Zealand water bird, the black stilt (kakī in Māori). They are mostly seasonally fed by meltwater from the Marr Glacier. While they are close together their chemical composition is quite diverse, and they play an important role in the water and salt geochemistry of the surrounding subsurface in the upper McMurdo Dry Valleys.
