= Vincent Creek =

Watercourse in Antarctica

Vincent Creek (77°43′S 162°26′E) is a meltwater stream, 1,000 metres (3,300 ft) long, flowing north from the north end of Hughes Glacier to the south edge of Lake Bonney in Taylor Valley, Victoria Land. Named by Advisory Committee on Antarctic Names (US-ACAN) in 1996 after Warwick F. Vincent, Universite Laval, Canada; New Zealand limnologist who has conducted experimental ecological research in the McMurdo Dry Valleys from 1978.
