= Furlong Creek =

Furlong Creek may refer to:

- Furlong Creek (Antarctica)
- Furlong Creek (South Dakota)
