= Lake Washburn (Antarctica) =

Former lake in Antarctica

Coordinates: 77.65°S 162.76°E

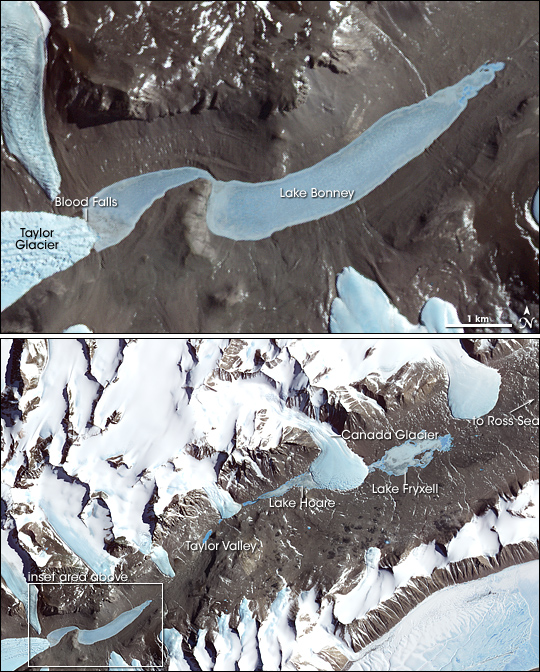
Present-day geography, glaciers and waterbodies in Taylor Valley

Lake Washburn is a lake that formerly existed in the Taylor Valley, McMurdo Dry Valleys, Antarctica. It formed when climatic changes and an expansion of ice caused the flooding of the valley, between 23,000 and 8,340 radiocarbon years ago. Its extent and elevation are unclear but Lake Bonney and Lake Fryxell are considered to be its present-day remnant.

== Location of the former lake ==
Lake Washburn was located in Taylor Valley, McMurdo Dry Valleys. It either covered the southwestern part of the valley where Lake Bonney now lies, or the northeastern part above present-day Lake Fryxell; the present-day lakes in Taylor Valley may be remnants of Lake Washburn. The former lake was named in 1960 after Albert Lincoln Washburn.

It was probably dammed by ice that filled the northwestern part of Taylor Valley, when the Ross Ice Shelf expanded during the Last Glacial Maximum. Depending on how much the ice shelf expanded, two different sizes of the lakes are possible, the smaller of which would have been limited to the Lake Bonney basin at the western end of the valley. Delta deposits that were reinterpreted as river deposits and salt accumulations below the maximum lake levels point to a small size of Lake Washburn as do the properties of soils around the hypothesized shorelines, while soil carbonates and the presence of unfrozen groundwater in the area that would have been covered by a large Lake Washburn implies a large size. The lake extended into Hjorth Valley.

Water levels likely reached an elevation of 300–336 metres (984–1,102 ft) in Lake Bonney basin. In Lake Fryxell Basin, similar highstand levels have been proposed. However, soil salinity data suggests lake levels never rose above 120–140 metres (390–460 ft) in Fryxell basin. Although several proposed deltas and shorelines with algal mats have been cited as indicating highstand lake levels in Lake Fryxell basin, ground penetrating radar studies of the proposed delta features found many are not delats at all, instead representing fluvial channel bar or glaciofluvial deposits (Horsman, 2008). Likewise, evidence that proposed strandline features are the product of lakeshore processes is lacking, with studies of similar features in nearby Victoria Valley showing they formed from post-glacial mass wasting (McKelvey et al. 2014). The only data driven study of strandline forming processes in the McMurdo Dry Valleys was conducted by Jones et al (1970), and found that strandlines in the regionare produced through ice contact compressing sediments along the lakes margin. The Canada Glacier, Commonwealth Glacier and Howard Glacier probably reached its shores, while other glaciers such as Crescent Glacier contributed runoff to Lake Washburn. The Ross Ice Sheet formed a subaqueous moraine in Lake Washburn. Some have proposed icebergs calving from the Ross Ice Sheet pushed the lake ice away and transported debris into the lake, where it generated ridges and mounds on the now exposed lakefloor. This lake ice conveyor hypothesis provides a mechanism for the deposition of glacial drift far away from a glaciers grounding line. However, GPR surveys of those features have been inconclusive regarding their origins, but suggest these proposed lake deposits were not simply draped over the underlying landscape, not supporting the depositional processes proposed by the lake ice conveyor hypothesis. Several have proposed the drift was deposited by the advance of the ice sheet itself into Taylor Valley instead of via lake ice conveyor (Toner et al 2013, Stone et al 2025, Denton et al 1989). Wind transported aeolian sediments into the lake.

=== Chronology and disappearance ===
The ice dam existed between 23,000-8,340 radiocarbon years ago and the extent of the lake fluctuated in response to climatic and glacier changes, but they are poorly documented. Evaporation appears to be responsible for the decrease in water levels at the beginning of the Holocene, after which it split into Lake Fryxell and Lake Hoare. It is possible that leftover ice from the Ross Ice Sheet delayed the decline of the lake for millennia, into the middle Holocene.

It left carbonates and lake sediments in the Taylor Valley; organic matter in these sediments constitutes an important component of and organic matter input the present-day soils in the valley while the presence of non-marine diatoms in the sediments demonstrates that they were not deposited by the sea. The Alpine I Drift from later glacial advances overlies the Lake Washburn deposits. Local springtail populations bear imprints of the former existence of the lake. Later water level fluctuations in the valleys could have caused the lakes to dry out and overspill.

== Geographical and climatic context ==
The McMurdo Dry Valleys are presently unglaciated, as the Transantarctic Mountains block glaciers and moisture from reaching the valleys. Despite mean temperatures of −30 – −14.8 °C (−22.0–5.4 °F), meltwater from glaciers supply fresh water to the valleys, where it forms closed lakes (lakes without an outflow) that are perennially ice-covered. During December and January, meltwater flows from the glaciers to the lakes. Occasionally, during summer strong winds blow from the Antarctic Ice Sheet through the valleys to the sea; these winds warm as they descend into the valleys and can melt the ice, causing water levels to rise.

There is evidence that during the Last Glacial Maximum, these lakes expanded in size despite drier and colder conditions; several different mechanisms ranging from more effective melting of glaciers during drought, increased temperatures, supply of subglacial water from the Ross Ice Shelf to more intense winds that warmed the valleys, inducing ice melt, have been proposed. The water in these lakes would have been prevented from discharging to the sea by the expanded Ross Ice Shelf, which at that time penetrated the valleys and blocked the outlet at Explorers Cove. Some of the lakes persisted into the Holocene; presumably their outlets were still blocked by glacier tills even after the ice had retreated at the beginning of the Holocene.

Precise dating of these paleolakes is rendered difficult, however, by the rarity of dateable deposits and the unreliability of radiocarbon dates due to reservoir effects. The existence of Lake Washburn appears to be secure; a proposal that a lake also existed in Victoria Valley was contested as being due to landslides rather than from a former lake. Present-day Lake Vanda may resemble the former Lake Washburn although it has a distinct diatom fauna.
