= Canada Peak =

Mountain in Ross Dependency, Antarctica

- Location within Antarctica

Highest point
- Elevation: 1,350 m (4,430 ft)
- Coordinates: 77°37′S 162°50′E

Geography
- Location: Taylor Valley, Victoria Land, Antarctica
- Parent range: Canada Glacier

Canada Peak is a sharp peak rising to 1,350 metres (4,430 ft) on the west side of Canada Glacier where it spills into Taylor Valley, Victoria Land. It was named by the New Zealand Geographic Board in 1998, in association with Canada Glacier.
