= Gurkha Peak =

Peak in Antarctica

Gurkha Peak (77°39′31″S 163°15′45″E) is a peak rising to about 900 metres (3,000 ft) between Crescent Glacier and Von Guerard Glacier on the north slope of the Kukri Hills, Victoria Land, Antarctica. It was named by the New Zealand Geographic Board in 1998, in association with the Kukri Hills and the Gurkha people, traditional users of the kukri (knife).
