= Karoro Pond =

Pond in Victoria Land, Antarctica

Karoro Pond (77°40′29″S 162°16′03″E) is a pond 0.8 nautical miles (1.5 km) north-northeast of Mount J. J. Thomson on the rock divide separating Matterhorn Glacier and Rhone Glacier in Victoria Land. It was named by the New Zealand Geographic Board in 1998 after the New Zealand gull of that name.
