= Scar Peak =

Mountain in Antarctica

Scar Peak (77°38′41″S 162°36′35″E) is a peak (1,882 metres (6,175 ft) high) surmounting the northern wall of Taylor Valley immediately east of the Lacroix Glacier in Victoria Land. It was named by the New Zealand Geographic Board in 1998 after the Scientific Committee on Antarctic Research (SCAR).
