= Lake Hoare =

Lake in Antarctica

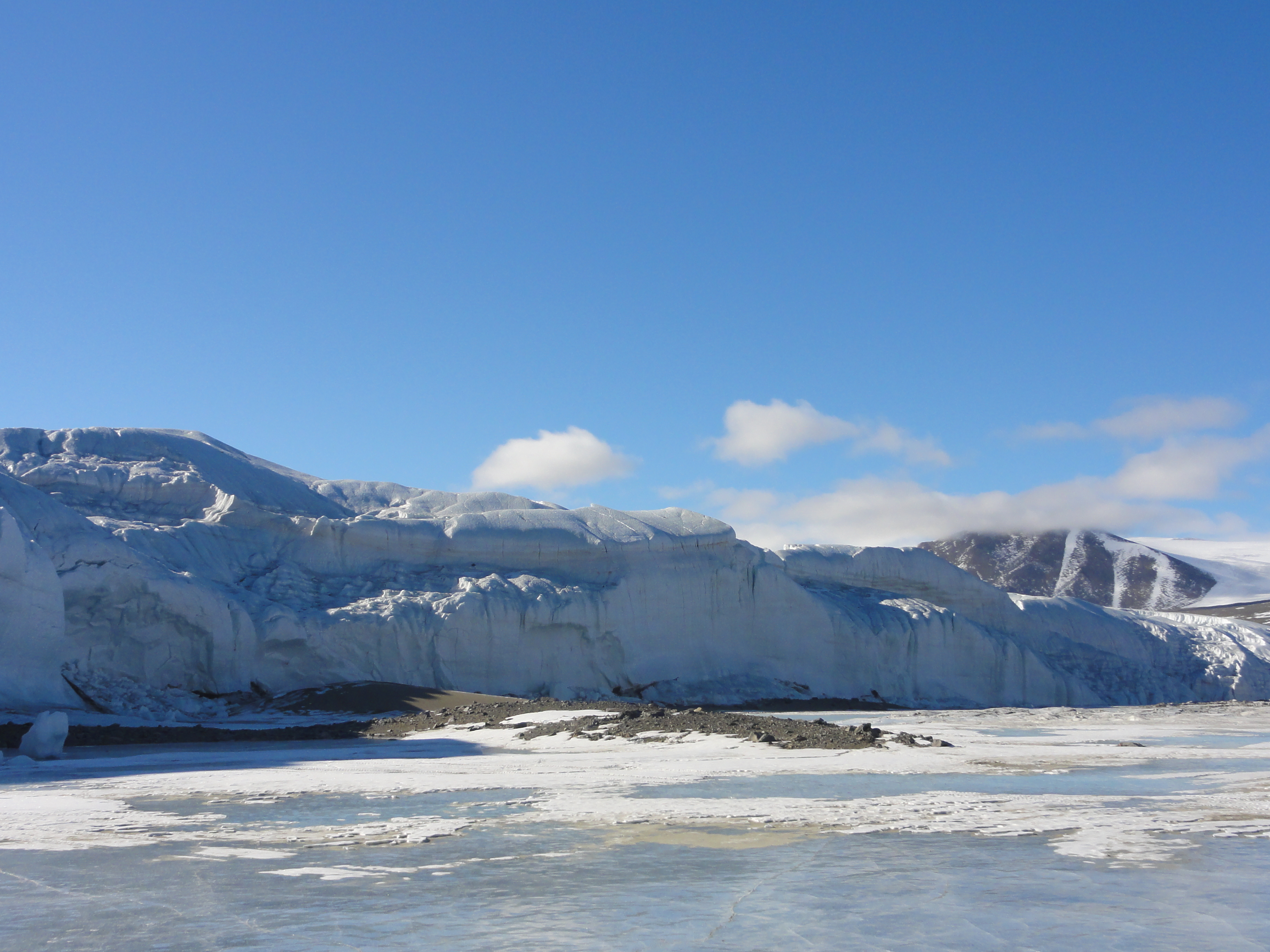
- Lake Hoare in 2014

- Location within Antarctica
- Location: Taylor Valley, Victoria Land, Antarctica
- Coordinates: 77°38′S 162°52′E
- Type: Endorheic
- Primary inflows: Andersen Creek, overflow from Lake Chad
- Primary outflows: none
- Basin countries: (Antarctica)
- Max. length: 4.2 km (2.6 mi)
- Max. width: 1 km (0.62 mi)
- Surface area: 1.94 km^{2} (0.75 mi^{2})
- Average depth: 9 m (30 ft)
- Max. depth: 34 m (112 ft)
- Water volume: 17,500,000 m^{3} (620,000,000 cu ft)
- Surface elevation: 73 m (240 ft)
- Islands: a few

Lake Hoare is a lake about 4.2 kilometres (2.6 mi) long between Lake Chad and Canada Glacier in Taylor Valley, Victoria Land, Antarctica. Its surface area measures 1.94 square kilometres (0.75 sq mi). The lake was named by the 8th Victoria University of Wellington Antarctic Expedition (VUWAE), 1963–64, for physicist Ray A. Hoare, a member of the VUWAE that examined lakes in Taylor, Wright, and Victoria Valleys.

Lake Hoare is dammed by the tongue of Canada Glacier, otherwise it would drain into Lake Fryxell, 3 kilometres (1.9 mi) northeast across the glacier tongue. Lake Chad, only 5 metres (5.5 yd) southeast of Lake Hoare, sometimes overflows into Lake Hoare.
