= Diane McKnight =

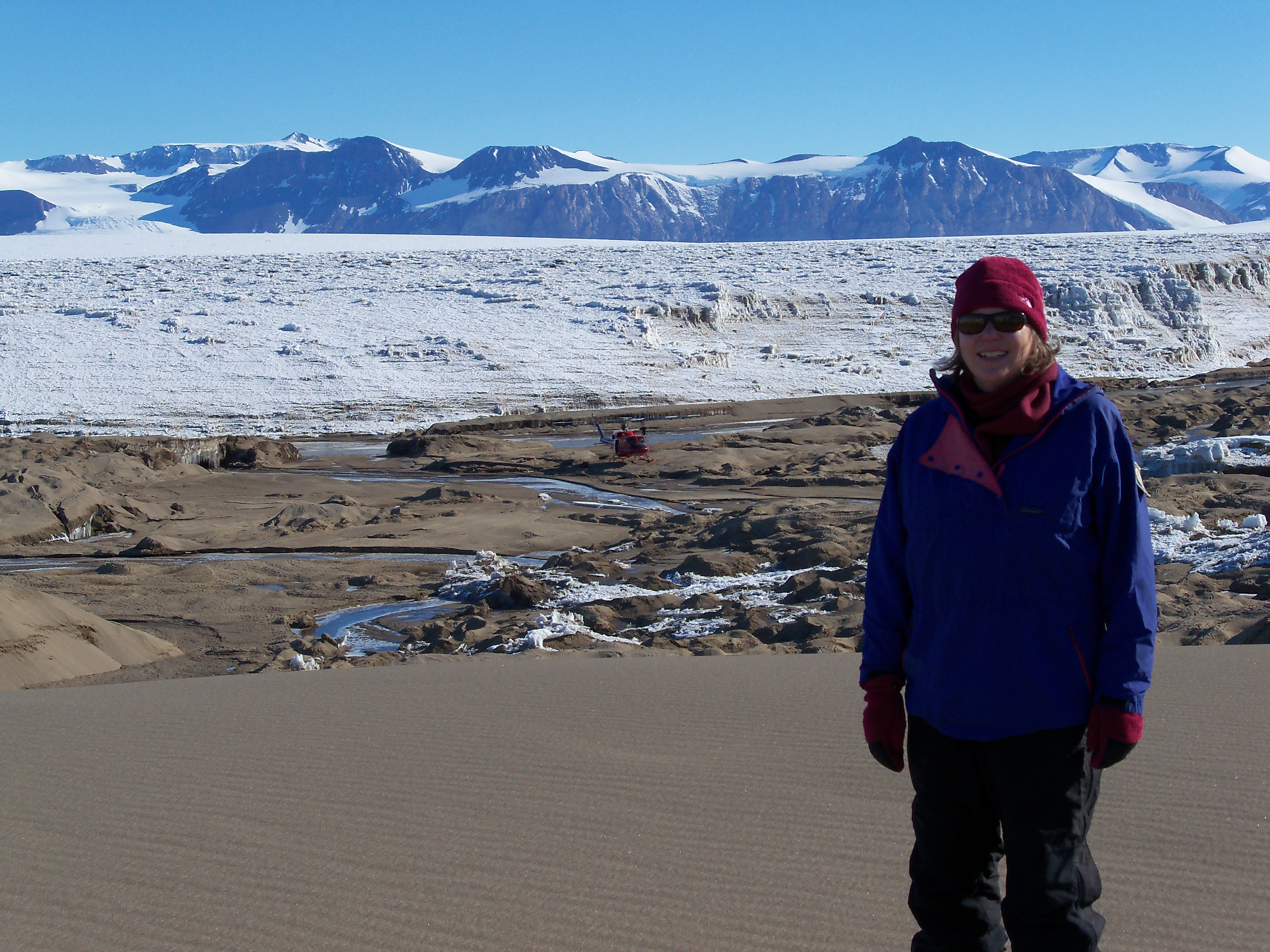
- Diane McKnight in the McMurdo Dry Valleys
- Born: March 22, 1953 (age 73)
- Education: Massachusetts Institute of Technology (BS, MS, PhD)
- Awards: Fellow, American Association for the Advancement of Science
- Scientific career
- Fields: Limnology; Biogeochemistry
- Workplaces: University of Colorado Boulder
- Website: instaar.colorado.edu/people/diane-m-mcknight/

Diane McKnight (born March 22, 1953) is a distinguished professor of civil, environmental, and architectural engineering at the University of Colorado Boulder and a fellow at the Institute of Arctic and Alpine Research (INSTAAR). McKnight is a founding principal investigator of the National Science Foundation's Long-Term Ecological Research (LTER) program in the McMurdo Dry Valleys of Antarctica.

== Early life and education ==
McKnight received a BS in mechanical engineering (1975), MS in civil engineering (1978), and her PhD in environmental engineering in 1979, all from Massachusetts Institute of Technology.

== Career and impact ==
After completing her graduate studies, McKnight began working for the US Geological Survey (USGS) as a research scientist for the Water Resources Division. As part of her work with USGS, she conducted research on lakes in the blast zone of Mount St. Helens in 1980.

In 1996, McKnight transitioned to the University of Colorado Boulder, where she became one of the founding principal investigators of the McMurdo Dry Valleys Long Term Ecological Research Program in Antarctica's McMurdo Dry Valleys. While continuing to conduct extensive research in Antarctica, she also conducts research in the Rocky Mountains, where she develops interactions with state and local groups involved in mine drainage and watershed issues. In total McKnight has authored or co-authored over 300 publications.

McKnight has been nationally and internationally recognized for her "seminal" and "visionary" contributions to Antarctic science. McKnight Creek in Taylor Valley, Victoria Land is named after her. She is also responsible for naming Antarctic features, including Furlong Creek.

Her contributions to major scientific institutions include service on several National Research Council committees; service on the Water, Science and Technology Board and the Polar Research Board; and tenure as president of the American Geophysical Union Biogeosciences section. In 2015 she was awarded CU-Boulder's Distinguished Research Lectureship, and in 2021, McKnight was recognized as a Distinguished Professor by the University of Colorado Boulder. McKnight also was founding editor of the Journal of Geophysical Research: Biogeosciences.

== Awards and honors ==
- Distinguished Professor, University of Colorado Boulder, 2021
- Robert E. Horton Medal, American Geophysical Union, 2021
- John Dalton Medal, European Geosciences Union, 2015
- Distinguished Research Lectureship, CU-Boulder, 2015
- Hydrologic Science Award, American Geophysical Union, 2014
- Elected member, National Academy of Engineering, 2012
- Fellow of the American Association for the Advancement of Science, 2009
- Walter B. Langbein Lectureship, American Geophysical Union, 2005
- Fellow, American Geophysical Union, 2004
- Meritorious Service Award, U.S. Geological Survey, 1995

== Selected works ==
- McKnight, Diane M., et al. "Spectrofluorometric characterization of dissolved organic matter for indication of precursor organic material and aromaticity". Limnology and Oceanography. 46.1 (2001): 38–48.
- Aiken, George R., et al. Humic Substances in Soil, Sediment, and Water: Geochemistry, Isolation and Characterization. John Wiley & Sons, 1985.
- Tranvik, Lars J., et al. "Lakes and reservoirs as regulators of carbon cycling and climate". Limnology and Oceanography. 54.6 part 2 (2009): 2298–2314.
