= Lizotte Creek =

Lizotte Creek (77°42′S 162°29′E) is a meltwater stream, 2,000 metres (2,200 yd) long, flowing southeastwards from the extreme southwestern tip of Matterhorn Glacier to the northeast end of Lake Bonney in Taylor Valley, Victoria Land, Antarctica. It was named by the Advisory Committee on Antarctic Names in 1996 after Michael P. Lizotte, a biologist at the University of Wisconsin–Oshkosh, who studied algal physiology and ecology in perennially ice-covered lakes in the McMurdo Dry Valleys area from 1985 to 2008.
