= Lyons Creek (Antarctica) =

Meltwater stream in Taylor Valley, Victoria Land, Antarctica

Lyons Creek (77°44′S 162°17′E) is a meltwater stream, 1,500 metres (1,600 yd) long, flowing northeast along the south side of Taylor Glacier into the west end of Lake Bonney in Taylor Valley, Victoria Land, Antarctica. It was named by the Advisory Committee on Antarctic Names in 1996 after geologist William Berry Lyons, of the University of Alabama, who studied the geochemistry and paleolimnology of the streams and lakes of the McMurdo Dry Valleys from 1985.
