= Lyon Creek (Kansas) =

Stream in Kansas, U.S.

Coordinates: 38.979166°N 96.844731°W

Lyon Creek is a stream in Geary, Dickinson and Marion counties, Kansas, in the United States.

Lyon Creek was named in the 1850s for Capt. Nathaniel Lyon.

== See also ==
- List of rivers of Kansas
