= Linda Lizotte-MacPherson =

Canadian civil servant

President of the Canada Border Services Agency
- In office July 6, 2015 – December 2, 2016
- Preceded by: Luc Portelance
- Succeeded by: John Ossowski

Personal details
- Education: Carleton University; Queen's University

Linda Lizotte-MacPherson; Canadian public servant. She was the president of the Canada Border Services Agency from July 6, 2015, to December 2, 2016.

Lizotte-MacPherson is a graduate of Carleton University, where she earned a Bachelor of Commerce (honours) degree, and from Queen's University's Digital's Executive Development Program and finished the Board of Directors Program through the Institute of Corporate Directors. She was president of the Canada School of Public Service from October 2012 to July 2015. From October 2009 to October 2012, she was commissioner and chief executive officer of the Canada Revenue Agency. She was senior associate deputy minister of Human Resources and Skills Development Canada and chief operating officer for Service Canada. She was associate secretary of the Treasury Board from 2005 to 2008. She was also the first chief executive officer of the Canada Health Infoway Inc and chief information officer for the federal government from 1998 to 2000.
