= Lake Bonney (Antarctica) =

Lake in Antarctica

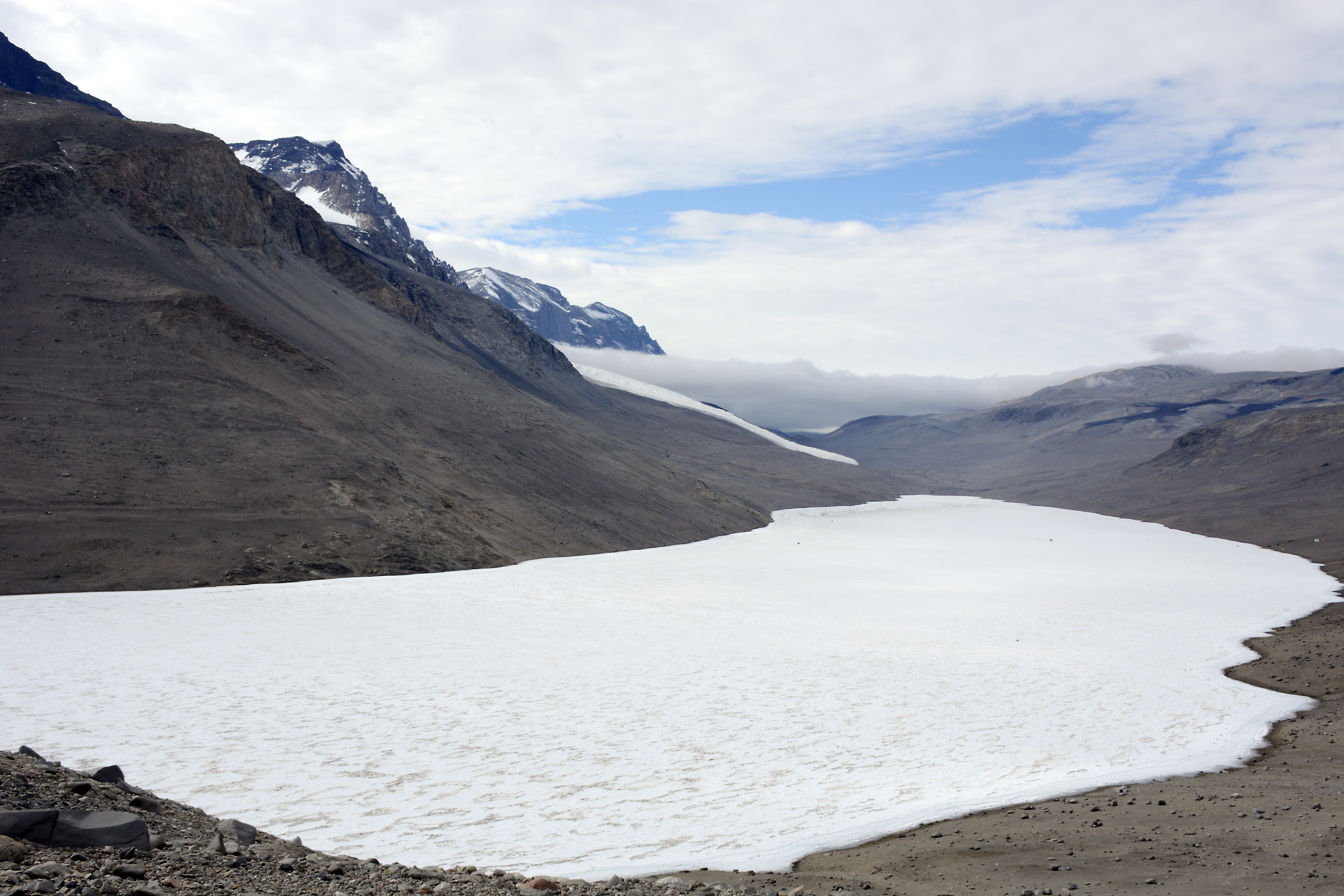
- Lake Bonney in 2015

- Location within Antarctica
- Location: Taylor Valley, Victoria Land, Antarctica
- Coordinates: 77°44′S 162°10′E
- Type: Saline, endorheic
- Primary inflows: Doran Stream/Priscu Stream, others
- Basin countries: Antarctica
- Max. length: 7 km (4.3 mi)
- Max. width: 0.9 km (0.56 mi)
- Surface area: 4.3 km^{2} (1.7 sq mi)
- Average depth: 15 m (49 ft)
- Max. depth: 40 m (130 ft)
- Water volume: 64,800,000 m^{3} (2.29×10^{9} cu ft)
- Surface elevation: 57 m (187 ft)
- Frozen: 2.8 to 4.5 m (9.2 to 14.8 ft)
- Settlements: Lake Bonney Hut

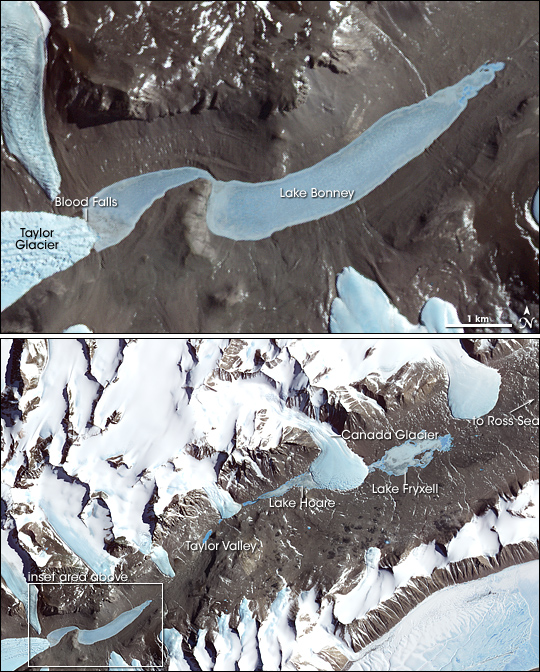
Satellite Image of area

Lake Bonney (77°43′S 162°22′E) is a saline lake with permanent ice cover at the western end of Taylor Valley in the McMurdo Dry Valleys of Victoria Land, Antarctica.

It is 7 kilometres (4.3 mi) long and up to 900 metres (3,000 ft) wide. A narrow channel only 50 metres (160 ft) wide (Lake Bonney at Narrows) separates the lake into East Lake Bonney (3.32 square kilometres [1.28 mi^{2}]) and West Lake Bonney (0.99 square kilometres [0.38 mi^{2}]).

To the north and south of the lake lie peaks that are over 1,500 metres (4,900 ft) above sea level, and the Taylor Glacier is positioned to the west of the lake. It is 130 feet (40 m) deep and is perpetually trapped under 12 to 15 feet (3.7 to 4.6 m) of ice.

It was first visited by the British National Antarctic Expedition of 1901–1904. It was named by the Robert Falcon Scott expedition of 1910–1913, for Thomas George Bonney, professor of geology at University College London, England from 1877 to 1901.

Lake Bonney is one of the main lakes studied by the National Science Foundations, McMurdo Long Term Ecological Research site.

Starting in 2007 NASA is funding an autonomous submersible robot called ENDURANCE to explore the water volume of the lake to study its shape and ecology. The robot is built by Stone Aerospace, who also developed the DEPTHX submersible. The Endurance Project is led by Peter Doran with Bill Stone and John Priscu among the co-investigators. Scientists have discovered an ancient ecosystem beneath the Taylor Glacier, next to Lake Bonney. This ecosystem survives by transforming sulfur and iron compounds for growth.

The work is seen as a stage in developing an autonomous submersible robot that could explore the ocean on Jupiter's moon Europa.

The green algae Chlamydomonas priscuii is endemic to this lake.

== Tributaries ==
Lake Bonney is fed by a number of meltwater streams:

- Bartlette Creek
- Bohner Stream
- Doran Stream (feeding Priscu Stream)
- Lawson Creek
- Lizotte Creek
- Lyons Creek
- Mason Creek
- Priscu Stream (the longest, 3.8 km (2 mi))
- Red River
- Santa Fe Stream
- Sharp Creek
- Vincent Creek

== See also ==
- Blood Falls, an outflow of the tip of the Taylor Glacier containing an iron oxide–tainted plume of melting salty water flowing onto the ice-covered surface of Lake Bonney
- Lake Washburn (Antarctica), a precursor lake
