= Furlong Creek (South Dakota) =

Stream in South Dakota, U.S.

Coordinates: 43°15′26″N 97°38′36″W

Furlong Creek is a stream in the U.S. state of South Dakota.

Furlong Creek has the name of Thomas Furlong, a pioneer who settled near it.

== See also ==
- List of rivers of South Dakota
