= Lake Fryxell =

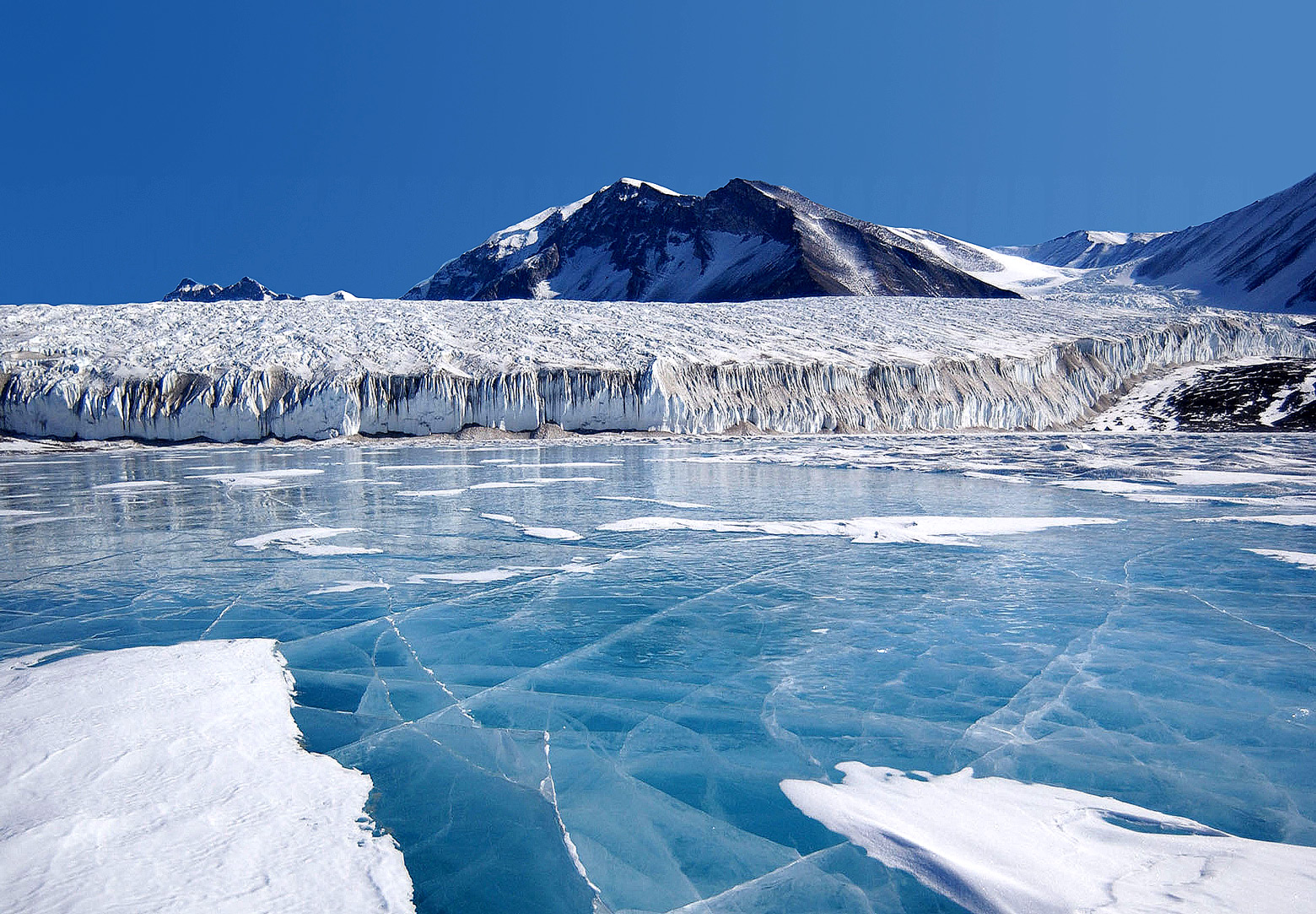
- Lake Fryxell

- Location within Antarctica
- Location: Taylor Valley, Victoria Land, Antarctica
- Coordinates: 77°37′S 163°11′E
- Lake type: Endorheic
- Primary inflows: Crescent Stream, Harnish Creek
- Primary outflows: none
- Catchment area: 230 km^{2} (89 mi^{2})
- Basin countries: (Antarctica)
- Max. length: 5.8 km (3.6 mi)
- Max. width: 2.1 km (1.3 mi)
- Surface area: 7.8 km^{2} (3.0 mi^{2})
- Average depth: 3.2 m (10 ft)
- Max. depth: 20 m (66 ft)
- Water volume: 25.2×10^{6} m^{3} (890×10^{6} cu ft)
- Surface elevation: 18 m (59 ft)
- Islands: moraine islands
- Settlements: Lake Fryxell Camp, Lake Fryxell Hut

Lake Fryxell is a perennially ice-covered lake in Taylor Valley in Victoria Land, Antarctica. One of many such lakes in the McMurdo Dry Valleys, it was first discovered in the early 1900s by Robert Scott's 1901-1904 expedition and was named and mapped during Operation Deep Freeze in the 1950s. The lake contains phytoplankton and some protozoa, with ecological production dominated by benthic microbial mats. The ice-cover persists year-round and is on average 5-4 m thick. Since 1992, Lake Fryxell has been part of the scope of the McMurdo Dry Valleys Long-Term Ecological Research Project, which maintains the weather station located at the lake.

== Geography and Hydrology ==
Lake Fryxell is located near the mouth of Taylor Valley, between Canada Glacier and Commonwealth Glaciers. It is 5.8 kilometres (3.6 mi) long and at most 2.1 kilometres (1.3 mi) wide, with a max depth of 20 metres (66 ft). Several streams, chiefly among them Canada Stream, flow into the lake on a seasonal basis, but the lake has no natural outflow. Water loss is primarily through ablation from the ice-cover, between 30 centimetres (12 in) and 40 centimetres (16 in).

The watershed contains thirteen streams flowing into the lake, forming a watershed that has an area roughly 230 km^{2} (89 mi^{2}) in size. Where a few of the streams enter the lake there are well-developed deltas. The streams flow for about 4–12 weeks out of the year. Nearly half of the water flowing into the lake comes from Canada, Lost Seal, and Von Guerard streams.

== Climate ==
Lake Fryxell is located within the McMurdo Dry Valleys, which experience an exceptionally dry climate partially due to katabatic winds descending from the nearby mountains. These winds can exceed 320 km/h (200 mph) under certain conditions and can raise the temperature, melting snow and evaporating water. Average precipitation in the area surrounding the valley is equivalent to about 3 cm (1.2 in) of rain a year and a mean annual temperature of −20 °C (−4 °F) with summer temperatures getting above freezing.

Climate data for Lake Fryxell, Antarctica, 1961–1990 normal
Month	Jan	Feb	Mar	Apr	May	Jun	Jul	Aug	Sep	Oct	Nov	Dec	Year
Daily mean °F (°C)	27.0 (−2.8)	16.2 (−8.8)	0.9 (−17.3)	−5.6 (−20.9)	−9.9 (−23.3)	−9.2 (−22.9)	−14.4 (−25.8)	−17.3 (−27.4)	−14.3 (−25.7)	−2.9 (−19.4)	14.5 (−9.7)	25.7 (−3.5)	0.9 (−17.3)
Average precipitation days (≥ 1mm)	2	4	3	4	5	5	4	4	3	3	2	2	41
Source: Norwegian Meteorological Institute

== Lake Fryxell Camp ==
Lake Fryxell Camp
- Camp
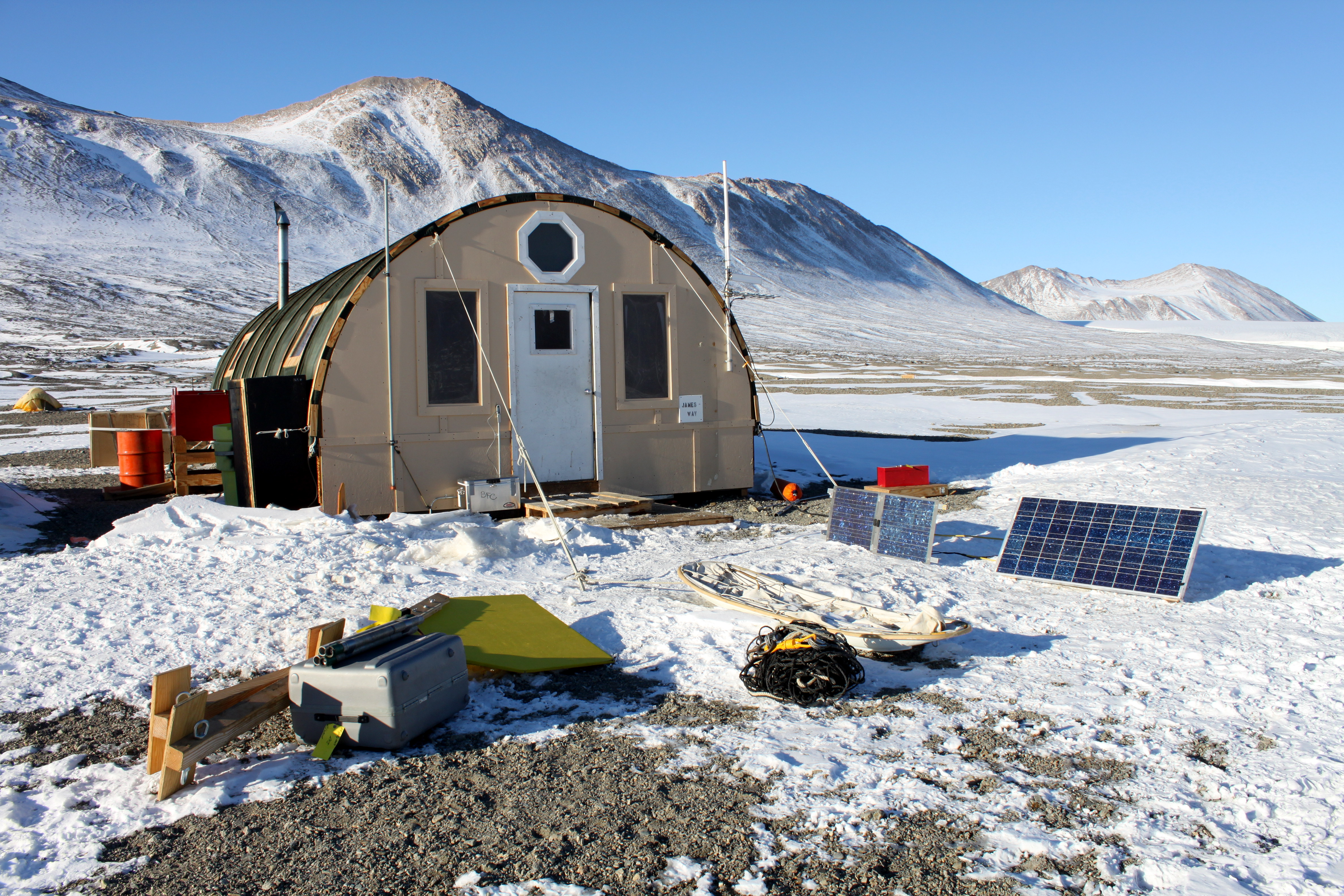
- One of the buildings located at the nearby camp.

- Location of Lake Fryxell Camp in Antarctica
- Coordinates: 77°36′21″S 163°07′32″E
- Country: United States
- Location in Antarctica: Lake Fryxell; Taylor Valley; Antarctica
- Established: 1984
- Type: Seasonal
- Status: Operational

Mapped by the British Antarctic Expedition under Robert Falcon Scott, the lake was visited by Professor T.L. Péwé during Operation Deep Freeze, 1957–58, who named it for Dr. Fritiof M. Fryxell, glacial geologist of Augustana College, Illinois.

Lake Fryxell is a focus of scientific research and contains a semi-permanent camp containing four labs and two other buildings. Electricity is generated at the camp using solar panels and a wind turbine. The four labs are used for experimenting with radioactive materials, electronics, chemicals and other materials. When staying at the camp, researchers sleep in tents, some of which are the same style as those used in some Antarctic expeditions in the early 20th century. There is internet and phone access at the camp.

Research activities largely deal with the lake itself and can include scientists diving into the water. The camp has existed since at least 1984.

== Ecology ==
There are multiple forms of algae within the lake, including a sizable population of sulfate-reducing bacteria. Some samples of these bacteria live in very specific areas, such as specific water depths or locations causing them to experience differing physiochemical conditions. There are also a few archaea living in the anoxic zone, that contribute to the methane pockets under 12 m below the surface.

There is a lack of oxygen within Lake Fryxell, which is unique when compared to other lakes in the region because the euphotic zone only extends to 9 metres (30 ft) below the lake surface. This creates an environment similar to the planet about 2.4 billion years ago. Within anoxic areas, scientists have found microbial mats that create small pockets saturated with oxygen.

== See also ==
- Andrews Creek
- Coral Ridge
- List of Antarctic field camps
- Lake Washburn (Antarctica)
