= Canada Glacier =

Polar glacier in Antarctica

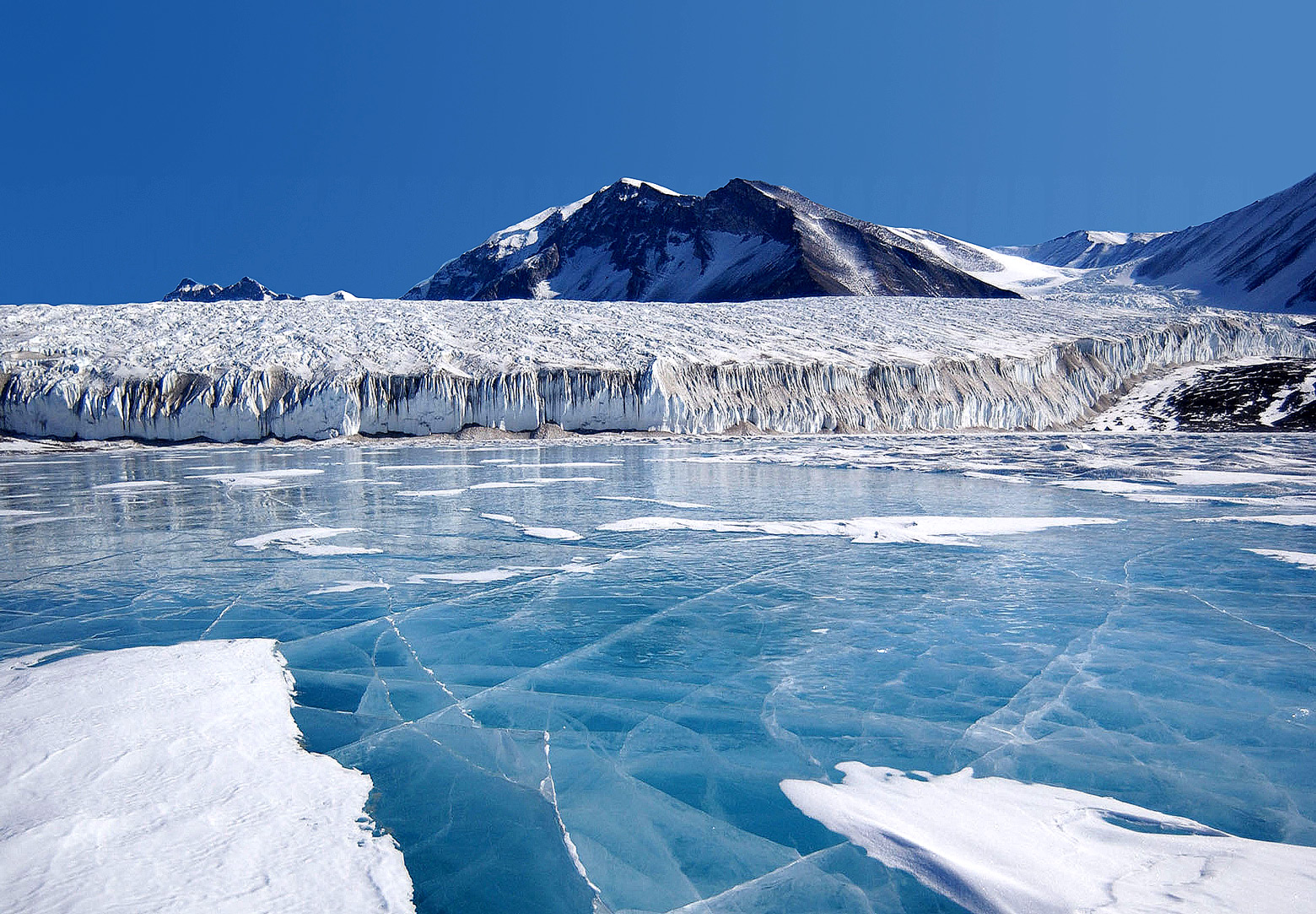
- Canada Glacier in December 2002

- Location within Antarctica
- Location: Victoria Land
- Coordinates: 77°37′S 162°59′E
- Thickness: unknown
- Terminus: Lake Hoare; Lake Fryxell
- Status: unknown

Canada Glacier is a small glacier flowing south-east into the northern side of Taylor Valley in Victoria Land, Antarctica. It is in the Ross Dependency. Its melting season is in the summer.

== Description ==
The glacier receives less than 10 cm of snowfall annually, and is (technically) an ecosystem. Its seasonal melting feeds Lake Hoare to the west and Lake Fryxell to the east. At the north side of its head sit the Hothem Cliffs.

== History ==
The glacier was discovered and named in the course of the Terra Nova Expedition (1910–1913), under Robert Scott. Charles S. Wright, a Canadian physicist, was a member of the party that explored the area.

== Antarctic Specially Protected Area ==
An area of about 1 km^{2} on the eastern side of the glacier is protected under the Antarctic Treaty System as Antarctic Specially Protected Area (ASPA) No.131 because it contains some of the richest plant growth (bryophytes and algae) in the McMurdo Dry Valleys region. It is exceptionally important not only for its ecological and biological values, but also as a reference site for other similar ecosystems. The site comprises sloping ice-free ground with summer ponds and meltwater streams. It is unusual in receiving more consistent water flows than many other parts of the Dry Valleys region, and is sheltered from strong winds by the 20 m high glacier face.

== See also ==
- Canada Peak
- List of glaciers in the Antarctic
- Glaciology
