= Kukri Hills =

Hill chain in Antarctica

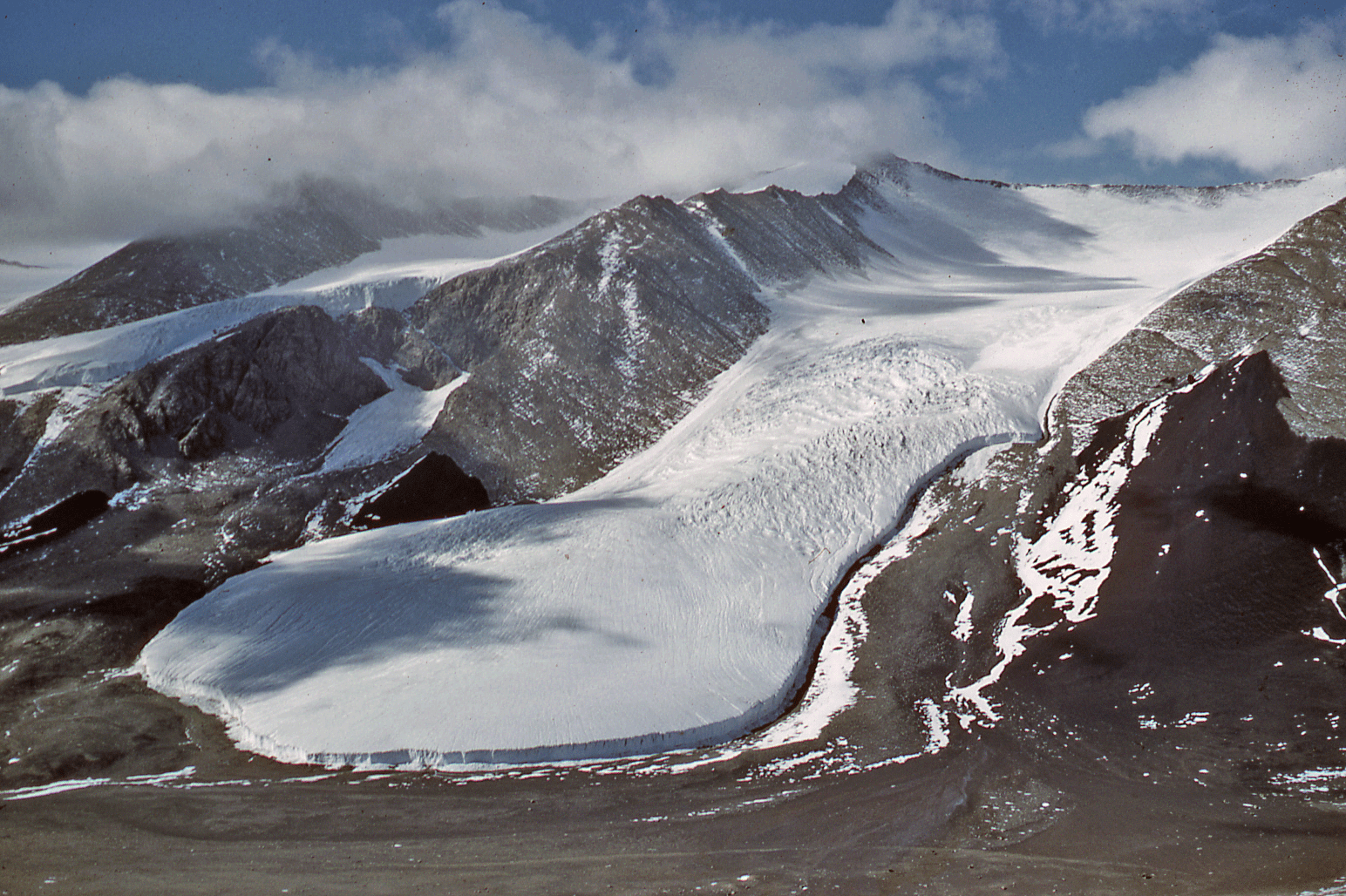
- Sollas Glacier

Highest point
- Elevation: 2,000 m (6,600 ft)
- Coordinates: 77°44′S 162°42′E

Geography
- Location within Antarctica
- Continent: Antarctica
- Region: Victoria Land

Kukri Hills (77°44′S 162°42′E) is a prominent east-west trending range, about 25 nautical miles (46 km) long and over 2,000 metres (6,600 ft) high, forming the divide between Ferrar Glacier on the south and Taylor Glacier and Taylor Valley on the north, in Victoria Land, Antarctica. They are south of the Asgard Range, east of the Quartermain Mountains and north of the Royal Society Range.

The hills were discovered by the Discovery Expedition (1901–04) and probably so named because its shape resembles that of the Kukri, a Gurkha knife.

== Topography ==
The western tip of the Kukri Hills is Mount Brearley, where the Taylor Glacier separates from the Ferrar Glacier, with the Taylor Glacier flowing north east and the Ferrar glacier flowing southeast. The hills stretch east with, with prominent peaks from west to east including Mount Coates, Sentinel Peak, Bonney Riegel, Nussbaum Regel, Andrew's Ridge, and Mount Barnes where the hills terminate in New Harbor. The Taylor Glacier and Taylor Valley run along the north side, while the Ferrar Glacier runs along the south side. There are several small glaciers in the hills, including Borns Glacier, Calkin Glacier, Hughes Glacier, Sollas Glacier, Marr Glacier, Calamon Glacier, Howard Glacier, Crescent Glacier and Wales Glacier.

== Features ==
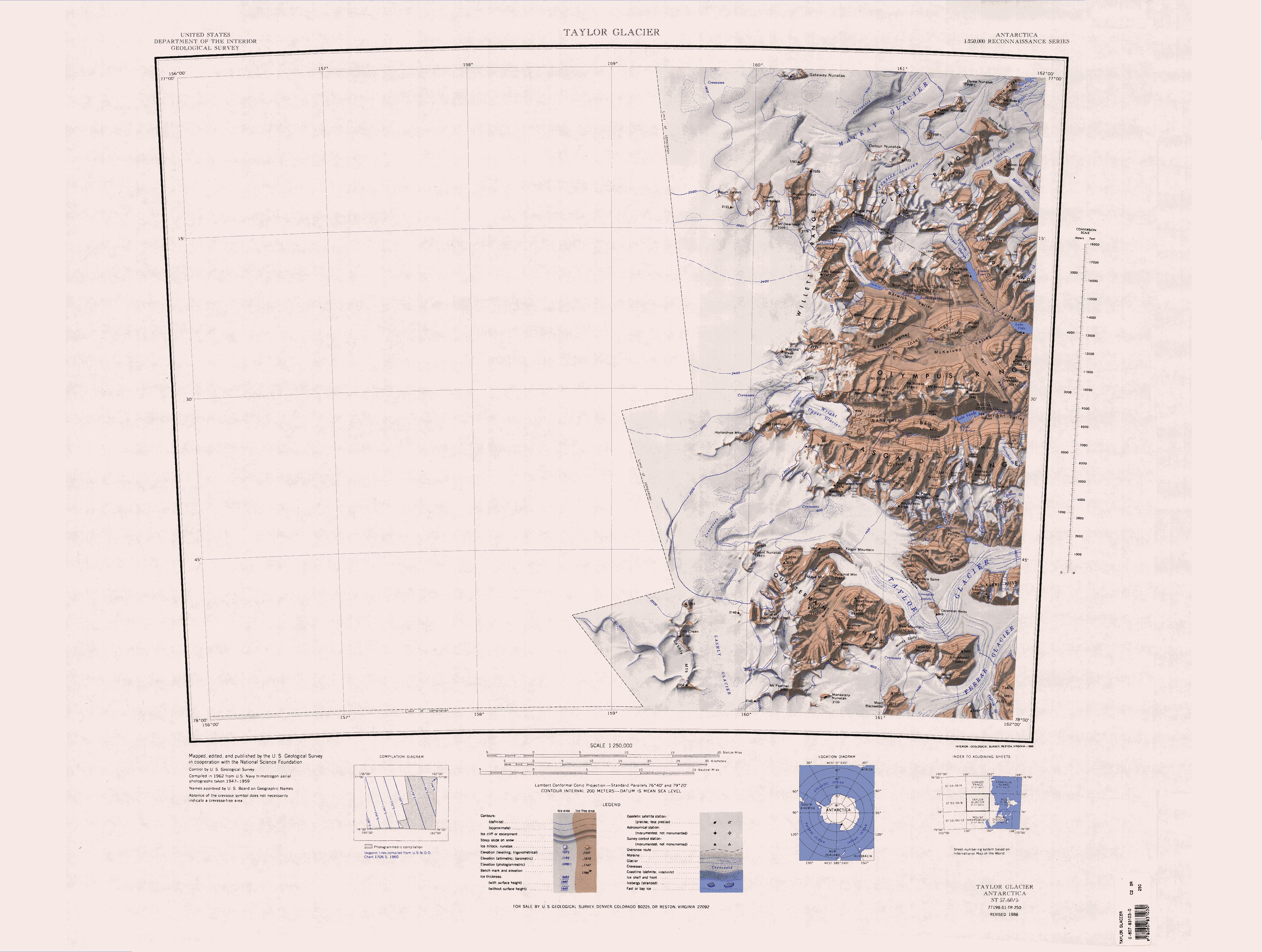
Western tips of the hills (lower right)

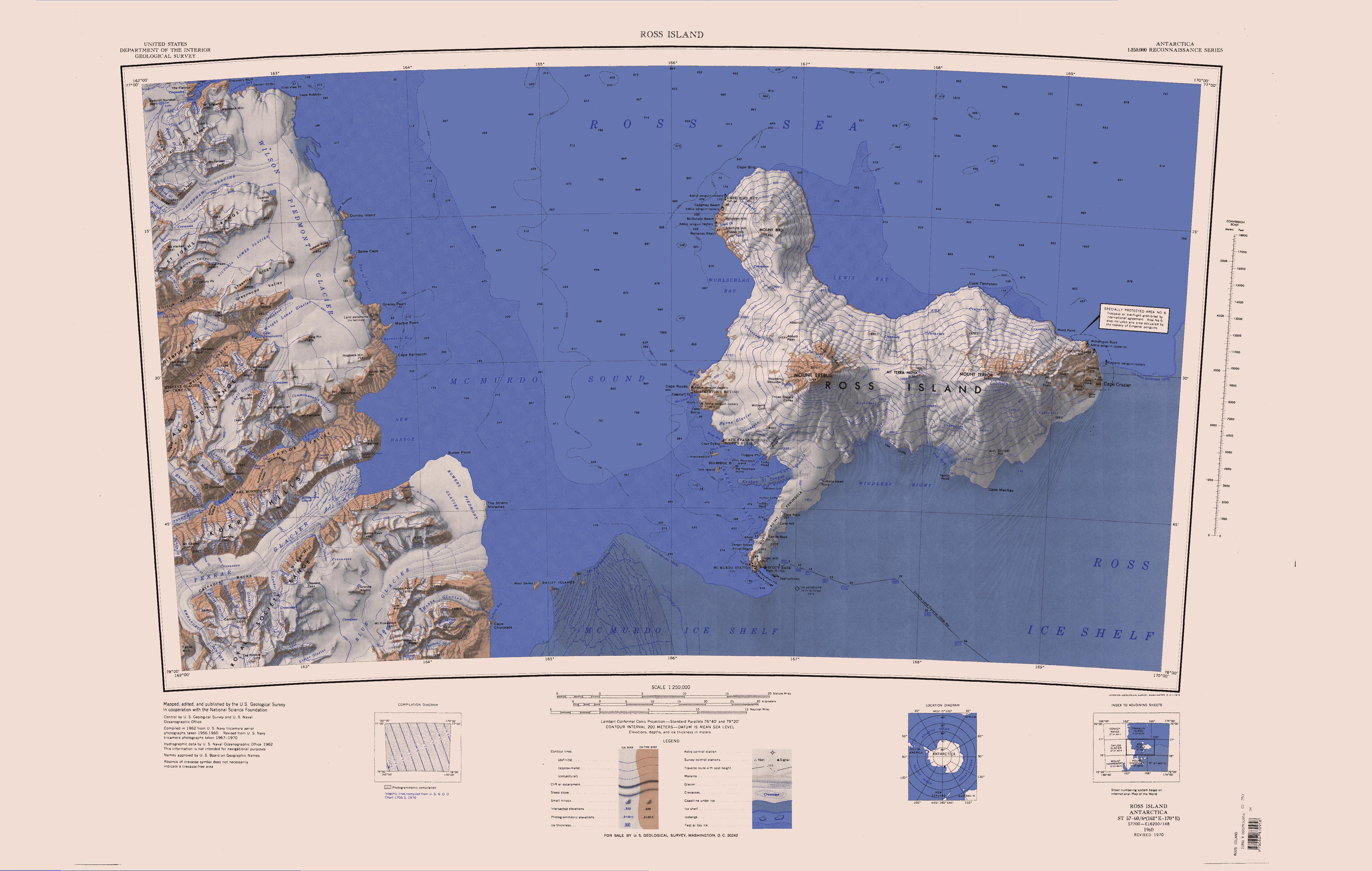
Eastern section of the hills (center of map)

Peaks and other features, from west to east, include:

=== Elevation Point ===
77°48′S 161°39′E. A bold rock point which forms the west end of Kukri Hills, overlooking Taylor Glacier. The name is one of a group in the area associated with surveying applied by NZGB in 1993.

=== Eyeglass Cirque ===
77°48′S 161°57′E A cirque 2 miles (3 km) east of South America Glacier on the southern cliffs of the Kukri Hills. The name is one of a group in the area associated with surveying applied in 1993 by the New Zealand Geographic Board; "eyeglass" refers to the eyepiece of a surveying telescope.

=== Mount Brearley ===
77°48′S 161°45′E. A sharp peak, 2,010 metres (6,590 ft) high, which is the westernmost summit of the Kukri Hills. Named by the Western Journey Party, led by Thomas Griffith Taylor, of the British Antarctic Expedition, 1910–13.

=== Mount Coates ===
77°48′S 162°05′E Peak, 2,060 metres (6,760 ft) high, just east of Borns Glacier in the Kukri Hills. Named by the Western Journey Party, led by Taylor, of the BrAE, 1910–13.

=== Sentinel Peak ===
77°47′S 162°23′E. A conspicuous, pointed peak over 2,000 metres (6,600 ft) high, standing at the north side of Ferrar Glacier and forming the highest point in the south-central part of the Kukri Hills. Discovered and named by the Discovery expedition 1901–04 under Scott.

=== Duff Peak ===
77°47′S 162°27′E. A peak 1 nautical mile (1.9 km; 1.2 mi) east-southeast of Sentinel Peak, rising to 1,945 metres (6,381 ft) at the head of Hughes Glacier in Kukri Hills. Named in 1992 by US-ACAN after Roger S. Duff (d. 1978), for 30 years director of the Canterbury Museum, Christchurch, New Zealand. To celebrate the Museum's centenary in 1970, a Hundredth Anniversary Wing was planned which would incorporate a National Antarctic Exhibition, Research and Reference Center. A landmark of Dr. Duff's administration, the Antarctic wing was opened on March 4, 1977.

=== Koi Peak ===
77°44′00″S 162°42′00″E Koi Peak is a peak rising to about 1,700 metres (5,600 ft) at the intersection of the ridges at the head of Doran Glacier in the Kukri Hills of Victoria Land in Antarctica. Koi is a Māori name given by the New Zealand Geographic Board in 1998, meaning "sharp" peak.

=== Rahi Peak ===
77°44′S 162°49′E. A prominent mountain rising to 1,830 m (6,000 ft) between the head of Moa Glacier and Goldman Glacier. The word "rahi" is Māori in origin, meaning "big". The name was applied by the New Zealand Geographic Board (NZGB) in 1998.

=== Young Hill ===
77°38′S 163°26′E. An ice-free hill about 3,300 ft (1,000 m) high, 1 mi (1.6 km) northeast of Hallam Peak. It was named by the New Zealand Geographic Board (NZGB) in 1998 for New Zealand ornithologist Euan C. Young, whose Antarctic research spanned 30 years, beginning in the 1959–60 field season.

=== Hallam Peak ===
77.648245°S 163.383422°E. A distinctive rock peak in the Kukri Hills. The peak rises to 900 metres (3,000 ft) between the heads of Von Guerard Glacier and Aiken Glacier and provides an unobstructed view of the Lake Fryxell locality of Taylor Valley. Named by Advisory Committee on Antarctic Names (US-ACAN) (1997) after Dr. Cheryl A. Hallam, geographer, U.S. Geological Survey (USGS), who specializes in geographic information systems; worked four summer seasons in Antarctica, 1994–95, 1995–96, 1996–97 and 1999–00.

=== Mount Barnes ===
77°38′S 163°35′E. A peak, 985 metres (3,232 ft) high, surmounting the west-central side of New Harbour and marking the east end of the Kukri Hills. Discovered by the Discovery expedition, 1901–04, under Robert Falcon Scott, and named New Harbour Heights. It was renamed Mount Barnes after a Canadian ice physicist by Scott's second expedition, the British Antarctic Expedition, 1910–13.

== Glaciers ==
There are a number of small glaciers, mostly flowing north towards Taylor Valley. Most do not reach the valley floor. From west to east they are:

=== South America Glacier ===
77°49′S 161°47′E. Small glacier near the southwest corner of the Kukri Hills. The ice hangs down a cliff 2,000 m high, and takes a form similar to the continent for which it is named. Named by the Western Journey Party, led by Taylor, of the BrAE, 1910–13.

=== Borns Glacier ===
77°47′S 162°01′E. Glacier immediately W of Mount Coates, flowing north from the Kukri Hills. Charted by the BrAE under Scott, 1910–13. Named by the US-ACAN for Harold W. Borns, Jr., USARP geologist who made investigations in the area during 1960–61.

=== Hughes Glacier ===
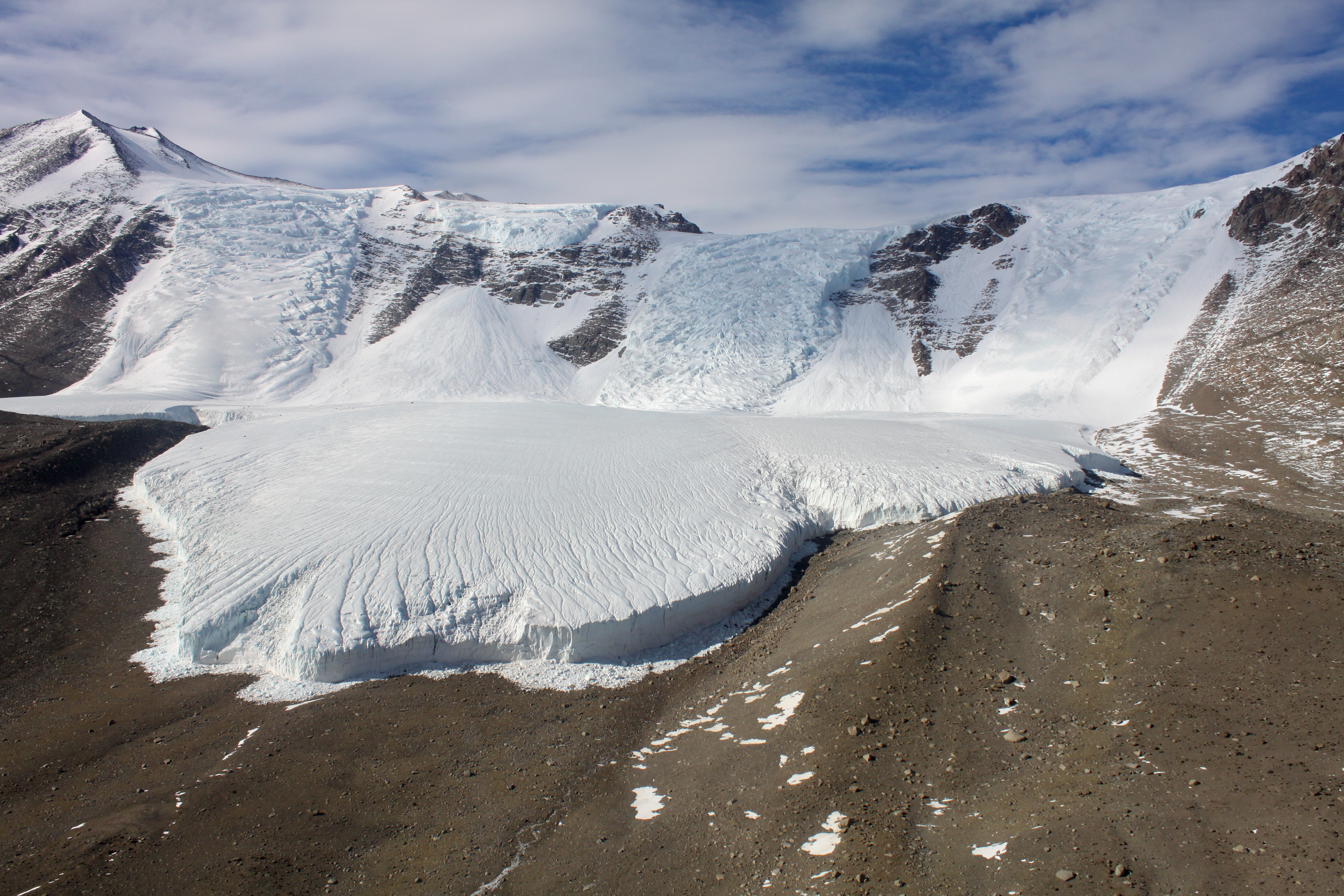
Hughes Glacier in 2009

77°44′S 162°27′E. Small alpine glacier flowing toward Lake Bonney in Taylor Valley from the Kukri Hills on the south, in Victoria Land. Mapped by the Western Geological Party led by Taylor of the BrAE (1910–13) and named for Prof. McKenny Hughes, geologist, of Cambridge.

=== Sollas Glacier ===
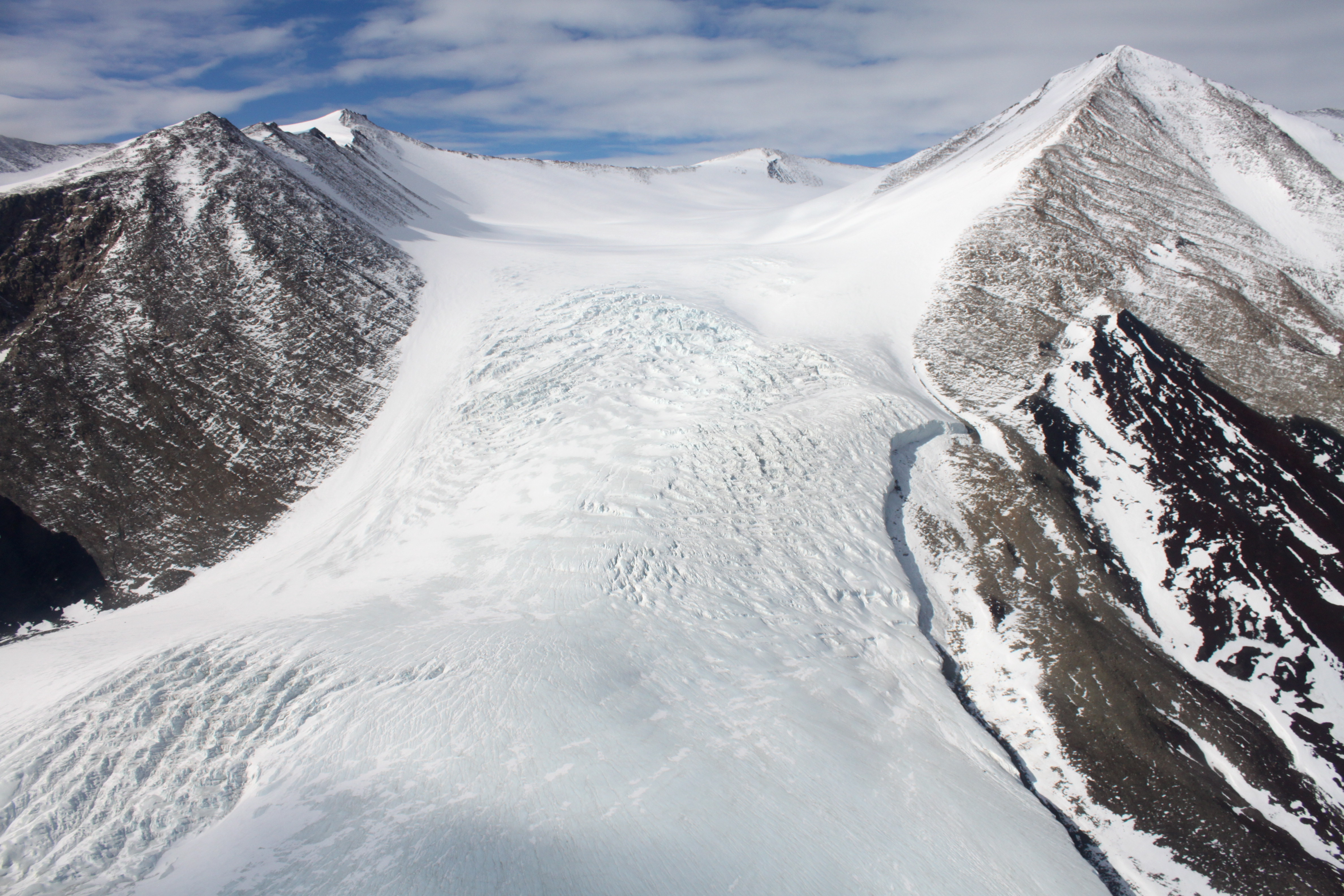
Sollas Glacier in 2009

77°43′S 162°36′E. Glacier between Marr and Hughes Glaciers, flowing from the Kukri Hills toward the east end of Lake Bonney in Taylor Valley. Charted and named by the BrAE under Scott, 1910–13, for William J. Sollas, professor of geology at Oxford.

=== Marr Glacier ===
77°43′S 162°44′E. Glacier 2 nautical miles (3.7 km; 2.3 mi) west of Goldman Glacier, flowing north from the Kukri Hills into Taylor Valley. Charted by the BrAE under Scott, 1910–13, who it appears also applied the name.

=== Moa Glacier ===
77.714888°S 162.790511°E. A valley glacier between Marr Glacier and Goldman Glacier in Kukri Hills. It flows north into Taylor Valley but terminates midway down the south wall of the valley. Named by New Zealand Geographic Board (NZGB) (1998) after an extinct New Zealand bird.

=== Goldman Glacier ===
77°42′S 162°51′E. Glacier 2 nautical miles (3.7 km; 2.3 mi) east of Marr Glacier, flowing north from the Kukri Hills into Taylor Valley. Named by the US-ACAN for USARP biologist Charles R. Goldman, who made studies in the area in the 1962–63 season.

=== Kitticarrara Glacier ===
77°43′S 163°02′E. Short, steep glacier 1 nautical mile (1.9 km; 1.2 mi) south of Howard Glacier in the Kukri Hills, flowing east-southeast into Ferrar Glacier. }Named by the Western Journey Party, led by Taylor, of the BrAE, 1910–13. The name was suggested by F. Debenham after a sheep station in New South Wales.

=== Howard Glacier ===
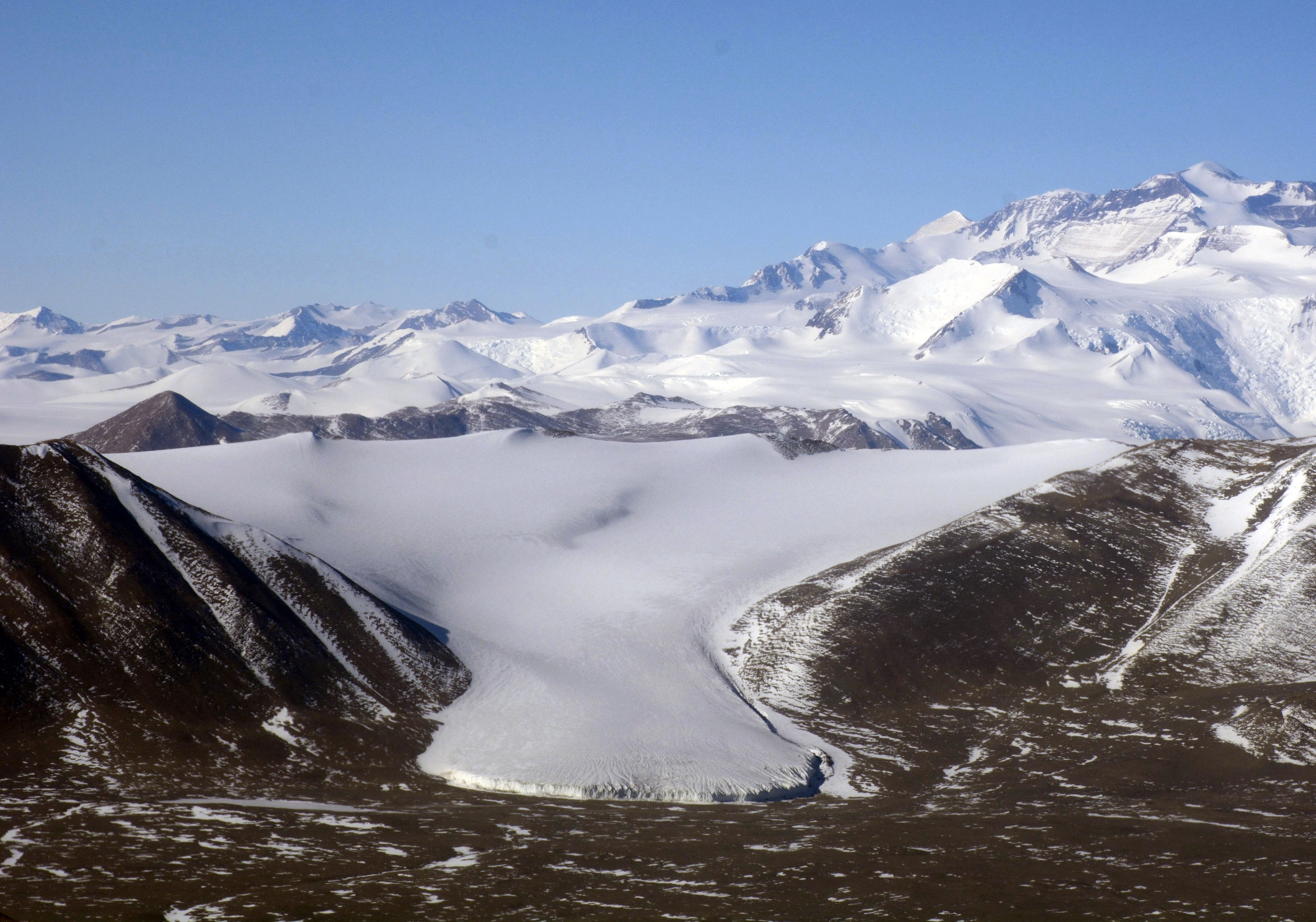
Howard Glacier in 2014

77°40′S 163°05′E. Small alpine glacier just west of Crescent Glacier, flowing into Taylor Valley on the north from the Kukri Hills. The glacier was studied in December 1957 by U.S. geologist T.L. Péwé, who named it for Arthur D. Howard, geomorphologist of Stanford University, and glaciologist in Antarctica during USN OpHjp, 1946–47.

=== Crescent Glacier ===
77°40′S 163°14′E. Small alpine glacier just east of Howard Glacier in the Kukri Hills, flowing north into Taylor Valley. The glacier was studied by U.S. geologist Troy L. Péwé in December 1957, and was so named by him because of its crescent shape when viewed from the floor of Taylor Valley.

=== Von Guerard Glacier ===
77.653297°S 163.339621°E. A glacier between Crescent Glacier and Aiken Glacier on the north slope of Kukri Hills. Named by Advisory Committee on Antarctic Names (US-ACAN) (1997) from association with Von Guerard Creek, which flows N from this glacier into Taylor Valley.

=== Aiken Glacier ===
77.637907°S 163.405679°E. A small glacier between Von Guerard Glacier and Wales Glacier on the N slope of Kukri Hills. Named by the Advisory Committee on Antarctic Names (US-ACAN) (1997) from association with Aiken Creek, which flows north from this glacier into Taylor Valley.

=== Wales Glacier ===
77°37′S 163°31′E. Short alpine glacier just west of Mount Barnes at the east end of the Kukri Hills. It drains north into Taylor Valley. Named.by the BrAE (1910–13) under Scott.

=== Dun Glacier ===
77°48′S 162°14′E. A short, steep tributary to the Ferrar Glacier. It descends the southern side of Kukri Hills midway between Mount Coates and Sentinel Peak. Named by the Western Journey Party led by Griffith Taylor of the BrAE (1910–13) under Scott.

=== Double Curtain Glacier ===
77°39′S 163°31′E. Small glacier on the south slope of the Kukri Hills, just southwest of Mount Barnes, flowing toward the mouth of Ferrar Glacier. Mapped by the BrAE under Scott, 1910–13, and so named by them because of its shape.

== Sources ==
- "Aiken Glacier", Geographic Names Information System, United States Geological Survey, United States Department of the Interior
- Alberts, Fred G., ed. (1995), Geographic Names of the Antarctic (PDF) (2 ed.), United States Board on Geographic Names This article incorporates public domain material from websites or documents of the United States Board on Geographic Names.
- "Hallam Peak", Geographic Names Information System, United States Geological Survey, United States Department of the Interior
- "Moa Glacier", Geographic Names Information System, United States Geological Survey, United States Department of the Interior
- "Rahi Peak", Geographic Names Information System, United States Geological Survey, United States Department of the Interior
- Ross Island, USGS: United States Geological Survey
- Taylor Glacier, USGS: United States Geological Survey
- "Von Guerard Glacier", Geographic Names Information System, United States Geological Survey, United States Department of the Interior
- "Young Hill", Geographic Names Information System, United States Geological Survey, United States Department of the Interior
- This article incorporates public domain material from websites or documents of the United States Geological Survey.
