= Taylor Valley =

Geographic feature in Antarctica

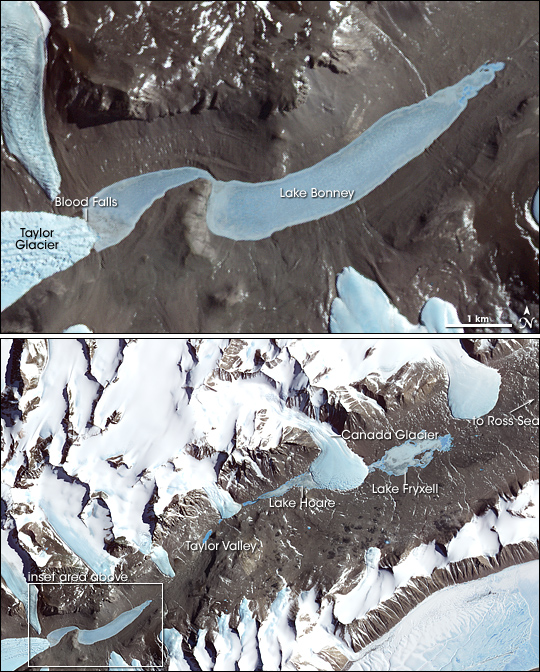
- Satellite image of the valley, with inset of Lake Bonney

- Location within Antarctica

Geography
- Location: Antarctica
- Coordinates: 77°37′S 163°00′E
- Interactive map of Taylor Valley

Taylor Valley (77°37′S 163°00′E) is an ice-free valley about 18 nautical miles (33 km; 21 mi) long, once occupied by the receding Taylor Glacier. It lies north of the Kukri Hills between the Taylor Glacier and New Harbour in Victoria Land, Antarctica. Taylor Valley is the southernmost of the three large McMurdo Dry Valleys in the Transantarctic Mountains, located west of McMurdo Sound.

== Exploration and naming ==
The Taylor Valley was discovered by the British National Antarctic Expedition (BrNAE, 1901–1904). It was more fully explored by the British Antarctic Expedition, 1907–1909 (BrAE) and the British Antarctic Expedition, 1910–1913. It was named after the Taylor Glacier.

== Geology ==
In the oblique aerial photo at right, the tan bands are sandstone layers from the Beacon Supergroup, a series of sedimentary rock layers formed at the bottom of a shallow sea between 250 million and 400 million years ago. Throughout that period, Earth's southern continents were locked into the supercontinent Gondwana.

The dark band of rock that divides the sandstone is dolerite (sometimes called diabase), a volcanic rock that forms underground. The distinctive dolerite intrusion—or sill—is a remnant of a massive volcanic plumbing system that produced major eruptions about 180 million years ago. The eruptions likely helped tear Gondwana apart.

== Location ==
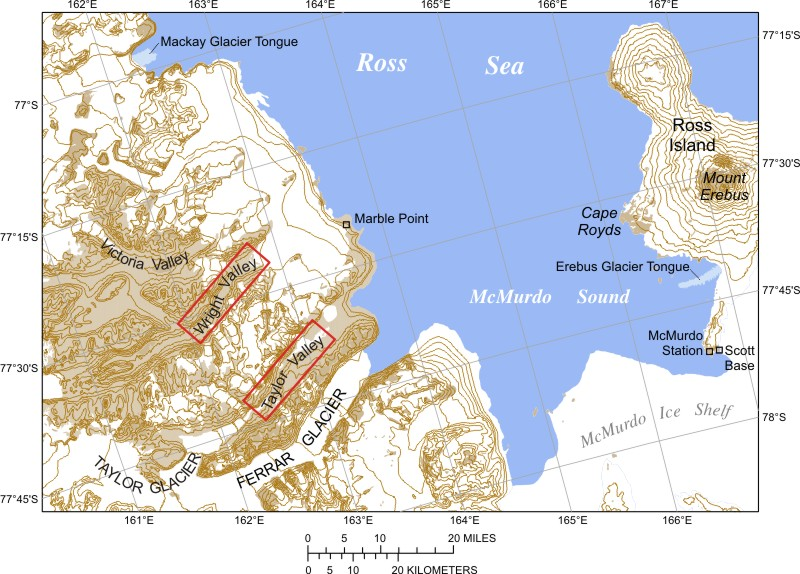
Map showing location of Taylor Valley

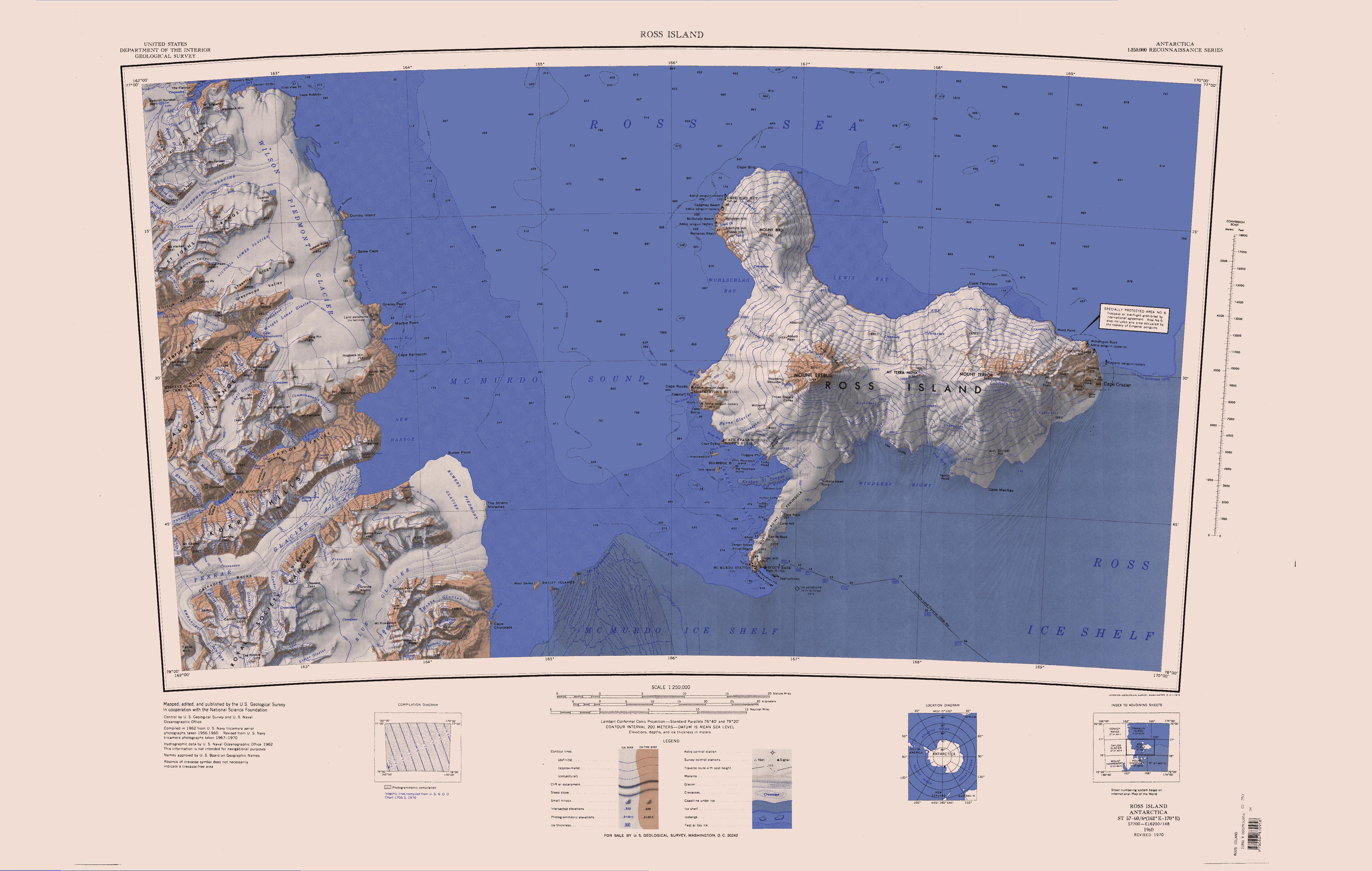
Taylor Valley in center of west of map, opposite Ross Island

Taylor Valley is one of the McMurdo Dry Valleys. Parts of the area were visited by British expeditions led by Captain Robert Falcon Scott (1901–1904 and 1910–1913), who referred to Taylor Valley, as well as Beacon Valley and Pyramid Trough (named later), as "dry valleys." It runs from the east end of Taylor Glacier to New Harbour in McMurdo Sound. It separates the Kukri Hills to the south from the Asgard Range to the north.

== Features ==
Features of the valley include, from west to east, Bonney Riegel below Mount J. J. Thomson, Lake Bonney, Nussbaum Reigel, Mummy Pond, Lake Chad, Andrews Ridge, and Lake Frysell, which is fed by the Delta Stream from the south.

=== Bonney Riegel ===
77°43′S 162°22′E. A riegel, or rock bar extending north from the Kukri Hills across Taylor Valley to Lake Bonney. Named in association with Lake Bonney by the Western Journey Party, led by Griffith Taylor, of the BrAE, 1910–1913.

=== Mount J. J. Thomson ===
77°41′S 162°15′E. A prominent hump-shaped peak along the north wall of Taylor Valley, standing above Lake Bonney, between Rhone Glacier and Matterhorn Glacier. So named by the Western Journey Party, led by Taylor, of the BrAE, 1910–1913. The initials have been retained to distinguish the name from Mount Allan Thomson (also named by BrAE, 1910–1913) near Mackay Glacier.

=== Lake Bonney ===
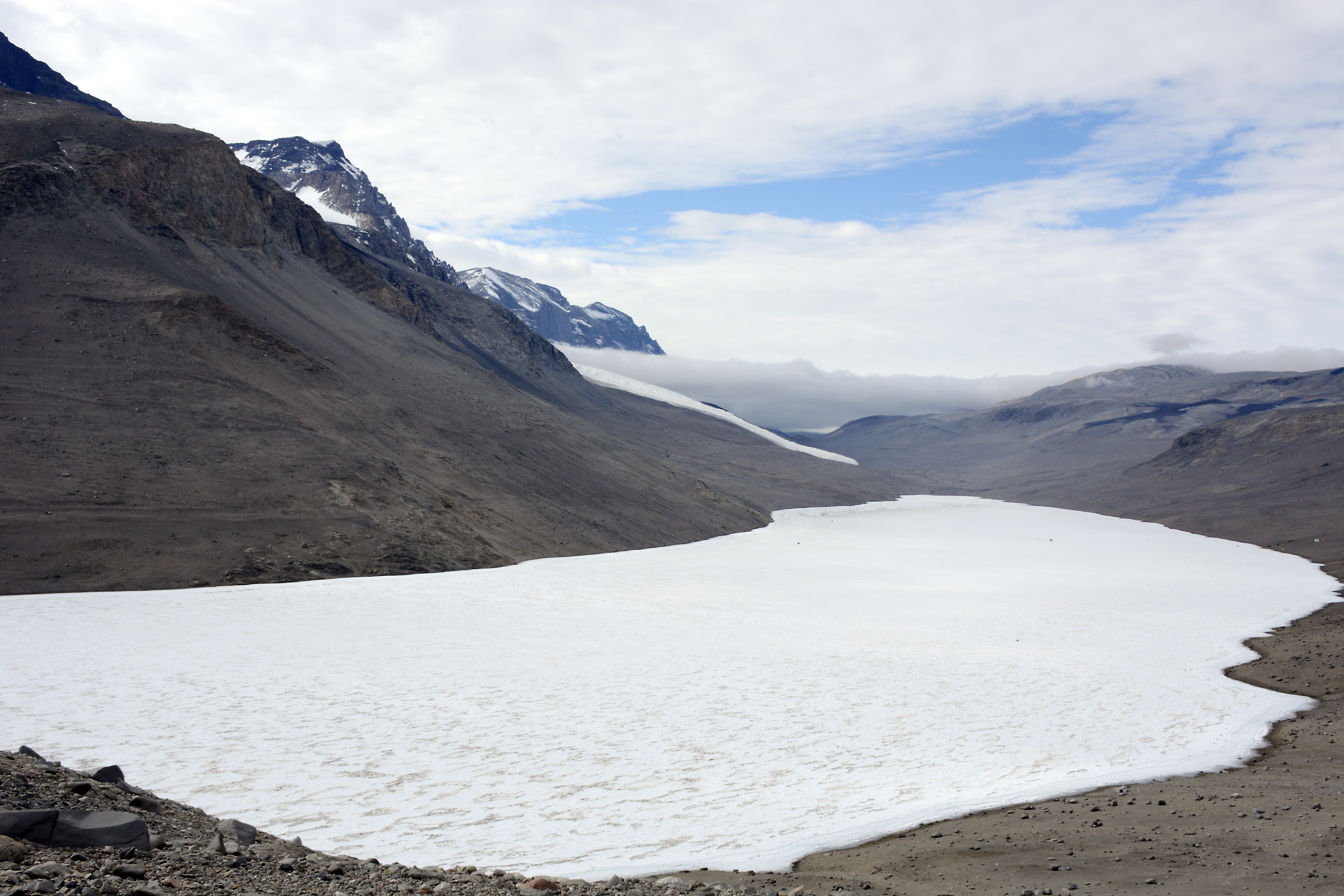
Lake Bonney 2015

77°43′S 162°25′E. Lake lying at the mouth of Taylor Glacier. Visited by the BrnAE, 1901–1904. Named by the BrAE under Scott, 1910–1913, for T. Bonney, professor of geology at Cambridge University, England.

=== Ventifact Knobs ===
77°42′S 162°35′E. Minor knobs, 3 to 6 metres (9.8 to 19.7 ft) high, composed of lake clay covered by glacial drift. The glacial drift has cobbles that are well polished by the wind and cut into ventifacts. The knobs are covered by ventifacts, suggesting the name, and are located just east of Lake Bonney. Named by United States geologist Troy L. Péwé, who was the first to study and describe the knobs in December 1957.

=== Nussbaum Riegel ===
77°40′S 162°46′E. A riegel or rock-bar across Taylor Valley, extending from the vicinity of Sollas Glacier toward Lake Chad. Charted and named by the BrAE under Scott, 1910–1913.

=== The Defile ===
77°39′S 162°43′E. Narrow ice-free passageway between the terminus of Suess Glacier and the talus-covered slope of Nussbaum Riegel in Taylor Valley. Charted and descriptively named by the BrAE under Scott, 1910–1913.

=== Andrews Ridge ===
77°39′S 162°50′E. A gentle ridge, the northern arm of Nussbaum Riegel, which trends eastward to the south of Suess Glacier and Lake Chad in Taylor Valley. Named by Griffith Taylor, leader of the Western Journey Party of the BrAE, 1910–1913.

=== Parera Pond ===
77.654241°S 162.917318°E. A pond lying 1 nautical mile (1.9 km; 1.2 mi) south of Andrews Ridge. Named by the New Zealand Geographic Board (NZGB) in 1998. Parera is the Maori word for wild duck.

=== Mummy Pond ===
77°40′S 162°39′E. A pond between the Suess and Lacroix Glaciers. So named by T.L. Péwé, a United States geologist who visited the area in December 1957, because of the mummified seals found around the pond.

=== Lake Chad ===
77°38′S 162°46′E. Small lake lying east of the mouth of Suess Glacier. Charted and named by the BrAE under Scott, 1910–1913, after the African lake of the same name.

=== Spaulding Pond ===
77°39′S 163°07′E. A pond 0.3 nautical miles (0.56 km; 0.35 mi) northeast of the terminal ice cliff of Howard Glacier. The name was suggested by Diane McKnight, leader of United States Geological Survey (USGS) field teams which studied the hydrology and geochemistry of streams and ponds in the Lake Fryxell basin, Taylor Valley, 1987–1994. Named after USGS hydrologist Sarah Ann Spauiding, a member of the team during two seasons, 1988–89 and 1991–92, who studied the pond.

=== Lake Hoare ===
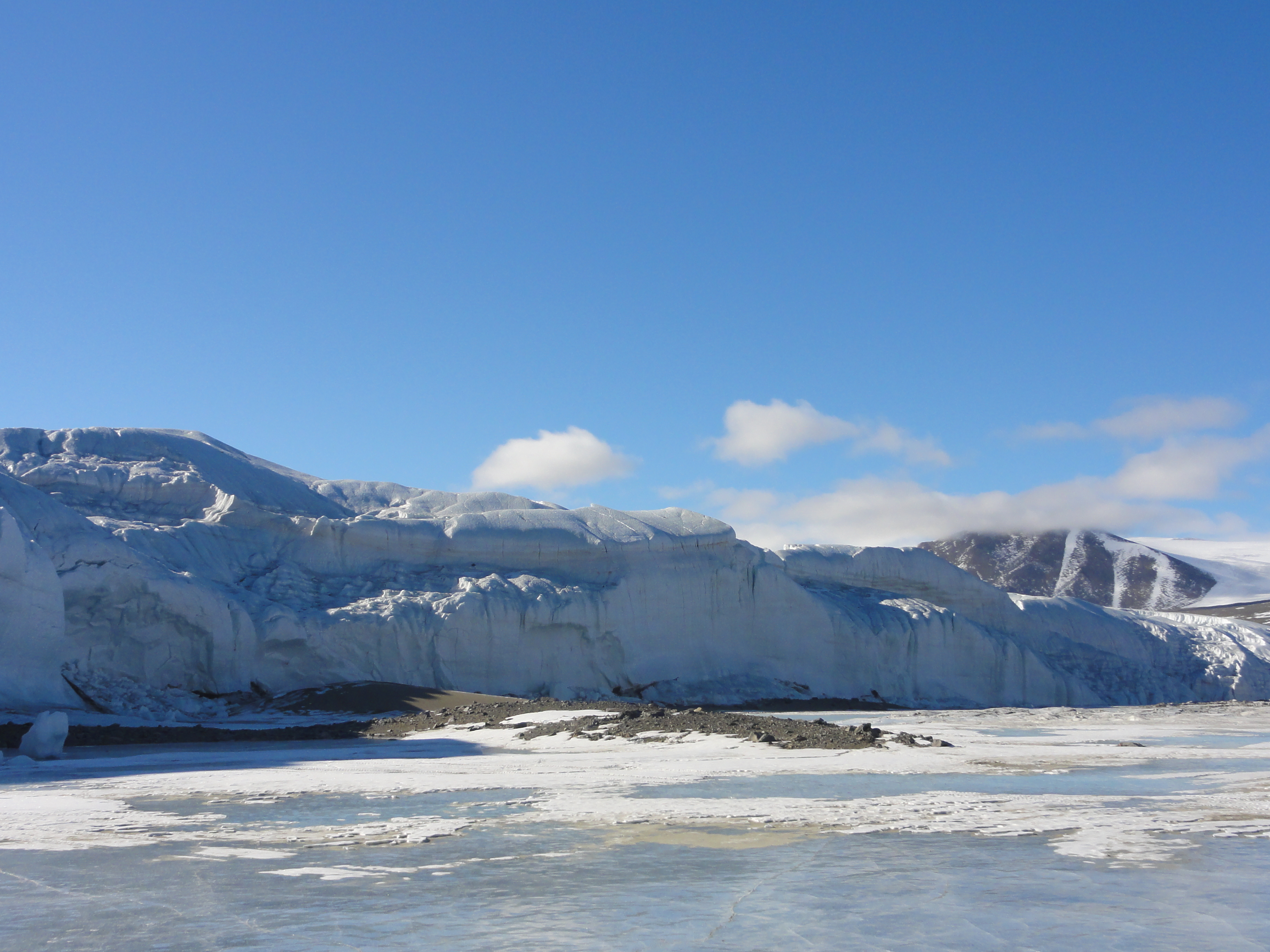
Lake Hoare 2014

77°38′S 162°51′E. A lake about 2 nautical miles (3.7 km; 2.3 mi) long between Lake Chad and Canada Glacier. Named by the 8th Victoria University of Wellington Antarctic Expedition (VUWAE), 1963–1964, for physicist R.A. Hoare, a member of VUWAE that examined lakes in Taylor, Wright, and Victoria Valleys.

=== Lake Fryxell ===
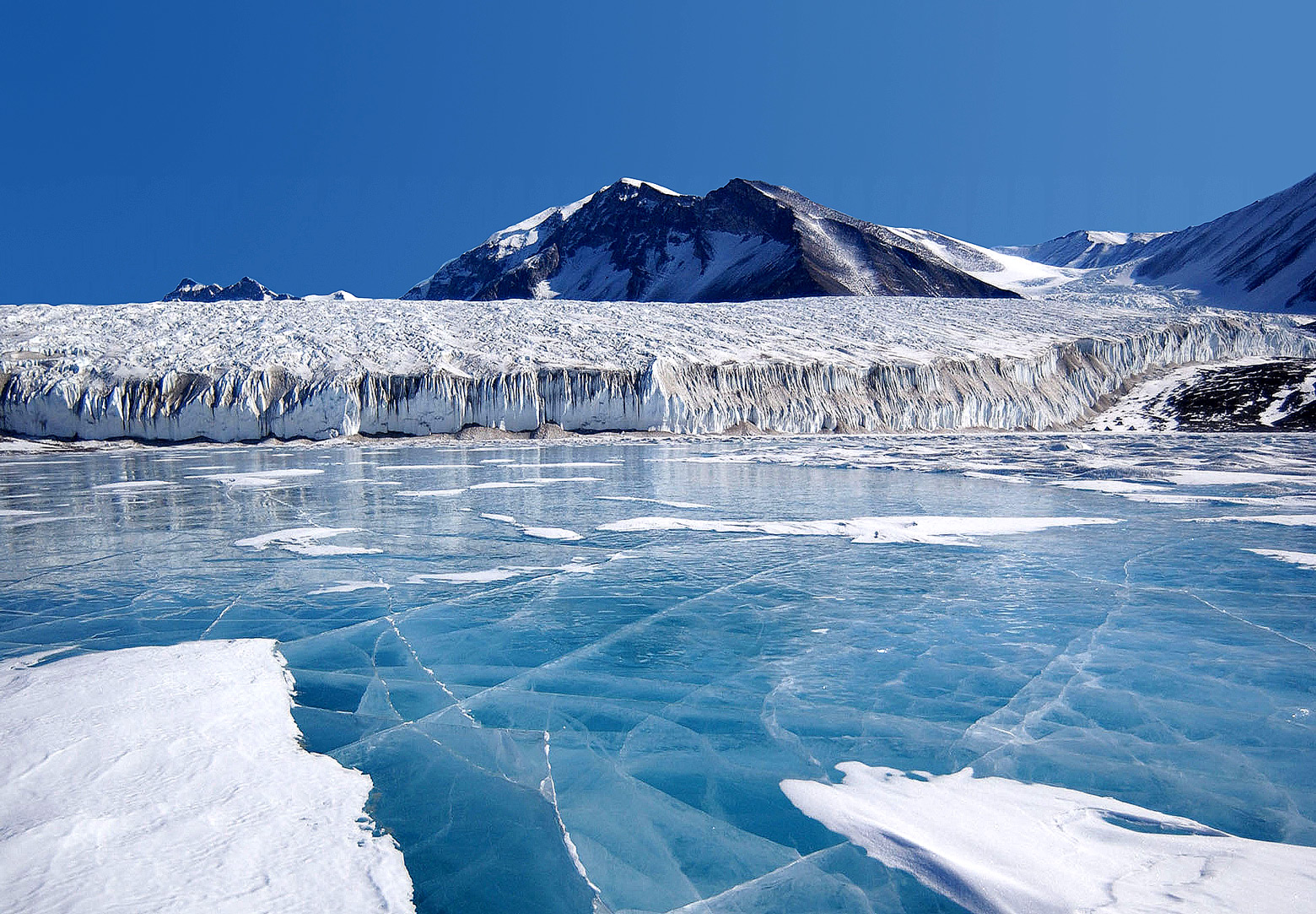
Lake Fryxell 2002

77°37′S 163°11′E. Lake 3 nautical miles (5.6 km; 3.5 mi) long, between Canada and Commonwealth Glaciers at the lower end of Taylor Valley. Mapped by the BrAE under Scott, 1910–1913. The lake was visited by Professor T.L. Péwé during the United States Navy Operation Deep Freeze, 1957–1958, and was named by him for Doctor Fritiof M. Fryxell, glacial geologist of Augustana College, Illinois.

=== Many Glaciers Pond ===
77°36′S 163°19′E. A pond, 0.3 nautical miles (0.56 km; 0.35 mi) long, located 0.5 nautical miles (0.93 km; 0.58 mi) south of the snout of Commonwealth Glacier in Taylor Valley. The pond is part of the Aiken Creek system and receives drainage from several glaciers, including Commonwealth Glacier, Wales Glacier, and the unnamed glacier next westward. The name was suggested by USGS hydrologist Diane McKnight, leader of USGS field teams that studied the hydrology of streams entering Lake Fryxell, Taylor Valley, 1987–1994.

=== Coral Ridge ===
77°35′S 163°25′E. A ridge trending north–south, transverse to the axis of Taylor Valley, forming a divide 100 metres (330 ft) above sea level between Lake Fryxell and Explorers Cove, McMurdo Sound. A large number of solitary fossil corals have been found here by NZARP/USARP teams in the course of joint geological studies of the area. The name was suggested by Donald P. Elston, USGS, a research team member who worked at the ridge in the 1979–80 and 1980–81 seasons.

== Northern glaciers and streams ==
Glaciers and streams descending towards the valley floor from the Asgard Range include Matterhorn Glacier, Lacroix Glacier, Suess Glacier, Canada Glacier, and Commonwealth Glacier.

=== Matterhorn Glacier ===
77°41′S 162°27′E. Small alpine glacier on the edge of the north wall of Taylor Valley, just west of the Matterhorn. Named after the Matterhorn by United States geologist T.L. Péwé, who visited the area in December 1957.

=== Lacroix Glacier ===
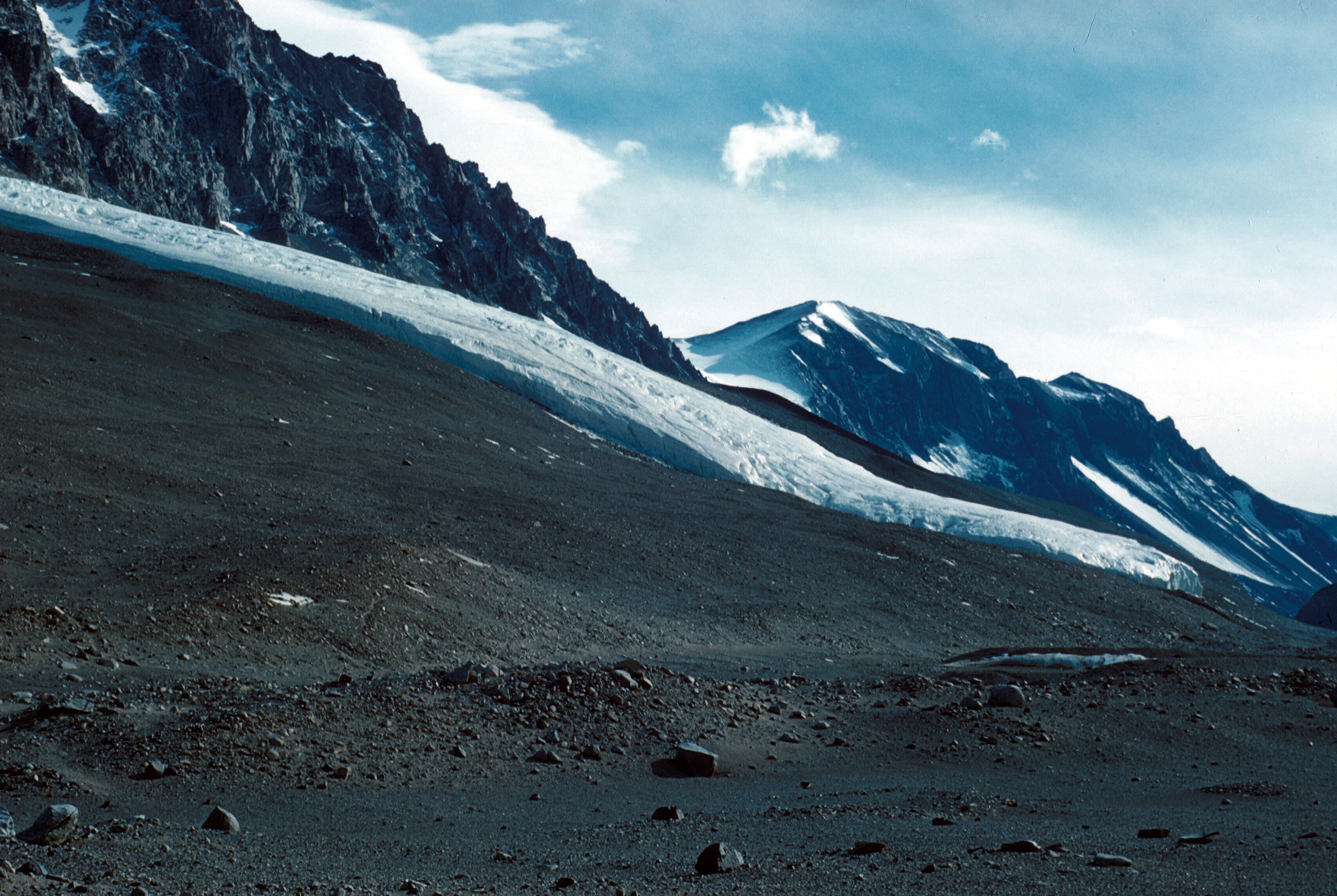
Lacroix Glacier in 1958

77°40′S 162°33′E. A glacier between Suess and Matterhorn Glaciers, which flows southeast into Taylor Valley. Mapped by the BrAE under Scott, 1910–1913, and named after Alfred Lacroix (see Mount Lacroix).

=== Suess Glacier ===
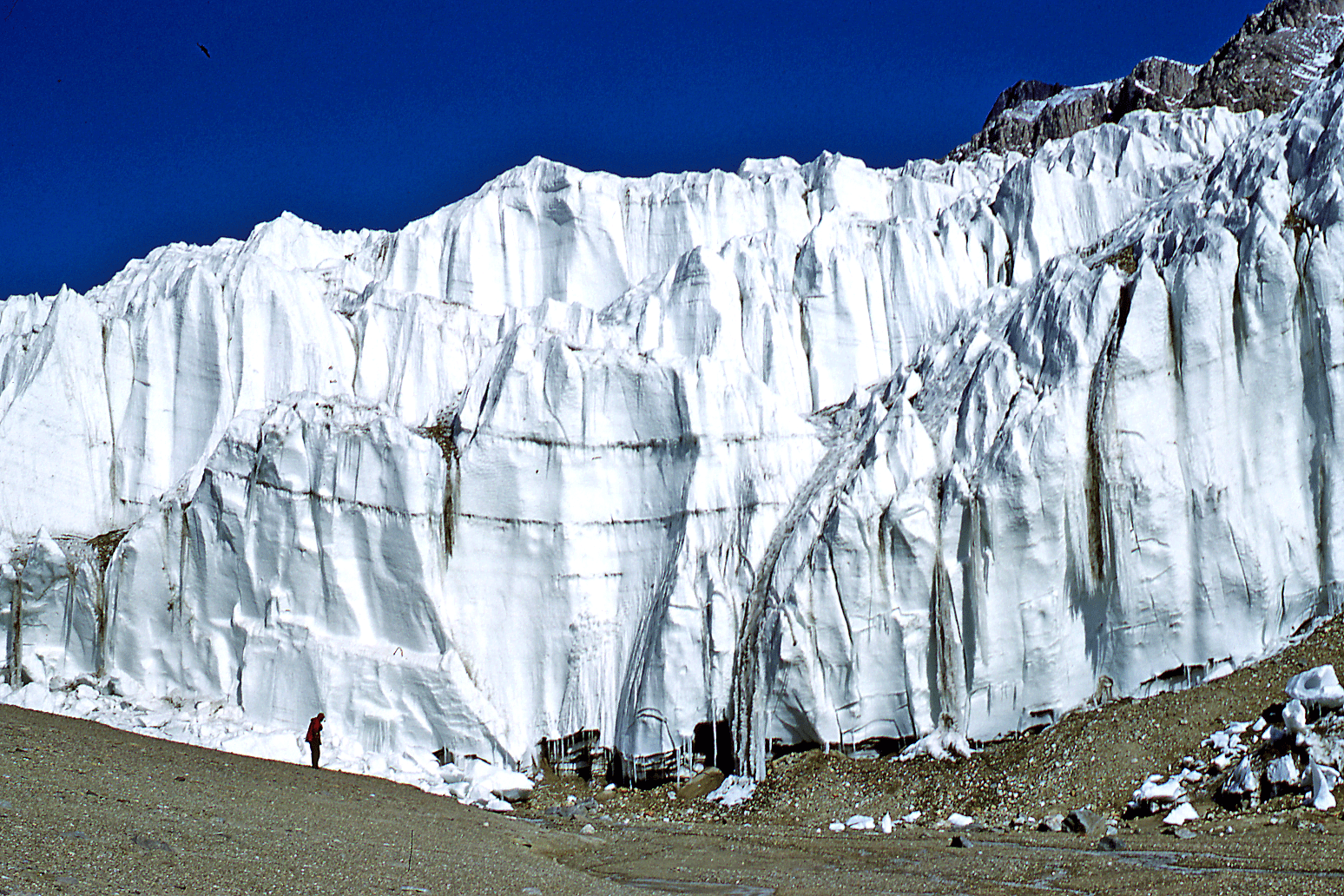
Suess Glacier in 1958–59

77°38′S 162°40′E. Glacier between Canada and Lacroix Glaciers, flowing south into Taylor Valley. Charted and named by the BrAE under Scott, 1910–1913, for Professor Eduard Suess, noted Austrian geologist and paleontologist.

=== Canada Glacier ===
77°37′S 162°59′E. Small glacier flowing southeast into the north side of Taylor Valley immediately west of Lake Fryxell. Charted and named by the BrAE, 1910–1913, under Scott. Charles S. Wright, a Canadian physicist, was a member of the party that explored this area.

=== Green Creek ===
77°37′S 163°04′E. A glacial meltwater stream, 0.65 nautical miles (1.20 km; 0.75 mi) long, flowing northeast from the extremity of Canada Glacier into the southwest end of Lake Fryxell, close east of Bowles Creek, in Taylor Valley. The name was suggested by hydrologist Diane McKnight, leader of USGS teams that made intensive studies of the hydrology of streams of the Lake Fryxell basin, 1987–1994. Named after William J. Green of Miami University, Oxford, Ohio, who conducted research on the geochemistry of the Onyx River, 1980–1981, and Lake Fryxell, Lake Hoare, and their feeder streams, 1982–1983.

=== Canada Stream ===
77°37′S 163°03′E. A small meltwater stream flowing east-southeast from the front of Canada Glacier into Lake Fryxell, in Taylor Valley. Named in association with Canada Glacier by the New Zealand Antarctic Place-Names Committee (NZ-APC) in 1983.

=== Andrews Creek ===
77°37′S 163°03′E. A glacial meltwater stream which flows south along the east margin of Canada Glacier into the west end of Lake Fryxell. The name was suggested by hydrologist Diane McKnight, leader of a USGS team which made extensive studies of the hydrology and geochemistry of streams and ponds in the Lake Fryxell basin, 1987–1994. Named after USGS hydrologist Edmund Andrews, a member of the field team who studied glacier hydrology during the 1987–88 and 1991–92 summer seasons.

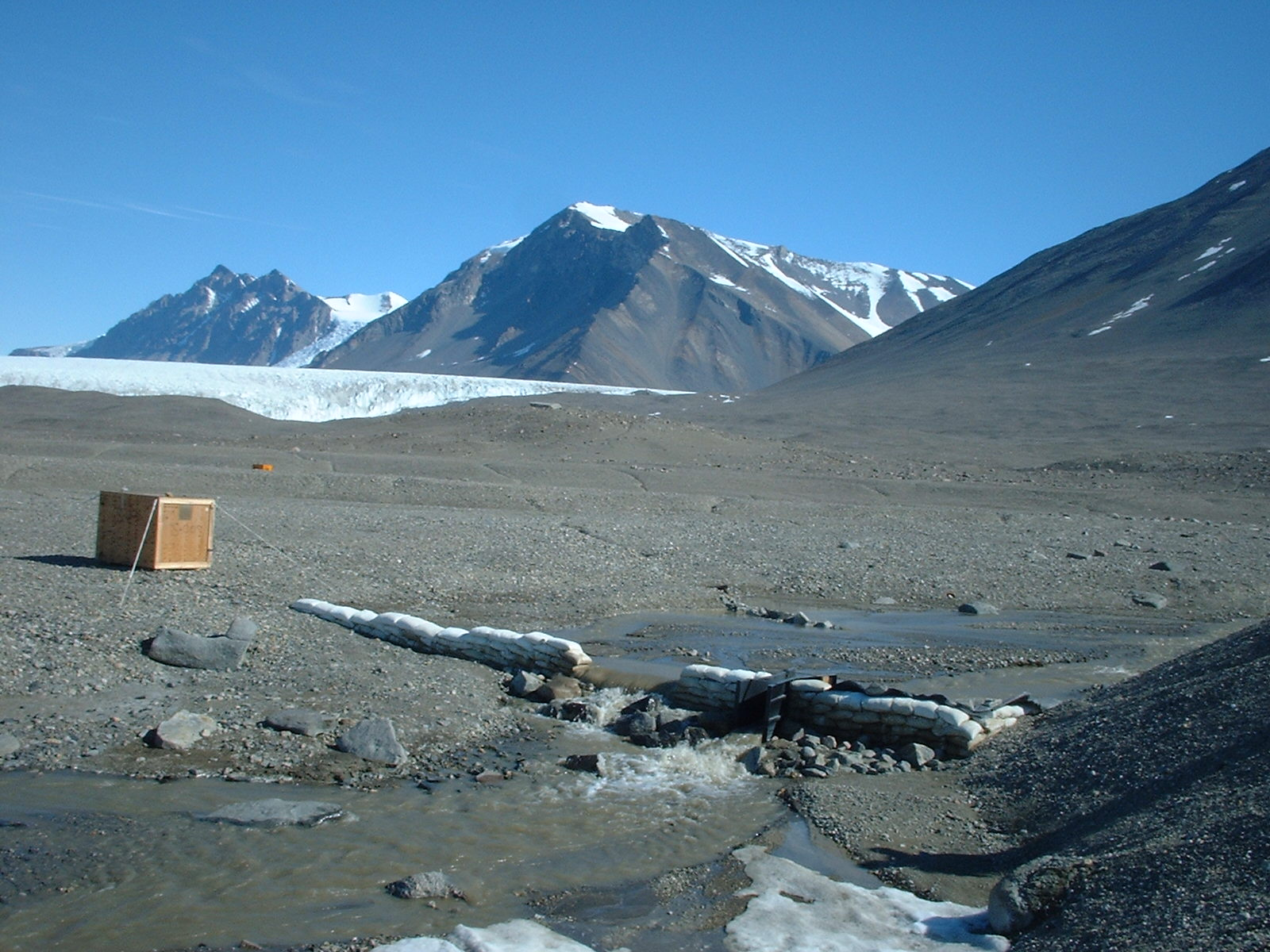
December 12, 2001 photo of the USGS streamflow-gaging station at Huey Creek

=== Huey Creek ===
77°36′S 163°06′E. A glacial meltwater stream, 1.2 nautical miles (2.2 km; 1.4 mi) long, flowing south from an ice field west of Mount Falconer to the north-central shore of Lake Fryxell. The name was suggested by hydrologist Diane McKnight, leader of a USGS team that made extensive hydrological studies in the Lake Fryxell basin, 1987–1994. The name acknowledges support received by the USGS field team in Taylor Valley from United States Navy Squadron VXE-6 and its twin engine UH-1N "Huey" helicopters.

=== Commonwealth Glacier ===
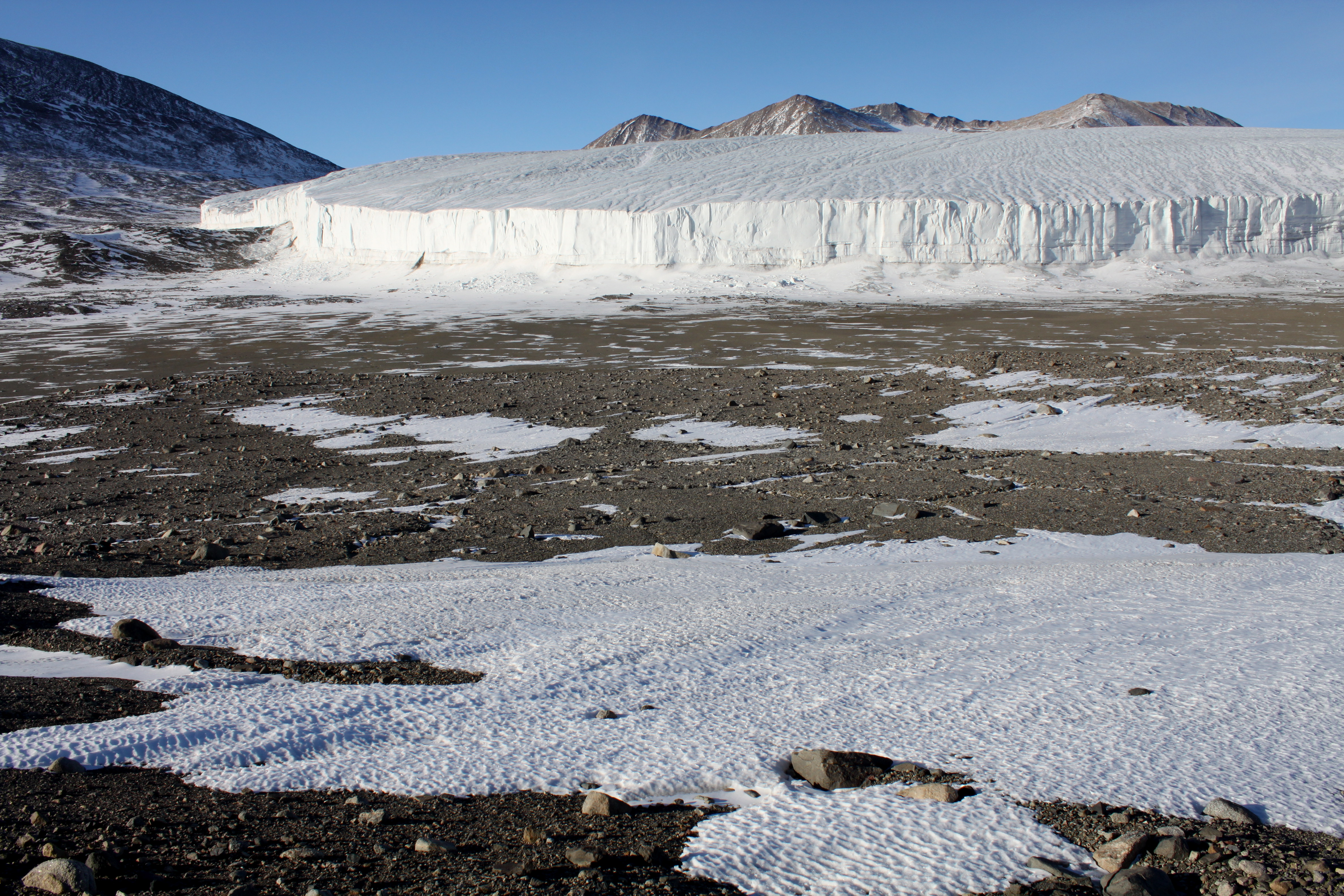
Commonwealth Glacier in 2009

77°35′S 163°19′E. Glacier which flows in a southeast direction and enters the north side of Taylor Valley immediately west of Mount Coleman. Charted and named by the BrAE under Scott, 1910–1913. Named for the Commonwealth of Australia, which made a financial grant to the BrAE and contributed two members to the Western Geological Party which explored this area.

=== McKnight Creek ===
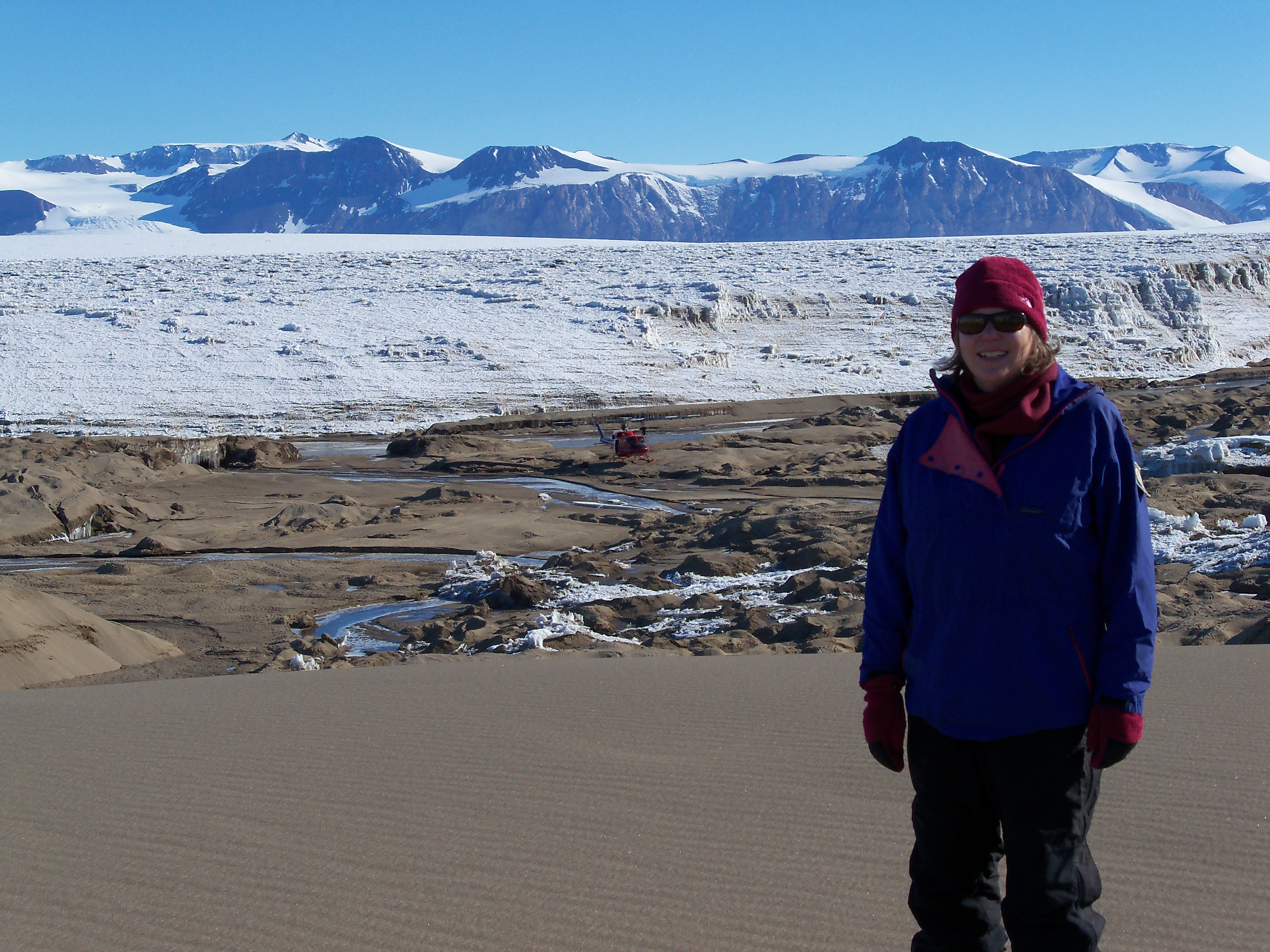
Diane McKnight, Cotton Glacier, McMurdo Dry Valleys

77°36′S 163°16′E. A glacial meltwater stream, 1 nautical mile (1.9 km; 1.2 mi) long, flowing southwest from the snout of Commonwealth Glacier and entering the east end of Lake Fryxell between Lost Seal Stream and Aiken Creek. Named by the US-ACAN after Diane McKnight, research hydrologist, USGS, leader of USGS field teams over several years (1987–1994) that made extensive studies of the hydrology and geochemistry of streams flowing into Lake Fryxell.

=== Lost Seal Stream ===
77°36′S 163°14′E. A glacial meltwater stream, 1.4 nautical miles (2.6 km; 1.6 mi) long, draining from the west margin of Commonwealth Glacier into the northeast end of Lake Fryxell. The name was suggested by Diane McKnight, leader of a USGS team that studied the hydrology of streams flowing into Lake Fryxell in several seasons, 1987–1994. The name commemorates the encounter with a living Weddell seal. The seal wandered into the area north of Lake Fryxell during November 1990 and was evacuated by helicopter to New Harbor after it entered the camp area. A mummified seal is prominent at the mouth of the stream.

=== Commonwealth Stream ===
77°35′S 163°30′E. A meltwater stream in Taylor Valley which flows east from Commonwealth Glacier into New Harbor of McMurdo Sound. Studied on the ground during United States Navy Operation Depp Freeze, 1957–1958, by Troy L. Péwé who suggested the name in association with Commonwealth Glacier.

== Southern glaciers and streams ==
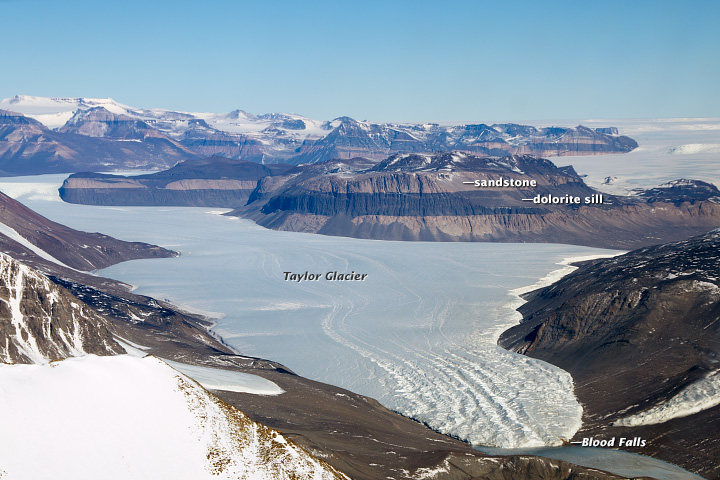
Taylor Valley, Taylor Glacier and Blood Falls, 2013

Glaciers descending towards the valley floor from the Kukri Hills include, from west to east, Glaciers in the Kukri Hills that flow towards the Taylor Valley floor include, from west to east, Calkin Glacier, Hughes Glacier, Sollas Glacier, Marr Glacier, Moa Glacier, Goldman Glacier, Howard Glacier, Crescent Glacier, Von Guerard Glacier. Aiken Glacier and Wales Glacier. Meltwater streams include:

=== Furlong Creek ===
77°39′S 163°07′E. A glacial meltwater tributary stream, 1.6 nautical miles (3.0 km; 1.8 mi) long, flowing north from Howard Glacier into Delta Stream. Spaulding Pond lies along this watercourse. The name was suggested by Diane McKnight, leader of a USGS team which made extensive studies of the hydrology and geochemistry of streams and ponds in the Lake Fryxell basin, 1987–1994. Named after hydrologist Edward Furlong, a member of the field team that established stream gaging stations on streams flowing into Lake Fryxell in the 1990–91 season.

=== Delta Stream ===
77°38′S 163°07′E. Small meltwater stream flowing from Howard Glacier into Lake Fryxell. First studied on the ground by Troy L. Péwé during United States Navy OpDFrz, 1957–1958, and so named by him because the stream has a series of deltas along its length which have been cut through as the stream was rejuvenated, the rejuvenation being caused by the lowering of the former glacial lake.

=== Crescent Stream ===
77°37′S 163°11′E. A glacial meltwater stream, 2.6 nautical miles (4.8 km; 3.0 mi) long, flowing north from Crescent Glacier to the south-central shore of Lake Fryxell. Named in association with Crescent Glacier. The name was suggested by USGS hydrologist Diane McKnight and was approved by the US-ACAN and the NZGB in 1994.

=== Harnish Creek ===
77°37′S 163°13′E. A meltwater stream, 3 nautical miles (5.6 km; 3.5 mi) long, which flows north from the unnamed glacier east of Crescent Glacier into the east part of Lake Fryxell. The name was suggested by hydrologist Diane McKnight, leader of a USGS team that made extensive studies of the hydrology and geochemistry of streams and ponds in the Lake Fryxell basin, 1987–1994. Named after USGS hydrologist Richard A. Harnish, a member of the field team in the 1988–89 and 1990–91 seasons; during latter season assisted in establishing stream gaging stations on streams flowing into Lake Fryxell.

=== Von Guerard Stream ===
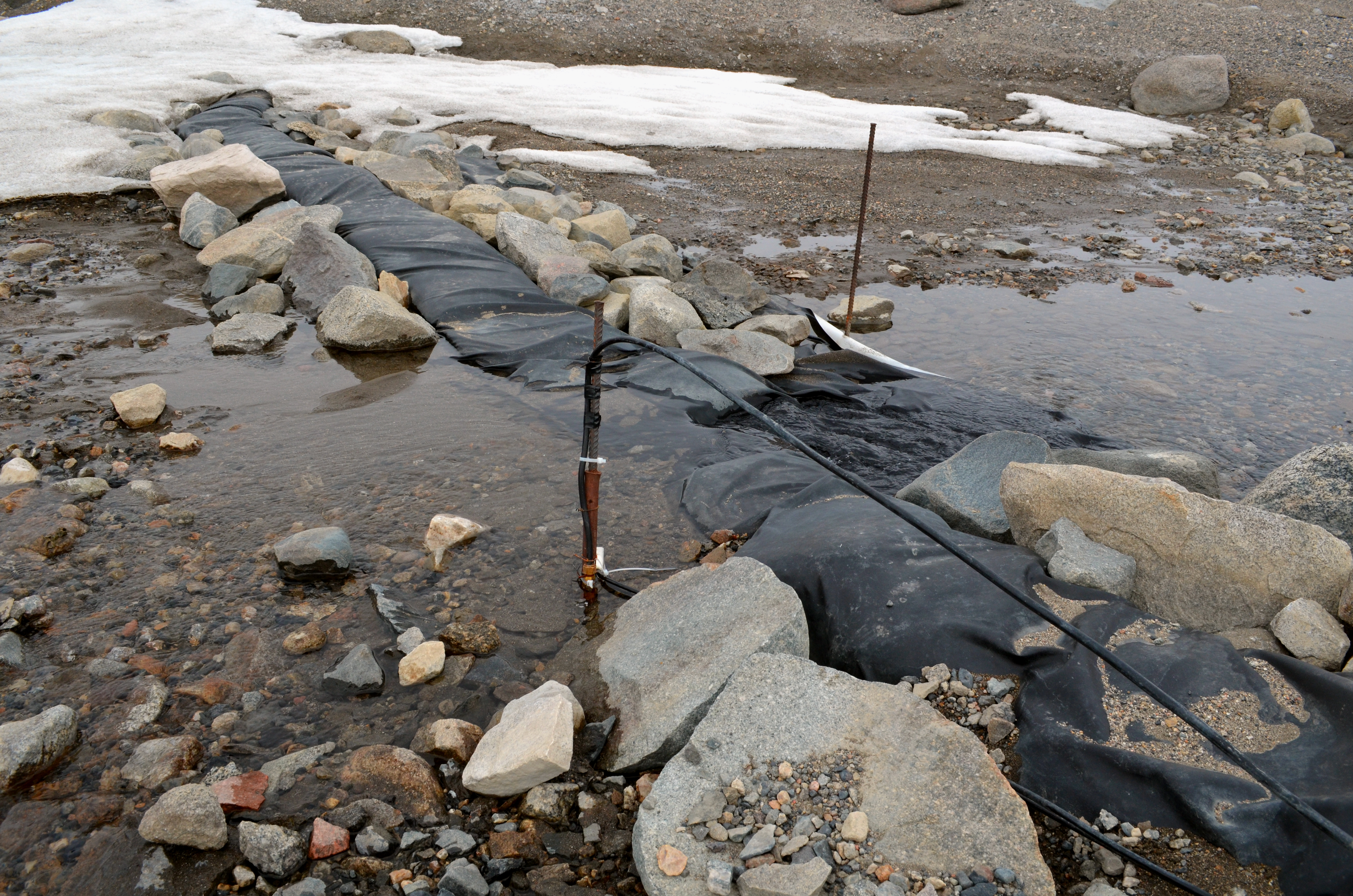
Von Guerard Stream gauge (2013)

77°37′S 163°15′E. A glacial meltwater stream, 2.5 nautical miles (4.6 km; 2.9 mi) long, which flows northwest from the unnamed glacier east of Crescent Glacier to enter Lake Fryxell close east of Harnish Creek. The name was suggested by Diane McKnight, leader of USGS teams which made extensive studies of the hydrology of streams in the Lake Fryxell basin, 1987–1994. Named after hydrologist Paul B. von Guerard, a member of the field team in three seasons, 1990–1994, who assisted in establishing stream gaging stations on streams flowing into Lake Fryxell in the 1990–91 season.

=== Maria Creek ===
77°37′S 163°03′E. A glacial meltwater stream, 0.5 nautical miles (0.93 km; 0.58 mi) long, which flows from the snout of Canada Glacier. It drains NE, close to the glacier, entering the west end of Lake Fryxell to the west of Bowles Creek and Green Creek. The name was suggested by Diane McKnight, USGS hydrologist working in the Lake Fryxell basin, 1987–1994, and alludes to the many aeolian deposits of fine sands along the creek, indicative of strong winds blowing around the south end of Canada Glacier during the winter. Named from "They Called the Wind Maria," a song in Paint Your Wagon, the American musical play by Lerner and Loewe.

=== Bowles Creek ===
77°37′S 163°03′E. A glacial meltwater distributary stream, 0.25 nautical miles (0.46 km; 0.29 mi) long, which flows east from Maria Creek (q.v.) into the southwest end of Lake Fryxell, close west of Green Creek. The name was suggested by hydrologist Diane McKnight, leader of a USGS team which made extensive studies of the hydrology and geochemistry of streams and ponds in the Lake Fryxell basin, 1987–1994. Named after USGS hydrologist Elizabeth C. Bowles, a member of the field team in the 1987–88 summer season, who conducted a study of organic geochemistry of streams flowing into Lake Fryxell.

=== Aiken Creek ===
77°36′S 163°17′E. A glacial meltwater stream in Taylor Valley, which flows north from the unnamed glacier west of Wales Glacier to Many Glaciers Pond, then west to Lake Fryxell. The feature is 4 nautical miles (7.4 km; 4.6 mi) long and receives some tributary flow from Wales Glacier. The name was suggested by hydrologist Diane McKnight, leader of the USGS team which made extensive studies of the hydrology and geochemistry of streams and ponds in the Lake Fryxell basin, 1987–1994. Named after USGS hydrologist George R. Aiken, a member of the field team in three summer seasons, 1987–1991, who assisted in establishing stream gaging stations on the streams flowing into Lake Fryxell in the 1990–91 season.

== See also ==
- McMurdo Dry Valleys geology
- Victoria Valley (far north)
- Lake Washburn (Antarctica)
- Wright Valley (north)

== Sources ==
- Alberts, Fred G., ed. (1995), Geographic Names of the Antarctic (PDF) (2 ed.), United States Board on Geographic Names This article incorporates public domain material from websites or documents of the United States Board on Geographic Names.
- "Parera Pond", Geographic Names Information System, United States Geological Survey, United States Department of the Interior
- "Quinn Gully", Geographic Names Information System, United States Geological Survey, United States Department of the Interior
- Ross Island, USGS: United States Geological Survey

This article incorporates public domain material from websites or documents of the United States Geological Survey.
