= Williamson Glacier Tongue =

Glacier tongue in Antarctica

Coordinates: 66°29′S 114°24′E

Williamson Glacier Tongue is the prominent seaward extension of the Williamson Glacier into Colvocoresses Bay. Delineated from air photos taken by U.S. Navy Operation Highjump (1946–47). Named by Advisory Committee on Antarctic Names (US-ACAN) in association with Williamson Glacier.
