= Whittle Glacier =

Glacier in Antarctica

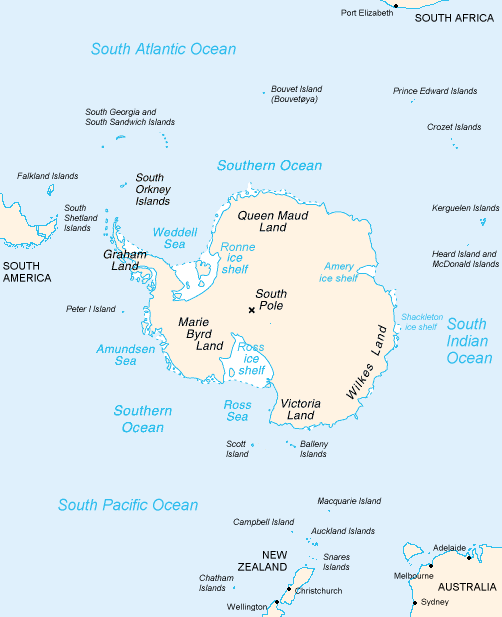
- Map of Antarctica, with Wilkes Land slightly to the right

- Location within Antarctica
- Type: short channel
- Location: Wilkes Land
- Coordinates: 66°22′00″S 114°13′00″E
- Thickness: unknown
- Terminus: Whittle Glacier Tongue
- Status: unknown

Whittle Glacier (66°22′S 114°13′E) is a short channel glacier flowing northeast to Colvocoresses Bay and terminating in a small glacier tongue 6 nautical miles (11 km; 6.9 mi) northwest of Williamson Glacier. Delineated from air photos taken by U.S. Navy Operation Highjump (1946–47), and named by Advisory Committee on Antarctic Names (US-ACAN) for Dr. J.S. Whittle, Assistant Surgeon on the sloop Vincennes of the United States Exploring Expedition (1838–42) under Lieutenant Charles Wilkes.

Whittle Glacier Tongue (66°20′S 114°24′E) is a small glacier tongue extending seaward from Whittle Glacier into Colvocoresses Bay. Delineated from aerial photographs taken by U.S. Navy Operation Highjump (1946–47), and named by Advisory Committee on Antarctic Names (US-ACAN) in association with Whittle Glacier.

== See also ==
- List of glaciers in the Antarctic
- Glaciology
