= Folk Ridge =

Folk Ridge (73°9′S 161°49′E) is a ridge just southeast of Moore Ridge and parallel to it in the Caudal Hills of Victoria Land, Antarctica. The ridge was first mapped by the United States Geological Survey from surveys and U.S. Navy air photos, 1960–64, and was named by the Advisory Committee on Antarctic Names for John E. Folk, a biolab technician at McMurdo Station, Hut Point Peninsula, Ross Island, 1965–66. The feature lies situated on the Pennell Coast, a portion of Antarctica lying between Cape Williams and Cape Adare.
