= Elliott Glacier =

Glacier in Wilkes Land, Antarctica

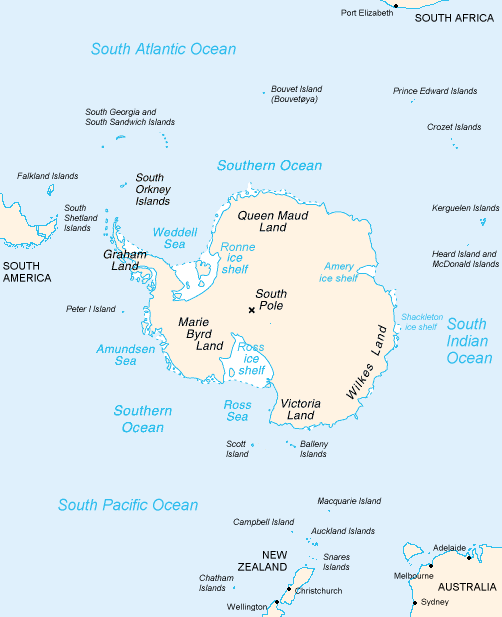
- Map of Antarctica, with Wilkes Land slightly to the right

- Location within Antarctica
- Type: channel
- Location: Wilkes Land
- Coordinates: 66°33′00″S 115°14′00″E
- Thickness: unknown
- Terminus: Budd Coast
- Status: unknown

Elliott Glacier (66°33′S 115°14′E) is a small channel glacier that drains northward to the Budd Coast of Antarctica, midway between Cape Hammersly and Cape Waldron. It was delineated from aerial photographs taken by U.S. Navy Operation Highjump (1946–47), and named by the Advisory Committee on Antarctic Names after Samuel Elliott, a midshipman on the sloop Vincennes during the United States Exploring Expedition (1838–42) under Lieutenant Charles Wilkes.

== See also ==
- List of glaciers in the Antarctic
- Glaciology
