= Cape Hammersly =

Cape on Budd Coast, Antarctica

Cape Hammersly (66°28′S 115°3′E) is an ice-covered cape midway between Williamson Glacier and Totten Glacier on Budd Coast, Antarctica. It was delineated by Gardner Dean Blodgett (1955) from aerial photographs taken by U.S. Navy Operation Highjump (1946–47), and named by the Advisory Committee on Antarctic Names for George W. Hammersly, a midshipman on the sloop Vincennes during the United States Exploring Expedition (1833–1842) under Lieutenant Charles Wilkes.
