= Cleft Ledge =

Cleft Ledge (77°32′S 160°53′E) is a flat-topped ridge 1 nautical mile (2 km) long and 0.3 nautical miles (0.6 km) wide between Shaw Trough and Healy Trough in the Labyrinth of Wright Valley, McMurdo Dry Valleys. The ledge rises to 920 metres (3,020 ft) and is 0.3 nautical miles northwest of Hoffman Ledge. The name is descriptive and was recommended by the Advisory Committee on Antarctic Names (2004) because a central north-south hanging valley nearly divides the ledge in half.
