= Oliver Island =

Oliver Island may refer to:

- Oliver Island (Antarctica)
- Oliver Island (Western Australia)
