= Brien Rocks =

The Brien Rocks (73°13′S 161°23′E) are a group of prominent rock outcrops lying 6 nautical miles (11 km) west of the Caudal Hills, in Victoria Land, Antarctica. They were mapped by the United States Geological Survey from surveys and from U.S. Navy air photos, 1960–64, and were named by the Advisory Committee on Antarctic Names for Robert J. Brien, an aviation electronics technician with U.S. Navy Squadron VX-6 at McMurdo Station, Hut Point Peninsula, Ross Island, 1966. These rock formations lie situated on the Pennell Coast, a portion of Antarctica lying between Cape Williams and Cape Adare.
