= Cape Polar Sea =

Cape at the South Pole

Cape Polar Sea (73°32′S 169°27′E) is a rock cape that forms the west extremity of Coulman Island in northwest Ross Sea. Named in 1998 by Advisory Committee on Antarctic Names (US-ACAN) after USCGC Polar Sea, an icebreaker in support of United States Antarctic Program (USAP) activities in the Ross, Amundsen and Bellingshausen Seas, and other Antarctic coastal areas during 11 seasons, 1980–1997. The cape lies in proximity to Cape Polar Star and Glacier Strait, two features named earlier for American icebreakers.
