= Pinet Butte =

Mountain in Antarctica

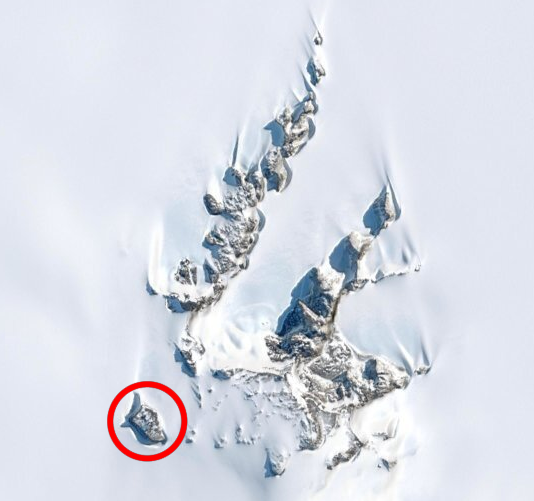
- Pinet Butte and the Caudal Hills, Pinet Butte circled in red.

Geography

Pinet Butte.png Pinet Butte (73°10′S 161°41′E) is a small butte comprising the westernmost portion of the Caudal Hills, in Victoria Land. Mapped by United States Geological Survey (USGS) from surveys and U.S. Navy air photos, 1960–64. Named by Advisory Committee on Antarctic Names (US-ACAN) for Paul R. Pinet, geologist at McMurdo Station, 1966–67.
