= Waring Bluff =

Waring Bluff (73°1′S 161°5′E) is a rock bluff in the north part of the Sequence Hills, Victoria Land. Mapped by United States Geological Survey (USGS) from surveys and U.S. Navy air photos, 1960–64. Named by Advisory Committee on Antarctic Names (US-ACAN) for James T. Waring, U.S. Navy, an air controlman at McMurdo Station in 1967.
