= Lasher =

Lasher may refer to:

- Lasher (novel), the second novel in the Anne Rice series Lives of the Mayfair Witches.
- Lasher (comics), a supervillain in the Marvel Universe
- Lasher Creek, near Randall, New York
- Lasher Spur, Antarctica
- Lasher-Davis House, a historic home in Nelliston, Montgomery County, New York
- Father-Lasher (Myoxocephalus scorpius), a fish

== People with the surname ==
- Count Lasher (1921–1977), Jamaican singer and songwriter
- Fred Lasher (born 1941), American baseball player
- Howard L. Lasher (1944–2007), American politician
- John Lasher (1932 –2015), New Zealand rugby league footballer
- Micah Lasher (born 1981), American politician
