= Paz Cove =

Body of water in Queen Mary Land, Antarctica

Paz Cove (66°14′S 100°47′E) is a cove, 1 nautical mile (1.9 km) wide and 4 nautical miles (7 km) long, indenting the north side of the Bunger Hills 2.5 nautical miles (4.6 km) southeast of Cape Henderson. Mapped from aerial photographs taken by U.S. Navy Operation Highjump, 1946–47, and named by the Advisory Committee on Antarctic Names (US-ACAN) for H.J. Paz, air crew on U.S. Navy Operation Highjump photographic flights in this area and other coastal areas between 14 and 164 East longitude.
