= Moore Ridge =

Geographic feature in Antarctica

Moore Ridge (73°7′S 161°45′E) is the northernmost ridge of the Caudal Hills in Victoria Land, Antarctica. It was mapped by the United States Geological Survey from surveys and U.S. Navy air photos, 1960–64, and was named by the Advisory Committee on Antarctic Names for Bruce F. Moore, a photographer with U.S. Navy Squadron VX-6 at McMurdo Station in 1966.
