= Anderson Scarp =

Anderson Scarp (77°33′S 161°21′E) is an upward slope and cliff 935 metres (3,070 ft) high, about 0.8 nautical miles (1.5 km) west of Hall Bluff on the Dais, Wright Valley, in the McMurdo Dry Valleys of Antarctica. It was named by the Advisory Committee on Antarctic Names in 2004 after Kent Anderson of the Albuquerque Seismological Laboratory, U.S. Geological Survey, from 1992. He played a key role in the installation of the VNDA seismograph station at Bull Pass, near Lake Vanda, in the early 1990s.
