= Crary Knoll =

Crary Knoll (78°16′S 161°37′E) is a symmetrical ice-covered knoll rising to 1,520 metres (5,000 ft), 2 nautical miles (4 km) south-southeast of Holmes Block in the Skelton Glacier area, Hillary Coast. It was named by the Advisory Committee on Antarctic Names in 1994. The toponym provides a historical footnote that U.S. scientist Albert P. Crary, for whom Crary Ice Rise is also named, led geophysical traverses past this feature to the Polar Plateau en route to the South Pole and other destinations.
