= Mount Wheat =

Mountain in Graham Land, Antarctica

Coordinates: 64°50′S 63°23′W

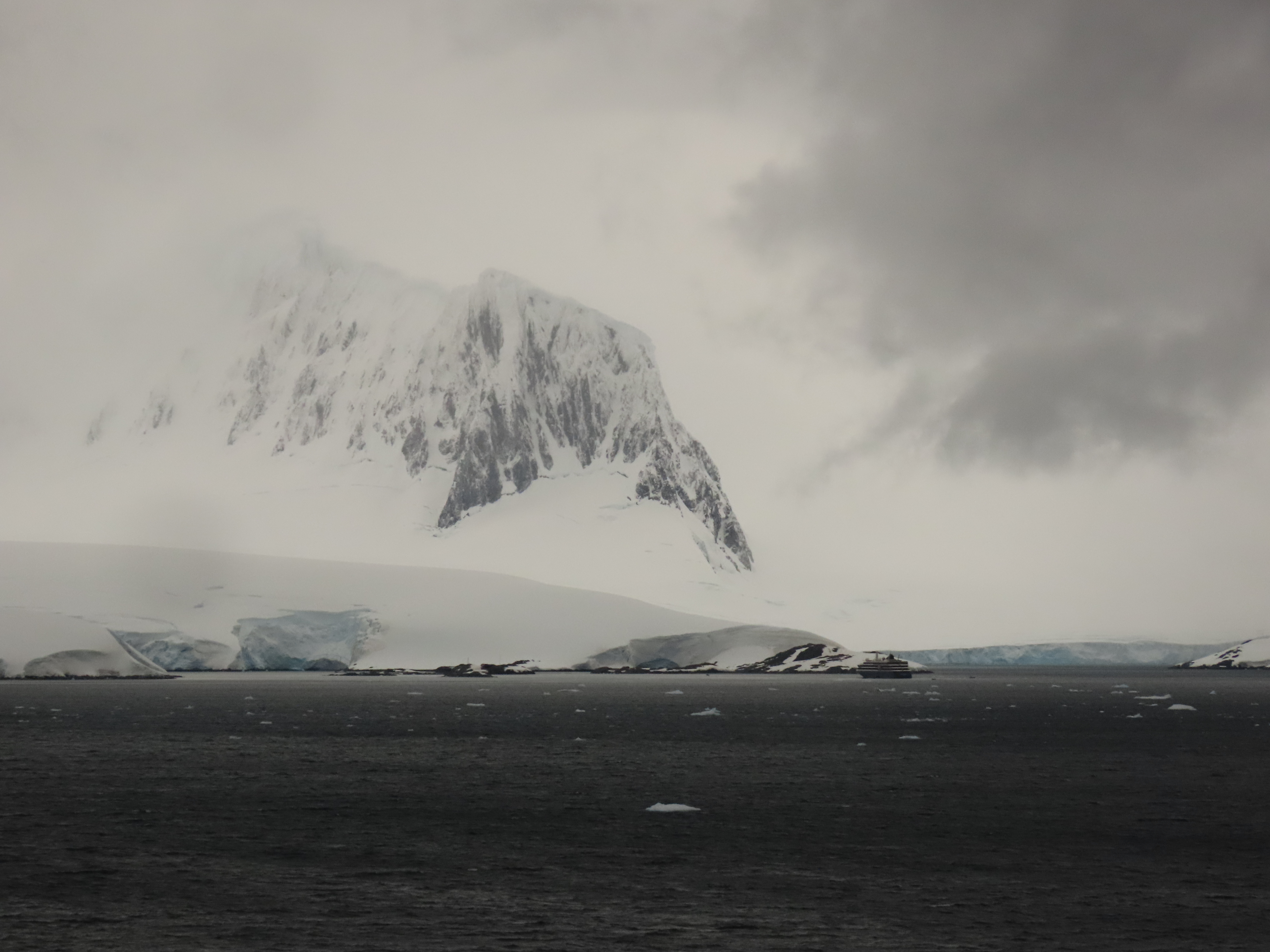
Mt Wheat from Holland America Cruise, 21 Jan 2023 [c.Laban West]

Mount Wheat is a prominent mountain (1,100 metres (3,600 ft)) forming the highest point in Wall Range, rising immediately north of Thunder Glacier in the center of Wiencke Island, Palmer Archipelago. Probably first observed by the Belgian Antarctic Expedition which circumnavigated Wiencke Island in 1898. Named by Advisory Committee on Antarctic Names (US-ACAN) after Lieutenant Commander Luther William Wheat, U.S. Navy, helicopter commander with Squadron VXE-6, Operation Deepfreeze, 1975–78; Aviation Projects Manager, Division of Polar Programs, National Science Foundation, 1978; member, U.S. Advisory Committee on Antarctic Names, 1979–88.
