= Péwé Peak =

Mountain in the Antarctic

- Location within Antarctica

Highest point
- Coordinates: 78°2′S 163°40′E

Geography
- Continent: Antarctica
- Region: Victoria Land

Péwé Peak (78°2′S 163°40′E) is a bedrock peak, 860 metres (2,820 ft) high, composed of granite and topped with a dolerite sill. The peak is immediately south of Joyce Glacier and is surrounded by glacial ice except on the south side. It was named by the Advisory Committee on Antarctic Names for Troy L. Péwé, a glacial geologist with U.S. Navy Operation Deep Freeze, 1957–58, who personally explored this peak as well as adjacent portions of Victoria Land.

== Nearby features ==
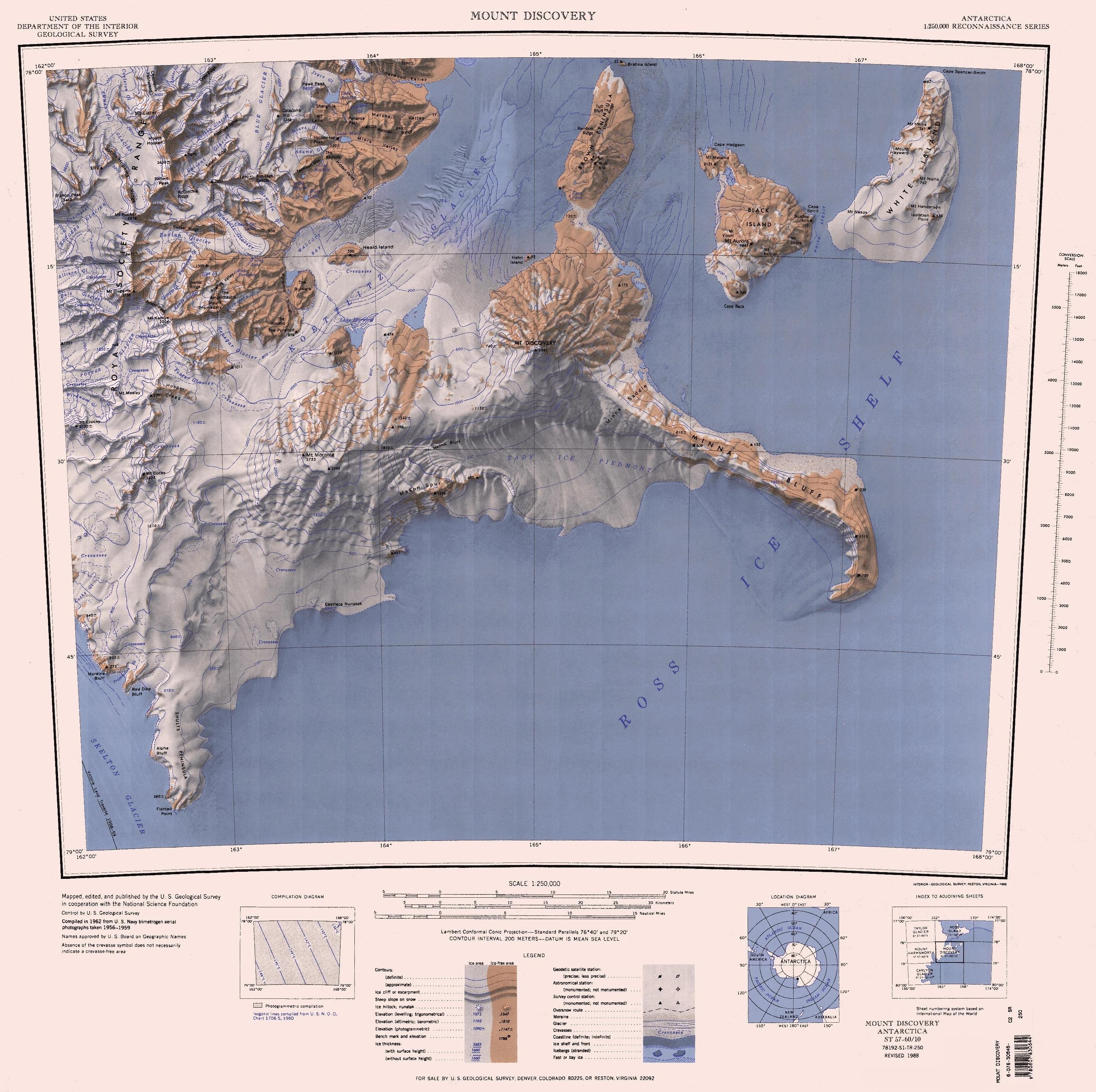
Péwé Peakl to the north of map

Péwé Peak is in the Denton Hills. Péwé Peak rises above Joyce Glacier to the north, and Lake Buddha to the west. Shangri-la is to the south and Catacomb Hill to the southwest.

=== Joyce Glacier ===
78°01′S 163°42′E. Glacier immediately north of Péwé Peak, draining from the névé northeast of Catacomb Hill and terminating 2 nautical miles (3.7 km; 2.3 mi) up-valley (west) of the snout of Garwood Glacier, which would have been a tributary to it in times of more intense glaciation. Named by the N.Z. Blue Glacier Party (1956-57) after Ernest Joyce, a member of British Antarctic expeditions of 1901-04, 1907-09 and 1914-17.

=== Zetland Glacier ===
78.009541°S 163.838367°E. A small hanging glacier on the southern slopes of Mount Alexandra. The glacier terminates on the cliffs north of Colleen Lake. The name, applied by New Zealand Geographic Board (NZGB) in 1994, is taken from an old spelling for the Shetland Islands of Scotland.

=== Colleen Lake ===
78°02′S 163°52′E. Small meltwater lake between the lower parts of Joyce Glacier and Garwood Glacier. It was first seen on the ground by U.S. geologist Troy L. Péwé on Jan. 14, 1958. He gave it the name Colleen because the feature is similar to many of the clear, reflecting lakes in Ireland.

=== Nostoc Flats ===
78.046746°S 163.685427°E. A small, flat glacial outwash plain, the surface of which is covered by the algae Nostoc. The feature is located east of the south lobe of Joyce Glacier. So named by the New Zealand Geographic Board (NZGB) in 1994.

=== Lake Buddha ===
78°03′S 163°45′E. A large proglacial lake on the south margin of Joyce Glacier in the small valley known as Shangri-la. Named in association with Shangri-la by the New Zealand Victoria University of Wellington Antarctic Expedition (VUWAE), 1960-61.

=== Mount Steep ===
78°3′S 163°51′E. A mountain rising to 978 metres (3,209 ft) at the east side of Lake Buddha. It was named by New Zealand Geographic Board (NZGB) in 1994; the name is suggested by the steep climb of the west side of the mountain.

=== Shangri-la ===
78°03′S 163°42′E. A small, secluded valley area completely isolated by mountain peaks, located immediately south of Joyce Glacier and Péwé Peak. The valley reminded personnel of the VUWAE (1960-61), who applied the name, of James Hilton's Shangri-la in Lost Horizon.

=== Kelmelis Hills ===
77°59′S 163°36′E. A group of hills rising to 1,070 metres (3,510 ft) high between Brodie Ponds and Joyce Glacier, situated midway up the Blue Glacier on its east margin. Named in 1992 by US-ACAN after John A. Kelmelis, cartographer, USGS; Manager of Polar Programs, Office of International Activities, USGS, 1984-87.

== Gallery ==
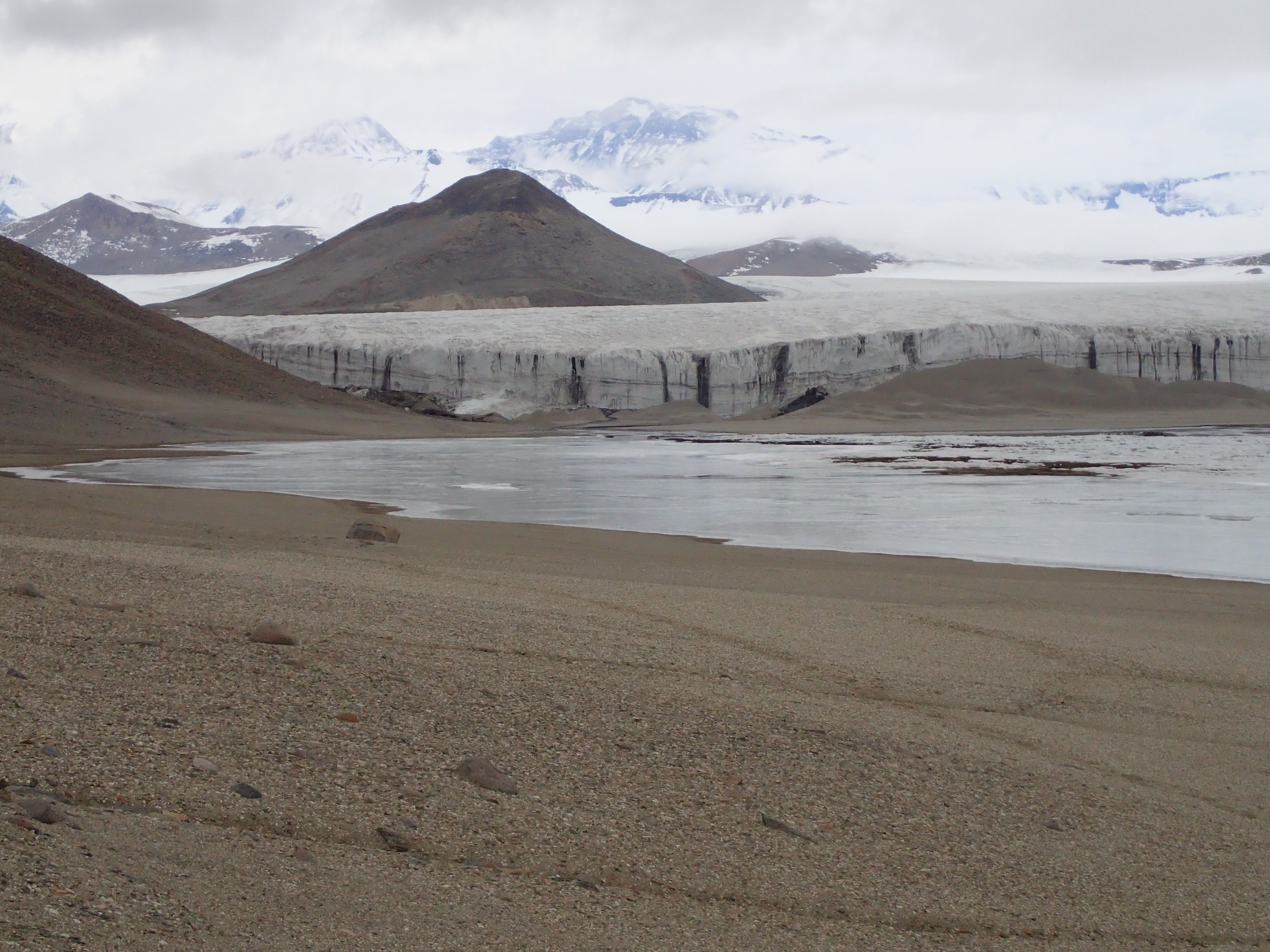
Colleen Lake

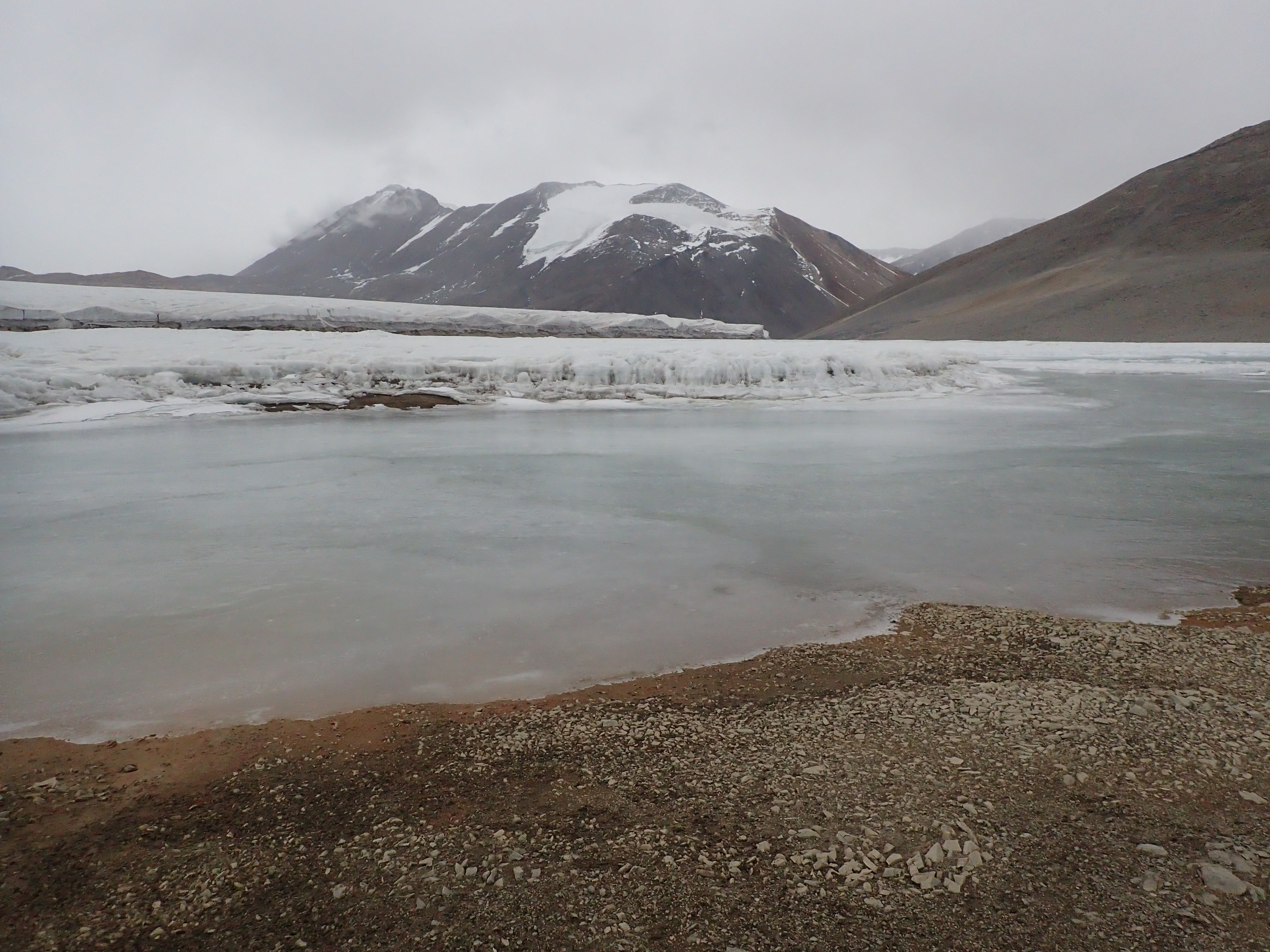
Shangri-la

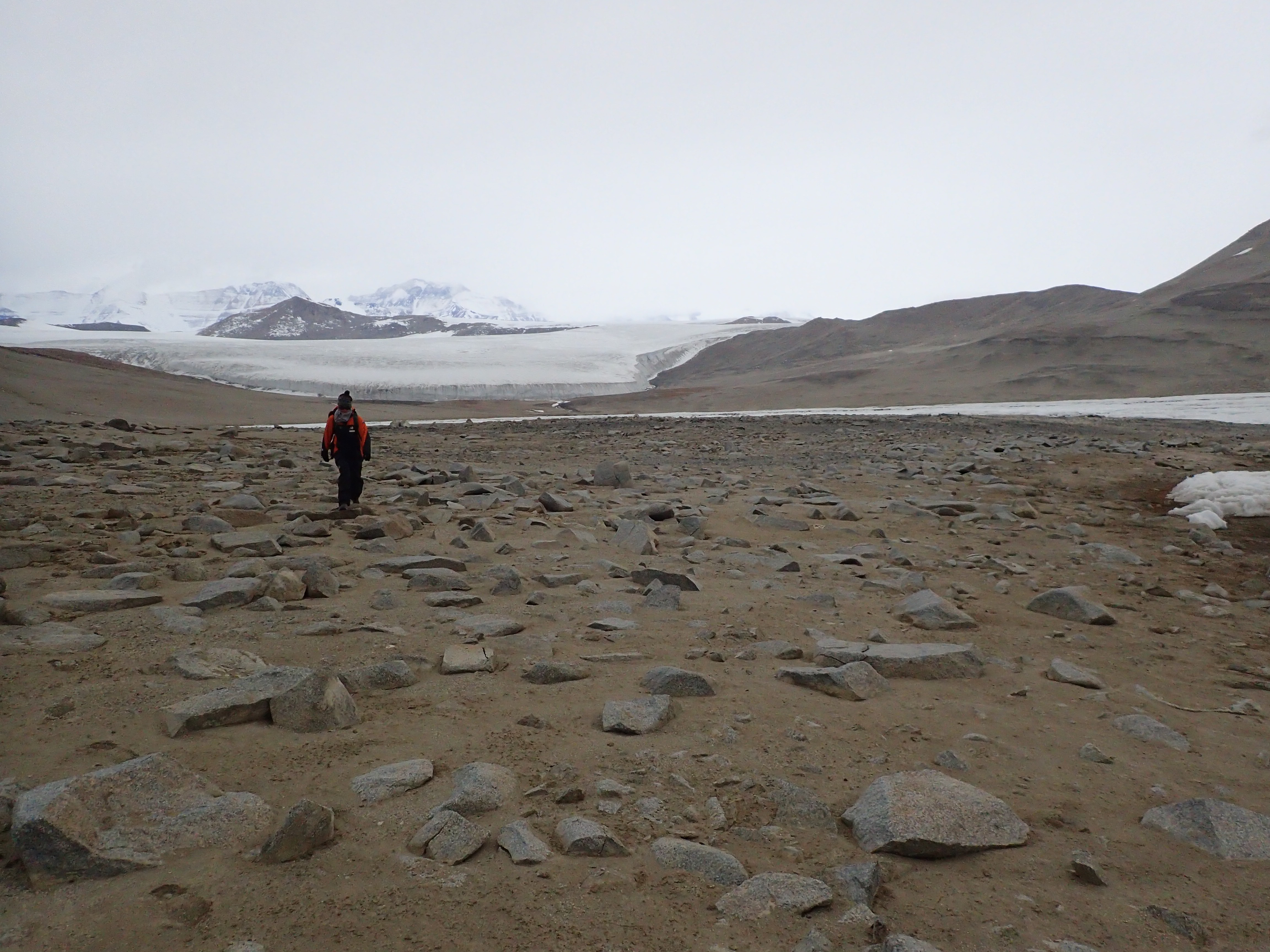
View of Shangri-la (2016)

== Sources ==
- Alberts, Fred G., ed. (1995), Geographic Names of the Antarctic (PDF) (2 ed.), United States Board on Geographic Names This article incorporates public domain material from websites or documents of the United States Board on Geographic Names.
- "Denton Hills", Geographic Names Information System, United States Geological Survey, United States Department of the Interior
- Mount Discovery, USGS: United States Geological Survey
- "Mount Steep", Geographic Names Information System, United States Geological Survey, United States Department of the Interior
- "Nostoc Flats", Geographic Names Information System, United States Geological Survey, United States Department of the Interior
- "Zetland Glacier", Geographic Names Information System, United States Geological Survey, United States Department of the Interior

This article incorporates public domain material from websites or documents of the United States Geological Survey.
