= Murray Pond =

Pond in Antarctica

Murray Pond (77°33′S 160°55′E) is a pond 0.4 nautical miles (0.7 km) east-southeast of Gupwell Pond in the Labyrinth of Wright Valley, McMurdo Dry Valleys. It is the W-most of the three aligned ponds lying south of the east part of Hoffman Ledge. Named by Advisory Committee on Antarctic Names (US-ACAN) (2004) after D.F.C. Murray, a driller with the New Zealand drilling team during the McMurdo Dry Valleys Drilling Project, 1973–76.
