= Holmes Block =

Holmes Block (78°13′S 161°35′E) is a blocklike bluff, rising to 1,855 metres (6,090 ft) at the west side of Ruecroft Glacier, 2 nautical miles (4 km) west of Cooke Bluff, in Victoria Land, Antarctica. It was named by the Advisory Committee on Antarctic Names in 1994 after John W. Holmes, a cartographer specialising in Antarctic mapping with the United States Geological Survey (USGS) Branch of Special Maps, 1951–77, and from 1977, assigned to the USGS Mapping Applications Center.
