= Orbis spike =

The Orbis Spike is a global dip in atmospheric carbon dioxide levels around the year 1610 CE, as recorded by the Antarctic sea ice record. There are several hypotheses as to what caused the dip, the chief among them being diseases brought by European explorers. This exposure to foreign pathogens then caused a rapid and drastic decrease in the native populations, leading to reforestation in the Western Hemisphere. There has been controversy raised about whether the Orbis Spike should be recognized as the beginning of the Anthropocene, as some see potential better markers.

== Name ==
The "Orbis" in Orbis spike is named for the Latin word Orbis, meaning world. Orbis was chosen to represent of the East and West hemispheres merging into one interconnected world. The "spike" refers to the usage of the Global Boundary Stratotype Section and Point to point to "golden spikes" as markers for different eras in the history of the world.

== Background ==
The decrease of carbon dioxide in Antarctic ice is noted in samples acquired from both the Law Dome and the Western Antarctic Ice Sheet. The levels of carbon dioxide decreased by an estimated 7-10ppm, which is higher than the 1-2ppm that is the usual margin of error for such measurements. While it is certain that atmospheric carbon dioxide decreased at this time, the exact mechanisms responsible for this drop are debated.

=== Foreign disease ===
The current leading theory is that after contact with Europeans in the 1490's diseases such as smallpox and cocoliztli led to the deaths of tens of millions of natives. This theory claims that the native population during the early 1500's led to previously farmed and cultivated land being reclaimed by nature. This reclamation of large swaths of land led to the regrowth of dense forests that sequestered carbon more effectively than the crops that were previously farmed there.

=== Drought ===
Another theory for the reduction of carbon dioxide is a drought in South America during the 1500's caused a reduction in aeratable land, causing populations to recede and creating a loss of previously farmed land. This proposed loss of farming would eventually lead to reclamation by nature, thereby causing the drop in carbon dioxide levels.

== Relationship to Anthropocene ==
The Orbis spike is seen by some as a place to start the Anthropocene, as the global carbon dioxide dip is of note in the ice record and coincides with major human changes to the planet. The main argument put forth is that the spike was the first time that there was any major change in the planet attributable to human interactions. If the mechanism that induced the spike was indeed human interaction, as hypothesized by some scientists, then the spike would seem a logical place to begin the Anthropocene. If the spike was not caused by humans, then other theories on the beginning of the Anthropocene may be valid as well.

== Controversy ==
The Orbis Spike is not universally agreed upon as the start of the Anthropocene, some contend that there are better places to mark the beginning of the Anthropocene. One major example is the proliferation of nuclear weapons testing in the 1940s and 1950s. This weapons testing caused a notable amount of refined plutonium to exist in rock layers globally. Those who support this event as the signifier of the Anthropocene claim that it represents the first time in human history that humanity was capable of destroying itself, and as such it should be considered the beginning of the modern human era.

Others contend that the mass cultivation of broiler chickens is a better signifier of the beginning of the Anthropocene. Those who do argue for this hypothesis say that the mass cultivation of chickens to a degree that they make a notable difference in the percentage of Earth's biomass is proof of human ability to substantially change the biosphere of the planet. This proposer marker is notable because the change occurred intentionally so that the planet is better suited to human growth and patterns of consumption. This stands in contrast to the Orbis Spike and nuclear fallout proposals because they are unintentional consequences of human exploration and scientific development.
