= Watanuki Pond =

Pond in Antarctica

Watanuki Pond (77°31′S 160°46′E) is a pond lying 1.7 nautical miles (3.1 km) south-southwest of Apollo Peak in the northwest part of the Labyrinth of Wright Valley. The pond is also positioned as being 0.25 nautical miles (0.5 km) east-northeast of Kurasawa Pond and 0.8 m east of the Wright Upper Glacier terminus. Named by Advisory Committee on Antarctic Names (US-ACAN) (2004) after Kunihiki Watanuki, Department of Chemistry, University of Tokyo, Japan; participant in the McMurdo Dry Valleys Drilling Project during the 1973-74 field season; Labyrinth pond studies, 1985–86.
