= Matsumoto Pond =

Lake in Antarctica

Matsumoto Pond (77°34′S 161°4′E) is a pond south of Dais Col and 1.4 nautical miles (2.6 km) west of Don Juan Pond in South Fork, Wright Valley, Victoria Land, Antarctica. It was named by the Advisory Committee on Antarctic Names (1997) after Japanese chemist Genki I. Matsumoto, who was a member of four Japanese Antarctic Research Expedition field parties (1976–77, 1981–82, 1983–84, 1985–86) that made geophysical and geochemical studies of ponds in the McMurdo Dry Valleys, including investigation of this feature.
