= Jacobel Glacier =

Glacier in Antarctica

Jacobel Glacier (77°44′S 148°17′W) is a glacier about 30 miles (50 km) long draining to the Sulzberger Ice Shelf, Antarctica, south of Hershey Ridge. It was named by the Advisory Committee on Antarctic Names after Robert W. Jacobel, holder of the Grace A. Whittier Chair of Physics at St. Olaf College, Northfield, Minnesota. An Antarctic researcher from the 1980s onwards, his research interests include the combination of ground-based radar and ice core studies in West Antarctica.
