= Draves Point =

Peninsula in Antarctica

Draves Point (66°4′S 101°4′E) is the westernmost point of Booth Peninsula, lying 0.3 nautical miles (0.6 km) north of the eastern portion of Thomas Island. The name "Draves Island" was given by the Advisory Committee on Antarctic Names (US-ACAN) in 1956 to the western portion of Booth Peninsula, then thought to be a separate feature. Subsequent Soviet Expeditions (1956–57) found that feature to be part of Booth Peninsula and US-ACAN has reapplied the name to the point described. It was named for Dale Draves, an air crewman on the U.S. Navy Operation Highjump seaplane commanded by D.E. Bunger which landed in this area and obtained aerial and ground photographs in February 1947.
