= Butler Summit =

Mountain in Ross Dependency, Antarctica

Butler Summit (77°33′S 161°6′E) is a peak rising to about 1,000 metres (3,300 ft) in the extreme western part of the Dais in Wright Valley, McMurdo Dry Valleys. It was named by the Advisory Committee on Antarctic Names (2004) after Rhett Butler of Incorporated Research Institutions for Seismology (IRIS); Program Manager for the Global Seismograph Network; United States Antarctic Program investigator for the South Pole Station seismic observatory installed jointly by IRIS and the United States Geological Survey.
