= Williams Pond =

Pond in Antarctica

Williams Pond (77°32′S 160°58′E) is a pond 0.4 miles (0.64 km) north of the east end of Hoffman Ledge, within the Labyrinth of Wright Valley, McMurdo Dry Valleys. The basin is named by the Advisory Committee on Antarctic Names (US-ACAN) (2004) after M.W. (Max) Williams of Hamilton, New Zealand, a driller and supervisor with the New Zealand drilling team which was on site for the Murdo Dry Valleys Drilling Project from 1973 through 1976.
