= Cape Poinsett =

Law dome with Cape Poinsett on the right edge

Cape Poinsett (65°46′S 113°13′E) is an ice-covered cape in Antarctica, the northern extremity of Budd Coast, from which the coast recedes abruptly to the southeast and southwest. The position of Cape Poinsett correlates closely with the high seaward extremity of "Budd's High Land" as charted in 1840 by the United States Exploring Expedition under Lt. Charles Wilkes. The cape was plotted from air photos taken by USN Operation Highjump, 1946–48, and named by the Advisory Committee on Antarctic Names (US-ACAN) after Joel R. Poinsett, Secretary of War under President Martin Van Buren, who was instrumental in the compilation and publication of the large number of scientific reports based on the work of the United States Exploring Expedition.
