= Cape Henderson =

Ice-free cape in Antarctica

Cape Henderson (66°11′S 100°44′E) is an ice-free cape, overlain by morainic drift, marking the northwest end of the Bunger Hills in Antarctica. It was mapped from air photos taken by U.S. Navy Operation Highjump in February 1947, and was named by the Advisory Committee on Antarctic Names for the USS Henderson (DD-785), the destroyer escort of the western task group of Operation Highjump, Task Force 68, 1946–47.
