= Mount Obiglio =

Mountain in Marie Byrd Land, Antarctica

Mount Obiglio (74°27′S 131°50′W) is a moderate rock summit (510 m) in the west-central portion of Grant Island, along the edge of the Getz Ice Shelf, coastal Marie Byrd Land. It consists of a volcanic cone that was formed by Strombolian and phreatomagmatic eruptions 0.51 million years ago.

Discovered and charted from the USS 1961–62. Named by Advisory Committee on Antarctic Names (US-ACAN) for Lieutenant G.M. Obiglio, Argentine naval observer aboard Glacier, at the suggestion of the Task Unit Commander, Captain Edwin A. McDonald, USN.
