= Colvocoresses Bay =

Bay in Antarctica

Colvocoresses Bay (66°21′S 114°38′E) is a bay formed by the right angle of the Budd Coast at Williamson Glacier. The bay is over 30 nautical miles (56 km) wide at the entrance and is occupied by glacier tongues and icebergs from Williamson Glacier and Whittle Glacier. It was delineated by Gardner Dean Blodgett (1955) from aerial photographs taken by U.S. Navy Operation Highjump (1946–47), and named by the Advisory Committee on Antarctic Names for George Colvocoresses, midshipman on the sloop Vincennes during the United States Exploring Expedition (1838–42) under Charles Wilkes. Colvocoresses, later promoted to captain, U.S. Navy, published (1852–55) his own account of the voyage in Four Years in the Government Exploring Expedition Commanded by Captain Wilkes.
