= Kerr Inlet =

Kerr Inlet (80°4′S 160°15′E) is an ice-filled inlet, 1 nautical mile (2 km) wide, located at the west side of Cape Kerr in the northern part of Barne Inlet, Antarctica. It was named by the Advisory Committee on Antarctic Names in association with Cape Kerr.
