= Mohaupt Point =

Mohaupt Point (66°4′S 100°47′E) is the eastern point of Currituck Island, in the Highjump Archipelago, Antarctica. The name "Mohaupt Island" was given by Advisory Committee on Antarctic Names (US-ACAN) in 1956 to the northern portion of Currituck Island, then thought to be a separate feature. Subsequent Soviet expeditions in 1956–57 found that feature to be part of Currituck Island and US-ACAN has reapplied the name to the point described. It is named for H.E. Mohaupt, an air crewman on U.S. Navy Operation Highjump photographic flights in this area in 1946–47.
