= Gealy Spur =

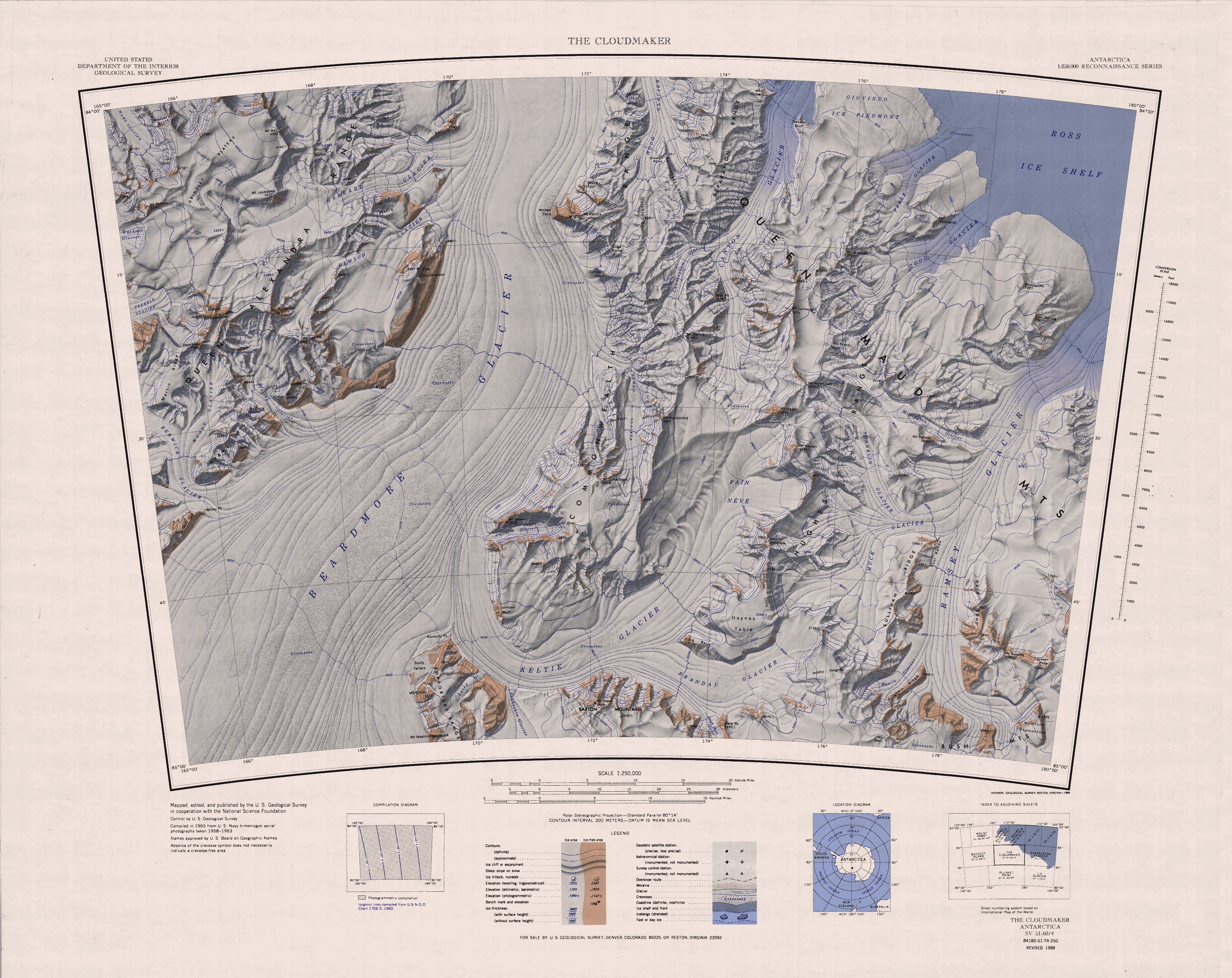

Gealy Spur (84°38′S 165°13′E) is a high rock spur on the west side of Beardmore Glacier, Antarctica. The spur descends northeast from Mount Marshall and terminates in Willey Point. This area was first sighted by Ernest Shackleton's Southern Journey Party in December 1908. The spur was named by the Advisory Committee on Antarctic Names for William J. Gealy, a stratigrapher with the Ohio State University Geological Expedition of 1969–70, who worked the spur and found tetrapod fossils here.
