= Glover Cirque =

Cirque on Mount Boreas, Antarctica

Glover Cirque (77°30′S 161°5′E) is a cirque occupied by a glacier in the south part of the Mount Boreas massif; the cirque is bounded on the northeast side by a ridge connecting Mount Boreas and Mount Thrace. It was named by Advisory Committee on Antarctic Names (2004) after Robert P. Glover, cartographer, Geography Discipline, U.S. Geological Survey; five field seasons in Antarctica up to 2003–04.
