= DeVries Bluff =

DeVries Bluff (80°19′S 157°45′E) is a steep bluff rising to 1,660 metres (5,450 ft) on the north side of Byrd Glacier. The feature is immediately east of DeVries Glacier, where the latter enters Byrd Glacier. The bluff was named by the Advisory Committee on Antarctic Names in association with DeVries Glacier. Biologist Arthur L. DeVries conducted research on freezing avoidance of McMurdo Sound fishes at the United States Antarctic Program McMurdo Station over four decades, 1960–61 through 2001–02 field seasons.
