= Stuart Point =

Stuart Point (66°28′S 125°10′E) is an ice-covered point at the east side of the entrance to Maury Bay. Delineated from aerial photographs taken by U.S. Navy Operation Highjump (1946–47), and named by the Advisory Committee on Antarctic Names (US-ACAN) after Frederick D. Stuart, captain's clerk on the sloop Peacock of the United States Exploring Expedition under Wilkes (1838–42), who assisted Wilkes with correction of the survey data obtained by the expedition.
