= Cape Polar Star =

Cape Polar Star (73°38′S 169°40′E) is a bold cape which forms the southwest extremity of Coulman Island in northwestern Ross Sea. Named by Advisory Committee on Antarctic Names (US-ACAN) in 1987 after USCGC activities in Antarctica, including the Ross Sea, since Operation Deep Freeze, 1978. A survey of this feature was conducted from Polar Star in 1986.
