= Law Dome =

Ice dome in Antarctica

Coordinates: 66°44′S 112°50′E

Law dome

Law Dome is a large ice dome which rises to 1,395 metres (4,580 ft) directly south of Cape Poinsett, Antarctica. The feature was roughly mapped by the United States Geological Survey from aerial photographs taken by U.S. Navy Operation Highjump, 1946–47, and has been the subject of intensive glaciological and geophysical surveys by Australian National Antarctic Research Expeditions between 1962 and 1965. It was named by the Antarctic Names Committee of Australia for Phillip Law, Director of the Australian Antarctic Division from 1949 to 1966.

The dome is bounded by the Totten Glacier to the east and the Vanderford Glacier to the west. The dome itself is host to the Williamson Glacier and several other much smaller glaciers on its northern face.
