= Melcon Peak =

Mountain in Antarctica

Melcon Peak (77°27′S 160°25′E) is an ice-covered peak rising to 2,500 metres (8,200 ft) 1.1 nautical miles (2 km) south of Shapeless Mountain in Victoria Land, Antarctica. There is exposed rock on the south side of this wedge-shaped elevation. The peak was named by the Advisory Committee on Antarctic Names (2004) after Mark ("Commander") Melcon, a McMurdo Station carpenter who worked 23 field seasons in Antarctica.
