= Jones Ridge =

Ridge in Queen Mary Land, Antarctica

Jones Ridge (66°36′S 99°25′E) is a small rock ridge, marked by a sharp peak at its seaward end, protruding above the lower reaches of Denman Glacier near the point where the glacier meets the coast. It was discovered by the Western Base party of the Australasian Antarctic Expedition under Mawson, 1911–14, who applied the name "Cape Jones", believing that the feature marked the western end of the prominent rock cliffs at the east side of Denman Glacier. He named it for Dr. Sydney Evan Jones, who served as medical officer at the Western Base and as leader of the party which extended exploration west to Gaussberg. The name Jones Ridge was reassigned on the Advisory Committee on Antarctic Names map of 1955, compiled from aerial photographs taken by U.S. Navy Operation Highjump in February 1947, because a substantial portion of the Denman Glacier flowage separates this feature from the rock cliffs to the east.
