= Shaw Trough =

Amit Yadav

Coordinates: 77°32′S 160°54′E

Shaw Trough is a primary elongate trough in the Labyrinth of Wright Valley, McMurdo Dry Valleys, extending W-E across the north part of the feature. Named by Advisory Committee on Antarctic Names (US-ACAN) (2004) after John Shaw, Department of Geography, University of Alberta, Edmonton, Canada, who, with Terry R. Healy, published observations on the formation of the Labyrinth following a visit in the 1975–76 season.
