= Barren Bluff =

Rock bluff in Victoria Land, Antarctica

Coordinates: 73°4′S 161°18′E

Barren Bluff is a prominent rock bluff in the south part of the Sequence Hills along the west side of upper Rennick Glacier, Victoria Land, Antarctica. The geographical feature was so named by the northern party of the New Zealand Geological Survey Antarctic Expedition, 1962–63, because of the extremely bare (of loose rock) and exposed nature of the surface; the party had difficulty collecting sufficient stones for construction of a survey beacon. The bluff lies on the Pennell Coast, a portion of Antarctica lying between Cape Williams and Cape Adare.
