= Gupwell Pond =

Sweetwater Pond in the Antarctic

Gupwell Pond (77°33′26″S 160°54′33″E) is a pond 0.3 nautical miles (0.6 km) south of midmost Hoffman Ledge in the Labyrinth of Wright Valley, McMurdo Dry Valleys. It was named by the Advisory Committee on Antarctic Names (2004) after J.H. Gupwell, a drilling supervisor with the New Zealand drilling team during the McMurdo Dry Valleys Drilling Project, 1973–76.
