= Mahalak Bluffs =

Line of bluffs in Graham Land, Antarctica

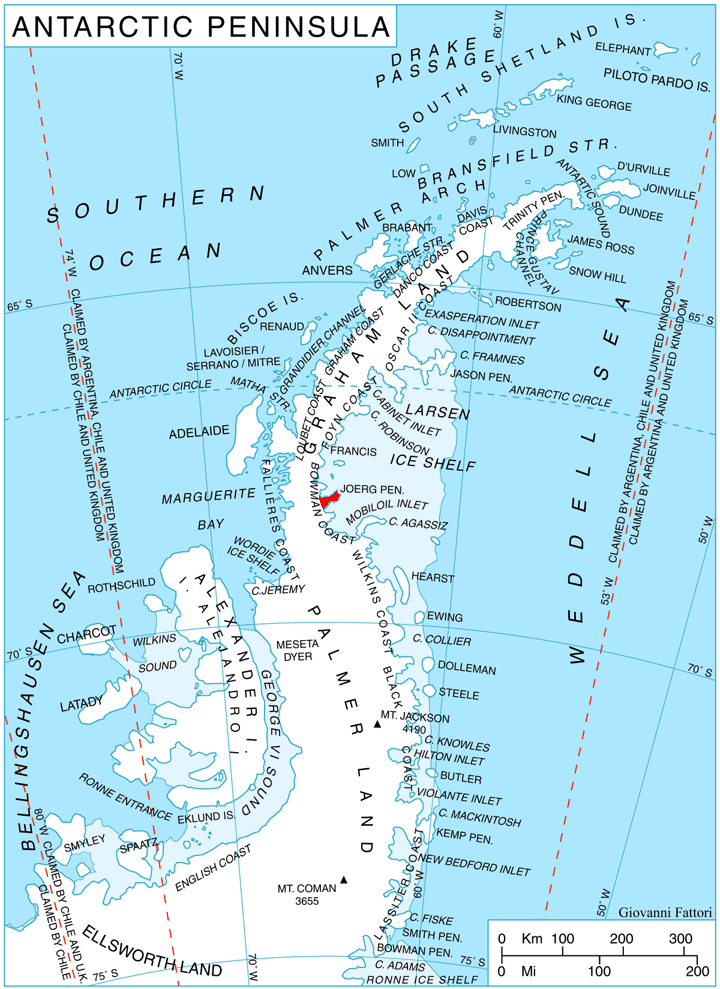
Location of Joerg Peninsula in Graham Land, Antarctic Peninsula.

The Mahalak Bluffs (68°17′S 65°23′W) are a discontinuous line of bluffs, 2 nautical miles (4 km) long, on the north side of Solberg Inlet, Bowman Coast, Antarctica. The bluffs rise to about 500 metres (1,600 ft), east of Robillard Glacier, forming part of the southwest coast of Joerg Peninsula. The feature was photographed from the air by Lincoln Ellsworth, 21 November 1935, and was mapped from these photographs by W.L.G. Joerg. It was named by the Advisory Committee on Antarctic Names in 1977 for Lieutenant Lawrence W. Mahalak, Jr., U.S. Navy, Medical Officer at Palmer Station for Operation Deep Freeze, 1971.
