= Dorrel Rock =

Dorrel Rock (75°26′S 111°22′W) is a nunatak located 20 km (12 mi) southwest of the summit of Mount Murphy, protruding through the ice near the head of Pope Glacier, on the Walgreen Coast, Marie Byrd Land. It was mapped by the United States Geological Survey from surveys and U.S. Navy air photos, 1959–66, and was named by the Advisory Committee on Antarctic Names after Leo E. Dorrel, U.S. Navy, a hospital corpsman with the Byrd Station winter party, 1966.

Dorrel Rock is an 2 km (1.2 mi) in diameter exposure of gabbro cut by dikes of benmoreite and trachyte. Dorrel Rock is a unique exposure of intrusive Cenozoic igneous rocks within Marie Byrd Land. The gabbro is coarse-grained and composed of labradorite, diopside and ilmenite, with minor titanomagnetite, kaersutite, biotite, and amphibole. The benmoreite dikes consist largely of sodic oligoclase, hastingsite-ferropargasite, scarce magnetite, and minor biotite. The trachyte dike is characterized by large euhedral phenocrysts of potassium feldspar. They are surrounded by microphenocrysts and groundmass composed of hastingsite, minor hedenbergite and magnetite, and trachytoid sanidine. 40Ar/39Ar dating of biotite and amphibole from the gabbro yielded an age of 34.15±0.22 Ma. Since the gabbro cooled as deep as 3 km (1.9 mi) beneath the surface, this age indicates that 3 km (1.9 mi) of the block of Antarctica's crust containing Dorrel Rock has been uplifted and removed by erosion over the past 34 million years in response the formation of the West Antarctic Rift.
