= Mount Knauff =

Mountain in Ross Dependency, Antarctica

Mount Knauff (71°36′S 169°49′E) is a mountain that rises to over 1,000 metres (3,300 ft) between Egeberg Glacier and the terminus of Dugdale Glacier on the Pennell Coast of Victoria Land, Antarctica. The east side of Mount Knauff and a spur which extends northward to Robertson Bay are marked by abrupt scarp slopes that are typical of this coast. It was named by the Advisory Committee on Antarctic Names after Major General Robert A. Knauff, chief of staff of the New York Air National Guard, who supervised five flying wings and the Eastern Air Defense Sector and was primary advisor to the adjutant general on Air Guard matters. Knauff was active in the United States Antarctic Program (USAP) from 2003 and remained a powerful voice in that governing body until retirement in 2009, being involved in many high priority USAP International Polar Year projects, including the commissioning of the new Amundsen–Scott South Pole Station in January 2008.
