= Kurasawa Pond =

Pond in Antarctica

Kurasawa Pond (77°32′S 160°45′E) is a pond in the northwestern part of the Labyrinth of Wright Valley, McMurdo Dry Valleys, Antarctica. It lies south of Dean Cirque and 0.5 nautical miles (1 km) east of the Wright Upper Glacier terminus. The pond was named by the Advisory Committee on Antarctic Names (2004) after Hajime Kurasawa of the Japan Geological Survey, a participant in the McMurdo Dry Valleys Drilling Project in the 1973–74 and 1974–75 field seasons.
