= Lasher Spur =

Lasher Spur (69°6′S 66°39′W) is a prominent mountain spur trending northwest from the Kelvin Crests, 4 nautical miles (7 km) east-northeast of the Triune Peaks, Fallières Coast, Antarctica. The spur was photographed from the air by the Ronne Antarctic Research Expedition, 1947, and the U.S. Navy, 1966, and was surveyed by the Falkland Islands Dependencies Survey, 1958. It was named in 1977 by the Advisory Committee on Antarctic Names for Lieutenant William J. Lasher, U.S. Navy, an LC-130 aircraft commander in Operation Deep Freeze, 1969 and 1970.
