= Stepping Stone Pond =

Frozen pond in Antarctica

Stepping Stone Pond (77°33′S 160°47′E) is a small freshwater frozen pond 0.4 nautical miles (0.7 km) east-northeast of Craig Pond in the Labyrinth of Wright Valley, McMurdo Dry Valleys. So named by Advisory Committee on Antarctic Names (US-ACAN) (2004) following a visit by the United States Antarctic Program (USAP) field sampling party (2003–04), which reported the pond has perfect stepping stones that allow it to be crossed easily.
