= Sevier Nunatak =

Nunatak on Alexander Island, Antarctica

Sevier Nunatak (71°22′S 70°15′W) is a nunatak lying southeast of Richter Peaks, rising to about 1,000 m at the south end of the Walton Mountains, situated in the central portion of Alexander Island, Antarctica. The nunatak was named by the Advisory Committee on Antarctic Names for Lieutenant Commander Moses T. Sevier, U. S. Navy, Assistant Chief of Staff for Supply and Logistics, U. S. Naval Support Force, Antarctica, "Operation Deep Freeze", 1968 to 1972; Assistant Supply Officer, Squadron VX-6, "Operation Deep Freeze", 1956 to 1958.

== See also ==
- Coal Nunatak
- Emerald Nunatak
- Hesperus Nunatak
