= Harrison Ice Ridge =

Ice ridge in Marie Byrd Land, Antarctica

Harrison Ice Ridge (79°30′S 146°0′W) is an ice ridge between Echelmeyer Ice Stream and MacAyeal Ice Stream on the Shirase Coast of Marie Byrd Land, Antarctica. It was named by the Advisory Committee on Antarctic Names after William D. Harrison of the Geophysics Institute at the University of Alaska, Fairbanks, a United States Antarctic Program investigator of ice flow dynamics in the margin of the nearby Whillans Ice Stream, 1992–93 and 1993–94, and at Siple Dome, 2001–02.
