= England Ridge =

England Ridge (77°2′S 162°29′E) is the northeast continuation of the glaciated steep northeast crest of Mount England, forming a snow-free rock crest with steep northwest-facing snow-free walls down to the frozen sea at the terminus of New Glacier, in Victoria Land. The feature was explored by F. Ugolini, K. Wise and H. Janetschek in January 1962. It was named by the Advisory Committee on Antarctic Names in association with Mount England.
