= John Nunatak =

Nunatak in Ellsworth Land, Antarctica

John Nunatak (81°12′S 85°19′W) is an isolated granite nunatak in Antarctica, lying 4 nautical miles (7 km) north of the Pirrit Hills. The nunatak was examined by United States Antarctic Research Program geologists Edward Thiel and Campbell Craddock on 13 December 1959, in the course of an airlifted geophysical traverse along the 88th meridian West. It was named by the Advisory Committee on Antarctic Names after steelworker Orlan F. John, U.S. Navy, who lost his life in a construction accident at McMurdo Sound, 2 November 1960.
