= Mirfak Nunatak =

Nunatak in Oates Land, Antarctica

- Location within Antarctica

Highest point
- Coordinates: 81°58′S 156°5′E

Geography
- Location: Antarctica

Mirfak Nunatak (81°58′S 156°5′E) is a nunatak near the Antarctic polar plateau, 10 nautical miles (19 km) southwest of Vance Bluff. It was named by the Advisory Committee on Antarctic Names after the USNS Mirfak, a cargo vessel in the U.S. convoy to McMurdo Sound in Operation Deep Freeze 1963.
