= Sequence Hills =

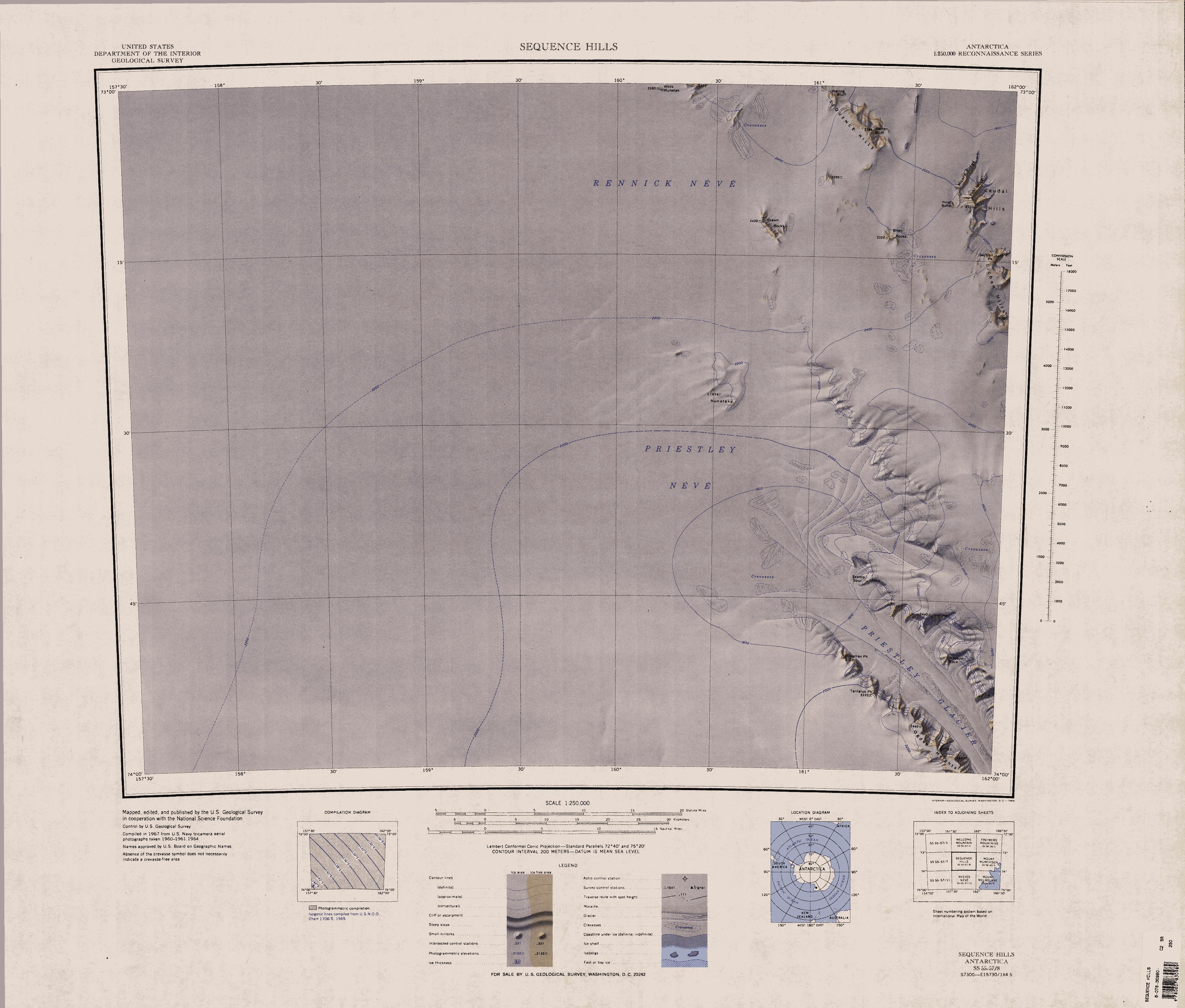
1:250,000 scale topographic map of Rennick and Priestley Névés with the Sequence Hills in the upper right corner.

Sequence Hills (73°3′S 161°15′E) is an escarpment-like hills on the west margin of the upper Rennick Glacier, about 7 nautical miles (13 km) northwest of Caudal Hills, Victoria Land. They provided the only good geological sequence in the area. Mapped and named by the northern party of New Zealand Geological Survey Antarctic Expedition (NZGSAE), 1962–63.

== See also ==
- Barren Bluff
- Waring Bluff
