= Klinck Nunatak =

Nunatak in Palmer Land, Antarctica

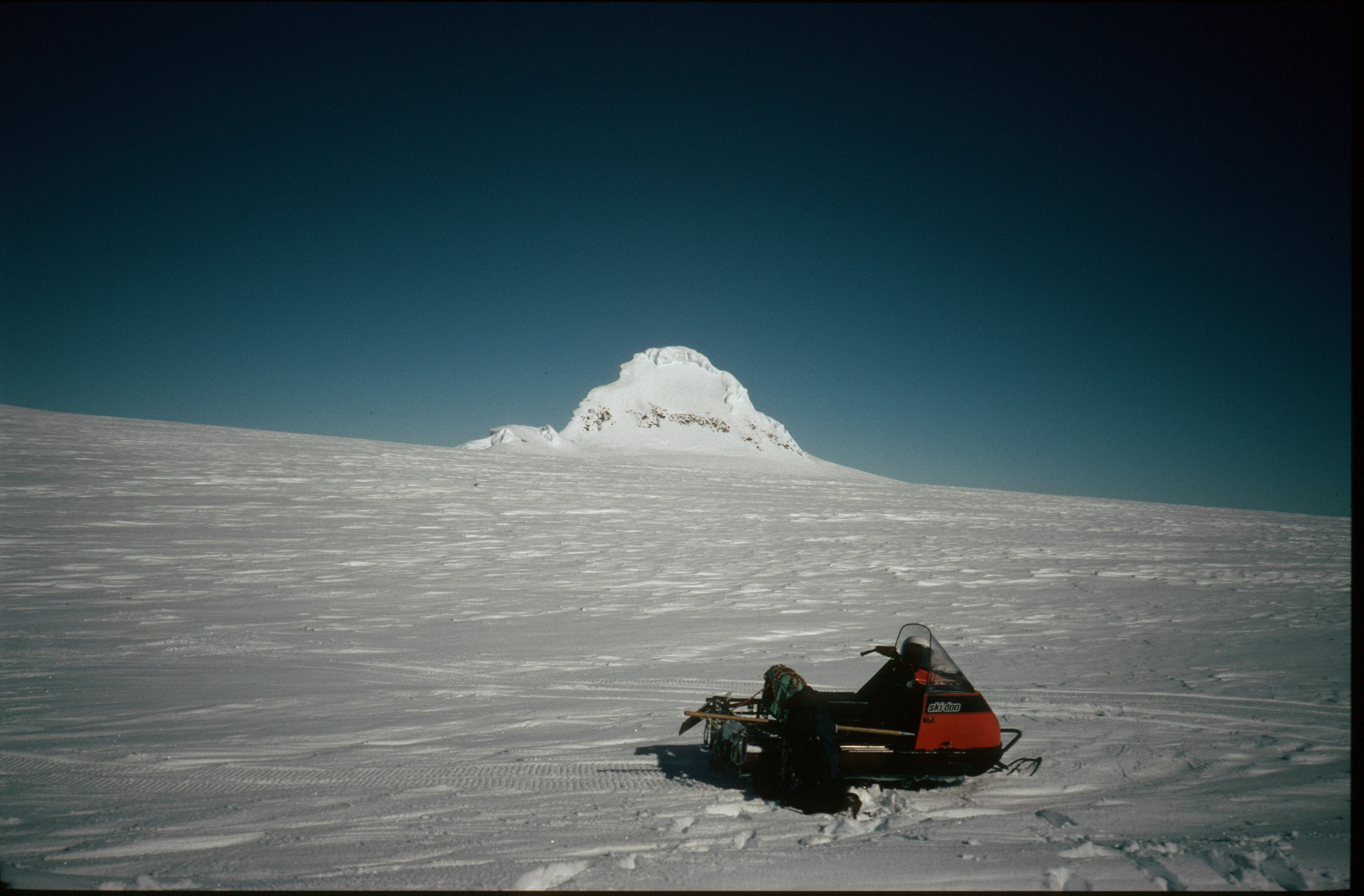
Klinck Nunatak snow-top with skidoo

Klinck Nunatak (72°4′S 63°59′W) is an isolated nunatak rising to about 1,800 metres (5,900 ft) between the Blanchard Nunataks and the Holmes Hills in south-central Palmer Land, Antarctica. It was mapped by the United States Geological Survey from aerial photographs taken by the U.S. Navy, 1966–69, and was named by the Advisory Committee on Antarctic Names in 1977 for Jay C. Klinck, U.S. Navy, a construction mechanic at Palmer Station, winter party 1970, who also provided United States Antarctic Research Program operational support at Siple Station, winter party 1973.
