= Banded Bluff =

Bluff in Antarctica

- Bluff
- Location within Antarctica
- Coordinates: 85°20′S 169°30′W
- Location: Antarctica
- Part of: Liv Glacier
- Etymology: Alternating bands of snow and rock which mark the steep face of the bluff

Dimensions
  - Length: 4 nautical miles (7 km)
- Elevation: 3 nautical miles (6 km)

Banded Bluff (85°20′S 169°30′W) is a prominent bluff in Antarctica. It is about 4 nautical miles (7 km) long, rising 3 nautical miles (6 km) southeast of McKinley Nunatak, where it forms a part of the east wall of Liv Glacier. It was so named by the Advisory Committee on Antarctic Names because of the alternate bands of snow and rock which mark the steep face of the bluff.
