= Havola Escarpment =

Antarctic escarpment

- Location within Antarctica

Geography
- Continent: Antarctica
- Area: Ellsworth Land
- Range coordinates: 84°45′S 98°40′W

The Havola Escarpment (84°45′S 98°40′W) is an isolated, snow-covered escarpment about 30 nautical miles (56 km; 35 mi) northwest of the Thiel Mountains in Antarctica. The escarpment is arc shaped, 30 nautical miles (56 km; 35 mi), and faces south.

== Discovery and naming ==
The Havola Escarpment was observed and mapped by the United States Antarctic Research Program (USARP) Horlick Mountains Traverse party, 1958–59, and was named by the Advisory Committee on Antarctic Names (US-ACAN) for Major Antero Havola, United States Army, the leader of the 700 nautical miles (1,300 km; 810 mi) tractor traverse from Byrd Station to South Pole Station from 8 December 1960, to 11 January 1961. On 25 December 1960, the Havola party passed a few miles northward of this escarpment.

== Location ==
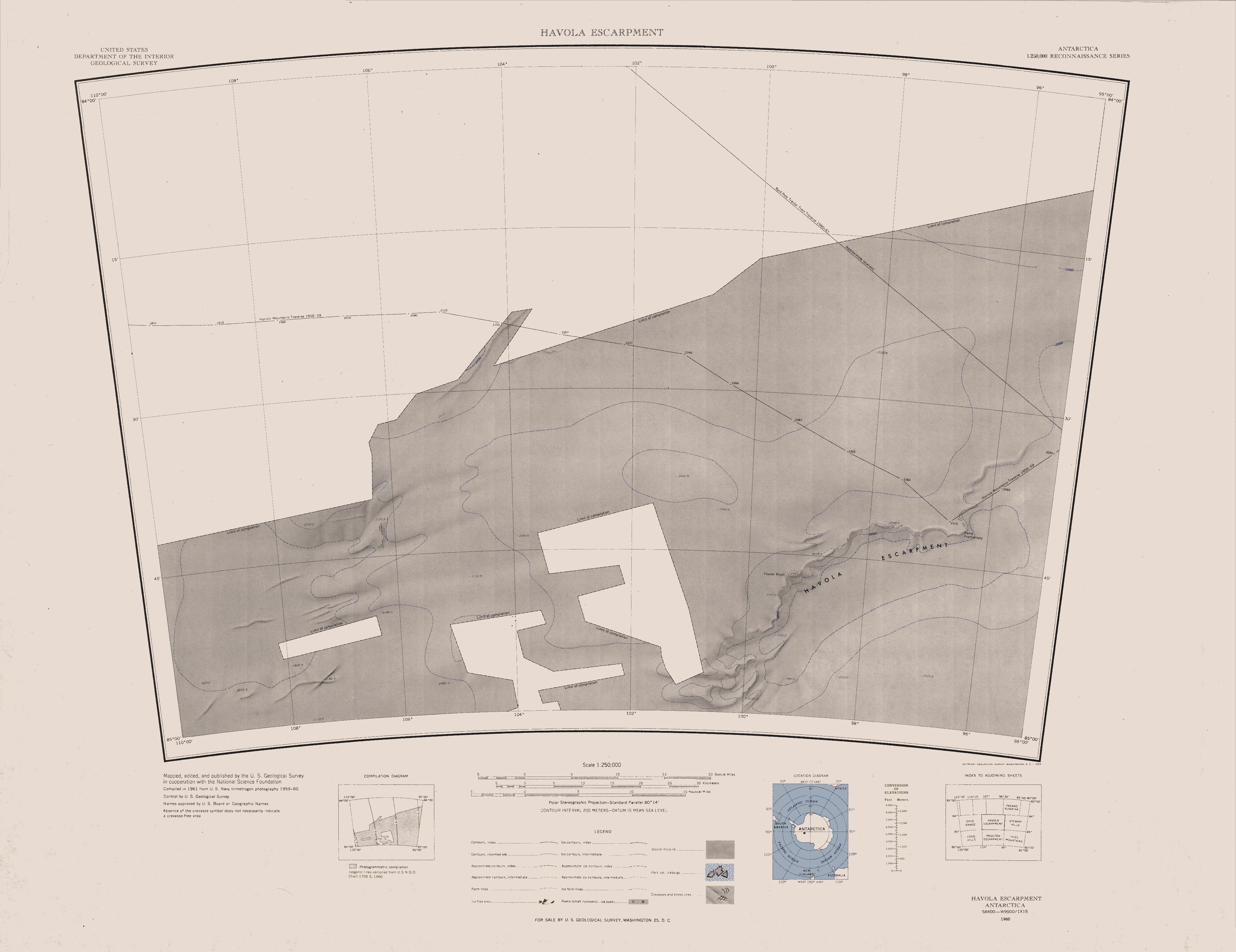
Havola Escarpment

The Havola Escarpment extends in an east-northeast direction from Fowler Knoll at the western end to Davis Promontory at the eastern end. There are no nearby named features.

=== Fowler Knoll ===
84°47′S 99°14′W. A notable snow-covered knoll, 2,465 metres (8,087 ft) high, with an abrupt south-facing cliff, in the west-central part of the Havola Escarpment. Mapped by the USGS from surveys and United States Navy air photos, 1958-61. Named by US-ACAN for Chief Warrant Officer George W. Fowler, USA, navigator on the 700 nautical mile tractor traverse from Byrd Station to South Pole Station, 8 December 1960 to 11 January 1961. The tractor party, led by Major Antero Havola, passed a few miles northward of this knoll on 25 December 1960.

=== Davis Promontory ===
84°41′S 96°30′W. A low promontory, completely snow covered, near the northeast end of Havola Escarpment. This promontory which faces southward was occupied by the USARP Horlick Mountains Traverse party, 1960-61. Named by US-ACAN for Walter L. Davis, Chief Construction Mechanic, USN, who wintered over at Ellsworth Station, 1957, and Byrd Station, 1960. Davis was a member of the 11-man tractor party, led by Major Antero Havola, that journeyed from Byrd Station to South Pole Station, 1960-61. On 25 December 1960, the party passed a few miles northward of this promontory.

== Sources ==
- Alberts, Fred G., ed. (1995), Geographic Names of the Antarctic (PDF) (2 ed.), United States Board on Geographic Names This article incorporates public domain material from websites or documents of the United States Board on Geographic Names.
- Havola Escarpment, USGS: United States Geological Survey

This article incorporates public domain material from websites or documents of the United States Geological Survey.
