= Wunneburger Rock =

Wunneburger Rock (74°42′S 113°10′W) is an isolated rock outcrop in Maunee Ice Piedmont, lower Kohler Glacier, on the Walgreen Coast, Marie Byrd Land. Mapped by United States Geological Survey (USGS) from surveys and U.S. Navy air photos, 1959–66. Named by Advisory Committee on Antarctic Names (US-ACAN) after Henry E. Wunneburger, U.S. Navy, cook with the Byrd Station winter party, 1966.
