= Redondo Point =

Redondo Point (65°12′S 64°6′W) is a small point just west of Blanchard Ridge on the west coast of Graham Land. The Advisory Committee on Antarctic Names (US-ACAN) has approved Redondo (round) for this point on the basis of prior naming on an Argentine chart of 1957. The name "Moot Point" is used for this feature on later British maps.
