= Demas Range =

Mountain range in Antarctica

- Location within Antarctica

Geography
- Continent: Antarctica
- Region: Marie Byrd Land
- Range coordinates: 75°0′S 133°45′W

The Demas Range (75°0′S 133°45′W) is a range about 8 nautical miles (15 km; 9.2 mi) long that forms the lower east margin of the Berry Glacier in Marie Byrd Land, Antarctica. The range trends north–south culminating in Mount Goorhigian, 1,115 metres (3,658 ft) high.

== Location ==
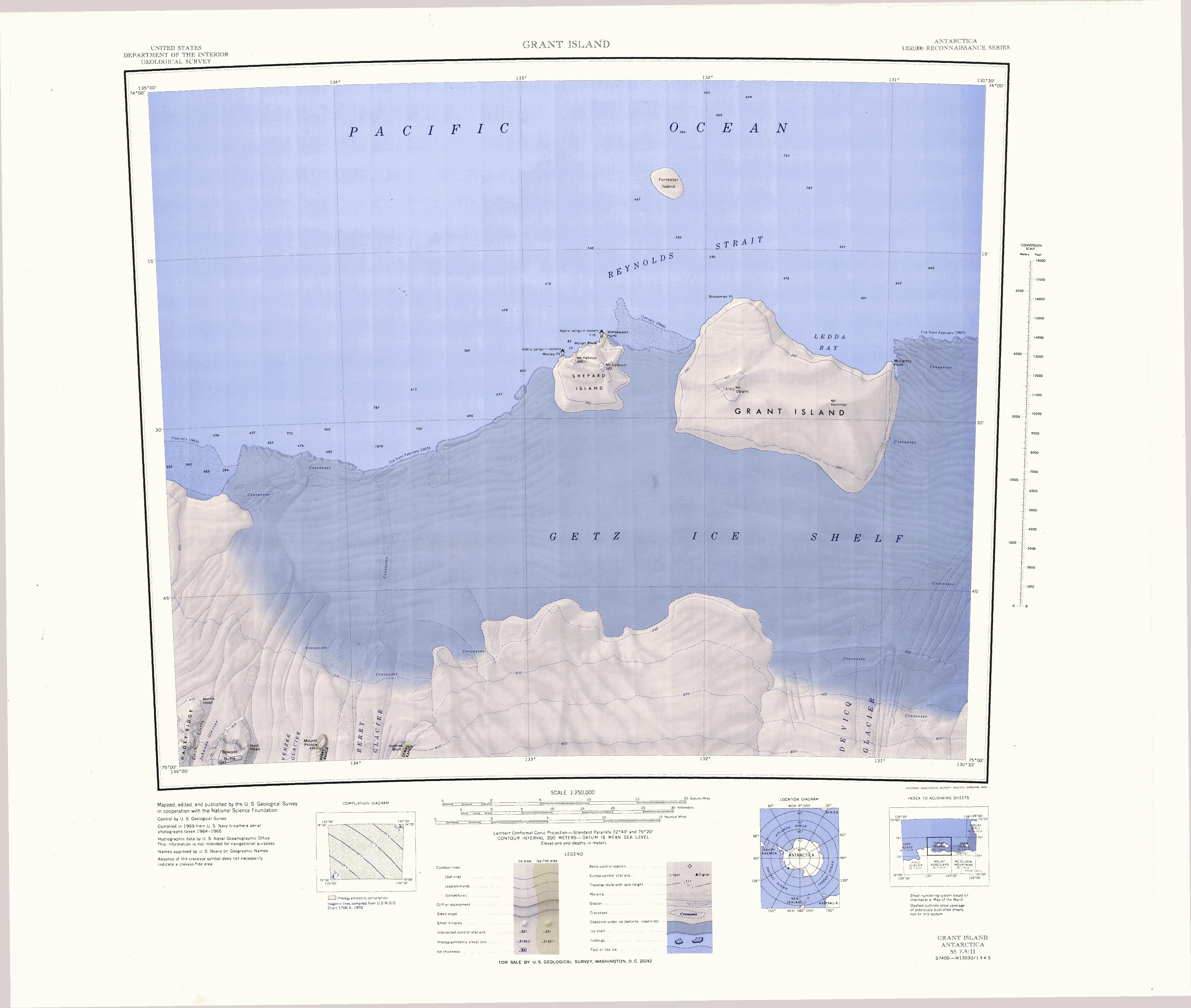
Demas Range in southwest of map

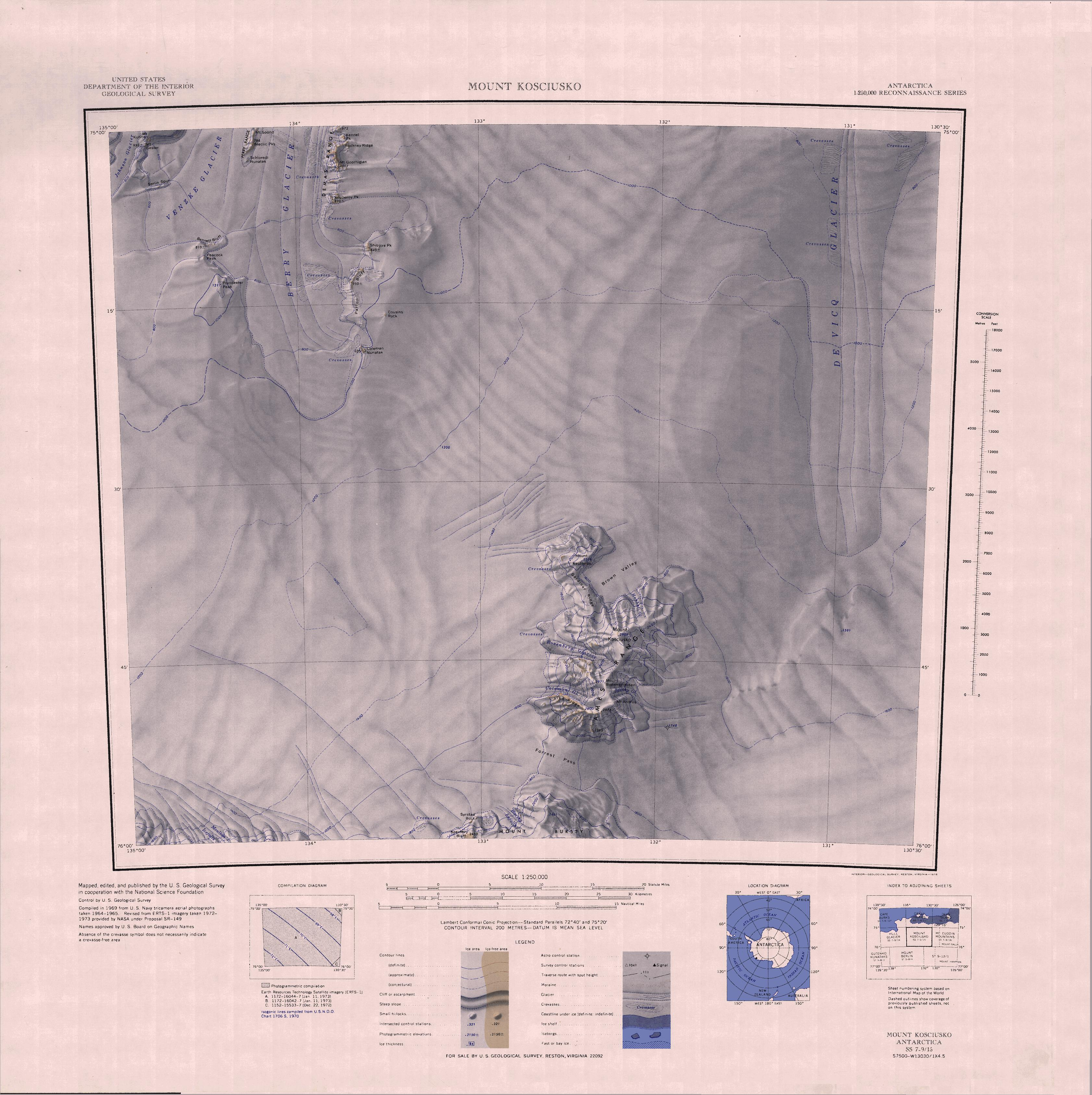
Demas Range in northwest of map

The Demas Range is northeast of the Ames Range and east of the Perry Range, from which it is separated by the Berry Glacier. It is west of the DeVicq Glacier. It extends north to the Getz Ice Shelf. Features, from north to south, include Holmes Bluff, Kennel Peak, Rockney Ridge, Mount Goorhigian and Kouperov Peak. Features further south, to the east of the Berry Glacier, include Shibuya Peak, Patton Bluff, Cousins Rock and Coleman Nunatak.

== Discovery and naming ==
The Demas Range was discovered by the United States Antarctic Service (USAS), 1939–1941, led by Admiral Richard E. Byrd. It was named by the United States Advisory Committee on Antarctic Names (US-ACAN) for E.J. "Pete" Demas, a member of the Byrd Antarctic Expeditions of 1928–1930 and 1933–1935.

== Features ==
=== Holmes Bluff ===
74°59′S 133°43′W. A bluff marking the north end of Demas Range. The feature was observed from aircraft of the United States Antarctic Service, 1939-41, but was first mapped in detail by the United States Geological Survey (USGS), 1959-65. Named by US-ACAN for Thomas J. Holmes, USARP meteorologist at Byrd Station, 1961.

=== Kennel Peak ===
75°01′S 133°44′W. A small but notable rock peak over 800 metres (2,600 ft) high about 0.5 nautical miles (0.93 km; 0.58 mi) north of Rockney Ridge. Mapped by USGS from surveys and United States Navy air photos, 1959-69. Named by US-ACAN for A. Alexander Kennel, ionospheric physicist, Station Scientific Leader at South Pole Station, 1969.

=== Rockney Ridge ===
75°02′S 133°45′W. A rock ridge on the northeast side of Mount Goorhigian. Mapped by USGS from surveys and United States Navy air photos, 1959-65. Named by US-ACAN for Vaughn D. Rockney, meteorologist at Byrd Station, 1968-69.

=== Mount Goorhigian ===
75°03′S 133°46′W. The highest mountain, 1,115 metres (3,658 ft) high, of the Demas Range. Mapped by USGS from surveys and United States Navy air photos, 1959-65. Named by US-ACAN after Martin Goorhigian, USARP meteorologist at Byrd Station, 1961.

=== Kouperov Peak ===
75°06′S 133°48′W. A peak 890 metres (2,920 ft) high at the south end of the Demas Range. Mapped by USGS from surveys and United States Navy air photos, 1959-65. Named by US-ACAN for Leonid Kouperov, Soviet Exchange Scientist (ionospheric physicist) to the United States Byrd Station, 1961.

== Nearby features ==
=== Shibuya Peak ===
75°10′S 133°35′W. A rocky summit 840 metres (2,760 ft) high on the east side of Berry Glacier, 4 nautical miles (7.4 km; 4.6 mi) southeast of Demas Range. Mapped by USGS from surveys and United States Navy air photos, 1959-65. Named by US-ACAN for Franklin T. Shibuya, USARP meteorologist at Byrd Station, 1962.

=== Patton Bluff ===
75°13′S 133°40′W. A bluff situated between Shibuya Peak and Coleman Nunatak on the east side of Berry Glacier. Mapped by USGS from surveys and United States Navy air photos, 1959-65. Named by US-ACAN for Delbert E. Patton, USARP ionospheric physicist at Byrd Station, 1962.

=== Cousins Rock ===
75°16′S 133°31′W. An isolated rock located eastward of the upper part of Berry Glacier and Patton Bluff, about 3.5 nautical miles (6.5 km; 4.0 mi) northeast of Coleman Nunatak. Mapped by USGS from surveys and United States Navy air photos, 1959-65. Named by US-ACAN for Michael D. Cousins, ionospheric physicist at Siple Station, 1969-70.

=== Coleman Nunatak ===
75°19′S 133°39′W. A nunatak located near the head of Berry Glacier, 2 nautical miles (3.7 km; 2.3 mi) south of Patton Bluff. Mapped by USGS from surveys and United States Navy air photos, 1959-65. Named by US-ACAN after Richard I. Coleman, USARP meteorologist at Byrd Station, 1962.

== Sources ==
- Alberts, Fred G., ed. (1995), Geographic Names of the Antarctic (PDF) (2 ed.), United States Board on Geographic Names This article incorporates public domain material from websites or documents of the United States Board on Geographic Names.
- Grant Island, USGS: United States Geological Survey
- Mount Kosciusco, USGS: United States Geological Survey
- This article incorporates public domain material from websites or documents of the United States Geological Survey.
