= Hall Bluff =

Rock bluff in Victoria Land, Antarctica

Hall Bluff (77°33′16″S 161°23′30″E) is a prominent rock bluff, 750 metres (2,460 ft) high, that forms the east end of Dais and marks the valley entrances to North Fork and South Fork in Wright Valley, Victoria Land, Antarctica. It was named by the Advisory Committee on Antarctic Names (1997) after Brenda Hall, a research assistant at the department of geological sciences, University of Maine, from 1990, and a field party geologist in six United States Antarctic Program-supported field seasons, 1990–91 to 1995–96, including work in Wright Valley in the proximity of this bluff.
