= Durrance Inlet =

Inlet in Antarctica

Durrance Inlet (73°50′S 16°30′W) is an ice-filled inlet 10 nautical miles (19 km) north of Veststraumen Glacier along the Princess Martha Coast of Antarctica. The inlet is 5 nautical miles (9 km) wide, recedes 12 nautical miles (22 km), and opens to the Riiser-Larsen Ice Shelf. It was plotted by the United States Geological Survey from aerial photographs obtained by U.S. Navy Squadron VXE-6 in a November 5, 1967 reconnaissance flight over this coast, and was named by the Advisory Committee on Antarctic Names for Lieutenant Frank M. Durrance, Jr. of the U.S. Navy Reserve, a navigator on that flight.
