= Davis Knoll =

Davis Knoll (82°10′S 155°1′E) is a partly ice-covered knoll, standing 6 nautical miles (11 km) north of Mount Ester at the head of Lucy Glacier. It was mapped by the United States Geological Survey from tellurometer surveys and Navy air photos, 1960–62, and was named by the Advisory Committee on Antarctic Names for Thomas C. Davis, Jr., a United States Antarctic Research Program geologist at McMurdo Station, 1961–62.
