= Motherway Island =

Antarctic island

Coordinates: 66°26′S 110°31′E

Motherway Island is a small rocky island about 0.2 nautical miles (0.4 km) north of Peterson Island, near the south end of the Windmill Islands of Antarctica. It was first mapped from aerial photographs taken by U.S. Navy Operation Highjump in February 1947. It was named by the Advisory Committee on Antarctic Names for Paul T. Motherway, a member of one of the two Operation Windmill photographic units which obtained aerial and ground photographic coverage of this area in January 1948.

== See also ==
- List of antarctic and sub-antarctic islands
