= Raymond Ice Ridge =

Raymond Ice Ridge (81°35′S 135°0′W) is an Antarctic ice ridge located between Bindschadler Ice Stream and Kamb Ice Stream on Siple Coast, Marie Byrd Land. Siple Dome is at the west end of the ridge. It was named by the Advisory Committee on Antarctic Names (US-ACAN) after Charles F. Raymond, Professor Emeritus at the University of Washington, who studied the glacial history and evolution of the Marie Byrd Land ice stream system, with work on Siple Dome and the adjacent Bindschadler and Kamb ice streams in several field seasons between 1994 and 2002.
