= McAllister Hills =

Mountain range in Antarctica

- Location within Antarctica

Geography
- Continent: Antarctica
- Region: Victoria Land
- Range coordinates: 77.474837°S 160.36846°E

The McAllister Hills (77.474°S 160.368°E) are a hill group or bastion between Shapeless Mountain and Wright Upper Glacier in Victoria Land, Antarctica.

== Name ==
The McAllister Hills were named by the United States Advisory Committee on Antarctic Names (US-ACAN) in 2004 after Major George R. McAllister of the 109th Airlift Wing, New York Air National Guard, an LC-130 command pilot in a pre-season McMurdo Station to South Pole Station flight on October 16, 1999.

== Features ==
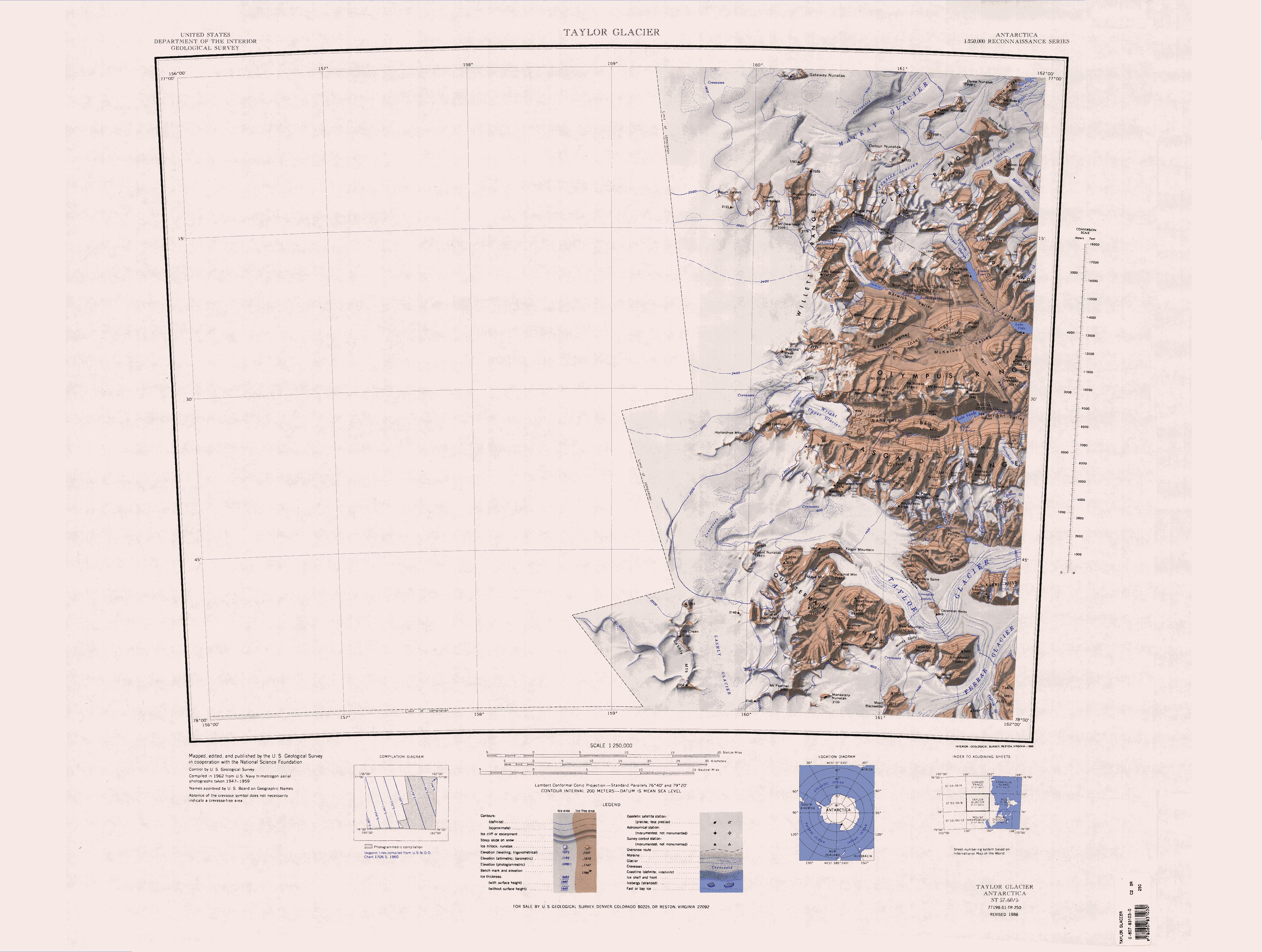
McAllister Hills north of center of mapped region

=== Koltermann Peak ===
77.479264°S 160.378169°E. A peak 2,166 metres (7,106 ft) high in the east part of McAllister Hills. Named by US-ACAN (2004) after Major David Koltermann, 109th Airlift Wing, New York Air National Guard, co-pilot of the LC-130 aircraft in a pre-season McMurdo to South Pole Station flight, October 16, 1999.

=== Hawthorne Bluff ===
77.486096°S 160.354972°E. A rock bluff at the south end of McAllister Hills. Named by US-ACAN (2004) after Ann Parks Hawthorne, photographer, Washington, D.C., who photodocumented the United States Antarctic Program in several field seasons, 1984-2003.

=== Delinski Glacier ===
77.509842°S 160.337651°E. A glacier flowing south into Wright Upper Glacier between McAllister Hills and Prentice Plateau. Named by US-ACAN (2004) after George F. Delinski, Jr., Geography Discipline, United States Geological Survey, cartographic technician in the preparation of United States Geological Survey (USGS) maps of Antarctica, 1966-2004.

== Sources ==
- "Delinski Glacier", Geographic Names Information System, United States Geological Survey, United States Department of the Interior
- "Hawthorne Bluff", Geographic Names Information System, United States Geological Survey, United States Department of the Interior
- "Koltermann Peak", Geographic Names Information System, United States Geological Survey, United States Department of the Interior
- "McAllister Hills", Geographic Names Information System, United States Geological Survey, United States Department of the Interior

This article incorporates public domain material from websites or documents of the United States Geological Survey.
