= Kelvin Crests =

Antarctic geography

The Kelvin Crests (69°10′S 66°35′W) are a line of steep-sided elevations with ice-covered cliffs 5 nautical miles (9 km) long, on the north side of Airy Glacier near its junction with Forster Ice Piedmont on the west side of the Antarctic Peninsula. Roughly surveyed by the British Graham Land Expedition in 1936–37, they were photographed from the air by the Ronne Antarctic Research Expedition in 1947. They were surveyed from the ground, from the southwest only, by members of the Falkland Islands Dependencies Survey, in December 1958 and completely mapped by the United States Geological Survey, 1974. The feature was named by the UK Antarctic Place-Names Committee for William Thomson, 1st Baron Kelvin, a British physicist and engineer who made substantial improvements in the design of magnetic compasses, 1873–78 and invented the Thomson sounding machine in 1878.
