= Ruecroft Glacier =

Glacier in Antarctica

Ruecroft Glacier (78°13′S 161°40′E) is a glacier named after George Ruecroft, United States Geological Survey (USGS) cartographic technician in Special Maps Branch, about 1960–84, a specialist in Antarctic mapping.
