= Guy Ferri =

Italian-American US diplomat (1922–1991)

Deputy Representative of the International Atomic Energy Agency to the United Nations
- In office 1972–1983

Personal details
- Born: Gaetano Ferri; July 7, 1922 Loreto Aprutino, Italy
- Died: July 8, 1991 (aged 69) Palm Coast, Florida, US
- Spouse: Teresa Bursley
- Education: Georgetown University

Military service
- Allegiance: United States
- Branch/service: United States Air Force Reserve
- Rank: Captain

Guy Ferri (July 7, 1922 – July 8, 1991) was a United States diplomat and United Nations official who served as a State Department foreign service officer from 1954 to 1972 and as the deputy representative of the International Atomic Energy Agency to the United Nations from 1972 to 1983.

== Early life ==
Born as Gaetano Ferri in Loreto Aprutino, Italy, on July 7, 1922, to Assunta and Pasquale Ferri. The Ferri family immigrated to the United States when he was a young child and settled in Hamburg, Pennsylvania.

== Military career ==
Upon completion of high school in Hamburg, Ferri then served in the United States Army as a sergeant in North Africa and Europe during World War II and later served as a captain in the United States Air Force Reserve. Ferri completed his undergraduate studies at Georgetown University's Edmund A. Walsh School of Foreign Service and earned a master's degree in public administration from Harvard University. He married Teresa Bursley in 1955.

== Political career ==
During his career as a foreign service officer with the State Department he was stationed with his family in numerous United States embassies including Buenos Aires; Saigon, South Vietnam; and Asunción, Paraguay, as well as a multitude of assignments in Washington, D.C. He was fluent in English, Italian, Spanish, and French.

Ferri resided in Rye, New York, during his time as deputy representative of the International Atomic Energy Agency to the United Nations and then retired with his wife to Palm Coast, Florida.
