= Akhouri Sinha =

Indian geneticist

Akhouri Sinha is a professor in the Department of Genetics, Cell Biology and Development at the University of Minnesota. The United States has named a mountain in Antarctica in honour of Sinha, Mt Sinha. Mr Sinha's native place is Churamanpur, a village in the state of Bihar in the eastern part of India.
