= Oliver Island, Antarctica =

Antarctic island

Oliver Island
- Location within Antarctic Peninsula

Geography
- Location: Antarctica
- Coordinates: 69°19′S 68°37′W

Administration
- Administered under the Antarctic Treaty System

Demographics
- Population: Uninhabited

Oliver Island in the Antarctic is the largest of the Mica Islands, lying outside the entrance to West Bay and 11 kilometres (6 nmi) northeast of Cape Jeremy in south Marguerite Bay. Named by Advisory Committee on Antarctic Names (US-ACAN) in 1977 for David L. Oliver, CS1, U.S. Navy, cook, Palmer Station, winter party 1972.

== See also ==
- List of Antarctic and sub-Antarctic islands
