= Wall Range =

Mountain range in Antarctica

Coordinates: 64°49′S 63°22′W

Wall Range is a mountain range, 3 nautical miles (5.6 km; 3.5 mi) long in a NE-SW direction with steep wall-like cliffs and jagged peaks rising to 1,095 metres (3,593 ft), extending from Thunder Glacier to Channel Glacier in the center of Wiencke Island, in the Palmer Archipelago. First mapped by the Belgian Antarctic Expedition, 1897–99, under Gerlache. Surveyed in 1944 by the Falkland Islands Dependencies Survey (FIDS) and given this descriptive name.
