= Brodie Ponds =

Group of lakes in Antarctica

Brodie Ponds (77°57′S 163°42′E) are a group of meltwater ponds lying west and southwest of the base of Mount Kowalczyk on the surface of the Blue Glacier, in Victoria Land. Visited by a New Zealand Antarctic Research Program geological party led by R.H. Findlay, 1979–80, they were named after Ken Brodie, a geologist with the party.
