= Williamson Glacier =

Glacier in Antarctica

- Map of Law Dome with Williamson Glacier towards center

- Location within Antarctica
- Location: Wilkes Land
- Coordinates: 66°40′00″S 114°06′00″E
- Thickness: unknown
- Terminus: Colvocoresses Bay
- Status: unknown

Williamson Glacier (66°40′S 114°6′E) is a glacier draining northeastward from Law Dome into Colvocoresses Bay. Delineated by Gardner Dean Blodgett (1955) from air photos taken by U.S. Navy Operation Highjump (1946–47). Named by Advisory Committee on Antarctic Names (US-ACAN) after John G. Williamson, crew member on the sloop Vincennes of the United States Exploring Expedition (1838–42) under Lieutenant Charles Wilkes.

== See also ==
- List of glaciers in the Antarctic
- Glaciology
