= Caudal Hills =

Group of hills in Antarctica

The Caudal Hills (73°10′S 161°50′E) are a group of hills situated within Victoria Land, Antarctica the hills lie between the Sequence Hills and the Lichen Hills on the western margin of upper Rennick Glacier. A series of spurs "tail" out to the north, hence the name "Caudal". They were so named by the northern party of New Zealand Geological Survey Antarctic Expedition, 1962–63. The Caudal Hills lies situated on the Pennell Coast, a portion of Antarctica lying between Cape Williams and Cape Adare.
