= Advisory Committee on Antarctic Names =

Advisory committee for the US geographic naming government agency

The Advisory Committee on Antarctic Names (ACAN or US-ACAN) is an advisory committee of the United States Board on Geographic Names responsible for recommending commemorative names for features in Antarctica.

== History ==
The committee was established in 1943 as the Special Committee on Antarctic Names (SCAN). It became the Advisory Committee on Antarctic Names in 1947. Fred G. Alberts was Secretary of the Committee from 1949 to 1980.

By 1959, a structured nomenclature was reached, allowing for further exploration, structured mapping of the region and a unique naming system. A 1990 ACAN gazeeter of Antarctica listed 16,000 names.

== Description ==
The United States does not recognise territorial boundaries within Antarctica, so ACAN assigns names to features anywhere within the continent, in consultation with other national nomenclature bodies where appropriate, as defined by the Antarctic Treaty System. The research and staff support for the ACAN is provided by the United States Geological Survey.

ACAN has a published policy on naming, based on priority of application, appropriateness, and the extent to which usage has become established. The United States Secretary of the Interior is in charge of formally appointing the members of the committee.

== Named places ==
- Abbot Ice Shelf, named after R. Admiral James Lloyd Abbot Jr., U. S. Commanding Officer
- Anderson Scarp, named after Kent Anderson
- Anthony Bluff, named after Captain Alexander Anthony, United States Air Force
- Ashworth Glacier, named after Allan C. Ashworth
- Banded Bluff, named for the bands of snow and rock on the bluff face
- Becker Point, named after Robert A. Becker
- Bennett Saddle, named after Gerard A. Bennett, traverse specialist
- Beyl Head, named after Commander David D. Beyl, U.S. Navy
- Bird Bluff, named after Commander Charles F. Bird
- Blessing Bluff, named after Commander George R. Blessing, U.S. Navy
- Brandau Glacier, named after James F. Brandau, U.S. Navy
- Brandau Rocks, named after James F. Brandau, U.S. Navy
- Brien Rocks, named after Robert J. Brien, aviation electronics technician
- Brookman Point, named after Lieutenant Peter J. Brookman
- Brown Peaks, named after Kenneth R. Brown, biologist
- Brown Scarp, named after Arthur J. Brown, Deputy Program Director (1982–90), ITT Antarctic Services, Inc.
- Bruner Hill, named after Lieutenant Michael G. Bruner, U.S. Navy
- Bucher Rim, named after Peter Bucher, glaciologist
- Buntley Bluff, named after Ensign Ronald E. Buntley
- Burnette Rock, named after Chief Warrant Officer Desmond Burnette, U.S. Army
- Burrage Dome, named after Roy E. Burrage, Jr., construction mechanic
- Butler Summit, named after Rhett Butler of Incorporated Research Institutions for Seismology (IRIS)
- Callender Peak, named after Lieutenant Gordon W. Callender
- Campbell Crag, named after Richard J. (Rick) Campbell
- Cantrell Peak, named after Major Robert L. Cantrell, United States Marine Corps
- Cape Cornely, named after Joseph R. Cornely, radio operator
- Cape Polar Sea, named after the USCGC Polar Sea
- Clark Knoll, named after Elton G. Clark, U.S. Navy
- Cleft Ledge, named for descriptive features
- Clingman Peak, named after Otis Clingman, Jr., biologist
- Coor Crags, named after Lieutenant Commander Lawrence W. Coor, U.S. Navy
- Cope Hill, named after Lieutenant Winston Cope
- Corbet Peak, named after Barry Corbet, member of the 1966–67 American Antarctic Mountaineering Expedition that made the first ascent of Mount Vinson
- Cosgrove Ice Shelf, named after Lieutenant Jerome R. Cosgrove, U.S. Navy Reserve, asst. communications Officer
- Cousins Rock, named after Michael D. Cousins, ionospheric physicist
- Crary Knoll, named after Albert P. Crary, scientist
- Creehan Cliff, named after Lieutenant E. Patrick Creehan
- Crosson Ice Shelf, named after Commander W.E. Crosson, U.S. Navy, Commanding Officer
- Curran Bluff, named after Martin P. Curran
- Davey Peak, named after Gary R. Davey, meteorologist
- Davis Knoll, named after Thomas C. Davis, Jr., geologist
- Davis Saddle, named after Clinton S. Davis, U.S. Navy
- DeMaster Point, named after Douglas P. DeMaster, biologist
- DeVries Bluff, named after Arthur L. DeVries, biologist, in conjunction with DeVries Glacier
- Dickinson Rocks, named after David N. Dickinson, construction mechanic
- Dickson Icefalls, named after Donald T. Dickson, glaciologist
- Dickson Pillar, named after Paul B. Dickson, photographer
- Dillon Peak, named after Raymond D. Dillon, biologist
- Dipboye Cirque, named after Richard L. Dipboye, helicopter pilot
- Dorrel Rock, named after Leo E. Dorrel, U.S. Navy
- Dotson Ice Shelf, named after Lieutenant William A. Dotson, U. S. Navy, Officer in Charge of the Ice Reconnaissance Unit of the Naval Oceanographic Office
- Douglas Gap, named after Donald S. Douglas, biologist
- Downs Cone, named after Bill S. Downs
- Draves Point, named after Dale Draves, U.S. Navy
- Dreary Isthmus, named for descriptive features
- Dudley Head, originally named Mount Dudley by Ernest Shackleton and later amended
- Durrance Inlet, Lieutenant Frank M. Durrance, Jr., U.S. Navy Reserve
- Ellis Cone, named after Homer L. Ellis, U.S. Navy
- England Ridge, named in conjunction with Mount England
- English Rock, named after Claude L. English, Jr.
- Eubanks Point, named after Staff Sergeant Leroy E. Eubanks
- Evans Knoll, named after Donald J. Evans
- Everett Spur, named after Kaye R. Everett, geologist
- Favela Rocks, named after Rafael Favela, Jr., U.S. Navy equipment operator
- Favreau Pillar, named after Robert D. Favreau
- Ferri Ridge, named after Guy Ferri
- Fields Peak, named after Master Sergeant Samuel J. Fields
- Fleming Head, named after John P. Fleming
- Folk Ridge, named after John E. Folk, biolab technician
- Fontaine Bluff, named after Lieutenant Commander R.K. Fontaine, U.S. Navy
- Foreman Peak, named after Donald L. Foreman, mechanic
- Fowler Knoll, named after Chief Warrant Officer George W. Fowler, U.S. Army
- Frost Cliff, named after William L. Frost, U.S. Navy
- Fry Peak, named after Frederick M. Fry, U.S. Navy Flight Surgeon
- Furman Bluffs, named after James L. Furman, U.S. Navy staff assistant
- Garwood Point, named after James W. Garwood, U.S. Navy metalsmith
- Gealy Spur, named after William J. Gealy
- Gerrish Peaks, named after Samuel D. Gerrish, ionospheric physics researcher
- Gibbon Nunatak, named after Thomas L. Gibbon
- Glover Cirque, named after Robert P. Glover, cartographer
- Good Glacier, named after Vice Adm. Roscoe F. Good, logistical support
- Grass Bluff, named after Robert D. Grass, meteorologist
- Gray Rock, named after Alvin M. Gray, radioscience researcher
- Greene Ridge, named after Charles R. Greene, Jr., ionospheric scientist
- Gregory Rock, named after Elmer D. Gregory, aviation maintenance line crew supervisor
- Grew Peak, named after Edward Grew
- Groux Rock, named after Roger G. Groux, U.S. Navy shipfitter
- Harrison Ice Ridge, named after William D. Harrison
- Harvey Peak, named after Paul Harvey, aviation support
- Hatch Outcrop, named after Ross Hatch, U.S. Navy
- Haver Peak, named after D.J. Haver, U.S. Navy
- Hawthorne Bluff, named after Ann Parks Hawthorne, photographer
- Hofman Hill, named after Robert J. Hofman, biologist
- Heathcock Peak, named after Joe Day Heathcock, U.S. Navy
- Helios Ridge, named in conjunction with Mount Helios
- Hill Peaks, named after Joseph Hill, Jr., mechanic and driver
- Jacobel Glacier, named after Robert W. Jacobel
- John Nunatak, named after Orlan F. John, American steelworker, U.S. Navy
- Johnson Bluff, named after Dwight L. Johnson, biologist
- Jones Ridge, originally named Cape Jones after Dr. Sydney Evan Jones and later reassigned
- Kamenev Nunatak, named after Yevgeniy N. Kamenev, Soviet geologist
- Kay Peak, named after Lieutenant Commander W. Kay
- Kellogg Valley, named after husband and wife glacial geologists Thomas B. Kellogg and Davida E. Kellogg
- Kelmelis Hills, named after John A. Kelmelis, cartographer
- Kemp Rock, named after William R. Kemp, U.S. Navy
- Kennedy Ridge, named after Nadene Kennedy, polar coordination specialist
- Kennel Peak, named after A. Alexander Kennel, ionospheric physicist
- Kerr Inlet, named in conjunction with Cape Kerr
- Kessler Peak, named after Captain Charles L. Kessler
- Kieffer Knoll, named after Hugh H. Kieffer, glaciologist
- Klinck Nunatak, named after Jay C. Klinck, U.S. Navy construction mechanic
- Koci Cliffs, named after Bruce R. Koci
- Kohler Head, named after John L. Kohler, U.S. Navy construction electrician
- Kolich Point, named afterThomas M. Kolich, geophysicist
- Koltermann Peak, named after Major David Koltermann
- Komhyr Ridge, named after Walter D. Komhyr, meteorologist
- Kooyman Peak, named after Gerald L. Kooyman, biologist
- Kristensen Rocks, named after Captain Leonard Kristensen
- LaForrest Rock, named after B.A. LaForrest
- Lake Discovery, named in conjunction with Discovery Glacier and Mount Discovery
- Lake Eggers, named after Alan J. Eggers
- Lasher Spur, named after Lieutenant William J. Lasher, U.S. Navy
- Lear Spire, named after D'Ann Figard Lear, librarian
- Leibert Cirque, named after Gregg Leibert, helicopter pilot
- Lemasters Bluff, named after Lieutenant Max E. Lemasters, U.S. Navy
- Lepley Nunatak, named after Larry K. Lepley, oceanographer
- Lie Cliff, named after Hans P. Lie, ionospheric physicist
- Lowry Bluff, named after George Lowry, biologist
- MacDonald Point, named after James H. MacDonald, journalist
- McCarthy Point, named after Lieutenant J.F. McCarthy, U.S. Navy
- MacMillan Point, named after Mark T. MacMillan, research assistant
- Mahalak Bluffs, named after Lieutenant Lawrence W. Mahalak, Jr., U.S. Navy
- Maish Nunatak, named after F. Michael Maish, ionospheric physicist
- Marinovic Beach, named after Baldo Marinovic
- Marsh Ridge, named after Robert D. Marsh, cook
- Matsumoto Pond, named after Genki I. Matsumoto, Japanese chemist
- Mayewski Peak, named after Paul A. Mayewski
- McIntosh Cliffs, named after William C. McIntosh
- McKnight Creek, named after Diane McKnight, research hydrologist
- Melcon Peak, named after Mark ("Commander") Melcon, carpenter
- Midkiff Rock, named after Frank T. Midkiff, Jr., aviation machinist's mate, U.S. Navy
- Milan Rock, named after Frederick T. Milan, aviation structural mechanic, U.S. Navy
- Miller Spur, named after Linwood T. Miller, sailmaker
- Mims Spur, named after Julius E. Mims, Jr., radio operator
- Mirfak Nunatak, named after the USNS Mirfak cargo vessel
- Mizar Nunataks, named after the USNS Mizar cargo vessel
- Mohaupt Point, named after H.E. Mohaupt, U.S. Navy
- Moran Bluff, named after Gerald F. Moran, U.S. Navy
- Morris Basin, named after Robert W. Morris, biologist
- Morse Nunataks, named after Oliver C. Morse III, ionospheric scientist
- Motherway Island, named after Paul T. Motherway
- Mount Dolber, named after Captain Sumner R. Dolber
- Mount Gaberlein, named after William E. Gaberlein, Chief Construction Electrician, U.S. Navy
- Mount Gester, named after Lieutenant Ronald L. Gester, seismologist/geomagnetist
- Mount Griffin, named after Chief Warrant Officer Joe R. Griffin, U.S. Army
- Mount Heg, named after James E. Heg, Chief of the Polar Planning and Coordination Staff in the Office of Polar Programs, National Science Foundation
- Mount Keinath, named after Gerald E. Keinath, biolab administrator
- Mount Knauff, named after Major General Robert A. Knauff, chief of staff of the New York Air National Guard
- Mount Manger, named after William Manger
- Mount Matthias, named after Jack Matthias, Lieutenant Commander Jack M. Matthias, United States Navy
- Mount Meunier, named after Tony Kenneth Meunier, cartographer and physical scientist
- Mount Montreuil, named after Paul L. Montreuil, biologist
- Mount Obiglio, named after Lieutenant G.M. Obiglio, Argentine naval observer
- Mount Otis, named afterJack Otis
- Mount Rath, named after Arthur E. Rath, electronics technician
- Mount Seitz, named after Thomas E. Seitz, Chief Construction Mechanic, U.S. Navy
- Mount Sinha, named after Akhouri Sinha
- Mount Slaughter, named after John Brooks Slaughter, director of the National Science Foundation
- Mount Stierer, named after Byron A. Stierer, Airman First Class, United States Air Force
- Mount Suggs, named after Henry E. Suggs, equipment operator
- Mount Sumner, named after Joseph W. Sumner
- Mount Wheat, named after Lieutenant Commander Luther William Wheat
- Mulligan Peak, named after John J. Mulligan
- Murray Pond, named after D.F.C. Murray, driller
- Musson Nunatak, named after John M. Musson
- Oeschger Bluff, named after Hans Oeschger, glaciologist
- Oliver Island, named after David L. Oliver, U.S. Navy cook
- Olson Peaks, named after Gary D. Olson
- Paine Ridge, named after Roland D. Paine
- Paz Cove, named after H.J. Paz
- Pentecost Cirque, named after John S. Pentecost, helicopter pilot
- Pine Island Glacier, named after Pine Island Bay
- Pinet Butte, named after Paul R. Pinet, geologist
- Poindexter Peak, named after Monte F. Poindexter, meteorologist
- Polar Subglacial Basin, named for geographical features
- Post Ridge, named after Madison J. Post, ionospheric physicist
- Powell Hill, named after James A. Powell, U.S. Navy
- Raymond Ice Ridge, named after Charles F. Raymond, Professor Emeritus at the University of Washington
- Redondo Point, originally named by Argentina in 1957
- Reid Ridge, named after John R. Reid, Jr., glaciologist
- Reilly Rocks, named after Gerald E. Reilly, Jr., USCG, machinery technician
- Renirie Rocks, named after Jack Renirie
- Reynolds Nunatak, named after Clifford E. Reynolds, electrician
- Reuning Glacier, named after Winifred M. Reuning, editor of the Antarctic Journal of the United States (1980-2015)
- Rice Ridge, named afterLieutenant Commander Robert A. Rice, U.S. Navy
- Rowe Bluff, named after Lieutenant Commander Gary L. Rowe
- Rust Bluff, named after Izak C. Rust, professor of geology
- Sayen Rocks, named after L.D. Sayen, photographer
- Scharon Bluff, named after LeRoy H. Scharon
- Sechrist Peak, named after Frank S. Sechrist
- Schroeder Hill, named after Henry B. Schroeder, meteorologist
- Sentry Rocks, named for geographic features
- Serlin Spur, named after Ronald C. Serlin, ionospheric physicist
- Sevier Nunatak, named after Lieutenant Commander Moses T Sevier, U.S. Navy
- Siren Rock, named after Jan C. Siren, radio scientist
- Slusher Nunatak, named after Harold E. Slusher, meteorologist
- Snyder Peak, named after David R. Snyder, aviation electronics technician
- Spilhaus Inlet, named after Athelstan Spilhaus, meteorologist and oceanographer
- Spillway Icefall, named for descriptive features
- Standifer Bluff, named after J.N. Standifer
- Stanton Hills, named after Lieutenant Commander Ronald A. Stanton, USN, command pilot of an LC-130 Hercules aircraft
- Stepping Stone Pond, named for location features
- Stuart Point, named after Frederick D. Stuart, captain's clerk
- Suggs Peak, named after James D. Suggs, geologist
- Teardrop Pond, named for descriptive features
- Temnikow Nunataks, named after Nicolas Temnikow, biologist
- Thwaites Glacier, named after Fredrik T. Thwaites
- Tighe Rock, named after Robert F. Tighe, electrical engineer
- Todd Hill, named after Ronald L. Todd, cartographer
- Trabucco Cliff, named after William J. Trabucco, ionospheric physicist
- Tucker Point, named after Robert L. Tucker, U.S. Navy meteorologist
- Tuning Nunatak, named after Preston O. Tuning, meteorologist
- Tur Peak, named after Lieutenant Juan J. Tur, U.S. Navy Reserve, medical officer
- Velie Nunatak, named after Edward C. Velie, meteorologist
- Venable Ice Shelf, named after Cdm. J.D. Venable, U.S. Navy, Ships Operations Officer
- Wahlstrom Peak, named after Richard W. Wahlstrom
- Walker Rocks, named after Carson B. Walker
- Virginia Valley, named after Ross A. Virginia, Environmental Studies Department, Dartmouth College
- Walts Cliff, named after Dennis S. Walts, meteorologist
- Watanuki Pond, named after Kunihiki Watanuki, Department of Chemistry, University of Tokyo
- Whitcomb Ridge, named after Jean P. Whitcomb, radio scientist
- Whited Inlet, named after Master Chief Quartermaster Robert J. Whited, U.S. Navy, Leading Chief
- Wiest Bluff, named after William G. Wiest, ionospheric scientist
- Williams Pond, named after M.W. (Max) Williams, driller
- Williamson Glacier Tongue, named after John G. Williamson
- Wold Nunatak, named after Richard J. Wold, geologist
- Wunneburger Rock, named after Henry E. Wunneburger, U.S. Navy, cook

== See also ==
- United States Board on Geographic Names
- Antarctic Treaty System
