= Hollingsworth =

Hollingsworth is a surname of English origin. Notable people with the surname include:

- Adam Hollingsworth (born 1969), US politician
- Al Hollingsworth (disambiguation), several people
- Alvin Hollingsworth (1928–2000), US painter
- Andrew Hollingsworth (born 1979), English cricketer
- Ben Hollingsworth (actor) (born 1984), Canadian actor
- Ben Hollingsworth (soccer) (born 1982), US soccer player
- Bonnie Hollingsworth (1895–1990), US baseball player
- Claudia Hollingsworth (born 2005), Australian athlete
- David Hollingsworth (1844–1929), US congressman
- Dean Hollingsworth (born 1961), Guernsey actor in Timelash and The Greatest Show in the Galaxy
- Dennis Hollingsworth (born 1967), US politician
- Don Hollingsworth (born 1932), Canadian football player
- Elaine Hollingsworth (1928–2022), US actress
- Ellery Hollingsworth (born 1991), snowboarder
- Frank Hollingsworth (1892–1964), justice of the Supreme Court of Missouri
- George Hollingsworth (1813–1882), US artist
- Henry Hollingsworth (rower) (born 1997), American rower
- J. Rogers Hollingsworth (1932–2019), American historian and sociologist
- James F. Hollingsworth (1918-2010), US Army Lieutenant general
- Joe E. Hollingsworth (1908–1975), US politician
- John D. Hollingsworth (1917–2000), textile machinery executive
- Jon Hollingsworth (1977–2006), English soldier
- Joy Hollingsworth (born 1984), American basketball player, coach and entrepreneur
- Katherine Hollingsworth (born 1960), American politician from Missouri
- Kent Hollingsworth (1929–1999), US writer and publisher of The Blood-Horse
- Kim Hollingsworth (born 1966), Australian stripper and police officer
- Kyle Hollingsworth (born 1968), US musician
- Mark Hollingsworth Jr. (born 1954), US bishop
- Matt Hollingsworth (born 1968), US artist
- Mellisa Hollingsworth (born 1980), Canadian athlete
- Mike Hollingsworth (animator) (fl. 2006), US animator and comedian
- Patricia Ann Hollingsworth (1939–2006), American nurse and First Lady of North Carolina
- Paul Hollingsworth, Canadian sports reporter
- Quanitra Hollingsworth (born 1988), American-Turkish female basketballer
- Romero Hollingsworth (born 1987), Dutch footballer
- Roy Hollingsworth (1933–2014), Trinidadian athlete
- Ruth Hollingsworth (1880–1945), British artist
- Shawn Hollingsworth (born 1961), American football player
- Simon Hollingsworth (born 1972), Australian athlete
- Stanley Hollingsworth (1924–2003), US composer
- Taylor Hollingsworth (born 1983), US musician
- Timothy Hollingsworth (born 1980), US chef
- Tony Hollingsworth (fl 1988), British impresario
- Valentine Hollingsworth (1632–1710), Irish-born early American settler
- William R. Hollingsworth Jr. (1910–1944), American painter

Notable people with a name including "Hollingsworth" include:

- Dudley Hollingsworth Bowen Jr. (born 1941), US judge
- Hollingsworth Morse (1910–1988), US film and TV director
- Anne Hollingsworth Wharton (1845–1928), US historian

== See also ==
- Baker-Devotie-Hollingsworth Block, Des Moines, Iowa
- Fort Hollingsworth-White House, Georgia
- Hollingsworth, Georgia, community in Banks County
- Hollingsworth Glacier, Antarctica
- Hollingsworth House, Indianapolis
- Lake Hollingsworth, Florida
- Hollingsworth Park (disambiguation)
- Mount Hollingsworth, Antarctica
- Bourne & Hollingsworth, UK department store
- Harlan and Hollingsworth, Delaware firm
  - Harlan and Hollingsworth Office Building
  - Harland and Hollingsworth Company
- Harrington–Hollingsworth experiment
- Hollingsworth v. Perry, legal case
- Hollingsworth v. Virginia, legal case
- Rex, Georgia, also known as Hollingsworth
- Hollingworth (disambiguation)
