= Flint Ridge =

- Location within Antarctica

Geography
- Continent: Antarctica
- Region: Victoria Land
- Range coordinates: 77°31′S 163°2′E

Flint Ridge (77°31′S 163°2′E) is a north-south trending ridge with a summit elevation of 995 metres (3,264 ft) in the Asgard Range of Victoria Land, Antarctica. Flint Ridge was named by US-ACAN for Lawrence A. Flint, manager of the USARP Berg Field Center at McMurdo Station in 1972. A standard USGS survey tablet stamped "Flint ET 1971-72" was fixed in a rock slab atop this ridge by the USGS Electronic Traverse, 1971-72.

== Location ==
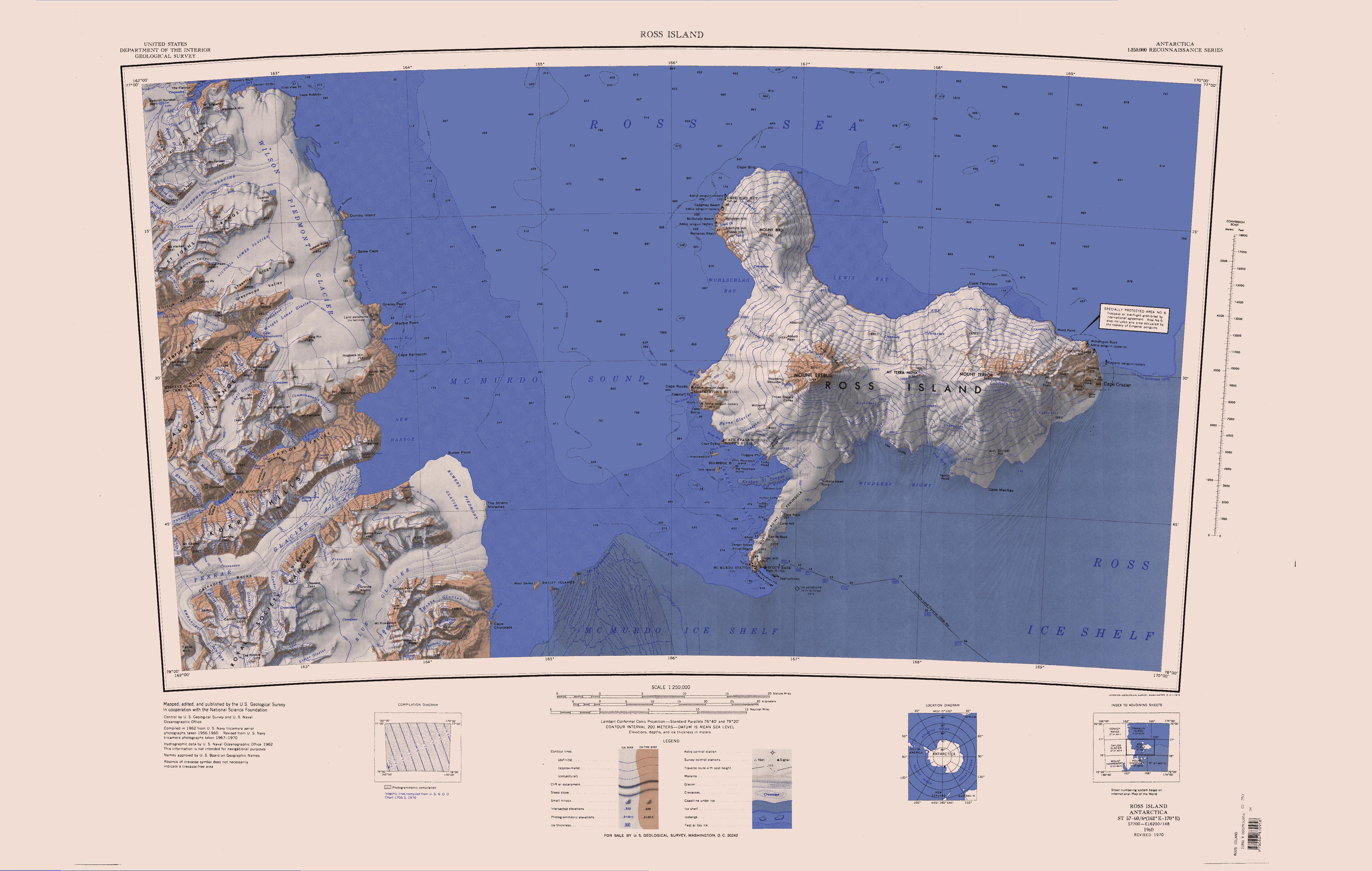
Flint Ridge in the east end of Asgard Range, south of center

Flint Ridge is immediately north of Commonwealth Glacier. Mount Coleman is to the east, Mount Falconer to the south and Mount McLennan to the west. To the northwest Loftus Glacier flows northeast into the Wilson Piedmont Glacier.

== Features ==
=== Sagittate Hill ===
77.510611°S 162.954645°E A hill with much exposed rock rising to 850 metres (2,790 ft) high at the west side of Flint Ridge. Named descriptively by Advisory Committee on Antarctic Names (US-ACAN) (1997) from the shape of the hill which is suggestive of an arrowhead, or the characteristic leaf form.

=== Noxon Cliff ===
77.528156°S 163.085353°E An E-W trending cliff at the south end of Flint Ridge. The cliff encloses the north flank of Commonwealth Glacier where it rises from 50 to 150 metres (160 to 490 ft) high above the glacier. Named by US-ACAN (1997) after John F. Noxon, who pioneered the technique of visible spectroscopy for measurements of stratospheric trace gases, particularly nitrogen dioxide. By 1975, he began making measurements of nitrogen dioxide column as a function of latitude, and was surprised to discover an abrupt decrease in the amounts in Arctic air as compared to values observed at lower latitudes. This unexpected phenomenon, width implications for later ozone depletion studies, became known as the "Noxon cliff". In 1978, Noxon sailed on RV Hero from Ushuaia, and quickly confirmed that a "cliff" in nitrogen dioxide is also found in the Antarctic atmosphere.

=== Dominion Hill ===
77.529981°S 163.153205°E A rounded rock summit rising to about 900 metres (3,000 ft) high in the east part of Noxon Cliff. Dominion Hill bounds the north edge of Commonwealth Glacier where it descends southeastward into Taylor Valley. Named by New Zealand Geographic Board (NZGB) (1998) after a form of government to complement the Commonwealth (of Australia) Glacier.

== Sources ==
- Alberts, Fred G., ed. (1995), Geographic Names of the Antarctic (PDF) (2 ed.), United States Board on Geographic Names This article incorporates public domain material from websites or documents of the United States Board on Geographic Names.
- "Dominion Hill", Geographic Names Information System, United States Geological Survey, United States Department of the Interior
- "Noxon Cliff", Geographic Names Information System, United States Geological Survey, United States Department of the Interior
- Ross Island, USGS: United States Geological Survey
- "Sagittate Hill", Geographic Names Information System, United States Geological Survey, United States Department of the Interior

This article incorporates public domain material from websites or documents of the United States Geological Survey.
