= Asgard Range =

Mountain range in Antarctica

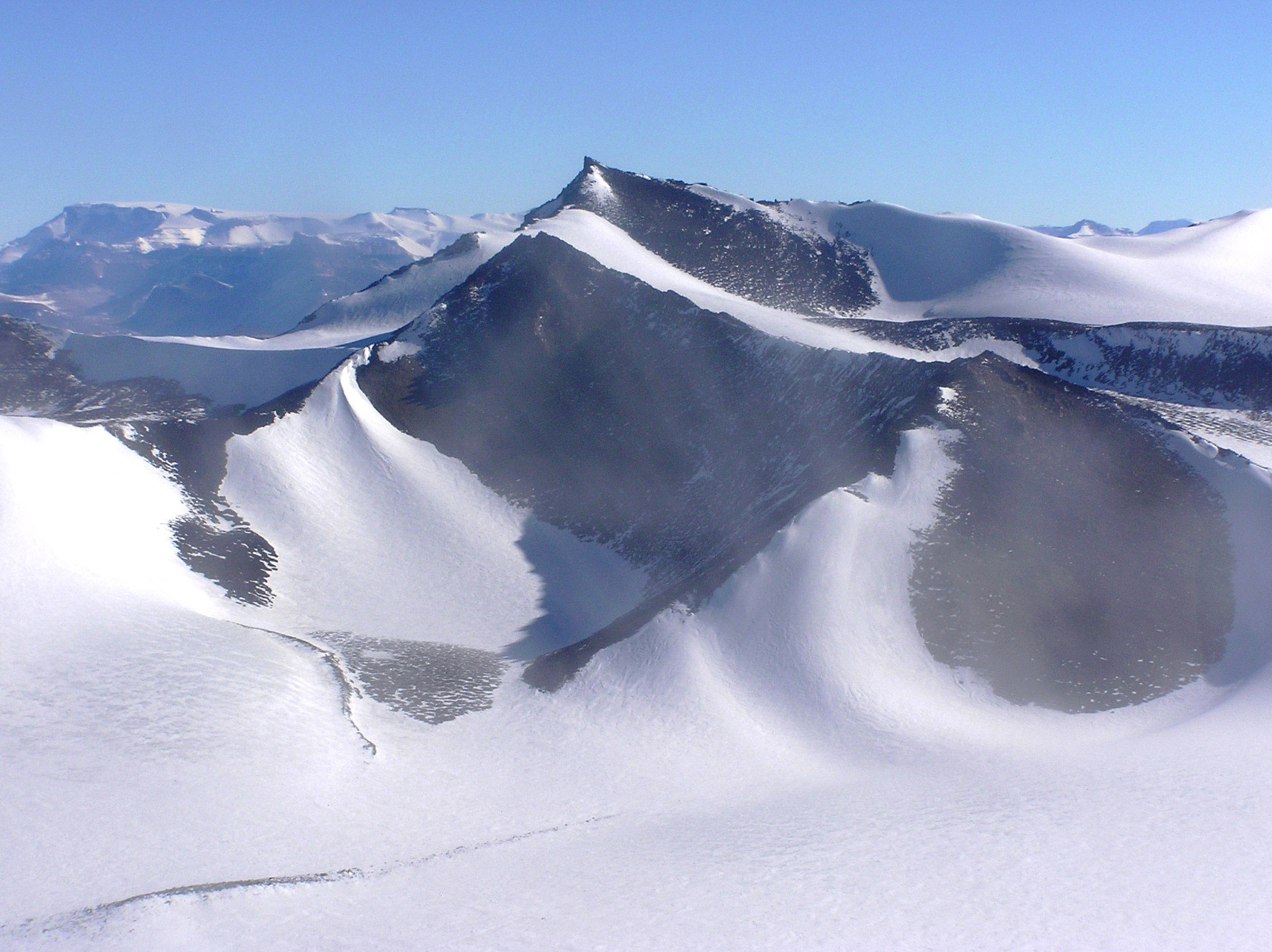
- Unspecified peak in the Asgard Range

Geography
- Location within Antarctica
- Continent: Antarctica
- Region: Victoria Land
- Range coordinates: 77°37′S 161°30′E

The Asgard Range (77°37′S 161°30′E) is a mountain range in Victoria Land, Antarctica. It divides Wright Valley from Taylor Glacier and Taylor Valley. It is south of the Olympus Range and north of the Quartermain Mountains and the Kukri Hills.

== Name ==
The Asgard Range was named by the Victoria University of Wellington Antarctic Expedition (1958–59) after Asgard, the home of the Norse gods.

== Location ==
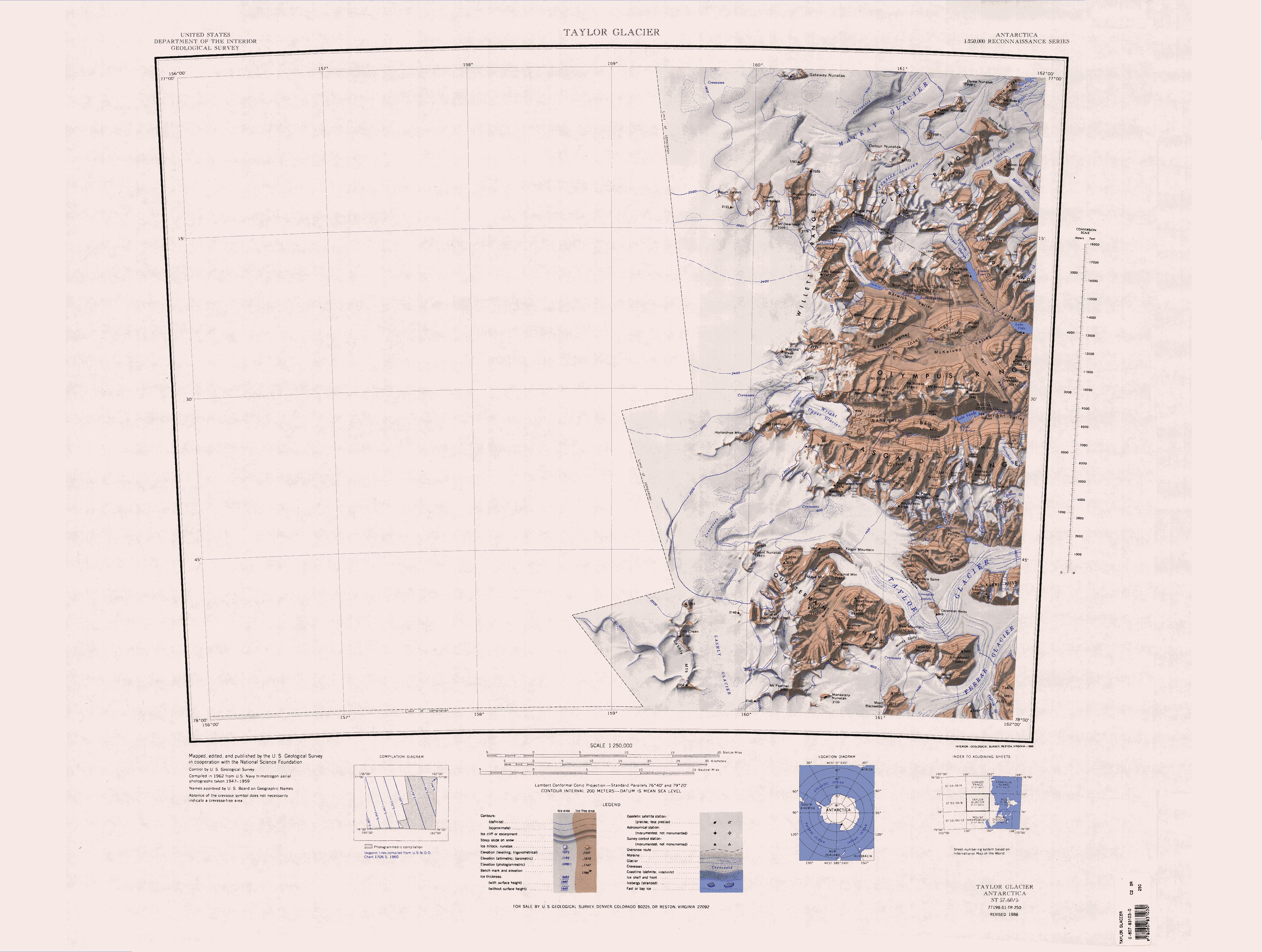
Asgard Range south of center of mapped region

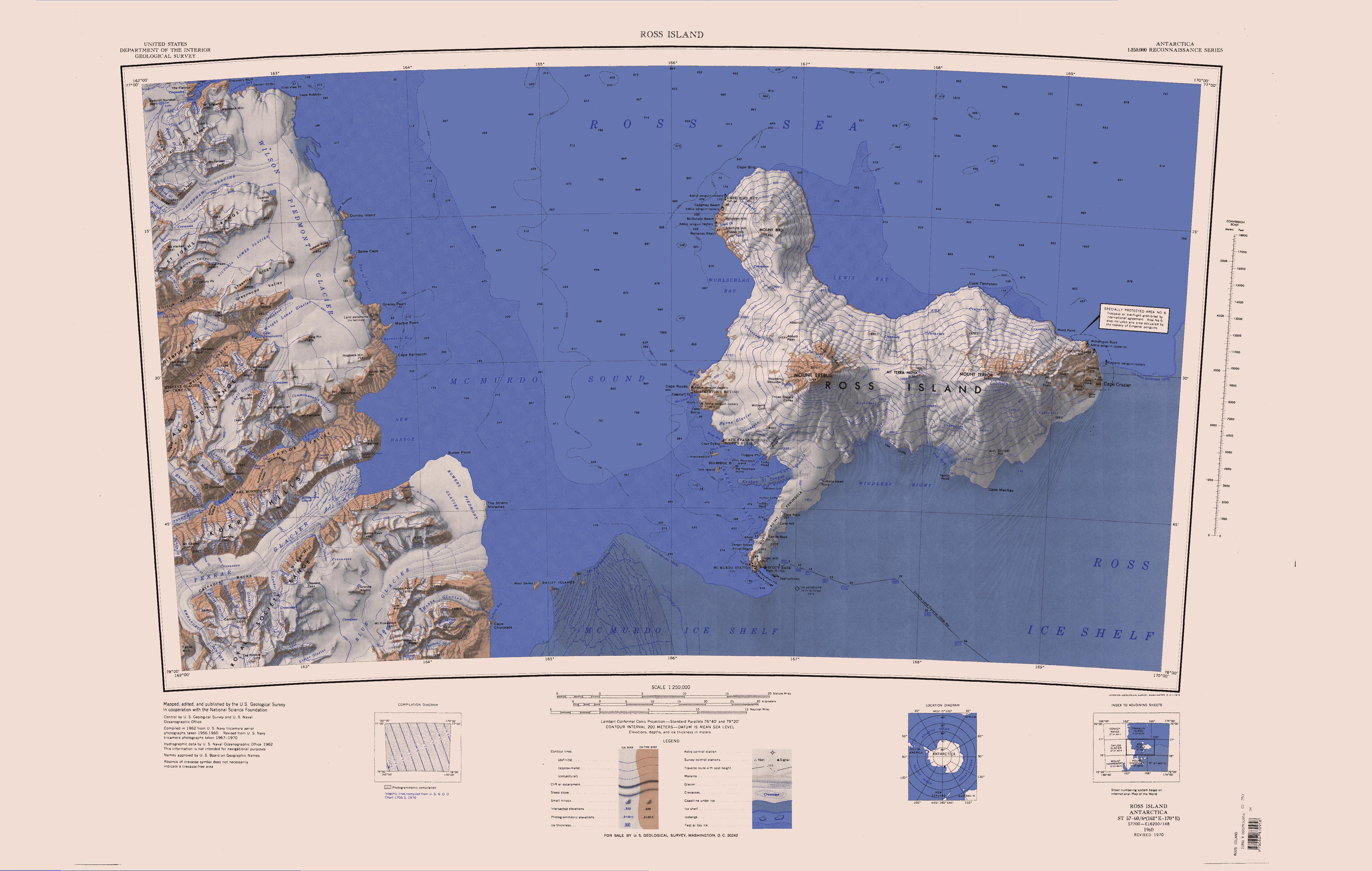
East end of Asgard Range left center

The Asgard Range extends in a west–east direction from Wright Upper Glacier, below the Antarctic Plateau, to Mount Newall above the Wilson Piedmont Glacier, which extends along the west coast of the Ross Sea. To the north, the Asgard Range is separated from the Olympus Range by the Wright Upper Glacier and the Wright Valley, from which the Wright Lower Glacier flows into the Wilson Piedmont Glacier. To the south, the Taylor Glacier and Taylor Valley separate the Asgard Range from the Quartermain Mountains and the Kukri Hills.

== Surrounding major glaciers and valleys ==
- Wright Upper Glacier is an ice apron at the upper west end of Wright Valley in the Asgard Range. It is formed by a glacier flowing east from the inland ice plateau.
- Wright Valley is a large east–west trending valley, formerly occupied by a glacier but now ice free except for Wright Upper Glacier at its head and Wright Lower Glacier at its mouth, in Victoria Land, Antarctica. It defines the north boundary of the Asgard Range.
- Taylor Glacier is a glacier in Antarctica about 35 nautical miles (65 km; 40 mi) long, flowing from the plateau of Victoria Land into the western end of Taylor Valley, north of the Kukri Hills. It flows to the south of the Asgard Range. The middle part of the glacier is bounded on the north by the Inland Forts.
- Taylor Valley is an ice-free valley about 18 nautical miles (33 km; 21 mi) long, once occupied by the receding Taylor Glacier. It lies north of the Kukri Hills between the Taylor Glacier and New Harbour. It defines the south boundary of the Asgard Range.
- Newall Glacier is a glacier in the east part of the Asgard Range. It flows east between Mount Newall and Mount Weyant into the Wilson Piedmont Glacier.
- Wilson Piedmont Glacier is a large piedmont glacier extending from Granite Harbour to Marble Point on the coast of Victoria Land.

== Major features ==
The Asgard Range contains numerous named features such as peaks, valleys, and glaciers, and even some sub-ranges. Many are named after Norse gods and mythological figures, in keeping with the name of the range itself. Major features, from west to east, include:

- The Inland Forts are a line of peaks extending between Northwest Mountain and Saint Pauls Mountain. They are at the west end of the Asgard Range.
- Pearse Valley is an ice-free valley 3 nautical miles (5.6 km; 3.5 mi) long, lying immediately west of Catspaw Glacier, at the south side of the Asgard Range.
- Mount Odin is the most prominent peak, though not the highest, in the Asgard Range. It rises over 2,000 m (6,600 ft) just south of Lake Vanda.
- Horowitz Ridge is a rock ridge between David Valley and King Valley.
- Roa Ridge is a bow-shaped ridge, 5 mi (8.0 km) long. For much of its extent, it separates Matterhorn Glacier and Lacroix Glacier.
- Mount Falconer is a mountain, 810 metres (2,660 ft) high, surmounting Lake Fryxell on the north wall of Taylor Valley, between Mount McLennan and Commonwealth Glacier in Antarctica.
- Mount Newall is a peak, 1,920 metres (6,300 ft) high, the northeast extremity of Asgard Range.
- Flint Ridge is a north-south trending ridge with a summit elevation of 995 metres (3,264 ft).
- MacDonald Hills is a compact group of exposed rock hills in the Asgard Range, east of Commonwealth Glacier on the north side of lower Taylor Valley.
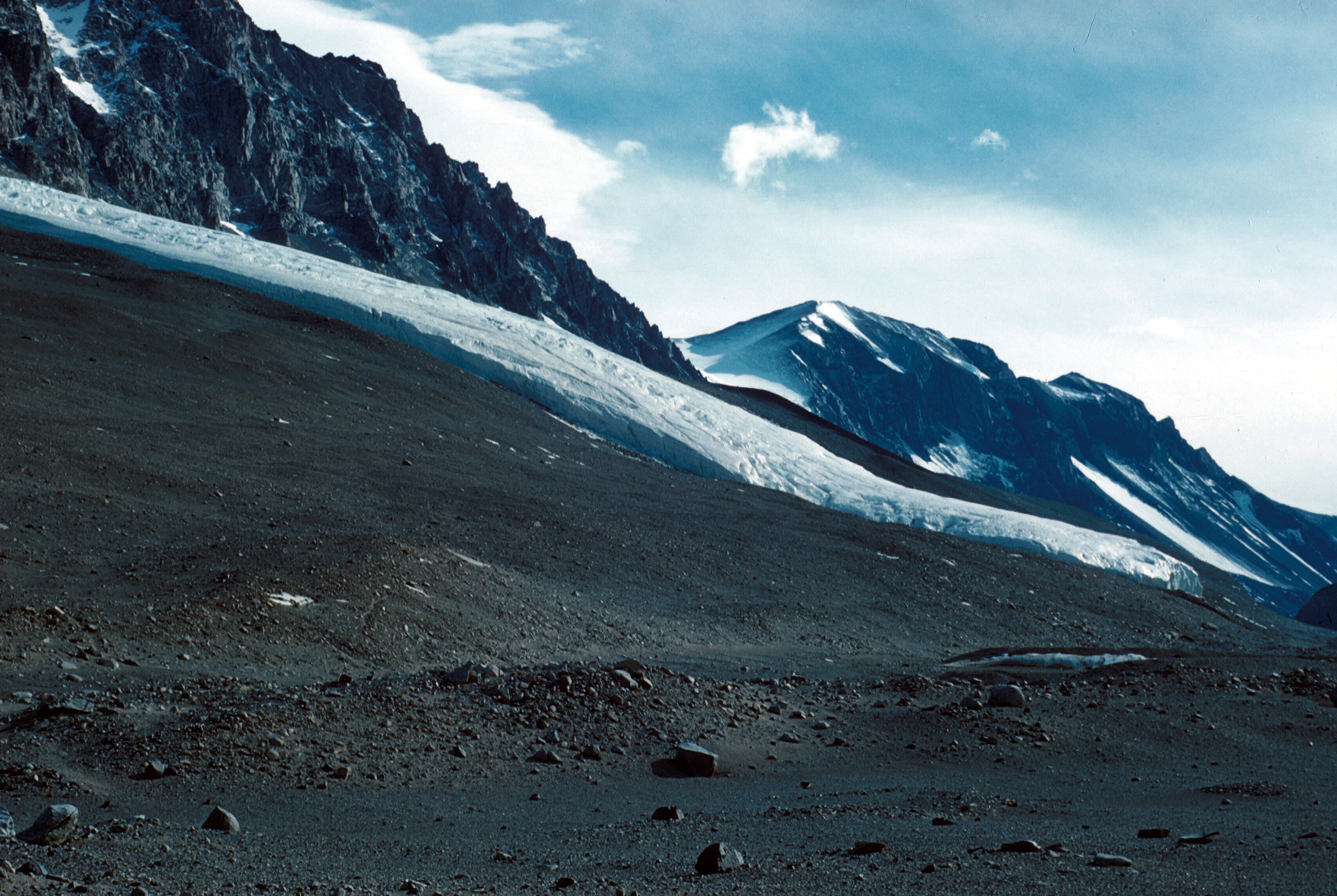
Lacroix Glacier in 1958

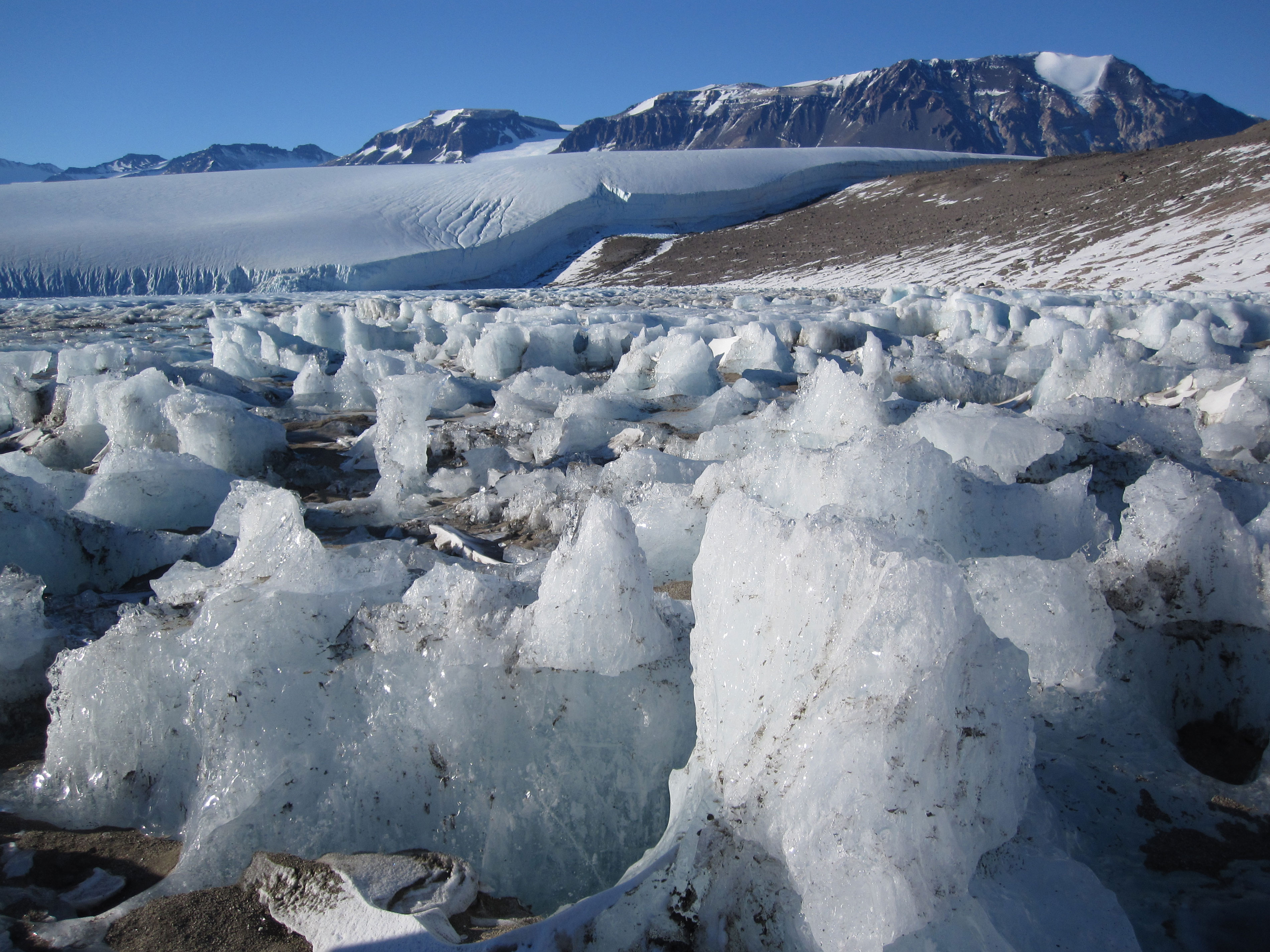
Lake Joyce

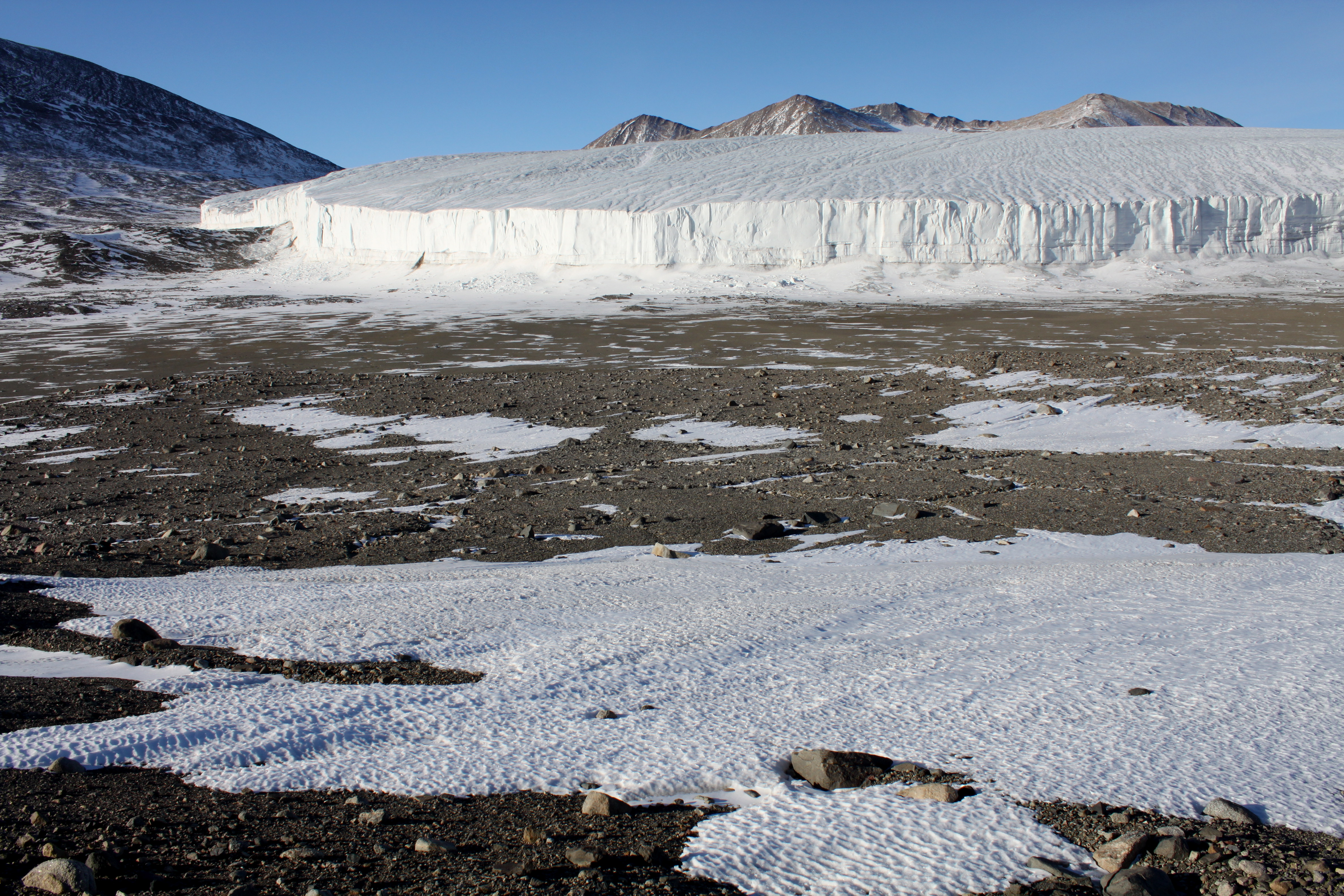
Commonwealth Glacier

== Sources ==
- Alberts, Fred G., ed. (1995), Geographic Names of the Antarctic (PDF) (2 ed.), United States Board on Geographic Names This article incorporates public domain material from websites or documents of the United States Board on Geographic Names.
- "MacDonald Hills", Geographic Names Information System, United States Geological Survey, United States Department of the Interior
- "Roa Ridge", Geographic Names Information System, United States Geological Survey, United States Department of the Interior
- Ross Island, USGS: United States Geological Survey
- Taylor Glacier, USGS: United States Geological Survey

This article incorporates public domain material from websites or documents of the United States Geological Survey.
