= Hollingworth (disambiguation) =

Hollingworth may refer to:

- Hollingworth (surname)
- Hollingworth, a village in Tameside, Greater Manchester
- Hollingworth Lake, Littleborough, Greater Manchester
- Hollingworth Reservoir near Hollingworth, Tameside

== See also ==
- Hollingsworth
