= Mount Park =

Mountain in Enderby Land, Antarctica

Mount Park (67°14′S 51°0′E) is a mountain 3 nautical miles (6 km) west of Mount Tomlinson in the northeast part of the Scott Mountains, Enderby Land. It was plotted from air photos taken from ANARE (Australian National Antarctic Research Expeditions) aircraft in 1956 and was named by the Antarctic Names Committee of Australia (ANCA) for J.A. Park, a member of the crew of the Discovery during the British Australian New Zealand Antarctic Research Expedition (BANZARE) of 1929–31.
