= Mount Charles =

Mount Charles may refer to any of the following:

- Mount Charles (Antarctica), in Enderby Land, Antarctica
- Mount Charles (New Zealand), the highest point on the Otago Peninsula
- Mount Charles, South Australia, the second highest peak in the Musgrave Ranges
