= Hollinworth =

Hollinworth is a surname. Notable people with the surname include:

- May Hollinworth (1895–1968), Australian theatre producer and director
- Richard Hollinworth (1607–1656), English clergyman

== See also ==
- Hollingworth (surname)
- Hollingsworth
