= Mount Tomlinson =

Mountain in Antarctica

Mount Tomlinson (67°15′S 51°11′E) is a mountain 2 nautical miles (3.7 km) south of Mount Marsland in the northeast part of the Scott Mountains, Enderby Land of Antarctica. It was plotted from air photos taken from ANARE (Australian National Antarctic Research Expeditions) aircraft in 1956 and was named by the Antarctic Names Committee of Australia (ANCA) for R.C. Tomlinson, a member of the crew of the Discovery during the British Australian New Zealand Antarctic Research Expedition (BANZARE) of 1929–31. Mount Thomlinson has an elevation of 2451m.
