= John Hollingworth =

John Hollingworth may refer to:

- John Hollingworth (politician) (1930–2018), British Conservative politician
- John Hollingworth (actor) (b. 1981), English actor
- John Hollingworth (priest) (1803–1856), Archdeacon of Huntington

== See also ==
- John Hollingsworth (1916–1963), a British orchestral conductor
- Hollingworth (surname)
