= Mount Charles (Antarctica) =

Mountain in Antarctica

Mount Charles (67°23′S 50°0′E) is a mountain, 1,110 m, standing 3 nautical miles (6 km) south of Mount Cronus in Enderby Land. Plotted from air photos taken by ANARE (Australian National Antarctic Research Expeditions) in 1956 and 1957. The chart drawn by John Biscoe (1830–31) shows four mountains in what is now named Scott Mountains; these four mountains were named Charles, Henry, Gordon and George, probably for the Enderby Brothers, owners of Biscoe's vessels. It has not been possible to identify the mountain so named by Biscoe, but in order to perpetuate the name Antarctic Names Committee of Australia (ANCA) applied it to this feature in 1962.
