= Mount Falconer =

Mountain in Antarctica

- Location within Antarctica

Geography
- Continent: Antarctica
- Region: Victoria Land
- Range coordinates: 77°35′S 163°8′E

Mount Falconer (77°35′S 163°8′E) is a mountain, 810 metres (2,660 ft) high, surmounting Lake Fryxell on the north wall of Taylor Valley, between Mount McLennan and Commonwealth Glacier in Antarctica. It was named by the Western Journey Party, led by Thomas Griffith Taylor, of the British Antarctic Expedition, 1910–13.

== Location ==
Mount Falconer is in the southeast of the Asgard Range. The Commonwealth Glacier forms to its north and flows east and then south into the Taylor Valley. Lake Fryxell in the Taylor Valley is to the south of the mountain, and Canada Glacier flows southeast into Taylor Valley to the west of Mount Falconer. Mount McLennan is to the northwest.

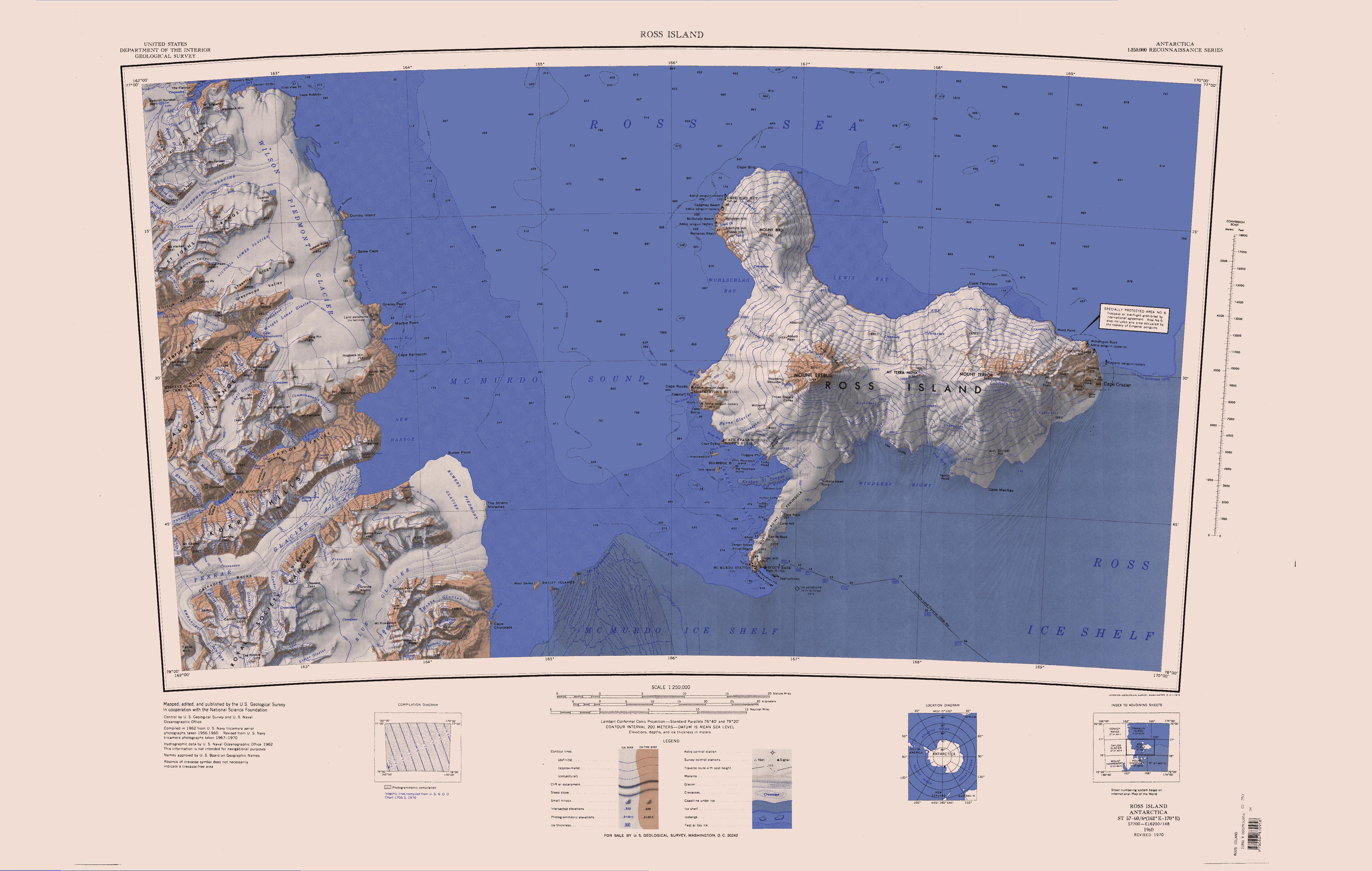
East end of Asgard Range south of center

== Features ==
Named features include, from west to east:

=== Perk Summit ===
77.579264°S 162.90596°E. A mountain peak, 1,750 metres (5,740 ft) high, that is the highest elevation on the ridge between Mount McLennan and Mount Keohane. Named by the United States Advisory Committee on Antarctic Names (US-ACAN) (1997) after Henry Perk, Chief Pilot, Kenn Borek Air, Ltd., Calgary, Canada, who has flown Twin Otter aircraft in the McMurdo Sound region and in many remote parts of the continent in direct support of the United States Antarctic Program from 1989.

=== Mount Keohane ===
77.591272°S 162.999739°E. A peak immediately northwest of Lake Fryxell, rising to 1,250 metres (4,100 ft) high between Canada Glacier and Huey Gully on the north side of Taylor Valley. Named in 1997 by US-ACAN after Petty Officer Patrick Keohane, R.N., of the British Antarctic Expedition (BrAE), 1910-13. Keohane was a member of Robert Falcon Scott's South Pole Journey Support Party that reached the Upper Glacier Depot on Beardmore Glacier before returning to headquarters on Cape Evans.

=== Huey Gully ===
77.581853°S 163.021879°E. A high, deeply incised gully between Mount Keohane and Mount Falconer in the north wall of Taylor Valley. Containing some glacial ice from Commonwealth Glacier, the gully provides meltwater to Huey Creek, which descends south to Lake Fryxell, Taylor Valley. Named by US-ACAN in 1997.

=== Scholars Peak ===
77.581053°S 163.083267°E. A peak rising to 750 metres (2,460 ft) high 0.5 miles (0.80 km) west of Mount Falconer. The peak stands at the southwest end of Tarn Valley and was named by New Zealand Geographic Board (NZGB) (1998) in association with the prominent universities for which nearby tarns are named.

=== Tarn Valley ===
77.572235°S 163.136612°E. An elevated ice-free valley, 1.5 nautical miles (2.8 km; 1.7 mi) long, containing four tarns named after American universities, Yale, Harvard, Princeton, and Penn (Pennsylvania), located at the north side of lower Taylor Valley, north of Mount Falconer. This valley was visited in the 1965-66 field season by Victoria University of Wellington Antarctic Expedition (VUWAE) (Edward D. Ghent, leader) which named the tarns. The valley was named in association with the tarns by Advisory Committee on Antarctic Names (US-ACAN) in 1997.

=== Princeton Tarn ===
77.57801°S 163.112136°E. A tarn at the northwest side of Mount Falconer and 0.1 nautical miles (0.19 km; 0.12 mi) south of Penn Tarn in the southwest part of Tarn Valley. The feature is one of four tarns in the valley named after American universities by the VUWAE 1965-66.

=== Penn Tarn ===
77.574219°S 163.119762°E. A tarn 0.1 nautical miles (0.19 km; 0.12 mi) north of Princeton Tarn in the southwest part of Tarn Valley. The feature is one of four tarns in the valley named by the VUWAE, 1965-66, after American universities. Penn is a colloquial form of reference to the University of Pennsylvania.

=== Harvard Tarn ===
77.570551°S 163.145837°E. A tarn 0.2 nautical miles (0.37 km; 0.23 mi) southwest of Yale Tarn in central Tarn Valley. The feature is one of four tarns in the valley named after American universities by the VUWAE, 1965-66.

=== Yale Tarn ===
77.570551°S 163.145837°E. A tarn 0.2 nautical miles (0.37 km; 0.23 mi) southwest of Yale Tarn in central Tarn Valley. The feature is one of four tarns in the valley named after American universities by the VUWAE, 1965-66.

=== Ghent Ridge ===
77.568861°S 163.121451°E. A ridge that parallels the south flank of Commonwealth Glacier, 0.5 nautical miles (0.93 km; 0.58 mi) north of Mount Falconer. The VUWAE 1965-66, called this feature "Smith Ridge," presumably after I. Smith, a member of the VUWAE field party, but that toponym is already in use for other features. It is therefore recommended that it not be approved and that this ridge be named after Edward D. Ghent, leader of the 1965-66 VUWAE, later with the Department of Geology, University of Calgary, Alberta, Canada.

=== Henderson Hill ===
77.572566°S 163.190709°E. An ice free summit 0.8 nautical miles (1.5 km; 0.92 mi) northeast of Mount Falconer, rising to 700 metres (2,300 ft) high on the north side of Taylor Valley. The name Henderson Hill appears in a 1968 report and geologic sketch map of the area prepared by the VUWAE, 1965-66, and is presumably named after Robert A. Henderson, a member of the VUWAE field party, later with the Museum of Comparative Zoology, Harvard University, Cambridge, Massachusetts.

== Sources ==
- Alberts, Fred G., ed. (1995), Geographic Names of the Antarctic (PDF) (2 ed.), United States Board on Geographic Names This article incorporates public domain material from websites or documents of the United States Board on Geographic Names.
- "Ghent Ridge", Geographic Names Information System, United States Geological Survey, United States Department of the Interior
- "Harvard Tarn", Geographic Names Information System, United States Geological Survey, United States Department of the Interior
- "Henderson Hill", Geographic Names Information System, United States Geological Survey, United States Department of the Interior
- "Huey Gully", Geographic Names Information System, United States Geological Survey, United States Department of the Interior
- "Mount Keohane", Geographic Names Information System, United States Geological Survey, United States Department of the Interior
- "Penn Tarn", Geographic Names Information System, United States Geological Survey, United States Department of the Interior
- "Perk Summit", Geographic Names Information System, United States Geological Survey, United States Department of the Interior
- "Princeton Tarn", Geographic Names Information System, United States Geological Survey, United States Department of the Interior
- "Scholars Peak", Geographic Names Information System, United States Geological Survey, United States Department of the Interior
- "Tarn Valley", Geographic Names Information System, United States Geological Survey, United States Department of the Interior
- "Yale Tarn", Geographic Names Information System, United States Geological Survey, United States Department of the Interior
- Ross Island, USGS: United States Geological Survey

This article incorporates public domain material from websites or documents of the United States Geological Survey.
