= Mount Weller =

Mountain in Enderby Land, Antarctica

Mount Weller (67°17′S 50°40′E) is a mountain, 1,080 m, standing west of Auster Glacier and 2 nautical miles (3.7 km) east of Reference Peak in Enderby Land. It was plotted from air photos taken by ANARE (Australian National Antarctic Research Expeditions) in 1956 and was named by the Antarctic Names Committee of Australia (ANCA) for G.E. Weller, a meteorologist at Mawson Station in 1961.
