= Pearse Valley =

Valley in Antarctica

Wright Valley
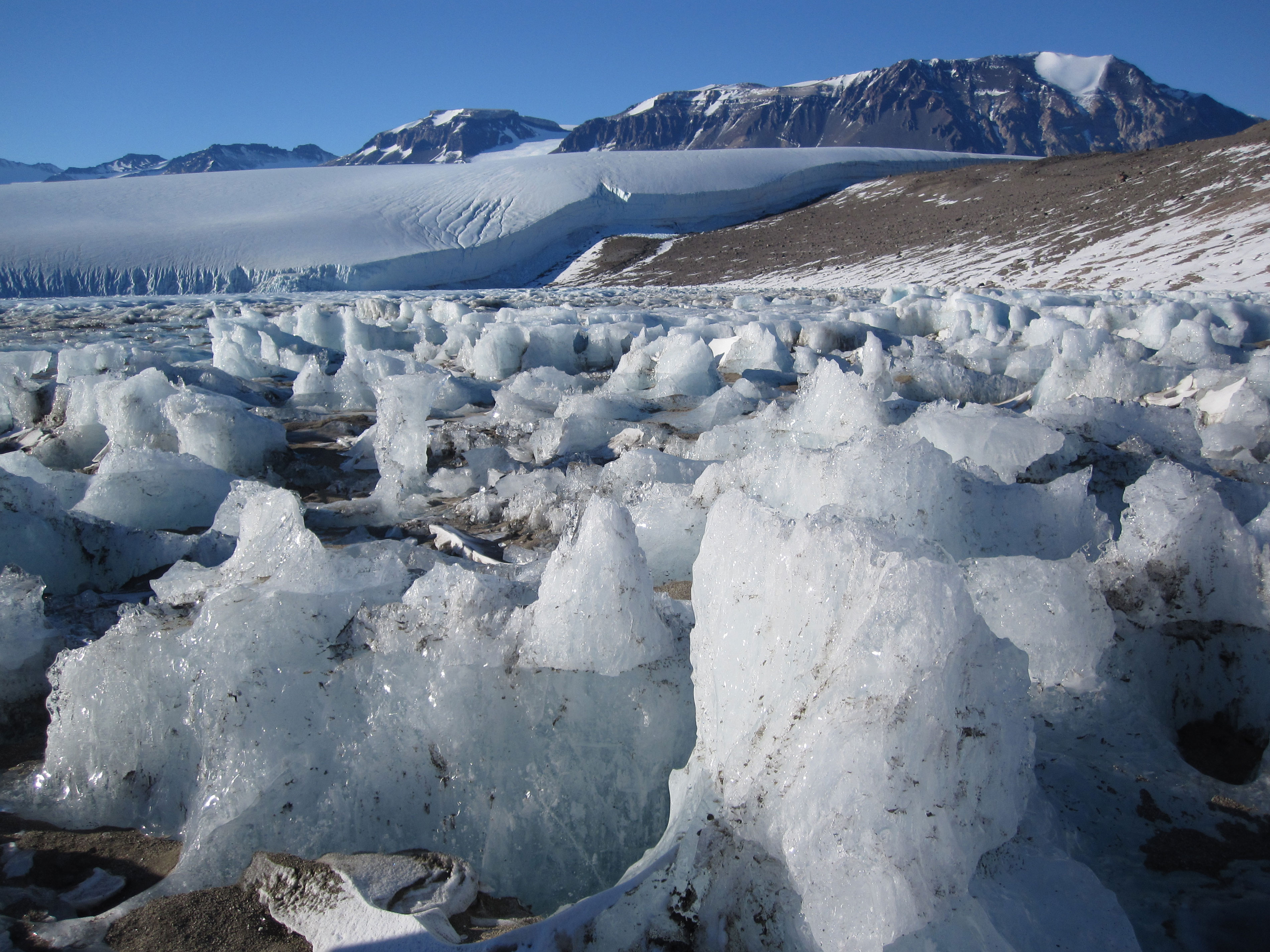
- Lake Joyce is ice covered all year around, and the icy surface is constantly reshaped by wind, freezing and thawing.

- Location within Antarctica

Geography
- Location: Antarctica
- Coordinates: 77°43′S 161°32′E
- Rivers: [
- Interactive map of Wright Valley

Pearse Valley (77°43′S 161°32′E) is an ice-free valley 3 nautical miles (5.6 km; 3.5 mi) long, lying immediately west of Catspaw Glacier, at the south side of the Asgard Range in Victoria Land, Antarctica. It was named by the United States Advisory Committee on Antarctic Names (US-ACAN) for John S. Pearse, biologist at McMurdo Station, 1961, and the season 1961–62.

== Location ==
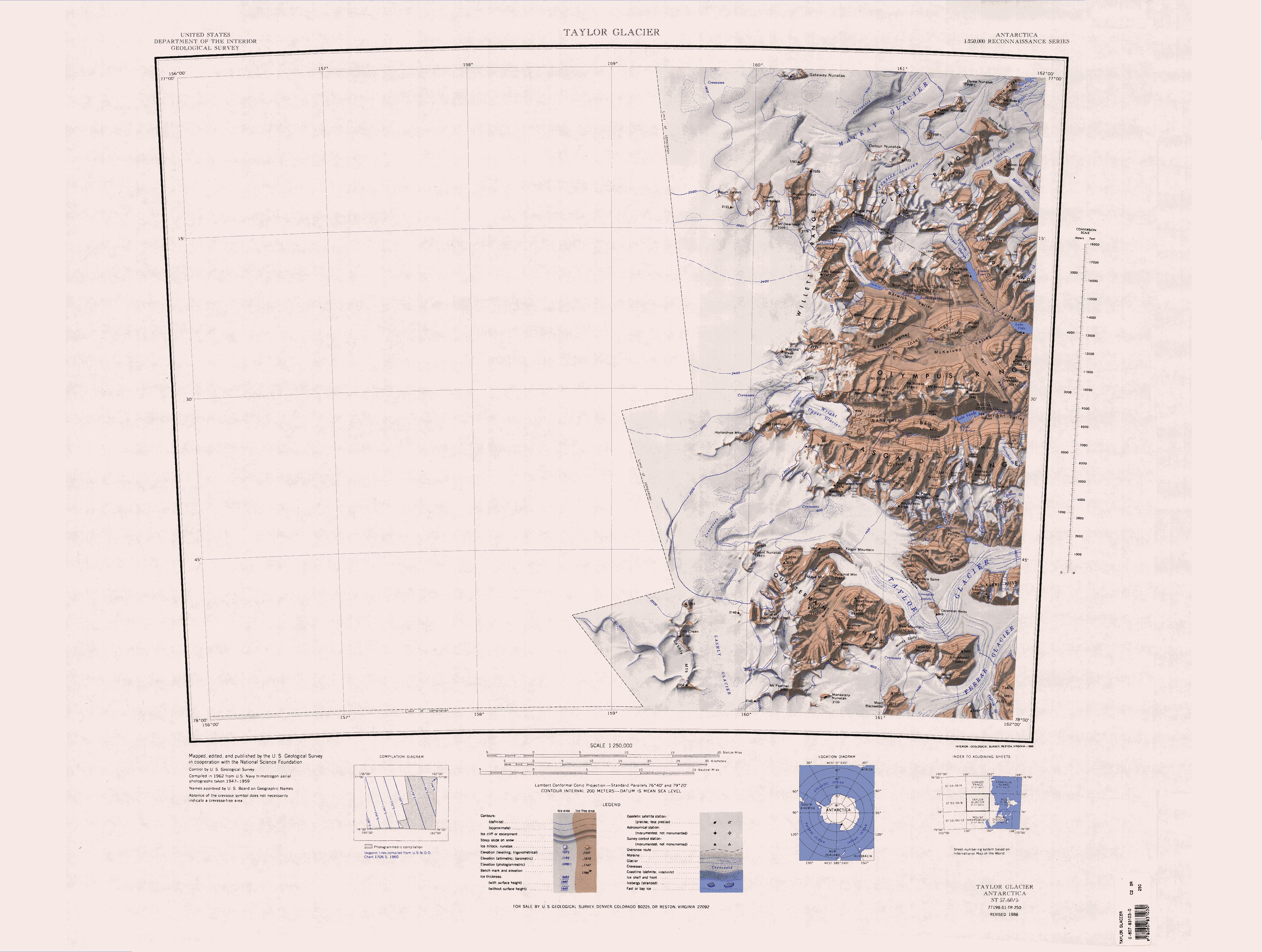
Asgard Range south of center of mapped region. Pearse Valley towards southeast.

Pearse Valley is one of the McMurdo Dry Valleys. It is in the south of the Asgard Range, opening onto Lake Joyce on the north side of the Taylor Glacier. The Friis Hills are to the south. Round Mountain is to the northwest.

== Features ==
Features in or around the valley include the Schlatter Glacier, Lake House, Lake Joyce and Catspaw Glacier.

=== Schlatter Glacier ===
77°41′S 161°27′E. Glacier descending from the Asgard Range toward Lake House in Pearse Valley. Named by the Advisory Committee on Antarctic Names (US-ACAN) for Roberto P. Schlatter, Chilean biologist who worked in the United States ArmyRP birdbanding program relative to the Adelie penguin and the south polar skua, at Cape Crazier in the 1969-70 and 1970-71 seasons.

=== Nylen Glacier ===
77.688048°S 161.496802°E. A narrow glacier between Schlatter Glacier and Fountain Glacier. It flows south into Pearse Valley. Named by the US-ACAN (2004) after Thomas H. Nylen, United States Antarctic Project (USAP) geologist from the Department of Geology at Portland State University in Portland, Oregon who studied glaciers in the Taylor Valley area, 1999-2003.

=== Fountain Glacier ===
77.690865°S 161.639985°E. A glacier between Nylen Glacier and Catspaw Glacier. It flows south into Pearse Valley. Named by US-ACAN (2004) after Andrew G. Fountain, Department of Geology, Portland State University, Portland, Oregon; USAP investigator in glacier mass balance studies of McMurdo Dry Valleys, 1993-2003.

=== Lake House ===
77°42′S 161°24′E. A lake in the extreme west end of Pearse Valley, north of Friis Hills in Victoria Land. Named by the eighth Victoria University of Wellington Antarctic Expedition (VUWAE), 1963-64, for D.A. House, chemist and member of the VUWAE party that explored lakes in the Taylor, Wright, and Victoria Valleys.

=== Lake Joyce ===
77°43′S 161°37′E. A lake which lies along the northern side of Taylor Glacier in Pearse Valley. It is 0.5 nautical miles (0.93 km; 0.58 mi) long, 140 feet (43 m) deep and is covered by 22 feet (6.7 m) of very clear ice. The lake was studied by the New Zealand VUWAE (1963-64) which named it after Ernest Joyce, a member of earlier British expeditions to the area led by Scott (1901-04) and Shackleton (1907-09).

== Sources ==
- Alberts, Fred G., ed. (1995), Geographic Names of the Antarctic (PDF) (2 ed.), United States Board on Geographic Names This article incorporates public domain material from websites or documents of the United States Board on Geographic Names.
- "Fountain Glacier", Geographic Names Information System, United States Geological Survey, United States Department of the Interior
- "Nylen Glacier", Geographic Names Information System, United States Geological Survey, United States Department of the Interior
- Taylor Glacier, USGS: United States Geological Survey

This article incorporates public domain material from websites or documents of the United States Geological Survey.
