= Mount Newall =

Mountain in Ross Dependency, Antarctica

- Location within Antarctica

Geography
- Continent: Antarctica
- Region: Victoria Land
- Range coordinates: 77°30′S 162°42′E

Mount Newall (77°30′S 162°42′E) is a peak, 1,920 metres (6,300 ft) high, the northeast extremity of Asgard Range, in Victoria Land, Antarctica. It was discovered by the Discovery Expedition (1901–04) and named for one of the men who helped raise funds to send a relief ship for the expedition.

== Location ==
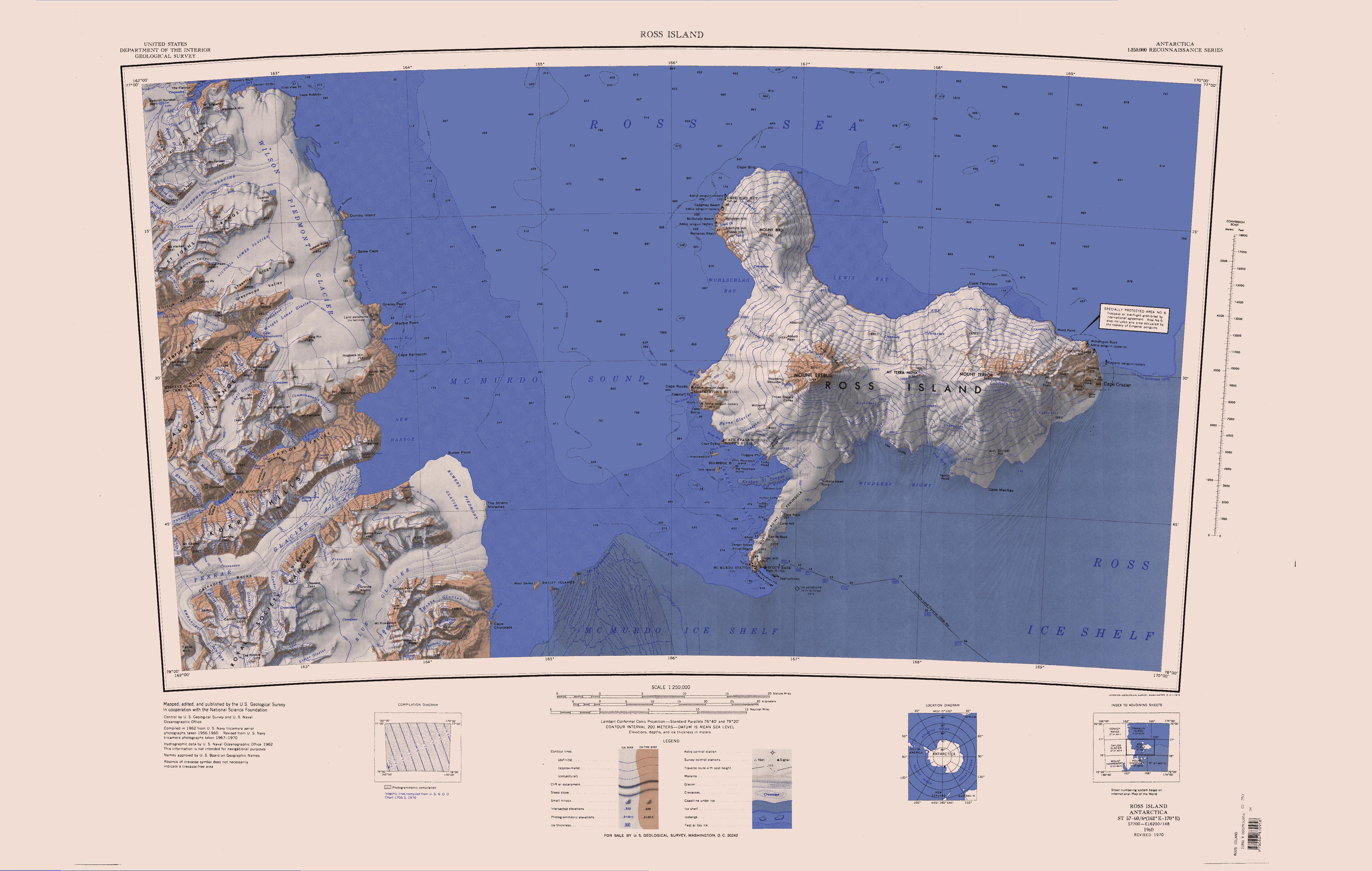
Mount Newall in the east end of Asgard Range, south of center

Mount Newall is in the northeast of the Asgard Range. It rises over the Newall Glacier to its south, which flows northeast into the Wilson Piedmont Glacier to the east of the mountain. Mount Loke and the eastern end of the Wright Valley are to the northwest of the mountain. The Denton Glacier, Goodspeed Glacier and Hart Glacier descend into the Wright Valley from the ridge that extends southwest from the mountain.

== Features ==
Named features in the region around Mount Newall include:

=== Mount Loke ===
77°29′S 162°33′E. A horn shaped peak on the south wall of Wright Valley, standing between Goodspeed and Denton Glaciers. Named by the VUWAE, 1958-59, after one of the Norse gods.

=== Decker Glacier ===
77°28′S 162°47′E. A steep, narrow glacier that drains the northeast slopes of Mount Newall. Named by US-ACAN for Chief Aviation Machinist's Mate William D. Decker, United States Navy, of Squadron VXE-6, who died at McMurdo Station on October 11, 1971.

=== Gallagher Ridge ===
77.465536°S 162.825091°E A ridge that trends northeast from Mount Newall, and descends to lower Wright Valley to the east of Decker Glacier. Named by Advisory Committee on Antarctic Names (US-ACAN) (1997) after Charles Gallagher, Command Master Chief, United States Naval Support Force, Antarctica, who served four austral summers at McMurdo Station, 1991-92 through 1994-95. Upon Navy retirement, Gallagher joined Antarctic Support Associates (ASA) as Housing Coordinator at McMurdo Station, 1995-96 and 1996-97. He became ill during the winter-over period and died at McMurdo Station, May 1, 1997.

=== Ferguson Glacier ===
77.464594°S 162.85564°E}. A glacier on the east side of Gallagher Ridge. It flows north parallel to Decker Glacier, the two glaciers merging before reaching the snout of Wright Lower Glacier. In association with Tractor Corner nearby, named by New Zealand Geographic Board (NZGB) (1998) to recall the passage of Massey Ferguson tractors over the Wright Lower Glacier enroute to Wright Valley in 1967.

=== Mount Feola ===
77.50667°S 162.612486°E A mountain rising to 1,800 metres (5,900 ft) high at the head of Denton Glacier. The feature is 1.3 nautical miles (2.4 km; 1.5 mi) west-southwest of Mount Newell. Named by US-ACAN (1997) for Samuel D. Feola, helicopter pilot, United States Navy Squadron VXE-6, principally flying in the McMurdo Dry Valleys, 1976 and 1977; from 1990 to the time of naming, Director Logistics, Antarctic Support Associates (ASA), responsible for contractor planning, management, and operations of logistic and operational support requirements for NSF's United States Antarctic Program.

=== Nichols Ridge ===
77.460954°S 162.760323°E A rock ridge between Denton Glacier and Decker Glacier. The feature descends from heights north of Mount Newall to the snout of Wright Lower Glacier at the east end of Wright Valley. Named by US-ACAN (1997) after Robert L. Nichols (Nichols Snowfield), one of the first American scientists to do geologic research in Wright Valley. In 1958, he found pecten deposits near the middle of the valley that greatly heightened research to determine the origin of the deposits and the glacial history of Wright Valley. This ridge is in proximity to Meserve, Hart, Goodspeed, and Denton Glaciers, named after four young geologists who worked in this area under Nichols in the 1958-59 field season.

=== Ponder Peak ===
77.48756°S 162.78487°E A peak rising to 1,412 metres (4,633 ft) high at the head of the Repeater Glacier. Named by New Zealand Geographic Board (NZGB) (1998) after W. Frank Ponder, architect who designed Scott Base for occupation in the 1957 International Geophysical Year and for the Commonwealth Trans-Antarctic Expedition.

=== Tractor Corner ===
77.464976°S 162.935435°E An inland rock point (the extremity of a spur) located 1.5 nautical miles (2.8 km; 1.7 mi) northeast of Repeater Glacier. The spur marks the northeastern extremity of the Mount Newall massif near the snout of Wright Lower Glacier. So named by NZGB (1998) from the passage of tractors over Wright Lower Glacier enroute to Wright Valley in 1967.

=== Mount Jord ===
77.510992°S 162.443872°E. A peak, 1,400 metres (4,600 ft) high, located northwest of Hetha Peak on the ridge between Hart Glacier and Goodspeed Glacier}. In association with names from Norse mythology grouped in this range, named by the NZGB (1998) after a mythological Norse earth goddess.

=== Mount Ulla ===
77°32′S 162°24′E. A sharp peak between Meserve Glacier and Hart Glacier. The summit is a knife-edge ridge which drops away on both sides. Named by the VUWAE, 1958-59, after one of the Norse gods.

=== Mount Valkyrie ===
77°33′S 162°19′E. A dolerite capped peak on the south wall of Wright Valley, separating Bartley Glacier and Meserve Glacier. Named by the VUWAE, 1958-59, after the Valkyries of Norse mythology.

== Sources ==
- Alberts, Fred G., ed. (1995), Geographic Names of the Antarctic (PDF) (2 ed.), United States Board on Geographic Names This article incorporates public domain material from websites or documents of the United States Board on Geographic Names.
- "Ferguson Glacier", Geographic Names Information System, United States Geological Survey, United States Department of the Interior
- "Gallagher Ridge", Geographic Names Information System, United States Geological Survey, United States Department of the Interior
- "Mount Feola", Geographic Names Information System, United States Geological Survey, United States Department of the Interior
- "Mount Jord", Geographic Names Information System, United States Geological Survey, United States Department of the Interior
- "Nichols Ridge", Geographic Names Information System, United States Geological Survey, United States Department of the Interior
- "Ponder Peak", Geographic Names Information System, United States Geological Survey, United States Department of the Interior
- Ross Island, USGS: United States Geological Survey
- "Tractor Corner", Geographic Names Information System, United States Geological Survey, United States Department of the Interior

This article incorporates public domain material from websites or documents of the United States Geological Survey.
