= Francis Peaks =

Group of mountains in Antarctica

The Francis Peaks (67°39′S 50°25′E) are a group of peaks and ridges 1 nautical mile (2 km) southeast of Mount Gordon in the Scott Mountains of Enderby Land, Antarctica.

They were plotted from air photos taken from Australian National Antarctic Research Expeditions aircraft in 1956, and were named by the Antarctic Names Committee of Australia for R.J. Francis, a physicist at Mawson Station in 1961.
