= Mount McLennan =

Mountain in Enderby Land, Antarctica

Coordinates: 67°12′S 51°5′E

Mount McLennan is a mountain 4 nautical miles (7 km) south of the Howard Hills in the northeast part of the Scott Mountains, Enderby Land, Antarctica. It was plotted from air photos taken from Australian National Antarctic Research Expeditions aircraft in 1956 and was named by the Antarctic Names Committee of Australia for K. McLennan, a member of the crew of the Discovery during the British Australian New Zealand Antarctic Research Expedition of 1929–31.
