= Reference Peak =

Peak in Antarctica

Reference Peak (67°15′S 50°29′E) is a roughly conical peak, 1,030 m, with a steep face to the west near its crest, lying 3 nautical miles (6 km) south of Amundsen Bay between Mounts Weller and Hollingsworth. Viewed from the north, it presents a sharp peak with smooth, clear-cut sides. It was sighted in October 1956 by an ANARE (Australian National Antarctic Research Expeditions) party and was so named because the peak was used as a reference point for magnetic observations at Observation Island.
