= Lake Joyce =

Lake in Antarctica

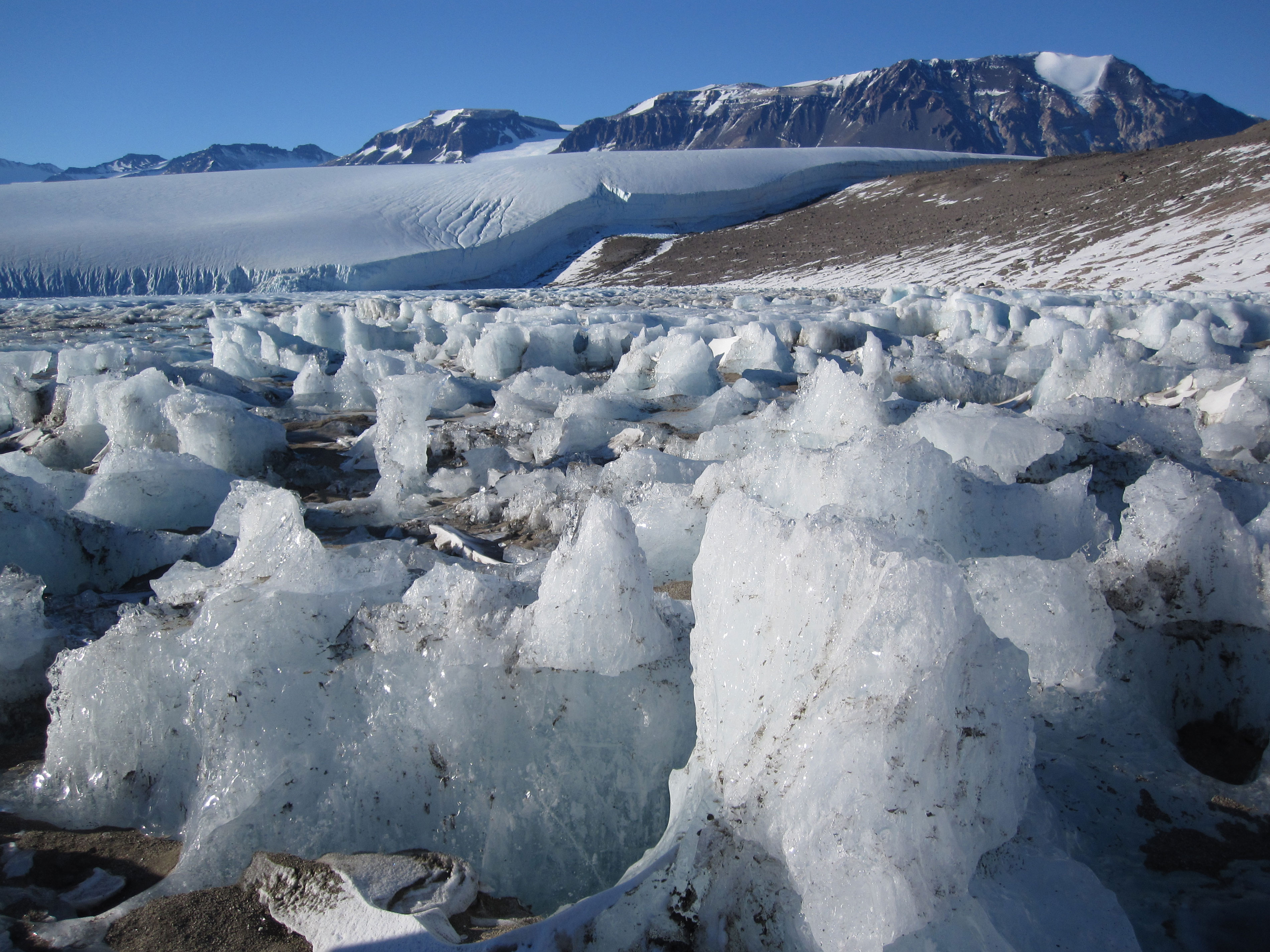
The lake is ice covered all year around, and the icy surface is constantly reshaped by wind, freezing and thawing.

Lake Joyce (77°43′S 161°38′E) is a lake which lies along the northern side of Taylor Glacier in Pearse Valley, Victoria Land, Antarctica. It is 0.5 nautical miles (1 km)) long, 140 feet (40 m) deep and is covered by 22 feet (7 m) of very clear ice. The lake was studied by the New Zealand Victoria University of Wellington Antarctic Expedition (1963–64) which named it after Ernest Joyce, a member of earlier British expeditions to the area led by Scott (1901–04) and Shackleton (1907–09).

The lake bottom is covered by thick microbial mats, from which rise microbialite carbonate structures.
