= MacDonald Hills =

Hills in Antarctica

- Location within Antarctica

Highest point
- Elevation: 277 m (909 ft)

Geography
- Continent: Antarctica
- Region: Victoria Land
- Range coordinates: 77°33′S 163°21′E

The MacDonald Hills (77°33′S 163°21′E) are a compact group of exposed rock hills in the Asgard Range, east of Commonwealth Glacier on the north side of lower Taylor Valley, Victoria Land, Antarctica. The hills were named by the Advisory Committee on Antarctic Names (US-ACAN) (1997) after William R. MacDonald (1925–77), Chief of the Branch of International Activities, U.S. Geological Survey, and a member of the US-ACAN, part of the U.S. Board on Geographic Names, 1976–77 (see MacDonald Peak).

== Named features ==
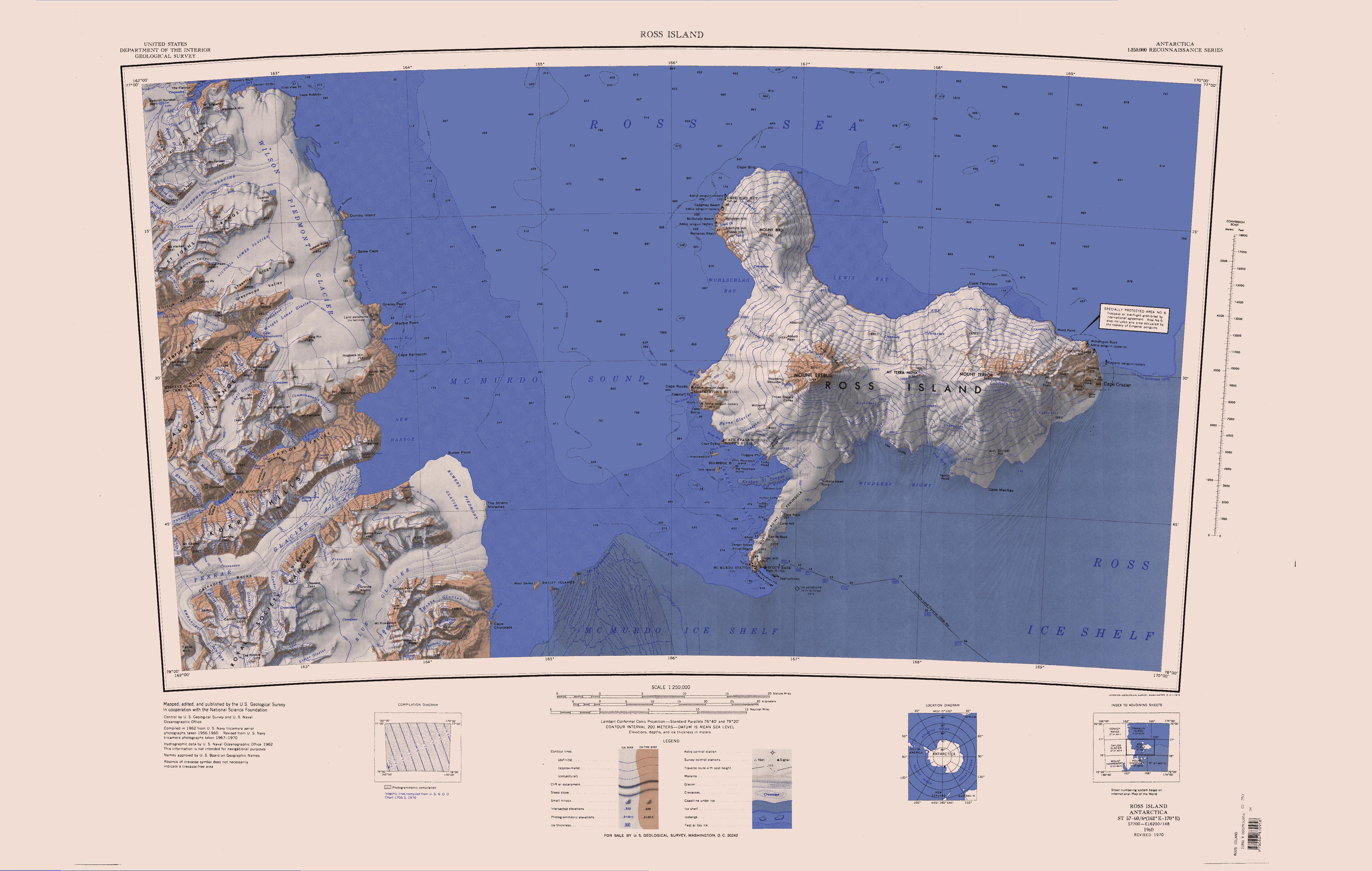
East end of Asgard Range south of center

Features include:

=== Mount Coleman ===
77°32′S 163°24′E. A rounded mountain, 1,110 metres (3,640 ft) high, standing immediately east of Commonwealth Glacier at the head of New Harbor in Victoria Land. Mapped by the BrAE under Scott, 1910-13. Named by C.S. Wright, a member of the expedition, for Professor Coleman, geologist, of Toronto University, Canada.

=== Harp Hill ===
77.519799°S 163.297964°E. A detached hill 750 metres (2,460 ft) high that is triangular in plan, the northwest and southeast sides of which are defined by ridgelike rock exposures, located at the north side of MacDonald Hills in Asgard Range, Victoria Land. Named descriptively by Advisory Committee on Antarctic Names (US-ACAN) (1997) from its distinctive appearance.

=== Mount Knox ===
77.548826°S 163.300297°E. A peak rising to about 800 metres (2,600 ft) high at the west extremity of MacDonald Hills, on the north side of Taylor Valley, Victoria Land. Named by the New Zealand Geographic Board (NZGB) (1998) after Professor Emeritus George A. Knox, formerly of the zoology department of the University of Canterbury, New Zealand Knox made numerous Antarctic visits and established the university’s Antarctic Research Unit that was active from 1961 until 1981; New Zealand delegate to SCAR 1974-86; President of SCAR 1978-82.

=== Territory Cirque ===
77.548233°S 163.32641°E. A cirque, 0.6 nautical miles (1.1 km; 0.69 mi) wide, which occupies the southernmost part of MacDonald Hills on the north wall of Taylor Valley. At 600 metres (2,000 ft) elevation, the cirque rises above the terminus of Commonwealth Glacier immediately southward. Named by New Zealand Geographic Board (NZGB) (1998) after a form of government to complement the Commonwealth (of Australia) Glacier.

=== Colony Cirque ===
77.544361°S 163.294731°E. A cirque immediately east of Mount Knox in MacDonald Hills. Named by NZGB (1998) after a form of government. The name complements the adjacent Commonwealth Glacier, named earlier by Captain R. F. Scott after the Commonwealth of Australia.

== Sources ==
- Alberts, Fred G., ed. (1995), Geographic Names of the Antarctic (PDF) (2 ed.), United States Board on Geographic Names This article incorporates public domain material from websites or documents of the United States Board on Geographic Names.
- "Colony Cirque", Geographic Names Information System, United States Geological Survey, United States Department of the Interior
- "Harp Hill", Geographic Names Information System, United States Geological Survey, United States Department of the Interior
- "MacDonald Hills", Geographic Names Information System, United States Geological Survey, United States Department of the Interior
- "Mount Knox", Geographic Names Information System, United States Geological Survey, United States Department of the Interior
- "Territory Cirque", Geographic Names Information System, United States Geological Survey, United States Department of the Interior

This article incorporates public domain material from websites or documents of the United States Geological Survey.
