= Hollingsworth Park =

Hollingsworth Park may refer to the following places in the United States:

- Hollingsworth Park (Lakeland, Florida)
- Hollingsworth Park, Braintree, Massachusetts
