= Hollingworth (surname) =

Hollingworth is a surname. Notable people with the surname include:

- Al Hollingworth (1918–2005), Canadian lawyer, politician and judge
- Clare Hollingworth (1911–2017), British journalist and author
- Elizabeth Hollingworth, Australian judge in the Supreme Court of Victoria
- Guy Hollingworth (born 1974), English barrister, conjuror, author and lecturer
- Harry Levi Hollingworth (1880–1956), American psychologist
- John Hollingworth (actor), British actor
- John Hollingworth (politician) (1930–2018), British politician
- Leta Stetter Hollingworth (1886–1939), American psychologist
- Lewis Hollingworth (1826–1876), English cricketer
- Peter Hollingworth (1935–2026), Australian Governor-General and Anglican archbishop

== See also ==
- Hollingsworth
- Hollinworth
