= Don Hollingsworth =

Canadian football player (born 1932)

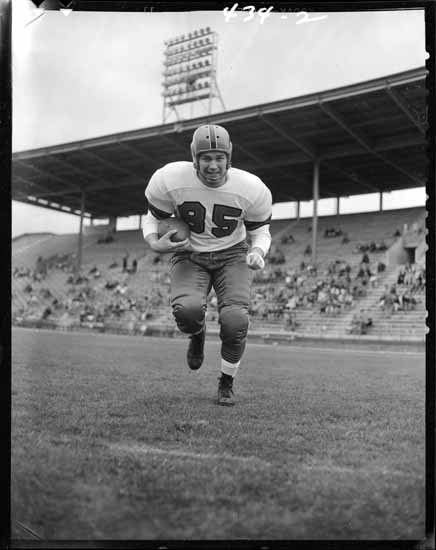
- Hollingsworth in 1954

Profile
- Position: Halfback

Personal information
- Born: c. 1932 (age 93–94)
- Listed height: 6 ft 1 in (1.85 m)
- Listed weight: 215 lb (98 kg)

Career history
- 1952–1953: Ottawa Rough Riders
- 1954: BC Lions

Don Hollingsworth (born c. 1932) was a Canadian professional football player who played for the BC Lions and Ottawa Rough Riders. He played junior football for the Ottawa Sooners.

In 1956, Hollingsworth pleaded guilty to 20 counts of uttering forged checks. In 1961, he was charged with fraud after cashing a bad cheque worth $2,800. Later that year, he was charged with the theft of $14,000 from the Bank of Montreal after he allegedly convinced a woman to take a job there in order to steal from it. He was found not guilty of the Bank of Montreal theft in 1962. At the time of his acquittal, he was serving a one-month prison sentence on the fraud charge.

Hollingsworth fenced some of the $750,000 in gold stolen by the Stopwatch Gang in their 1974 Ottawa Airport heist. He later moved to California, where he was part of a large crystal meth operation. While there, he helped the Stopwatch Gang acquire guns and other supplies for their robberies. Following his arrest on drug charges, Hollingsworth offered to identify the members of the gang in exchange for a reduction of his charges.

His son, Shawn Hollingsworth, was convicted of 10 bank robberies and pleaded guilty to manslaughter in 1987.
