= Mount Cronus =

Mountain in Enderby Land, Antarctica

Mount Cronus (67°18′S 50°3′E) is a majestic, conical, partially snow-covered peak, 900 metres (3,000 ft) high, rising 8 nautical miles (15 km) south of Amundsen Bay and 9 nautical miles (17 km) west-southwest of Reference Peak. It was sighted by an Australian National Antarctic Research Expeditions party in October 1956 and named for Cronus, the father of the gods in classical mythology.
