= Romero Hollingsworth =

Dutch footballer

Personal information
- Date of birth: 13 June 1987 (age 39)
- Place of birth: Amsterdam, Netherlands
- Position: Defender

Youth career
- SV Argon

Senior career*
Years	Team	Apps	(Gls)
2005–2007	FC Den Bosch	0	(0)
2007–2008	TOP Oss	0	(0)
- * Club domestic league appearances and goals

Romero Hollingsworth (born 13 June 1987) is a Dutch retired footballer who played as a defender.

He played for FC Den Bosch and joined TOP Oss in 2007.
