= Mount Marsland =

Mountain in Antarctica

Mount Marsland (67°11′S 51°14′E) is a mountain standing 6 nautical miles (11 km) south of the eastern part of Beaver Glacier in Enderby Land, Antarctica. It was plotted from air photos taken by Australian National Antarctic Research Expeditions in 1956 and was named by the Antarctic Names Committee of Australia in 1962 for F.L. Marsland, a member of the crew of the Discovery during the British Australian New Zealand Antarctic Research Expedition of 1929–31.
