= Fort Hollingsworth–White House =

Historic house in Georgia, United States

- U.S. National Register of Historic Places
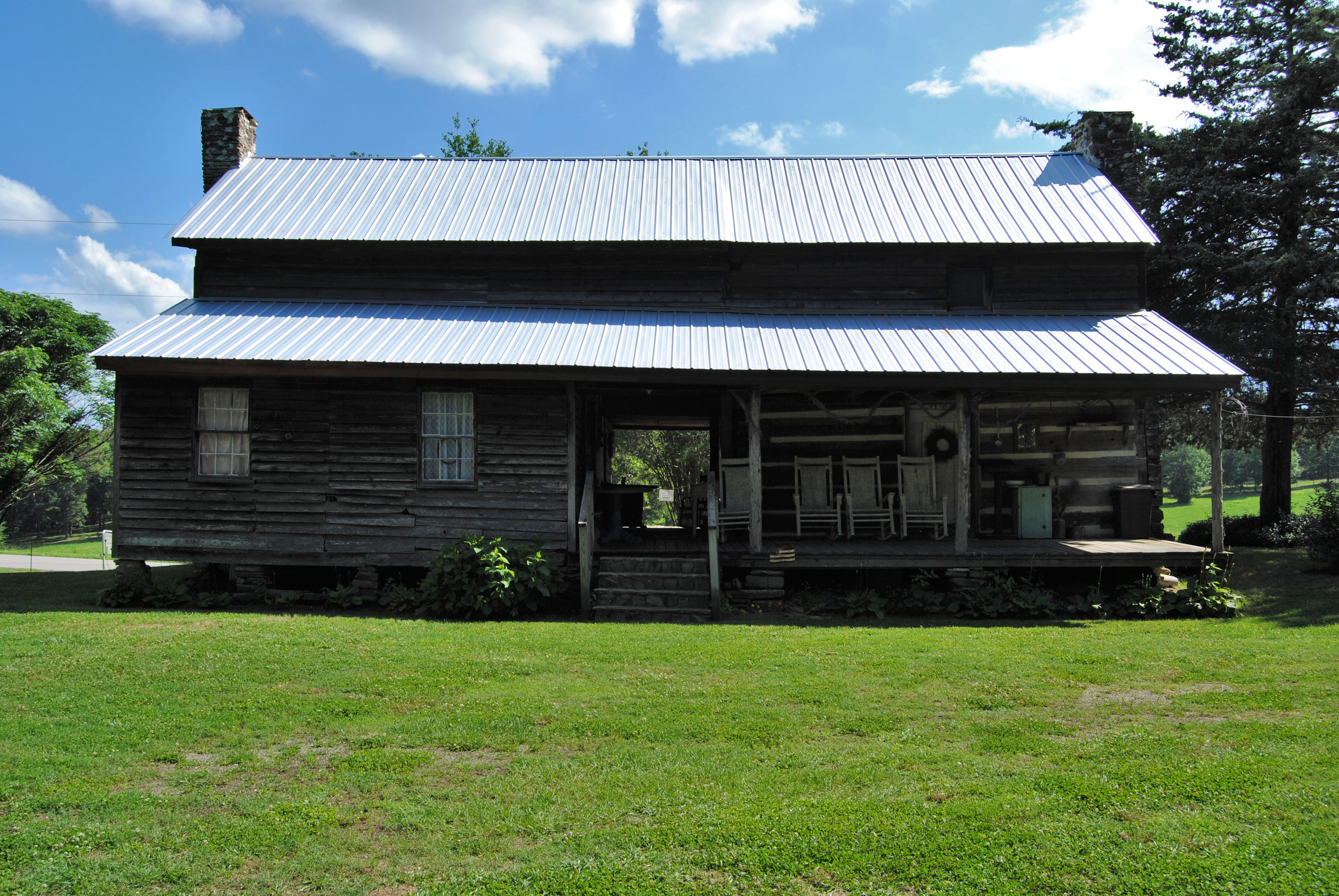

- Location within Georgia Location within the United States
- Interactive map showing the location of Fort Hollingsworth-White House
- Nearest city: Alto, Georgia
- Coordinates: 34°25′35.16″N 83°32′1.76″W
- Built: 1793
- NRHP reference No.: 98000973
- Added to NRHP: August 6, 1998

The Fort Hollingsworth–White House is a well-preserved example of an early frontier fort built near Alto, Georgia in the late 18th century. The fort was built around 1793 by Jacob Hollingsworth on newly opened lands resulting from treaties with the Cherokee Nation, and was meant to protect the settlers in the area. The fort was adapted as a farm residence, principally by the White family, and has passed through generations of owners. It is now operated as a non-profit open-air museum.

Fort Hollingsworth was first shown on a map of the Defensive Plan for the Western Frontier, for Franklin County in 1793.

== Colonial era ==
Georgia's boundaries in the 1700s can best be described as the wild frontier. Between 1782 and 1797 various treaties were made with the Indians to define Georgia's boundaries. Forts were built to protect the settlers who lived on the frontier from local indigenous Indians. Horses and farm animals were often stolen and families had to be protected in fortress-type buildings surrounded by wooden fences.

The lands of the first settlers of Franklin County, whose lands were granted by the State of Georgia between 1783 and 1788, lay north of the Indian Boundary fixed by the Treaty of Hopewell of 1785. These lands were granted under the impression that they lay south of the agreed boundary line. When this line was surveyed it was found that these lands lay north of the boundary line in the Cherokee Nation. The Indians demanded their immediate removal.

Col. William H. Wofford and Jacob Hollingsworth moved from North Carolina to Franklin County, Georgia in 1792. The area where they settled was known as Wofford's Settlement. When the line was surveyed by Benjamin Hawkins in 1798, Col. Wofford learned that their settlement was considered to be in Indian territory. He along with other settlers in the area petitioned Georgia Governor James Jackson to have the line re-drawn, or to take such action to protect them and their possessions from Indian raids.

Some sources claim that Col. Wofford mounted his horse and rode to Washington to talk with the authorities about his land holdings in Georgia. Settlers wrote a letter to Governor Josiah Tattnall, requesting a tract of land five miles wide between the Tugaloo and Apalachee Rivers, and asked the Governor to support their petition. The result was the "Four Mile Purchase" of 1804. The Indians ceded a strip of land four miles wide (from the Habersham – Banks County line on Baldwin Mountain, to Line Baptist Church on old Hwy. 441) and 23 miles long (extending from Currahee Mountain to the head waters of the South Oconee River) which included the Wofford Settlement. A line of felled trees some twenty-feet wide originally marked the line, which became a "no man's land." The United States agreed to pay the Cherokees $5,000 and $1,000 per annum for the property rights.

When the boundary lines were redrawn as part of the Treaty of Tellico, Fort Hollingsworth was in Franklin County, then in Habersham County and finally in Banks County (1858).

By about 1796, conflicts with local Indian tribes were no longer a concern and the string of frontier forts were no longer necessary. The forts soon became log farmhouses.

The Woffords and Hollingsworths traveled together to new frontiers in the West using passports to travel through Indian territory. Genealogy records show, as the years passed, that many of their descendants packed up their belongings and moved farther west. Fort Hollingsworth was left on vacant lands.

In Habersham County Inferior Court, setting as a land court, May term 1855, William B. Wofford, son of Nathaniel Wofford, grandson of Col. William H. Wofford, petitioned the court for a head rights warrant for vacant lands. He received the grant from the state on Oct. 2, 1855. He sold Fort Hollingsworth to Robert McMillan on April 18, 1857. McMillan soon after sold the property to John Lane.

== John Lane obtains Fort Hollingsworth ==
John Lane owned the property for a little over a month when the Civil War started. He then went to war, serving in Company D of the 43rd Regiment of Georgia (CSA). He also served in the Volunteer Infantry in the Army of Tennessee (CSA), otherwise known as the "Middle River Volunteers." Lane would not return from his service in the Confederate States Army. He was killed in Tennessee while he was returning from getting water from a spring in a friendly fire incident. His men mistook him for the enemy and shot him.

== The White House ==
Joshua White and Katharine Lane White (John's sister) obtained the fort and made it their home. They built the addition to the two story single pen that had been the fort and made it look like any other farmhouse of the mid 1800s. The addition was linked to the original structure by a covered walkway, known as a dogtrot.

In 1903 the fort was passed to the children of Joshua and Katharine Lane White. Lafayette (Fate) and Emma Payne White raised their family there. In 1936 Beacher White, grandson of Josh and Katy White, acquired the property. In 1980 it passed to Beacher and Mellie Segars White's children.

Fort Hollingsworth–White House looks very much today as it did in the 1860s. It is listed on the National Register of Historic Places. Fort Hollingsworth–White House is operated by the non-profit organization, Friends of the Fort.

A recent addition to the property was the acquisition (and ongoing restoration) of some outbuildings from the Chandler-David family property near Five Points on the Old Carnesville Road in Banks County. These buildings include a smoke house, a wash house, and a corn crib, all dating from around 1835–1840.

== Archaeology at Fort Hollingsworth ==
The LAMAR Institute performed a Ground Penetrating Radar (GPR) survey of major portions of the yard at Fort Hollingsworth in 2014. The results of this survey are fully documented in a research report by Daniel T. Elliott.
