= Friis Hills =

Cluster of hills in Victoria Land, Antarctica

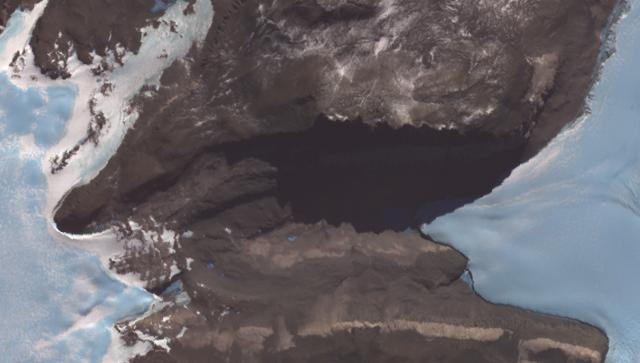
Satellite image of the Simmons Basin, north of Taylor Glacier, taken by ASTER Earth-observing instrument on NASA's Terra satellite. Top: Friis Hills, in their shadow Simmons Lake; bottom (truncated): Solitary Rocks

The Friis Hills (77°45′S 161°28′E) are a cluster of ice-free hills, 6 nautical miles (11 km) in extent and rising to 1,750 metres (5,740 ft), on the north side of the bend in Taylor Glacier in Victoria Land, Antarctica. They were named after geographer and archivist Herman Ralph Friis (1906–89), Director of the Center for Polar Archives in the National Archives, a U.S. exchange scientist at the Japanese station East Ongul Island, 1969–70, and a member of the Advisory Committee on Antarctic Names, 1957–73.

Although currently "dead and dry, nothing but gravel and sand and boulders" the Friis Hills contain important geological records of the times when Antarctica was much greener.
