= Mount McLennan (Victoria Land) =

Mountain in Ross Dependency, Antarctica

Coordinates: 77°35′S 162°56′E

Mount McLennan is a prominent mountain rising over 1,600 metres (5,250 ft) at the north side of Taylor Valley, surmounting the area at the heads of Canada Glacier, Commonwealth Glacier and Loftus Glacier, in Victoria Land, Antarctica. It was named by C.S. Wright of the British Antarctic Expedition (1910–13) for Professor McLennan, a physicist at Toronto University, Canada.

Geologist Thomas E. Berg killed in helicopter crash (11/19/1969) on the side of Mount McLennan. New Zealand cameraman Jeremy Sykes also killed.
