= Katherine Hollingsworth =

American politician

Katherine Hollingsworth is a former American Democratic politician from who served in the Missouri House of Representatives.

Born in Columbia, Missouri, she attended St. Pius X. High School, Jefferson College, and Southeast Missouri State University. She previously worked as a paralegal for a department store company.
