= Al Hollingsworth =

Al Hollingsworth may refer to:

- Al Hollingworth (1918–2005), Canadian, lawyer, politician, and judge
- Al Hollingsworth (baseball) (1908–1996), American Major League Baseball pitcher
- Alvin Hollingsworth (1928–2000), American painter and comics artist
