= Howard Hills =

Hills in Antarctica

The Howard Hills (67°6′S 51°9′E) are an area of low hills and meltwater lakes south of Beaver Glacier in the northeastern part of the Scott Mountains, Enderby Land, Antarctica. They were plotted from air photos taken from Australian National Antarctic Research Expeditions aircraft in 1956, and named by the Antarctic Names Committee of Australia after W.E. Howard, a member of the crew of the Discovery during the British Australian New Zealand Antarctic Research Expedition, 1929–31.
