= Ruth Hollingsworth =

British artist (1880-1945)

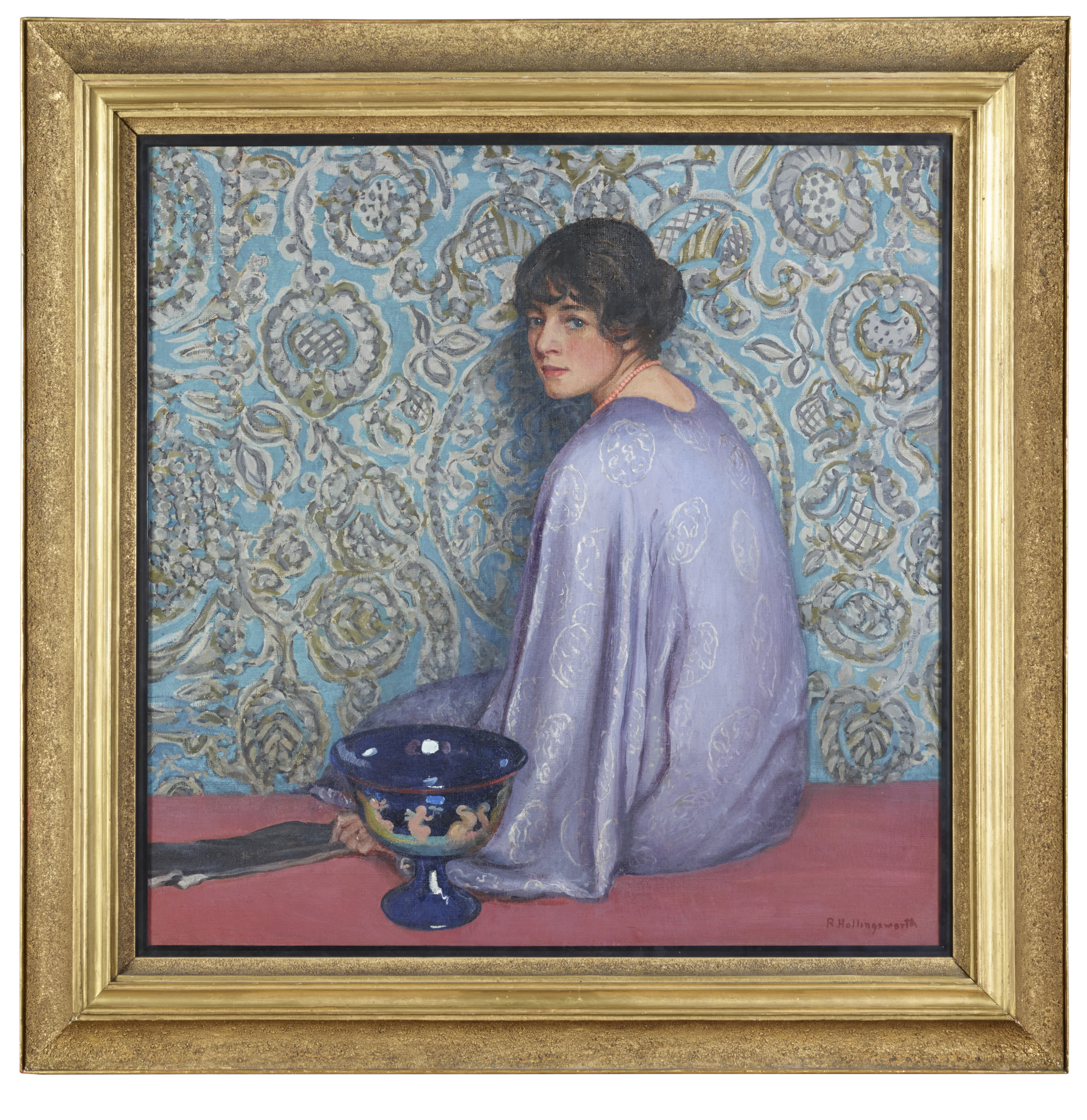
- Odette by Hollingsworth
- Born: 29 August 1880; Clapham, London, England
- Died: 14 March 1945 (aged 64); Dedham, Essex, England
- Education: Slade School of Art
- Known for: Painting
- Spouse: Richard Sydney Hellaby (m.1917 - 1945, her death)

Ruth Hollingsworth (29 August 1880 – 14 March 1945) was a British artist known for her landscapes, figure and flower paintings.

== Biography ==
Hollingsworth was born in Clapham in London and was the fourth of the five daughters born to Alexander Hollingsworth, a newspaper proprietor, and his wife Charlotte Ellen née Allen. Hollingsworth attended the Slade School of Art and the London School of Art. She lived in London and later at Dedham in Essex and painted landscapes in Breconshire and in Italy. Hollingsworth exhibited at the Royal Academy in London, with the New English Art Club, with the Society of Women Artists and elsewhere. In the 1930s she was a regular exhibitor with the Ipswich Art Club. In 1917 she married the artist Richard Sydney Hellaby and sometimes signed her works as Ruth Hellaby. A number of museums in Britain hold examples of her work and the collection of the Museum of New Zealand Te Papa Tongarewa includes two of her paintings, including a portrait of a young women, Odette.
