= Newall Glacier =

Glacier in Antarctica

- Location within Antarctica
- Location: Ross Dependency
- Coordinates: 77°30′S 162°50′E
- Terminus: Ross Sea

The Newall Glacier (77°30′S 162°50′E) is a glacier in the east part of the Asgard Range of Victoria Land, It flows east between Mount Newall and Mount Weyant into the Wilson Piedmont Glacier. The Newall Glacier was mapped by the N.Z. Northern Survey Party of the CTAE, 1956-58, who named it after nearby Mount Newall.

== Location ==
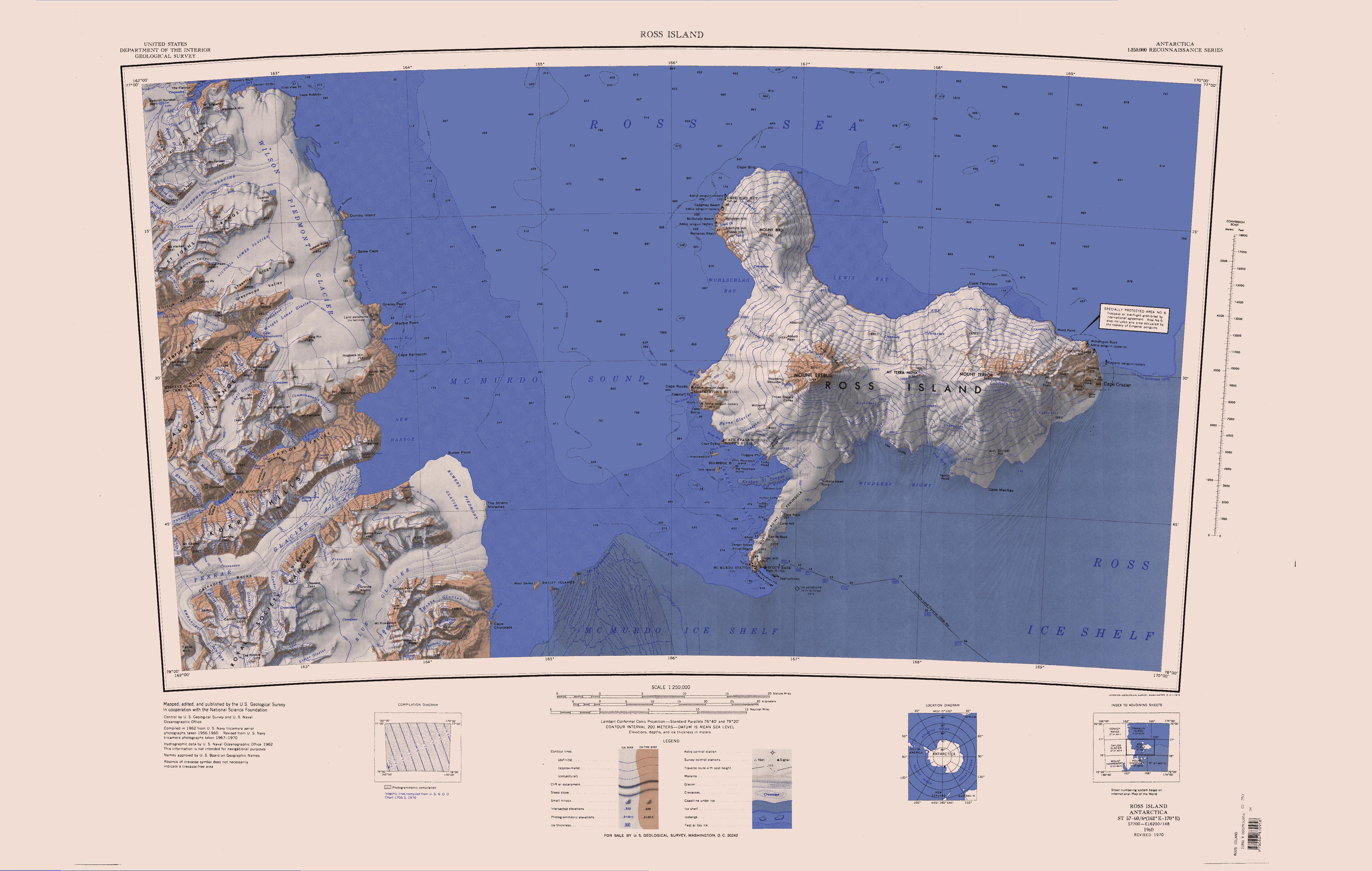
Wilson Piedmont Glacier in northwest of map

The Newall Glacier forms to the east of the Lacroix Glacier, which flows south into Taylor Valley. It flows northeast, past the head of Suess Glacier, past Mount Valkyrie to the west and Mount Weyant to the east. It turns east and is joined by the Loftus Glacier below Mount Newall. It continues east past the head of Commonwealth Glacier and joins with Wright Lower Glacier as it flows into Wilson Piedmont Glacier.

== Features ==
Features, from southwest to northeast, include Lyons Cone, Twickler Cone, Unwin Ledge, Hothern Cliffs, Mount Hall, Loftus Glacier, Mount Weyant, Mount Saga, Hetha Peak, Commanda Glacier and Repeater Glacier.

=== Lyons Cone ===
77.631911°S 162.504109°E. A cone shaped peak 2.4 nautical miles (4.4 km; 2.8 mi) north-northeast of the Matterhorn, rising to 1,850 metres (6,070 ft) high on the ridge separating the heads of Lacroix Glacier, Newall Glacier, and Suess Glacier. Named by the United States Advisory Committee on Antarctic Names (US-ACAN) after William Berry Lyons, American geochemist, veteran of expeditions to the Himalayas, Greenland, Iceland, and Antarctica, 1980-97; chief scientist, McMurdo Dry Valleys Long-Term Ecological Research (LTER) field team, 1993-97. As a member of a University of New Hampshire field party, 1988-89, Lyons participated in glaciochemical investigations that collected two ice cores, 150 and 175 metres (492 and 574 ft) deep, from upper Newall Glacier, in proximity of this peak.

=== Twickler Cone ===
77.607557°S 162.371341°E. A cone-shaped peak rising to 1,950 metres (6,400 ft) high on the ridge separating the upper reaches of Bartley Glacier and Newall Glacier. Named by the US-ACAN in 1997 after Mark S. Twickler, a specialist in recovery, analysis, and interpretation of ice core records, with many seasons in Antarctica and Greenland, 1984-95; Executive Director, National Ice Core Laboratory-Science Management Office, from 1997. As a member of a University of New Hampshire field party, 1988-89, Twickler participated in glaciochemical investigations that collected two ice cores, 150 and 175 m high deep, from upper Newall Glacier, in proximity of this peak.

=== Unwin Ledge ===
77.579139°S 162.644003°E. A flat-topped ridge or tableland, located to the west of Hothem Cliffs and 1 nautical mile (1.9 km; 1.2 mi) south of Mount Hall. The upper surface of the feature (1,950 metres (6,400 ft) high) is ice covered and rises 400 metres (1,300 ft) high above the heads of the adjacent Newall Glacier and Canada Glacier. Named by the New Zealand Geographic Board (NZGB) (1998) after R.S. Unwin, former superintendent of the New Zealand DSIR Geophysical Observatory, who was active in research at Scott Base from 1958-59.

=== Hothem Cliffs ===
77.574202°S 162.720974°E. A line of abrupt rock cliffs at the north side of the head of Canada Glacier. Named by the US-ACAN (1997) after Larry D. Hothem, American geodesist, who wintered-over with Australian National Antarctic Research Expeditions (ANARE) at Mawson Station, 1969; with the United States Geological Survey (USGS) from 1991.

=== Ball Peak ===
77.567893°S 162.788245°E. A peak rising to 1,700 metres (5,600 ft) at the head of Loftus Glacier. Ball Peak stands 0.7 nautical miles (1.3 km; 0.81 mi) southwest of Mount McLennan in proximity to Mount Hall and Harris Peak, with which this naming is associated. Named by New Zealand Geographic Board (NZGB) (1998) after Gary Ball, New Zealand Antarctic Division field guide and instructor in survival training at Scott Base, 1976-77; field guide, northern Victoria Land GANOVEX expedition, 1979-80. Gary Ball died in the Himalayas, 1993.

=== Harris Peak ===
77.5666667°S 162.7°E. A peak rising to 1,750 meters (5,740 ft) high, 1.4 nautical miles (2.6 km; 1.6 mi) south of Mount Weyant. Harris Peak is located between Mount Hall and Ball Peak, with which this naming is associated. Named by the New Zealand Geographic Board, 1998, after A.M. “Andy” Harris (who died on Mount Everest with Rob Hall), a guide and New Zealand Antarctic Research Program (NZARP) field leader, 1987-92, including two trips to Marie Byrd Land.

=== Mount Hall ===
77.5666667°S 162.6°E. A peak rising to 1,800 metres (5,900 ft), 1.6 nautical miles (3.0 km; 1.8 mi) southwest of Mount Weyant. Mount Hall stands close westward of Harris Peak and Ball Peak, with which this naming is associated. Named by the NZGB, 1998, after Rob Hall (who died on Mount Everest with A.M. “Andy” Harris), a guide who worked two seasons for New Zealand Antarctic Research Program (NZARP) as field training instructor and, in the 1990s, guided clients (with Gary Ball) on climbs in Ellsworth Mountains.

=== Mount McLennan ===
77°35′S 162°56′E. A prominent mountain rising over 1,600 metres (5,200 ft) at the north side of Taylor Valley, surmounting the area at the heads of Canada, Commonwealth, and Loftus Glaciers Named by C.S. Wright of the BrAE (1910-13) for Professor McLennan, physicist of Toronto University, Canada.

=== Loftus Glacier ===
77°33′S 162°46′E. Valley glacier between Mount Weyant and Mount McLennan, which flows north to join Newall Glacier. Named by the US-ACAN in 1964 for Chief Journalist Leo G. Loftus, USN, who served five summer seasons at McMurdo Station, 1959–64.

=== Hoffman Peak ===
77.537845°S 162.874691°E. A peak rising to 1,550 metres (5,090 ft) high, north-northeast of Mount McLennan. Named by New Zealand Geographic Board (NZGB) (1998) after J.H. (Jack) Hoffman, a drilling specialist who helped establish the New Zealand Scott Base and erect its various antennae.

=== Mount Weyant ===
77°33′S 162°42′E. A prominent ice-free summit, 1,930 metres (6,330 ft) high, between Loftus Glacier and Newall Glacier. Named by the US-ACAN in 1964 for William S. Weyant, meteorologist in charge with the winter party at Little America V in 1958.

=== Mount Saga ===
77.54669°S 162.448528°E. A peak rising to 1,750 metres (5,740 ft) high, 1.2 nautical miles (2.2 km; 1.4 mi) southwest of Hetha Peak. The summit surmounts a ridge at the southern extremity of the head of Hart Glacier. In association with the theme of names in Asgard Range, named by the NZGB (1994) after a goddess in Norse mythology whose name means “seeress.”

=== Hetha Peak ===
77.530626°S 162.52592°E. A peak, 1,700 metres (5,600 ft) high, situated 1.5 nautical miles (2.8 km; 1.7 mi) northeast of Mount Saga on the ridge bounding the west side of Newall Glacier. In association with the names from Norse mythology grouped in this range, named by the NZGB (1998) after Hetha, a mythological Norse earth goddess.

=== Commanda Glacier ===
77.49354°S 162.785436°E. A steep glacier flowing eastward from Mount Newall to the south of Mount Ponder. The glacier enters lower Newall Glacier westward of Sagittate Hill. Named by the NZGB (1998) because Antarctica NZ installed a radio repeater on nearby Mount Newall. Commanda was the model name for a high frequency radio used by early NZ field parties.

=== Repeater Glacier ===
77.484883°S 162.842985°E. A steep glacier, 0.9 nautical miles (1.7 km; 1.0 mi) long, flowing east from Ponder Peak. This glacier and the Commanda Glacier, close southward, drain the eastern slopes of the Mount Newall massif before entering lower Newall Glacier. Named by the NZGB (1998) in recognition of the radio repeater installed by New Zealand on Mount Newall.

== Sources ==
- Alberts, Fred G., ed. (1995), Geographic Names of the Antarctic (PDF) (2 ed.), United States Board on Geographic Names This article incorporates public domain material from websites or documents of the United States Board on Geographic Names.
- "Ball Peak", Geographic Names Information System, United States Geological Survey, United States Department of the Interior
- "Commanda Glacier", Geographic Names Information System, United States Geological Survey, United States Department of the Interior
- "Harris Peak", Geographic Names Information System, United States Geological Survey, United States Department of the Interior
- "Hetha Peak", Geographic Names Information System, United States Geological Survey, United States Department of the Interior
- "Hoffman Peak", Geographic Names Information System, United States Geological Survey, United States Department of the Interior
- "Hothem Cliffs", Geographic Names Information System, United States Geological Survey, United States Department of the Interior
- "Lyons Cone", Geographic Names Information System, United States Geological Survey, United States Department of the Interior
- "Mount Hall", Geographic Names Information System, United States Geological Survey, United States Department of the Interior
- "Mount Saga", Geographic Names Information System, United States Geological Survey, United States Department of the Interior
- "Repeater Glacier", Geographic Names Information System, United States Geological Survey, United States Department of the Interior
- Ross Island, USGS: United States Geological Survey
- "Twickler Cone", Geographic Names Information System, United States Geological Survey, United States Department of the Interior
- "Unwin Ledge", Geographic Names Information System, United States Geological Survey, United States Department of the Interior
- This article incorporates public domain material from websites or documents of the United States Geological Survey.
