= Mount Hollingsworth =

Mountain in Enderby Land, Antarctica

Mount Hollingsworth (67°15′S 50°21′E) is a mountain 1 nautical mile (2 km) south of Priestley Peak, close south of Amundsen Bay in Enderby Land, Antarctica. It was plotted from air photos taken from Australian National Antarctic Research Expeditions aircraft in 1956, and was named by the Antarctic Names Committee of Australia for R.J.T. Hollingsworth, a geophysicist at Mawson Station in 1961.
