= Scott Mountains (Antarctica) =

Mountain range in Antarctica

Scott Mountains in Antarctica

The Scott Mountains are a large number of isolated peaks lying south of Amundsen Bay in Enderby Land of East Antarctica, Antarctica. Discovered on 13 January 1930 by the British Australian New Zealand Antarctic Research Expedition (BANZARE) under Sir Douglas Mawson. He named the feature Scott Range after Captain Robert Falcon Scott, Royal Navy. The term mountains is considered more appropriate because of the isolation of its individual features.

== List of mountains ==
- Mount Alekseyev (67°28′S 50°40′E) is a mountain, 927 m, standing 6 nautical miles (11 km) northeast of the McNaughton Ridges. Named by the Soviet Antarctic Expedition, 1961–62, for A.D. Alekseyev, Soviet polar pilot.
- Mount Brockelsby (67°34′S 50°11′E) is a mountain, 1,290 m, standing 7 nautical miles (13 km) north of Simpson Peak. Plotted from air photos taken from ANARE aircraft in 1956. Named by Antarctic Names Committee of Australia (ANCA) for W.K. Brockelsby, ionosphere physicist at Mawson Station in 1961.
- Debenham Peak or Mount Debenham (67°21′S 50°26′E) is a peak, 1,140 m, lying south of Amundsen Bay, about 7 miles (11 km) east of Mount Cronus. Discovered on 13 or 14 January 1930 by BANZARE, who named it for Frank Debenham. The peak was more accurately positioned by ANARE (Australian National Antarctic Research Expeditions), 1954-58.
- Mount George (67°43′S 50°00′E) is a mountain, 1,555 m, close west of Simpson Peak. Plotted from air photos taken by ANARE in 1956 and 1957. The name was first applied by John Biscoe (1830–31), probably after one of the Enderby Brothers, the owners of his vessel. As Biscoe's feature could not be identified among the many peaks in the area, the name was applied to this feature by ANCA in 1962.
- Mount Giddings (67°25′S 50°47′E) is a mountain 6 nautical miles (11 km) southeast of Debenham Peak. Plotted from air photos taken from ANARE aircraft in 1956. Named by Antarctic Names Committee of Australia (ANCA) after J.E. Giddings, a cook at Mawson Station in 1961.
- McNaughton Ridges (67°32′S 50°27′E) is a group of ridges 12 nautical NE (22 km) of Simpson Peak. Plotted from air photos taken from ANARE aircraft in 1956 and 1957. Named by ANCA for I.L.K. McNaughton, a physicist at Mawson Station in 1961.
- Oblachnaya Nunatak (67°41′S 51°16′E) is a nunatak lying 6 nautical miles (11 km) southeast of Perov Nunataks, at the east margin of Scott Mountains. The geology of the nunatak was investigated by the Soviet Antarctic Expedition, 1961–62, which called it "Gora Oblachnaya" (cloudy mountain).
- Perov Nunataks (67°35′S 51°6′E) is a small group of nunataks on the eastern edge of the Scott Mountains, 19 mi SE of Debenham Peak. Photographed in October 1956 by ANARE aircraft and surveyed in November 1958 by an airborne field party. Named by ANCA for Viktor Perov, pilot of a Soviet aircraft which flew over this area and rescued the 1958 Belgian field party after an aircraft accident.
- Simpson Peak (67°43′S 50°7′E) is a peak, 1,720 m, just east of Mount George in the southwest end of the Scott Mountains. Discovered on 14 January 1930 by BANZARE under Mawson who named it for Sir George Simpson. The position of the feature was fixed by J.C. Armstrong of ANARE (Australian National Antarctic Research Expeditions) in 1959.
- Ward Rock (67°8′S 51°21′E) is a rounded rock exposure just east of the Howard Hills in the northeast part of the Scott Mountains. Plotted from air photos taken from ANARE aircraft in 1956. Named by Antarctic Names Committee of Australia (ANCA) for F.J. Ward, a member of the crew of Discovery during the British Australian New Zealand Antarctic Research Expedition, 1929-31.

== See also ==
- Francis Peaks
- Mount Park
