= Mount Streich =

Mountain in Antarctica

Mount Streich (78°9′S 158°53′E) is a buttress-type mountain (2250 m) that rises above Skelton Icefalls midway between Angino Buttress and Portal Mountain. Named after Lieutenant Paul R. (Bob) Streich, one of the first pilots in US Navy Squadron VX-6 during Operation Deep Freeze I and Ii, 1955–57. An "Otter" pilot, he flew from Little America V and provided aerial reconnaissance for the establishment of Byrd Station.
