= Taylor Glacier =

Antarctic glacier

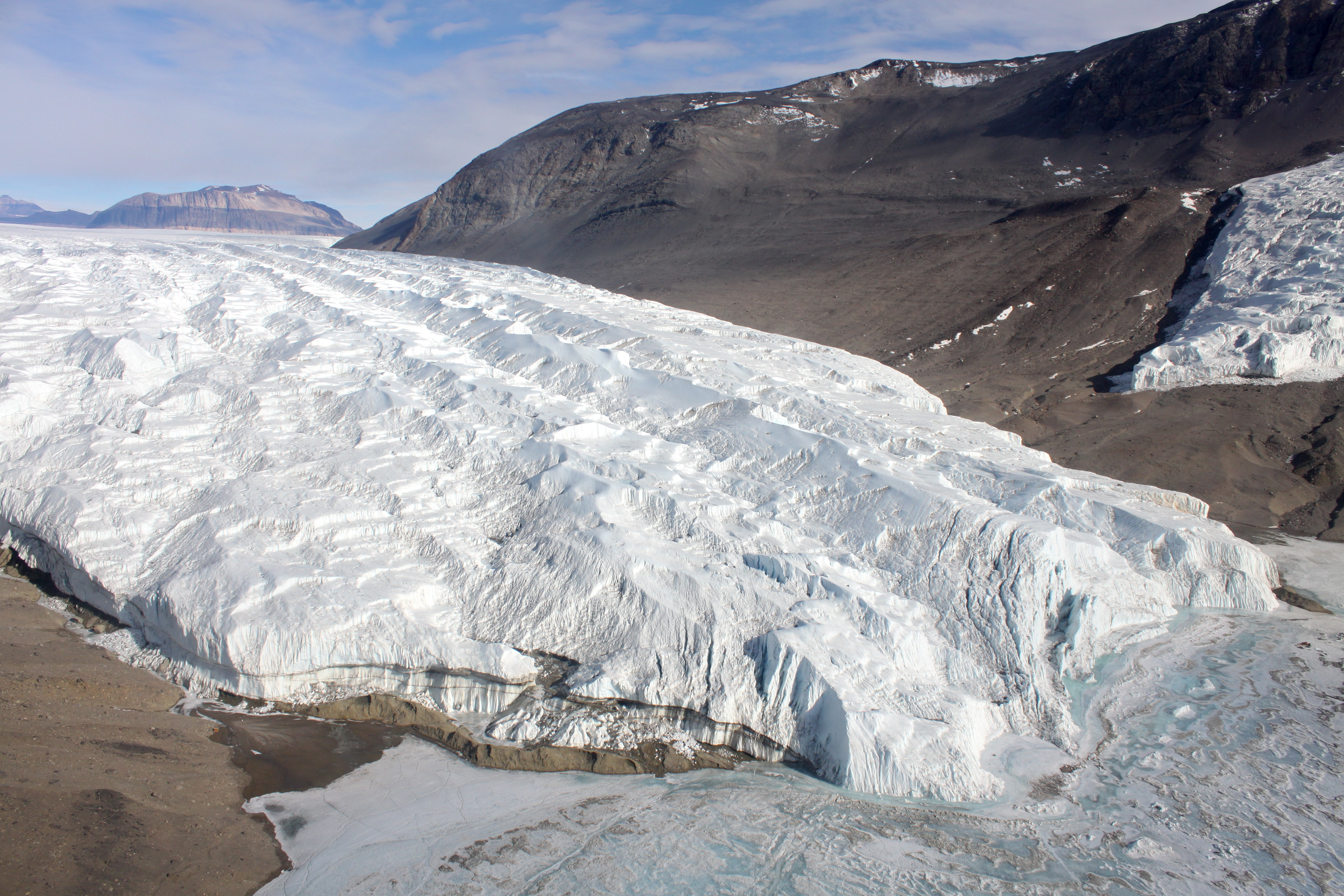

- Location within Antarctica
- Type: Polar Glacier
- Location: Antarctica
- Coordinates: 77°44′S 162°10′E
- Status: Stable

The Taylor Glacier (77°44′S 162°10′E) is a glacier in Antarctica about 35 nautical miles (65 km; 40 mi) long, flowing from the plateau of Victoria Land into the western end of Taylor Valley, north of the Kukri Hills. It flows to the south of the Asgard Range. The middle part of the glacier is bounded on the north by the Inland Forts and on the south by Beacon Valley.

== History ==
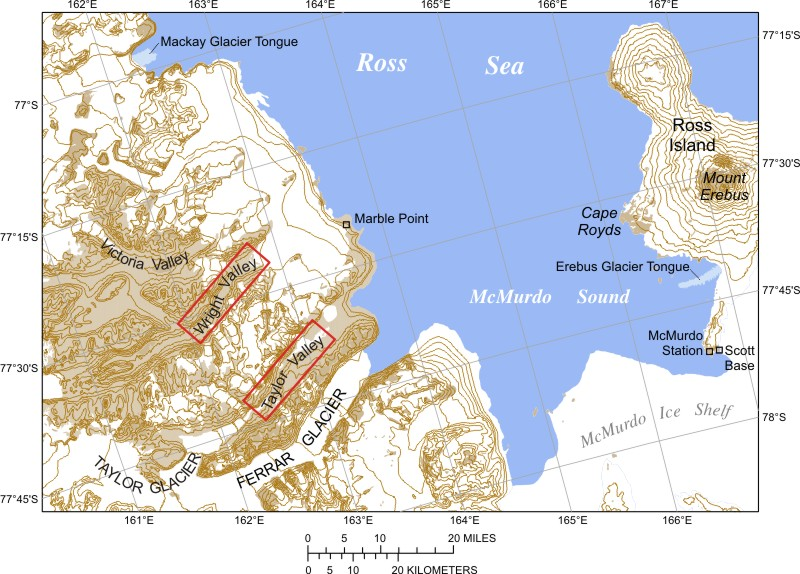
Taylor and Ferrar Glaciers and McMurdo Sound, Antarctica

The Taylor Glacier was discovered by the British National Antarctic Expedition (BrNAE, 1901–1904) and at that time thought to be a part of Ferrar Glacier. The Western Journey Party of the British Antarctic Expedition of 1910 determined that the upper and lower portions of what was then known as Ferrar Glacier are apposed, i.e., joined in Siamese-twin fashion north of Knobhead. With this discovery Robert Falcon Scott named the upper portion for Thomas Griffith Taylor, geologist and leader of the Western Journey Party.

== Glaciology Research ==
The Taylor Glacier has been the focus of a measurement and modeling effort carried out by researchers from the University of California, Berkeley and the University of Texas at Austin. Like other glaciers in the McMurdo Dry Valleys, Taylor Glacier is "cold-based", meaning its bottom is frozen to the ground below. The rest of the world's glaciers are "wet-based", meaning they scrape over the bedrock, picking up and leaving obvious piles of debris (moraines) along their edges. Cold-based glaciers flow more like putty, pushed forward by their own weight. Cold-based glaciers pick up minimal debris, cause little erosion, and leave only small moraines. They also look different from above. Instead of having surfaces full of crevasses, cold-based glaciers are comparatively flat and smooth.

== Location ==
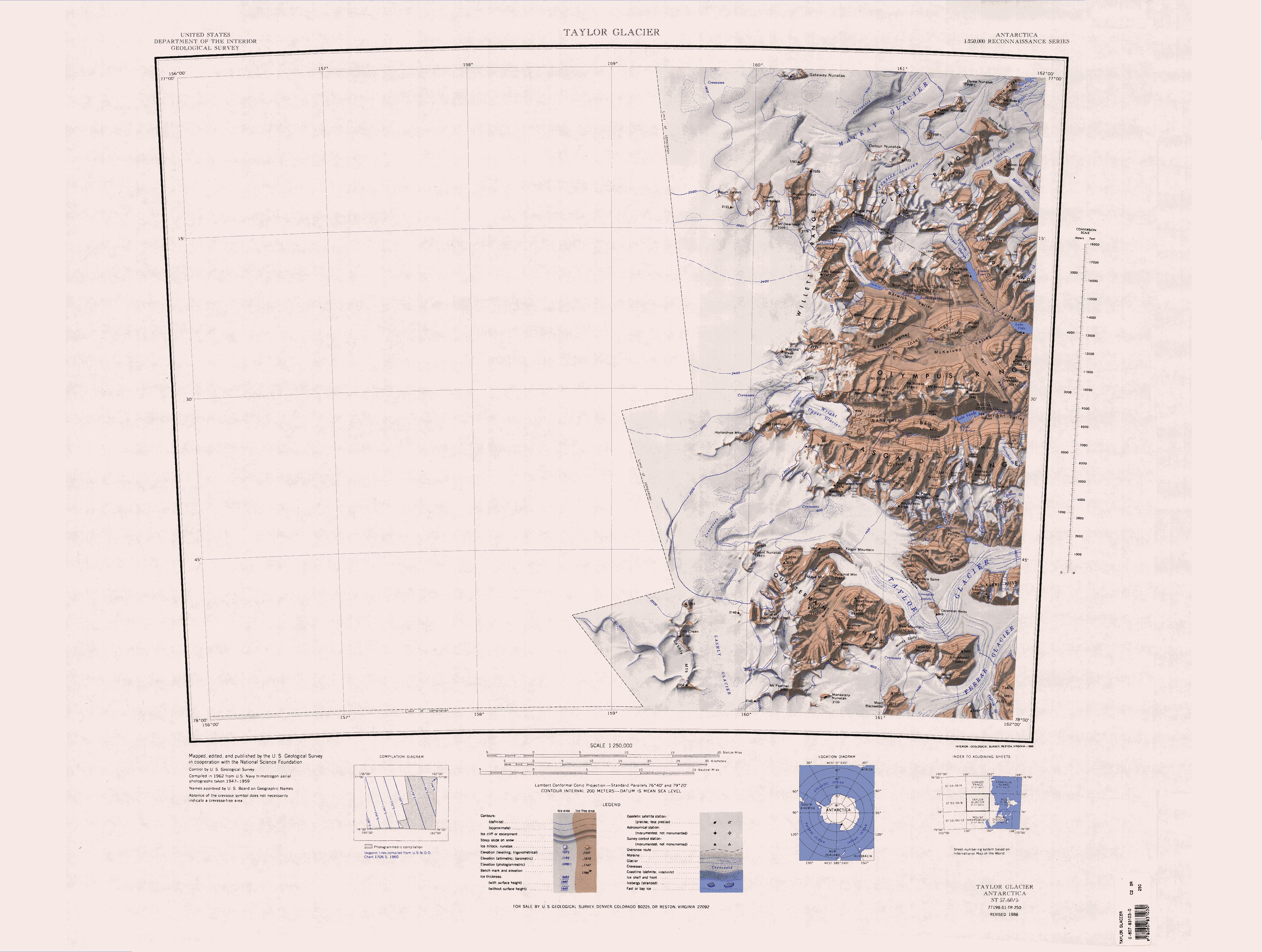
Taylor Glacier south of center of mapped region

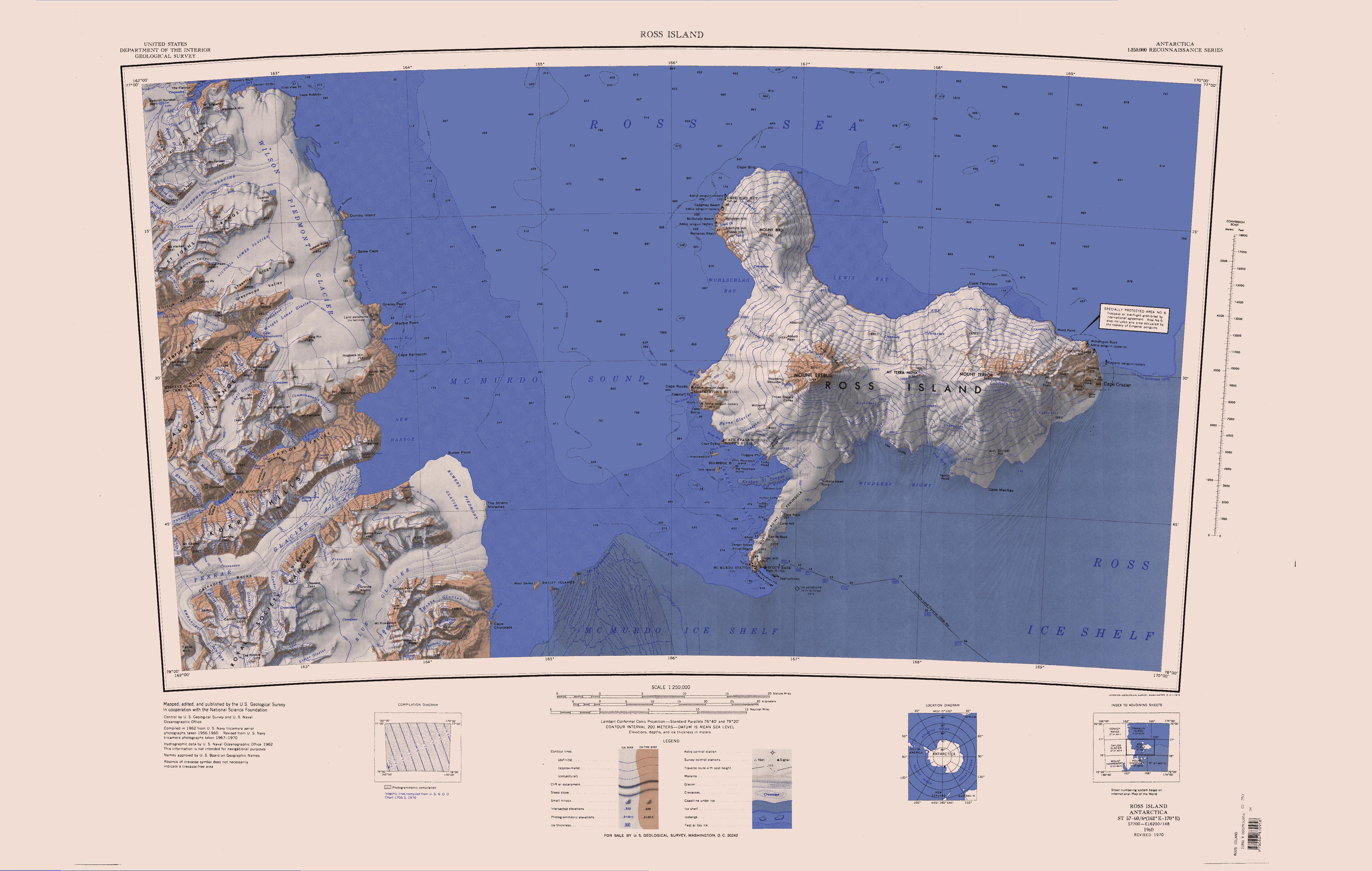
East end of Taylor Glacier south of center

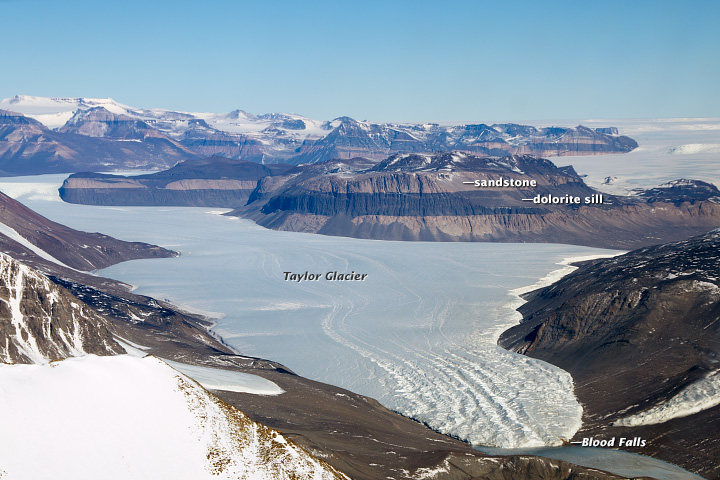
Taylor Glacier, Taylor Valley and Blood Falls, 2013

The Taylor Glacier originates on the polar plateau to the west of Horseshoe Mountain and Depot Nunatak. It flow east past Finger Mountain in the Quartermain Mountains to the south, and past Beehive Mountain in the Asgard Range to the north, then turn southeast and flows past the Solitary Rocks, Cavendish Icefalls and the Cavendish Rocks to the northeast, and past Knobhead to the south, where it turns northeast. There it is apposed, i.e., joined in Siamese-twin fashion, to the Ferrar Glacier. The glaciers separate, and the Taylor Glacier turns east past the western end of the Kukri Hills, flowing to the north of the Kukri Hills, while the Ferrar Glacier flows to the south of the Kukri Hills. The Catspaw Glacier and Stocking Glacier flow towards the Taylor Glacier from the Asgard Range, but do not reach it. Further east the Taylor Glacier tapers out at the west end of the Taylor Valley, where a small section of the glacier flows into Lake Bonney.

== Features ==
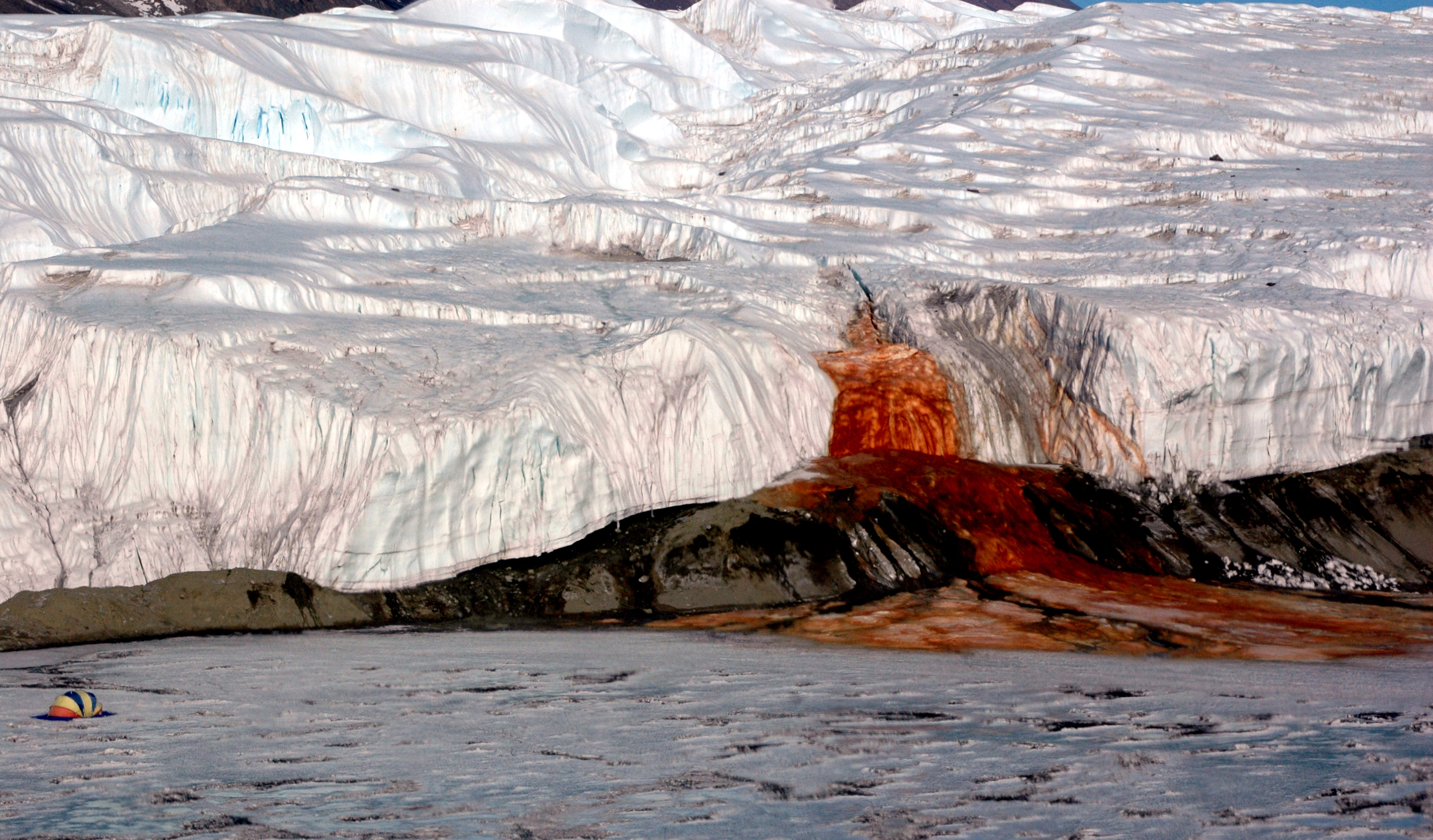
Blood Falls, 2006

Named features of the glacier, from west to east, include,

=== Taylor Dome ===
77°40′S 157°40′E. An elliptical ice dome, 43 nautical miles (80 km; 49 mi) long ESE-WNW and 16 nautical miles (30 km; 18 mi) wide, rising to 2,400 metres (7,900 ft), centered about 29 nautical miles (54 km; 33 mi) west-northwest of Mount Crean, Lashly Mountains. The feature was delineated by the SPRI-NSF-TUD airborne radio echo sounding program, 1967–79. The name was first used by David J. Drewry of SPRI in 1980. The dome is one of the local sources of ice to the Taylor Glacier, from which it is named. Approved by United States Advisory Committee on Antarctic Names (US-ACAN) in 1994.

=== Depot Nunatak ===
77°45′S 160°04′E. Nunatak, 1,980 metres (6,500 ft) high, standing at the west side of Cassidy Glacier and Quartermain Mountains. Nearly vertical cliffs of columnar dolerite rise 150 metres (490 ft) above glacier level at the east end. So named by the BrNAE (1901–04), on their western journey in 1903, because they made a food depot there, for use on their return.

=== Marvin Nunatak ===
77°46′S 160°03′E. A prominent nunatak 1 nautical mile (1.9 km; 1.2 mi) south of Depot Nunatak, rising to 2,090 metres (6,860 ft) on the west side of Cassidy Glacier, to the west of the Quartermain Mountains. Presumably first seen by BrNAE, 1901–04, from nearby Depot Nunatak. Named by US-ACAN in 1992 after Ursula Marvin, Smithsonian Astrophysical Observatory, Cambridge, MA; field party member, Antarctic Search for Meteorites (ANSMET) expedition to Victoria Land, 1978–79 and 1981–82; field work at Seymour Island, 1984–85; member of the Advisory Committee to the Division of Polar Programs, NSF, from 1983.

=== Cassidy Glacier ===
77°46′S 160°09′E. A glacier 7 nautical miles (13 km; 8.1 mi) long and 2 nautical miles (3.7 km; 2.3 mi) wide, flowing northeast into upper Taylor Glacier between Depot Nunatak and the northwest end of Quartermain Mountains. The descriptive names "South-West Arm" and "South Arm" were applied to this glacier and to the part of Ferrar Glacier south of Knobhead, respectively, by the BrnAE, 1901–04. Subsequent mapping has shown that the glacier described here is part of the Taylor Glacier system. Named by US-ACAN in 1992 after William A. Cassidy, Department of Geology and Planetary Science, University of Pittsburgh, who in 13 field seasons, 1976–90, led USARP teams in the investigation and collection of Antarctic meteorites from diverse sites through Victoria Land and southward to Lewis Cliff, adjacent to Queen Alexandra Range.

=== Fireman Glacier ===
77°47′S 160°16′E. A glacier in the west part of the Quartermain Mountains, flowing northwest into Cassidy Glacier. Named in 1992 by US-ACAN after Edward L. Fireman (d. 1990), physicist, Smithsonian Astrophysical Observatory, Cambridge, MA; authority on the analysis and dating of extraterrestrial materials and space debris; from 1979 conducted investigations on the dating and composition of Antarctic meteorites and Antarctic ice samples, including deep core ice obtained at Byrd Station.

=== Solitary Rocks ===
77°47′S 161°12′E. Mass of rocks immediately northwest of Cavendish Icefalls on the north side of the major bend in Taylor Glacier. The descriptive name was given by the BrNAE, 1901–04.

=== Pandora Spire ===
77°47′S 161°13′E. Sharply pointed feature, 1,670 metres (5,480 ft) high, the highest in the Solitary Rocks, on the north side of Taylor Glacier. Named by the New Zealand Geological Survey Antarctic Expedition (NZGSAE), 1957–58.

=== Cavendish Icefalls ===
77°49′S 161°20′E. An icefall in the Taylor Glacier between Solitary Rocks and Cavendish Rocks. Named by C.S. Wright, of the BrAE (1910–13), after the Cavendish Laboratory of Cambridge, England, where Wright did much of his research work.

=== Cavendish Rocks ===
77°50′S 161°24′E. Conspicuous bare rocks just south of Cavendish Icefalls in the middle of Taylor Glacier. Named by US-ACAN in 1964 after Cavendish Icefalls.

=== Simmons Basin ===
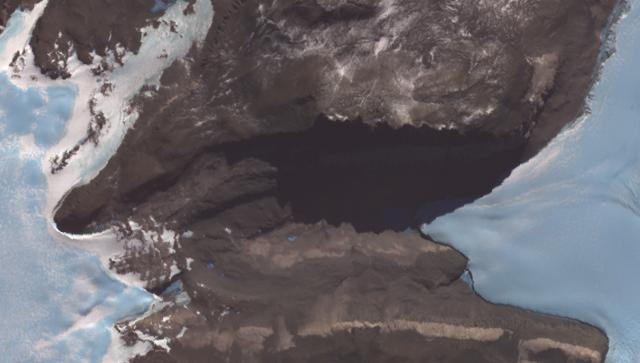
Satellite image of Simmons Basin

77°46′S 161°18′E. An ice-free basin, or valley, trending southeast between Solitary Rocks and Friis Hills, marginal to the north side of the bend of Taylor Glacier. The lower east end of the valley is occupied by Simmons Lake and a lobe of ice from Taylor Glacier. Named by US-ACAN in 1992 after George M. Simmons, Jr., biologist, Virginia Polytechnic Institute and State University, who in the decade following 1977, led several USARP teams in the study of Lakes Bonney, Fryxell, Hoare, Vanda, and other lakes of the McMurdo Dry Valleys.

=== Simmons Lake ===
77°46′S 161°20′E. A lake 1.5 nautical miles (2.8 km; 1.7 mi) long in the east part of Simmons Basin. Named by US-ACAN in 1992 in association with Simmons Basin after biologist George M. Simmons, Jr.

=== Friis Hills ===
77°45′S 161°25′E. A cluster of ice-free hills, 6 nautical miles (11 km; 6.9 mi) in extent and rising to 1,750 metres (5,740 ft), at the north side of the bend in Taylor Glacier. Named after geographer and archivist Herman R. Friis (1906–89), Director of the Center for Polar Archives in the National Archives; United States exchange scientist at the Japanese station East Ongul Island, 1969–70; member of US-ACAN, 1957–73.

=== Knobhead Moraine ===
77°51′S 161°36′E. A conspicuous moraine of large boulders to the north of Knobhead, Quartermain Mountains. It continues northward between Cavendish Rocks and the west end of Kukri Hills as a medial moraine in lower Taylor Glacier. The moraine was first observed by Lieutenant Albert B. Armitage, rnR, second in command of the BrnAE, 1901–04, who named it in association with Knobhead.

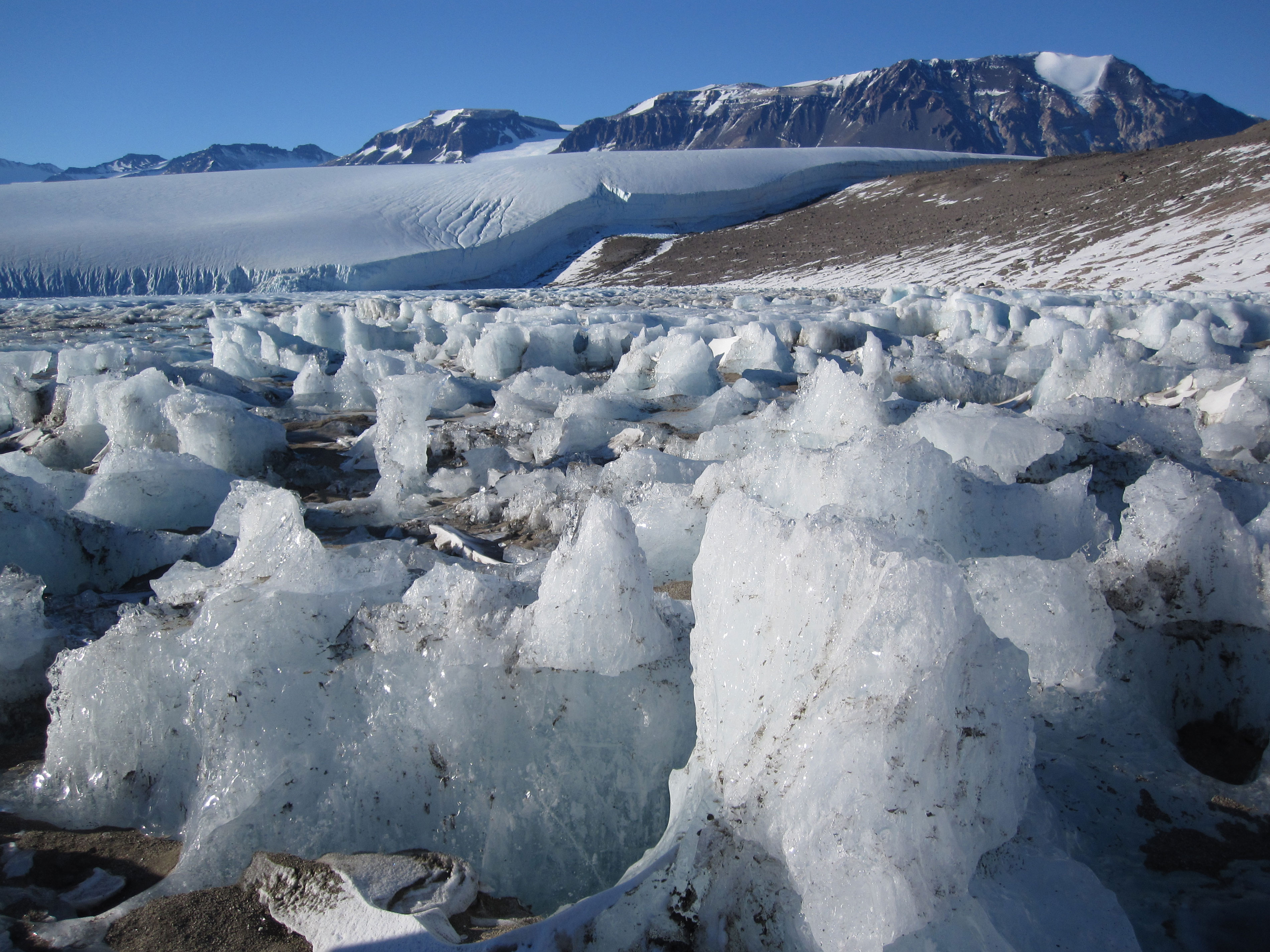
Lake Joyce is ice covered all year round, and the icy surface is constantly reshaped by wind, freezing and thawing.

=== Lake Joyce ===
77°43′S 161°37′E. A lake which lies along the northern side of Taylor Glacier in Pearse Valley. It is 0.5 nautical miles (0.93 km; 0.58 mi) long, 140 feet (43 m) deep and is covered by 22 feet (6.7 m) of very clear ice. The lake was studied by the New Zealand Victoria University of Wellington Antarctic Expedition (VUWAE) (1963–64) which named it after Ernest Joyce, a member of earlier British expeditions to the area led by Scott (1901–04) and Shackleton (1907–09).

=== Catspaw Glacier ===
77°43′S 161°42′E. Small alpine glacier just west of Stocking Glacier, flowing south from the slopes north of Taylor Glacier. So named by Taylor of the BrAE (1910–13) because of its resemblance to a cat's paw.

=== Stocking Glacier ===
77°42′S 161°50′E. Steep alpine glacier just east of Catspaw Glacier, flowing south toward Taylor Glacier. So named by Taylor of the BrAE (1910–13) for its appearance as seen from above.

=== Plummet Glacier ===
77°47′S 161°54′E. The westernmost glacier on the north side of Kukri Hills, flowing north to Taylor Glacier. The name is one of a group in the area associated with surveying applied in 1993 by NZGB. The name refers to a plummet, or plumb bob.

=== Calkin Glacier ===
77°46′S 162°17′E. Glacier just west of Sentinel Peak, flowing north from the Kukri Hills toward the terminus of Taylor Glacier. Charted by the BrAE under Scott, 1910–13. Named by the US-ACAN for Parker Calkin, USARP geologist who made investigations in the area during 1960–61 and 1961–62.

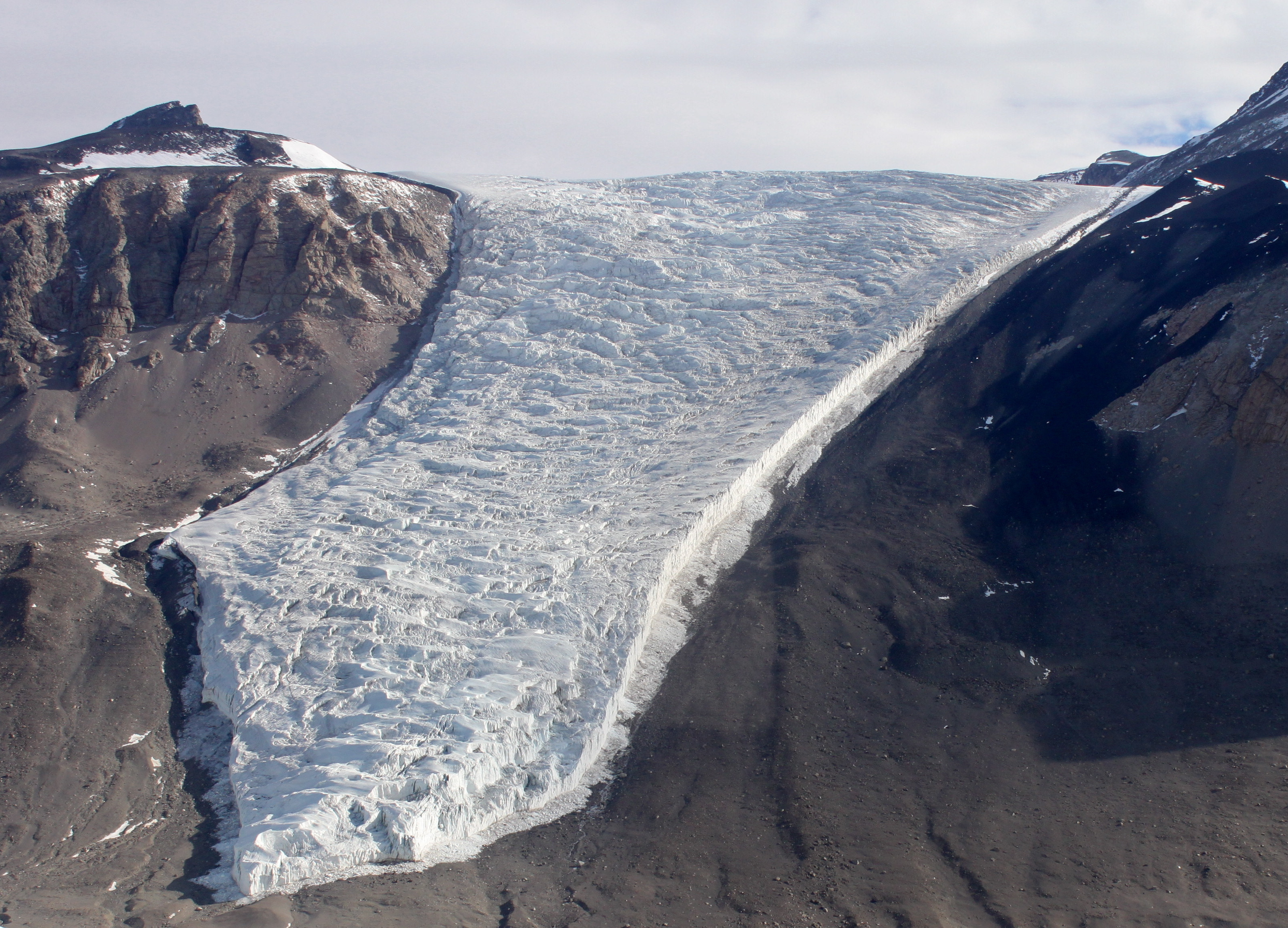
Rhone Glacier 2009

=== Rhone Glacier ===
77°42′S 162°14′E. Glacier lying west of Matterhorn Glacier and flowing south toward the junction of Lake Bonney and Taylor Glacier. Charted and named by the BrAE under Scott, 1910–13.

=== Blood Falls ===
An outflow of an iron oxide–tainted plume of saltwater, flowing from the tongue of Taylor Glacier onto the ice-covered surface of Lake Bonney in the Taylor Valley. The reddish deposit was found in 1911 by the Australian geologist Thomas Griffith Taylor, who first explored the valley that bears his name.

== Sources ==
- Alberts, Fred G., ed. (1995), Geographic Names of the Antarctic (PDF) (2 ed.), United States Board on Geographic Names This article incorporates public domain material from websites or documents of the United States Board on Geographic Names.
- Ross Island, USGS: United States Geological Survey
- Taylor Glacier, USGS: United States Geological Survey

This article incorporates public domain material from websites or documents of the United States Geological Survey.
