= Wilkniss Mountains =

Mountain range in Victoria Land, Antarctica

- Location within Antarctica

Geography
- Continent: Antarctica
- Range coordinates: 78°1′S 161°7′E

The Wilkniss Mountains (78°1′S 161°7′E) form a prominent group of conical peaks and mountains, 10 nautical miles (19 km) long running north–south, located 9 nautical miles (17 km; 10 mi) east-southeast of Mount Feather in the Quartermain Mountains, Victoria Land, Antarctica. The mountains are 3 nautical miles (5.6 km; 3.5 mi) wide in the north portion where Mount Blackwelder, 2,340 metres (7,680 ft) high, and Pivot Peak 2,450 metres (8,040 ft) high, rise above ice-free valleys. Except for an outlying southwest peak, the south portion narrows to a series of mainly ice-covered smaller peaks.

== Name ==
The Wilkniss Mountains were named by United States Advisory Committee on Antarctic Names (US-ACAN) in 1992 after Peter E. Wilkniss, a chemist who from 1975 has served in various positions at the National Science Foundation, including Deputy Assistant Director of the Directorate for Scientific, Technological, and International Affairs; Director, Division of Polar Programs, 1984–93; senior science associate to the assistant director for Geosciences, from 1993.

== Location ==
The Wilkniss Mountains are south of the Knobhead massif, the southeastern part of the Quartermain Mountains. They are separated from Knobhead by the Ferrar Glacier, which flows east from its head near Mount Blackwelder. The Palais Glacier (78°02′S 161°19′E) is a broad glacier, about 8 nautical miles (15 km; 9.2 mi) long, that flows north between Wilkniss Mountains and the Colwell Massif to enter Ferrar Glacier near its head. The Wilkniss Mountains are east of The Portal and Portal Mountain. Rampart Ridge is to the south.

== Glaciology ==
There is a glacial drift deposit with a terminal moraine 1 to 4 metres (3 ft 3 in to 13 ft 1 in) high in Vernier Valley at an elevation of 1,400 to 1,500 metres (4,600 to 4,900 ft), one of four moraines deposited by ice flowing from the Ferrar Glacier into the valley. The Ferrar drifts have ages around 4.0–3.4 million years, 1.2 million years, 700 thousand years and 50 thousand years. This stability of ice surface elevation suggests that over the last 4 million years the upland regions of the McMurdo Dry Valleys have experienced minimal climatic amelioration.

== Features ==
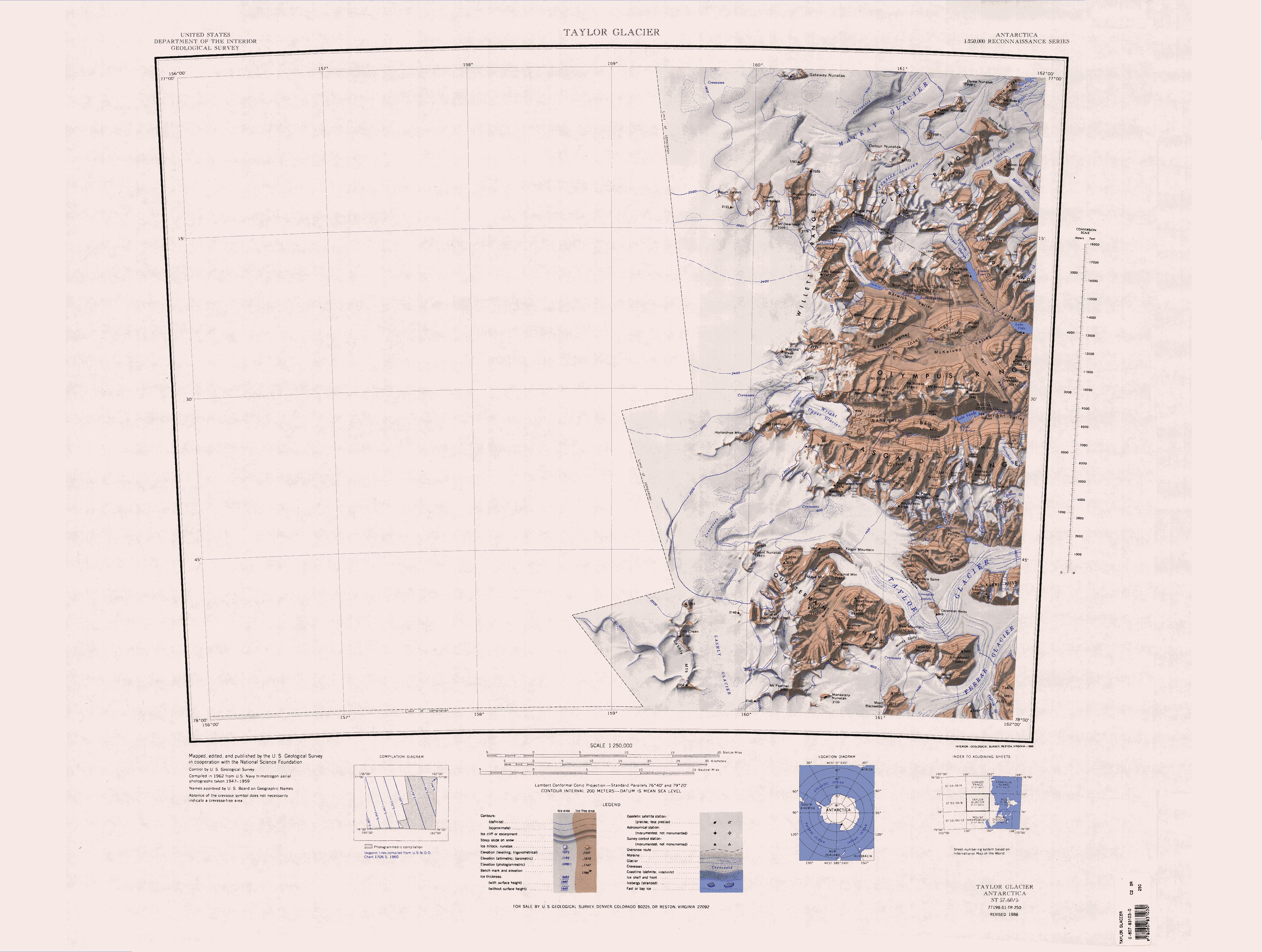
Mount Blackwelder in southeast of map

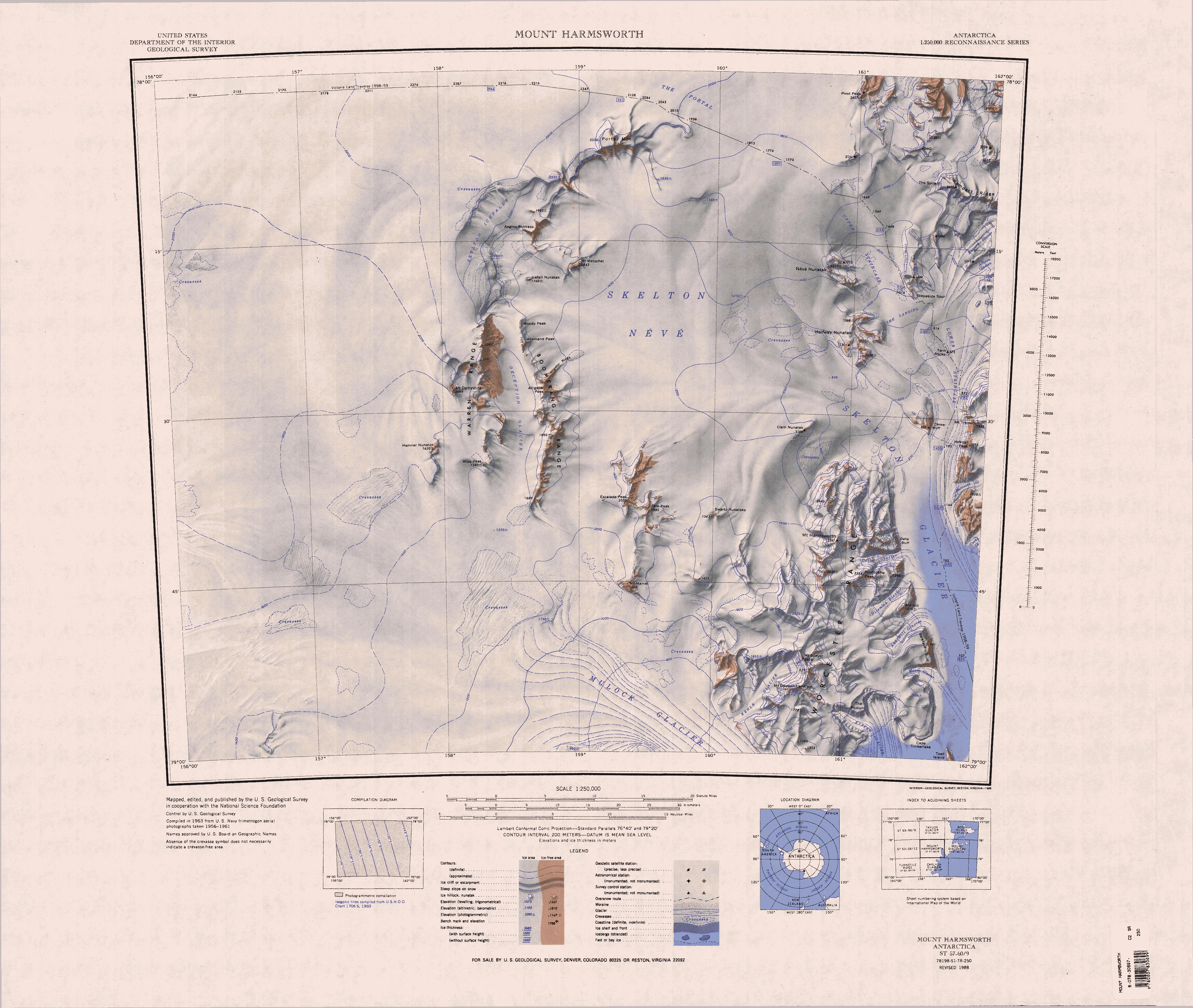
Pivot Peak in northeast of map

Features include:

=== Vernier Valley ===
77°58′S 161°09′E. An ice-free valley on the east side of Mount Blackwelder in the northeast part of Wilkniss Mountains, Victoria Land. The name is one of a group in the area associated with surveying applied in 1993 by NZGB; vernier being a graduated scale used on measuring instruments to allow the reading of finer subdivisions.

=== Mount Blackwelder ===
77°59′S 161°04′E. A sharp, mainly ice-free peak in north Wilkniss Mountains, rising to 2,340 metres (7,680 ft) west of Vernier Valley and 6 nautical miles (11 km; 6.9 mi) north of Pivot Peak. Mapped by USGS from surveys and United States Navy aerial photographs, 1947–59. Named by US-ACAN in 1984 after Lieutenant Commander Billy G. Blackwelder, United States Navy, Senior Helicopter Pilot, Antarctic Development Squadron Six (VXE-6), United States Navy OpDFrz, 1971–72 and 1975–77.

=== Canoe Nunatak ===
77°59′S 161°16′E. A nunatak, 1 nautical mile (1.9 km; 1.2 mi) long and 0.2 nautical miles (0.37 km; 0.23 mi) wide, located 2.2 nautical miles (4.1 km; 2.5 mi) east-southeast of Mount Blackwelder. The distinctive shape resembles an upturned canoe. Named by Alan Sherwood, NZGS party leader in the area, 1987–88.

=== Creagh Glacier ===
78°01′S 161°10′E. Glacier, 4 nautical miles (7.4 km; 4.6 mi) long, flowing northeast from Creagh Icefall to the vicinity of Canoe Nunatak. Named by US-ACAN in 1994 after Father Gerry Creagh (d. 1994), a New Zealand citizen, who served as honorary United States Navy chaplain for over 25 summer seasons at the Chapel of the Snows, McMurdo Station. He was unofficially known as the "Chaplain of Antarctica."

=== Creagh Icefall ===
78°02′S 161°08′E. Icefall at the head of Creagh Glacier. Named by US-ACAN in 1994 in association with Creagh Glacier.

=== Lever Nunataks ===
78.0666667°S 161.1333333°E. A chain of nunataks that extend southeastward from Fulcrum and the head of Creagh Glacier. The name is suggested by the position and linear arrangement of the group away from Fulcrum. Named by New Zealand Geographic Board (NZGB) in 1994.

=== Fulcrum ===
78.032125°S 161.123654°E. A peaked nunatak rising to about 2,000 metres (6,600 ft) at the north end of Lever Nunataks. The position of the nunatak suggests a fulcrum upon which Lever Nunataks act. Named by the New Zealand Geographic Board (NZGB) in 1994.

=== Buttress Nunatak ===
78.023958°S 161.219589°E. A nunatak rising to 2,175 metres (7,136 ft) at the east side of the head of Creagh Glacier. So named by New Zealand Geographic Board (NZGB) (1994) because a buttress spur on the east side of the nunatak leads to the summit.

=== Pivot Peak ===
78°02′S 161°01′E. Prominent conical peak, 2,470 metres (8,100 ft) high, distinguished by a large northeast cirque and as the highest point in Wilkniss Mountains. The New Zealand Northern Survey Party of the CTAE (1956–58) established a survey station on its summit on January 21, 1958. So named by them because its prominent appearance and location make it the focal point of the topography in that area.

=== Level Valley ===
77°59′S 161°08′E. A distinctive ice-free valley which descends northeastward from the Pivot Peak cirque, in Wilkniss Mountains, Victoria Land. One of a group of names in the area associated with surveying applied in 1993 by NZGB. A surveyors level is an instrument designed primarily to funish a horizontal line of sight.

== Sources ==
- Alberts, Fred G., ed. (1995), Geographic Names of the Antarctic (PDF) (2 ed.), United States Board on Geographic Names This article incorporates public domain material from websites or documents of the United States Board on Geographic Names.
- "Buttress Nunatak", Geographic Names Information System, United States Geological Survey, United States Department of the Interior
- Florindo, Fabio; Siegert, Martin; De Santis, Laura; Naish, Tim (2021), Antarctic Climate Evolution, Elsevier, ISBN 978-0-12-819110-1
- "Fulcrum", Geographic Names Information System, United States Geological Survey, United States Department of the Interior
- "Lever Nunataks", Geographic Names Information System, United States Geological Survey, United States Department of the Interior
- Mount Harmsworth, USGS: United States Geological Survey
- Staiger, J.W.; Marchant, D.R.; Schaefer, J.M.; Oberholzer, P.; Johnson, J.V.; Lewis, A.R.; Swanger, K.M. (2006), "Plio-Pleistocene history of Ferrar Glacier, Antarctica: Implications for climate and ice sheet stability", Earth and Planetary Science Letters, 243, Elsevier: 489–503
- Taylor Glacier, USGS: United States Geological Survey

This article incorporates public domain material from websites or documents of the United States Geological Survey.
