= Mount Weller (Victoria Land) =

Mountain in Ross Dependency, Antarctica

Coordinates: 77°51′S 160°29′E

- Location within Antarctica

Highest point
- Elevation: 2,420 m (7,940 ft)

Mount Weller is a peak (2,420 m) rising above the west side of Beacon Valley, 4 nautical miles (7 km) southwest of Pyramid Mountain, in Quartermain Mountains, Victoria Land, Antarctica. It is also 90 miles (140 km) due west of McMurdo Station. The name appears to be first used on a 1961 New Zealand Lands and Survey Department map compiled from New Zealand field surveys, 1957–60, and U.S. Navy aerial photographs of that period. Presumably named after William J. Weller, Royal Navy, a seaman of the ship RSS Discovery. In November 1903, Weller and Thomas Kennar (Kennar Valley, q.v.) accompanied Hartley T. Ferrar in the first geological reconnaissance of Quartermain Mountains.

The mountain consists of the lower Permian Metschel Tillite (evidence of the Late Paleozoic icehouse) overlaid by fossil-rich Devonian Aztec Siltstone like much of the Beacon Supergroup. This in turn is covered by an exposed layer of feldspathic to quartzitic sandstone unusually rich in coal, which lends its name to the extensive Weller Sandstone. This deposit was renamed the Weller Coal Measures in 1969.
