= Schulz Crag =

Rock summit in Antarctica

Schulz Crag (78°23′S 161°11′E) is a 1110 m tall rock summit in eastern Halfway Nunatak named after Thomas J. Schulz, United States Geological Survey (USGS) cartographer; member of the 1982–83 geodetic control team in the McMurdo Dry Valleys, the first joint US-NZ cooperative effort to establish mapping control in order to map the entire region at 1:50,000 scale.
