= Baumann Crag =

Mountain in Ross Dependency, Antarctica

Baumann Crag (78°24′S 161°5′E) is a rock crag rising to 1,265 metres (4,150 ft) and forming the south end of Halfway Nunatak, Victoria Land. It was named by the Advisory Committee on Antarctic Names in 1994 after Christopher C. Baumann, United States Geological Survey (USGS) cartographer; member of the satellite surveying team at South Pole Station, winter party 1984; leader of the USGS mapping control field team on Seymour Island, summer season, 1992–93.
