= Quartermain Mountains =

Mountains in Antarctica

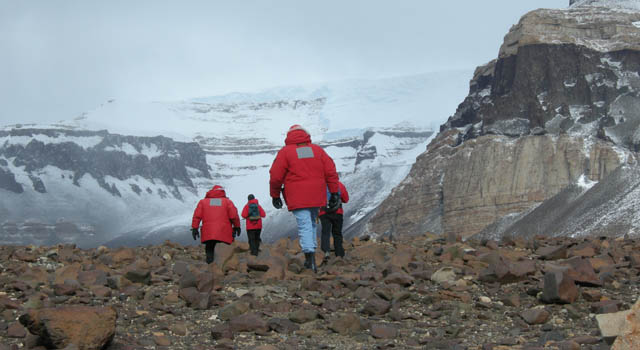
- Antarctica's Beacon Valley, one of the most Mars-like places on Earth

Geography
- Location within Antarctica
- Continent: Antarctica
- Range coordinates: 77°51′S 160°45′E
- Borders on: Lashly Mountains, Asgard Range and Royal Society Range

The Quartermain Mountains ( 77°51′S 160°45′E) are a group of exposed mountains in Antarctica, about 20 nautical miles (37 km; 23 mi) long, typical of ice-free features of the McMurdo Dry Valleys, Victoria Land. They are east of the Lashly Mountains, south of the Asgard Range, west of the Kukri Hills and Royal Society Range, and some distance north of the Worcester Range.

== Exploration ==
The Quartermain Mountains were visited by British expeditions led by Robert Falcon Scott (1901–04 and 1910–13) and Ernest Shackleton (1907–09), who applied several names. Names were added in the years subsequent to the International Geophysical Year, 1957–58, concurrent with research carried out by New Zealand Antarctic Research Programme (NZARP) and United States Antarctic Research Program (USARP) field parties, and to fulfill the requirement for maps compiled from United States Navy aerial photographs, 1947–83. In 1977, the New Zealand Antarctic Place-Names Committee named the mountains after New Zealand Antarctic historian Lester Bowden Quartermain (1895–1973).

== Location ==
The Quartermain Mountains are east of the Lashly Mountains, from which they are separated by the Lashly Glacier. The Portal and Pivot Peak are to the southwest. The Ferrar Glacier runs along the southeast boundary, and the Taylor Glacier runs along the north and northeast boundary. The Quartermain Mountains are bounded by Finger Mountain, Mount Handsley, Mount Feather and Tabular Mountain; also including Knobhead, Terra Cotta Mountain, New Mountain, Beacon Heights, Pyramid Mountain, Arena Valley, Kennar Valley, Turnabout Valley and the several valleys and ridges within Beacon Valley.

== Glaciers ==
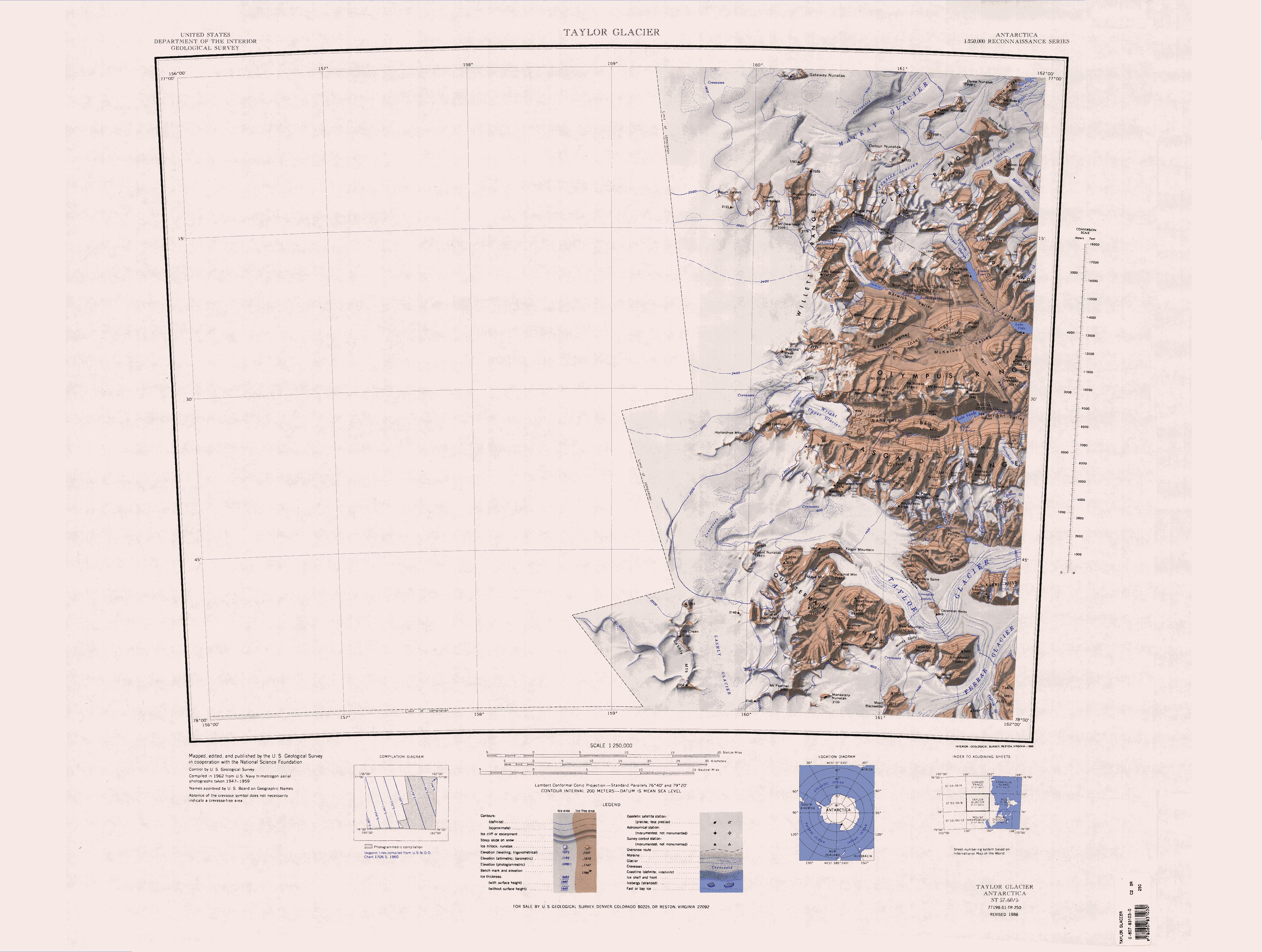
Quartermain Mountains in southeast of map

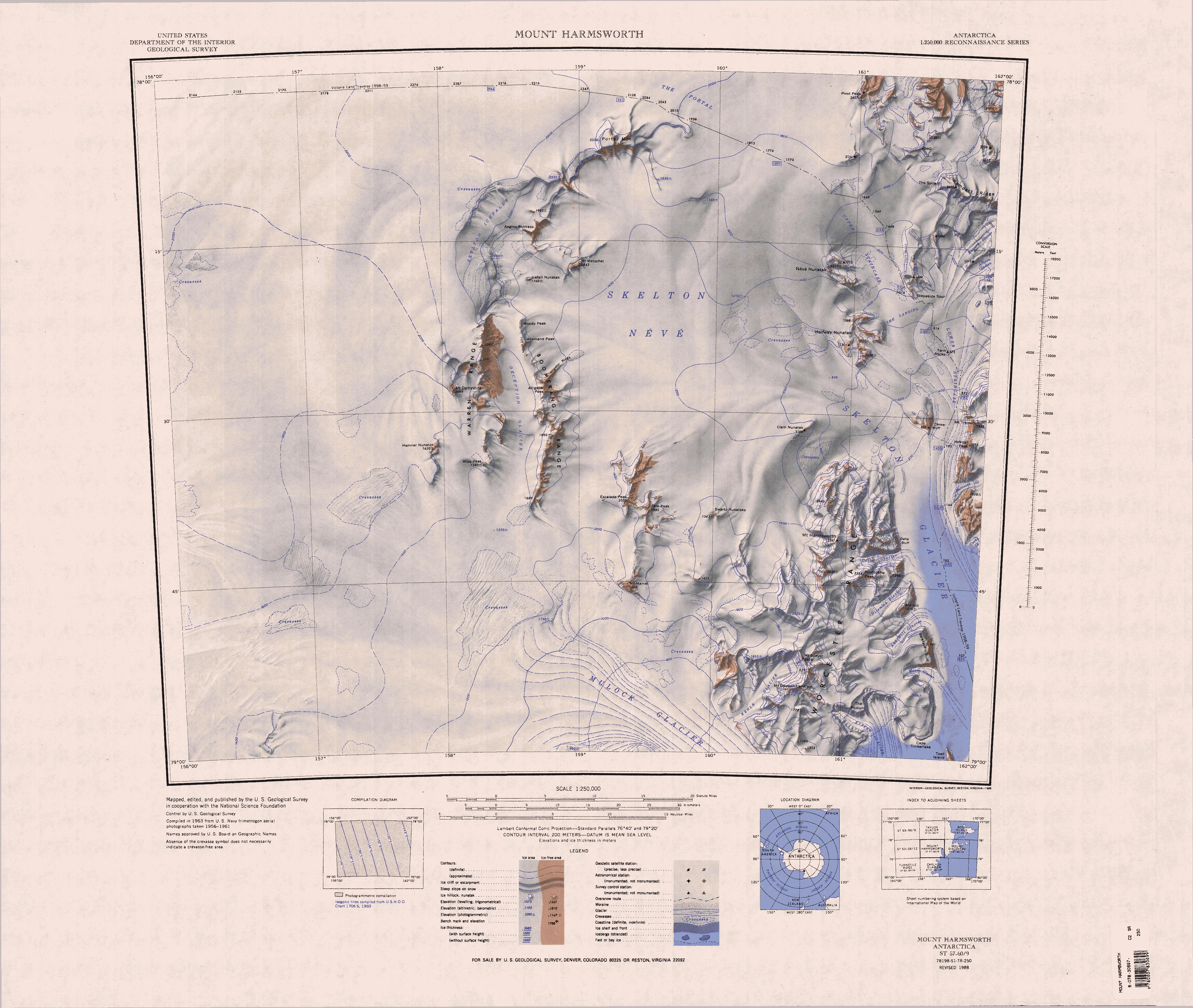
Region to the south of the Quartermain Mountains

=== Telemeter Glacier ===
77°48′S 160°12′E. A small glacier 1 nautical mile (1.9 km; 1.2 mi) southwest of Fireman Glacier in the west part of the Quartermain Mountains. The name is one of a group in the area associated with surveying applied in 1993 by NZGB; telemeter being an instrument used to ascertain ranges and distances.

=== Turnabout Glacier ===
77°46′S 160°43′E. A glacier to the south of Finger Mountain, occupying the east half of Turnabout Valley, the west part being ice free. Named in 1992 by US-ACAN in association with Turnabout Valley.

== Valleys ==
Some of the McMurdo Dry Valleys are found in the Quartermain Mountains. Valleys include Turnabout Valley, Beacon Valley, University Valley, Farnell Valley, Brawhm Pass, Ashtray Basin and Arena Valley.

=== Subtense Valley ===
77°50′S 160°06′E. A mostly ice-free valley, 1.5 nautical miles (2.8 km; 1.7 mi) long, located 2 nautical miles (3.7 km; 2.3 mi) northwest of Tabular Mountain in the west extremity of the Quartermain Mountains. The name is one of a group in the area associated with surveying applied in 1993 by the New Zealand Geographic Board (NZGB). A subtense bar is a fixed base, usually 2 metres (6 ft 7 in) long, used in conjunction with a theodolite in the calculation of horizontal distance.

=== Kennar Valley ===
77°46′S 160°25′E. A small valley, ice free except for a lobe of ice marginal to Taylor Glacier at the mouth, located west of Finger Mountain. The name appears to be first used on a 1961 New Zealand Lands and Survey Department map compiled from New Zealand field surveys, 1957-60, and United States Navy aerial photographs of that period. Presumably named after Thomas Kennar, Royal Navy, Petty Officer on the Discovery during the British National Antarctic Expedition (BrNAE), 1901-04, led by R.F. Scott. In November 1903, Kennar and William J. Weller (see Mount Weller) accompanied Hartley T. Ferrar in the first geological reconnaissance of the Quartermain Mountains.

=== Turnabout Valley ===
77°46′S 160°32′E. A partially deglaciated valley between Finger Mountain and Pyramid Mountain. Named by the VUWAE, 1958-59.

=== Friedmann Valley ===
77°54′S 160°30′E. One of the McMurdo Dry Valleys, located west of Rector Ridge at the head of Beacon Valley. Named in 1992 by the United States Advisory Committee on Antarctic Names (US-ACAN) after E. Imre Friedmann, biologist, Polar Desert Research Center, Florida State University, who in virtually every austral summer, 1976-87, led USARP field parties in the study of microorganisms in rocks of the McMurdo Dry Valleys. His wife, Roseli Ocampo-Friedmann, was a member of the field party in the last four seasons.

=== Beacon Valley ===
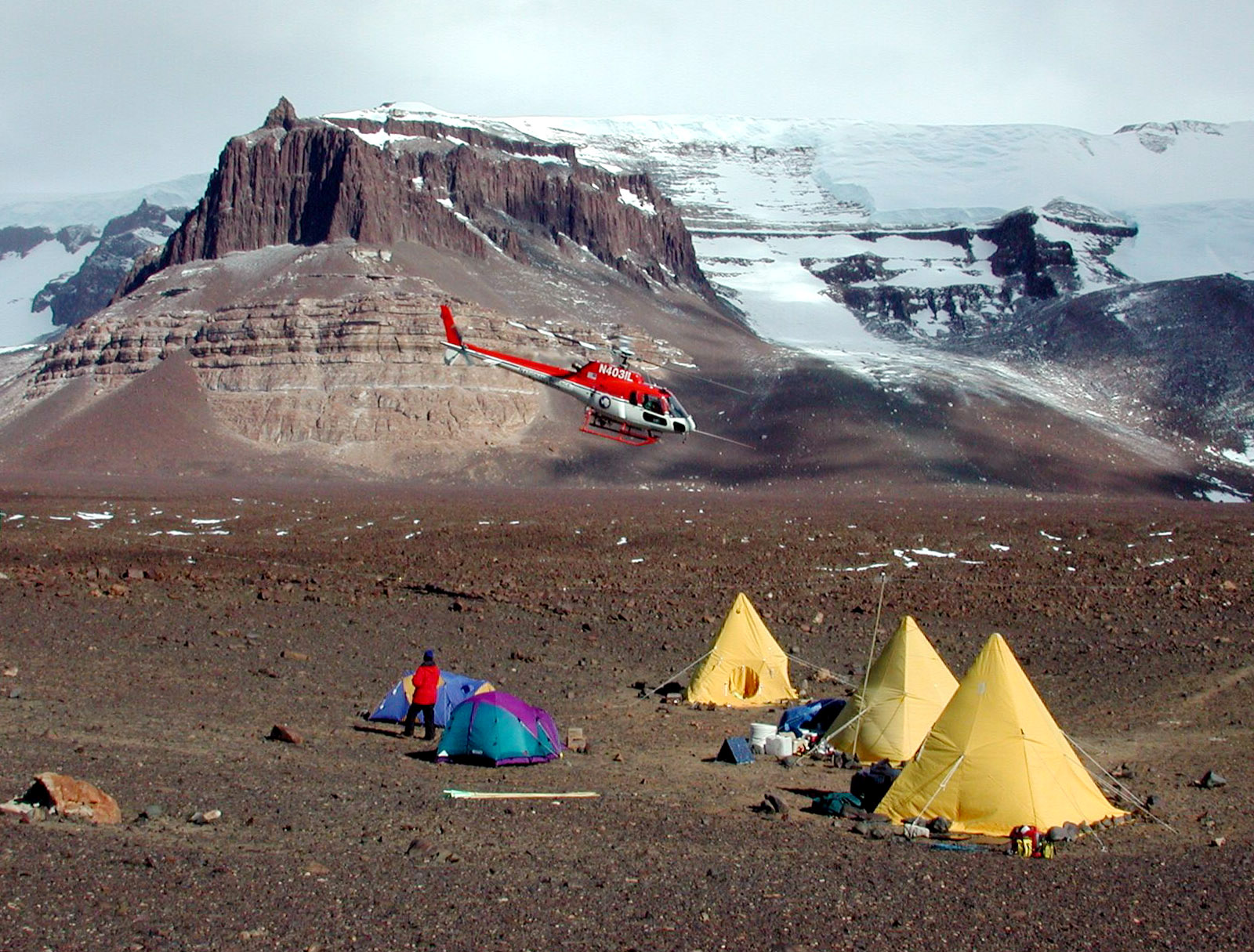
A helicopter prepares to land at Beacon Valley

77°49′S 160°39′E. An ice-free valley between Pyramid Mountain and Beacon Heights. Mapped by the British Antarctic Expedition, 1910–13. Named by the VUWAE (1958-59) after Beacon Heights.

=== Mullins Valley ===
77°54′S 160°35′E. One of the McMurdo Dry Valleys, situated between Rector Ridge and Vestal Ridge in the southeast part of Beacon Valley. Named by the US-ACAN in 1992 after Jerry L. Mullins, cartographer, USGS, from 1978; Manager of Polar Programs, Office of International Activities, United States Geological Survey (USGS), from 1989; six field seasons in Antarctica managing the acquisition of aerial photography, 1982-83 to 1993-94; Member, United States Advisory Committee on Antarctic Names, from 1994.

=== University Valley ===
77°52′S 160°40′E. A valley about 1 nautical mile (1.9 km; 1.2 mi) long, lying next northeast of Farnell Valley in the Beacon Valley area. Named in January 1962 by United States Antarctic Research Program (USARP) researchers Heinz Janetschek and Fiorenzo Ugolini after their respective university affiliation, Leopold-FranzensUniversitat at Innsbruck, Austria, and Rutgers University at New Brunswick, New Jersey.

=== Farnell Valley ===
77°53′S 160°39′E. An ice-free valley, 1 nautical mile (1.9 km; 1.2 mi) long, a tributary to Beacon Valley, descending to the latter from the southeast side. Named by US-ACAN in 1964, for James B.H. Farnell, who assisted in supplying field parties at McMurdo Station, 1960.

=== Brawhm Pass ===
77°53′S 160°41′E. A small pass on the east side of Farnell Valley. The pass provides easy passage between Beacon Valley and Arena Valley. The name was recommended in 1968 by the NZ-APC. It is derived from the names of six party members of the University of New South Wales (Australia) expeditions of 1964-65 and 1966-67 who used this pass (e.g., Bryan, Rose, Anderson, Williams, Hobbs and McElroy).

=== Ashtray Basin ===
77°52′S 160°58′E. A small basin near the head of Arena Valley. Named by a field party of the University of New South Wales that worked in this area in 1966-67. The name is reported to be descriptive of characteristic formations on the site.

=== Arena Valley ===
77°50′S 160°59′E. An ice-free valley, between East Beacon and New Mountain, which opens to the south side of Taylor Glacier. Given this descriptive name by the VUWAE, 1958-59.

=== Windy Gully ===
77°52′S 161°12′E. An ice-filled gully between New Mountain and Terra Cotta Mountain, on the south side of Taylor Glacier. Named by the Western Journey Party, led by Taylor, of the BrAE, 1910-13. All parties in this area have commented on the incidence of high winds here.

=== Gusty Gully ===
77°54′S 161°28′E. A small N-S valley, the upper portion of which is occupied by a glacier, between Mount Kuipers and Knobhead. So named by Alan Sherwood, NZGS party leader to the area, 1987-88, from the strong winds observed here, similar to Windy Gully located 3 nautical miles (5.6 km; 3.5 mi) to the west.

=== Handsley Valley ===
77°55′S 161°36′E. A small ice-free valley between Knobhead and Mount Handsley. Named by NZGB in 1993 in association with Mount Handsley.

== Other features ==
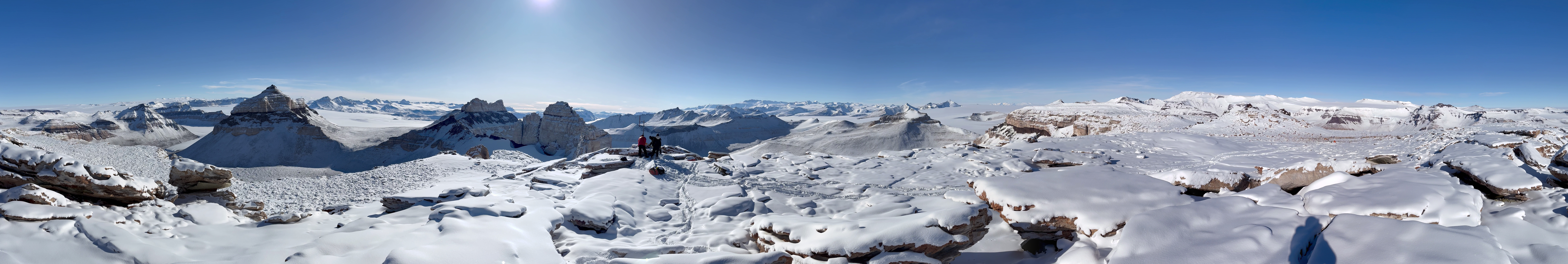
Quartermain Mountains from South Beacon ridge

Other features include Tabular Mountain, Mount Feather, Maya Mountain, Finger Mountain, Pyramid Mountain, Aztec Mountain, West Beacon, East Beacon, University Peak, Altar Mountain and New Mountain.

=== Tabular Mountain ===
77°52′S 160°14′E. A broad, flat-topped mountain, 2,740 metres (8,990 ft) high, about 6 nautical miles (11 km; 6.9 mi) north-northwest of Mount Feather. Descriptively named by the BrNAE, 1901-04.

=== Horizon Bluff ===
77°54′S 160°26′E. A steep bluff at the head of Beacon Valley, rising to 2,275 metres (7,464 ft) to the west of Friedmann Valley. One of a group of names in the area associated with surveying applied in 1993 by NZGB; horizon being the line of sight described by level line of theodolite or level.

=== Profile Bluff ===
77°52′S 160°26′E. A prominent bluff 2,070 metres (6,790 ft) high midway between Mount Weller and Horizon Bluff on the west side of Beacon Valley. The name is one of a group in the area associated with surveying applied in 1993 by the NZGB.

=== Mount Weller ===
77°51′S 160°29′E. A peak 2,420 metres (7,940 ft) high rising above the west side of Beacon Valley, 4 nautical miles (7.4 km; 4.6 mi) southwest of Pyramid Mountain. The name appears to be first used on a 1961 N.Z. Lands and Survey Department map compiled from N.Z. field surveys, 1957-60, and United States Navy aerial photographs of that period. Presumably named after William J. Weller, Royal Navy, a seaman of the ship Discovery during the BrNAE, 1901-04, led- by R.F. Scott. In November 1903, Weller and Thomas Kennar (see Kennar Valley) accompanied Hartley T. Ferrar in the first geological reconnaissance of the Quartermain Mountains.

=== Mount Feather ===
77°57′S 160°21′E. A massive mountain, 3,010 m, with a broad flattish summit, standing at the south extremity of the Quartermain Mountains. Named after Thomas A. Feather, Royal Navy, Boatswain on the Discovery during the BrNAE (1901-04), who accompanied Scott in his Western Journey to this area in 1903.

=== Siple Ridge ===
77°56′S 160°08′E. A 2,570 metres (8,430 ft) high ridge, 3 nautical miles (5.6 km; 3.5 mi) long and 0.5 nautical miles (0.93 km; 0.58 mi) wide, being the more northern of two ridges that extend west from the Mount Feather block. The narrow upper surface is capped by ice but rock is exposed at many points along abrupt cliffs. Named by US-ACAN in 1992 after Ruth J. Siple, widow of renowned Antarctican Paul A. Siple (see Mount Siple); Honorary President and active supporter of The Antarctican Society; Honored Guest at the dedication of the new United States Amundsen-Scott South Pole Station at the site on January 9, 1975.

=== Nadir Bluff ===
77°58′S 160°27′E. A bluff 2,355 metres (7,726 ft) high which forms a shoulderlike projection from the east side of Mount Feather. One of a group of names in the area associated with surveying applied in 1993 by NZGB; nadir being opposite of zenith and the direction of gravity as defined by a plumb line.

=== Maya Mountain ===
77°47′S 160°33′E. A small pyramidal mountain, about 2,000 metres (6,600 ft) high, between Aztec Mountain and Pyramid Mountain, just south of Taylor Glacier. So named by the NZGSAE (1958-59) because its shape resembles the pyramidal ceremonial platforms used by the Mayan civilization.

=== Finger Mountain ===
77°45′S 160°40′E. An elongated mountain rising to 1,920 metres (6,300 ft) on the north side of Turnabout Valley. So named by the BrNAE (1901-04) because a long tongue of dolerite between the sandstone strata has the appearance of a finger.

=== Pyramid Mountain ===
77°47′S 160°40′E. A mountain resembling a pyramid, rising to 2,120 metres (6,960 ft) between Turnabout Valley and the mouth of Beacon Valley. The name seems first to appear on maps of the BrAE (R.F. Scott), 1910-13, but the mountain was almost certainly seen for the first time during Scott's first expedition, 1901-04.

=== Aztec Mountain ===
77°48′S 160°31′E. A small pyramidal mountain over 2,000 m, just southwest of Maya Mountain and west of Beacon Valley. So named by the NZGSAE (1958-59) because its shape resembles the pyramidal ceremonial platforms used by the Aztec and Maya civilizations.

=== Rector Ridge ===
77°54′S 160°33′E. A bold rock ridge at the head of Beacon Valley, rising to 2,105 metres (6,906 ft) between Friedmann Valley and Mullins Valley. Named in 1992 by US-ACAN after Commander Jack Rector, United States Navy, Commanding Officer, Antarctic Development Squadron Six (VXE-6), May 1987 to May 1988.

=== Vestal Ridge ===
77°53′S 160°38′E. A steep rock ridge in southeast Beacon Valley, rising to 2,240 metres (7,350 ft) and forming the divide between Mullins Valley and Farnell Valley. Named by US-ACAN in 1993 after J. Robie Vestal (1942-92), microbiologist at the University of Cincinnati, 1983-92; chairman of the advisory committee to the Division of Polar Programs, National Science Foundation, 1990-91. His research in Antarctica focused on adaptations of microbial ecosystems to the extreme environments.

=== Beacon Heights ===
77°50′S 160°50′E. A small cluster of peaks between Beacon Valley and Arena Valley, rising to 2,345 metres (7,694 ft) in West Beacon, and also including East Beacon and South Beacon. Named by Hartley J. Ferrar, geologist with the BrNAE (1901-04), after the beacon sandstone which caps these heights.

=== West Beacon ===
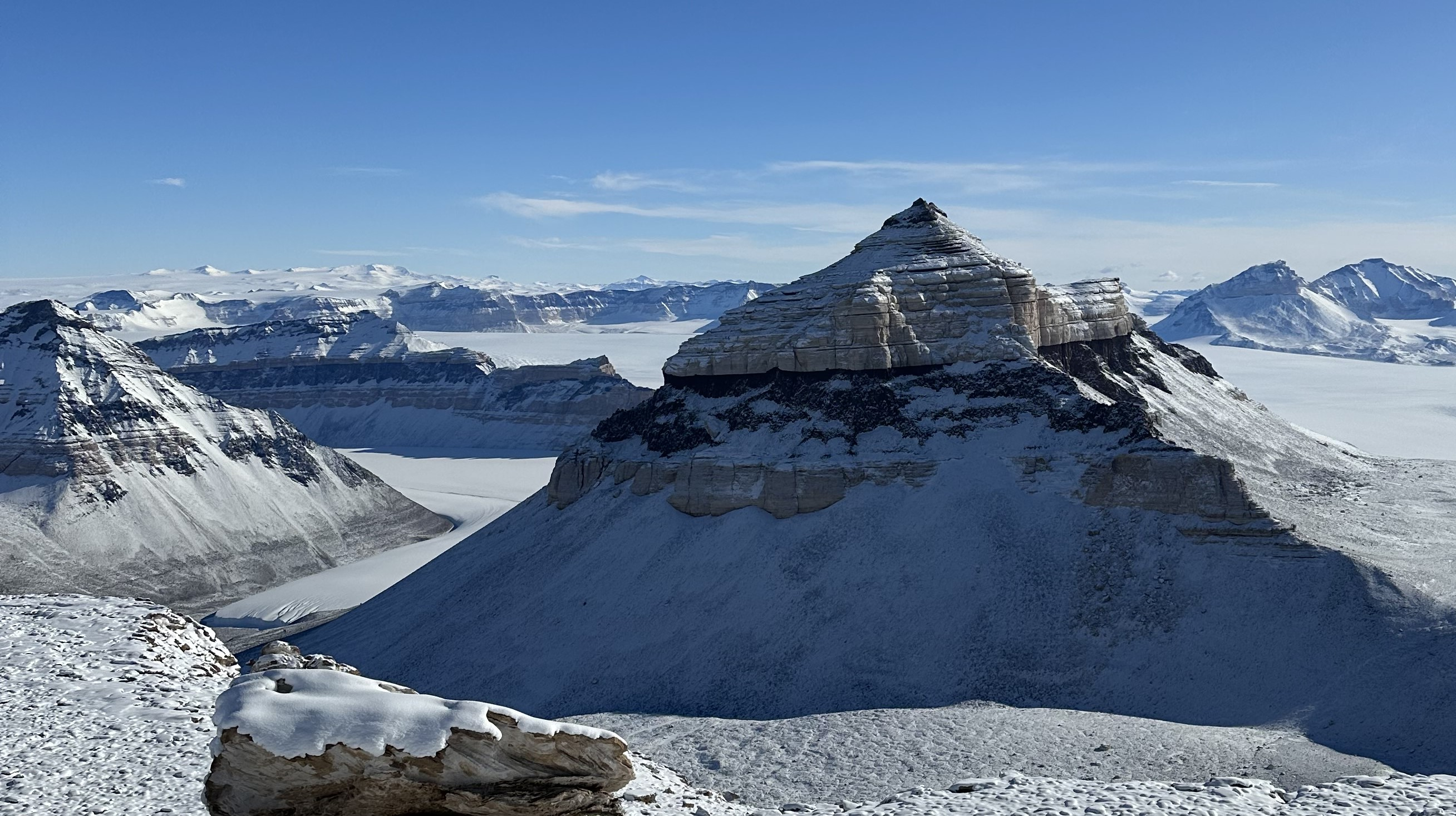
West Beacon from South Beacon ridgeline

77°49′S 160°48′E. The prominent western peak, rising to 2,345 metres (7,694 ft) in Beacon Heights. The name "Beacon Height West" was first used by the BrNAE (1901-04). The name was shortened by the NZGSAE, 1958-59.

=== East Beacon ===
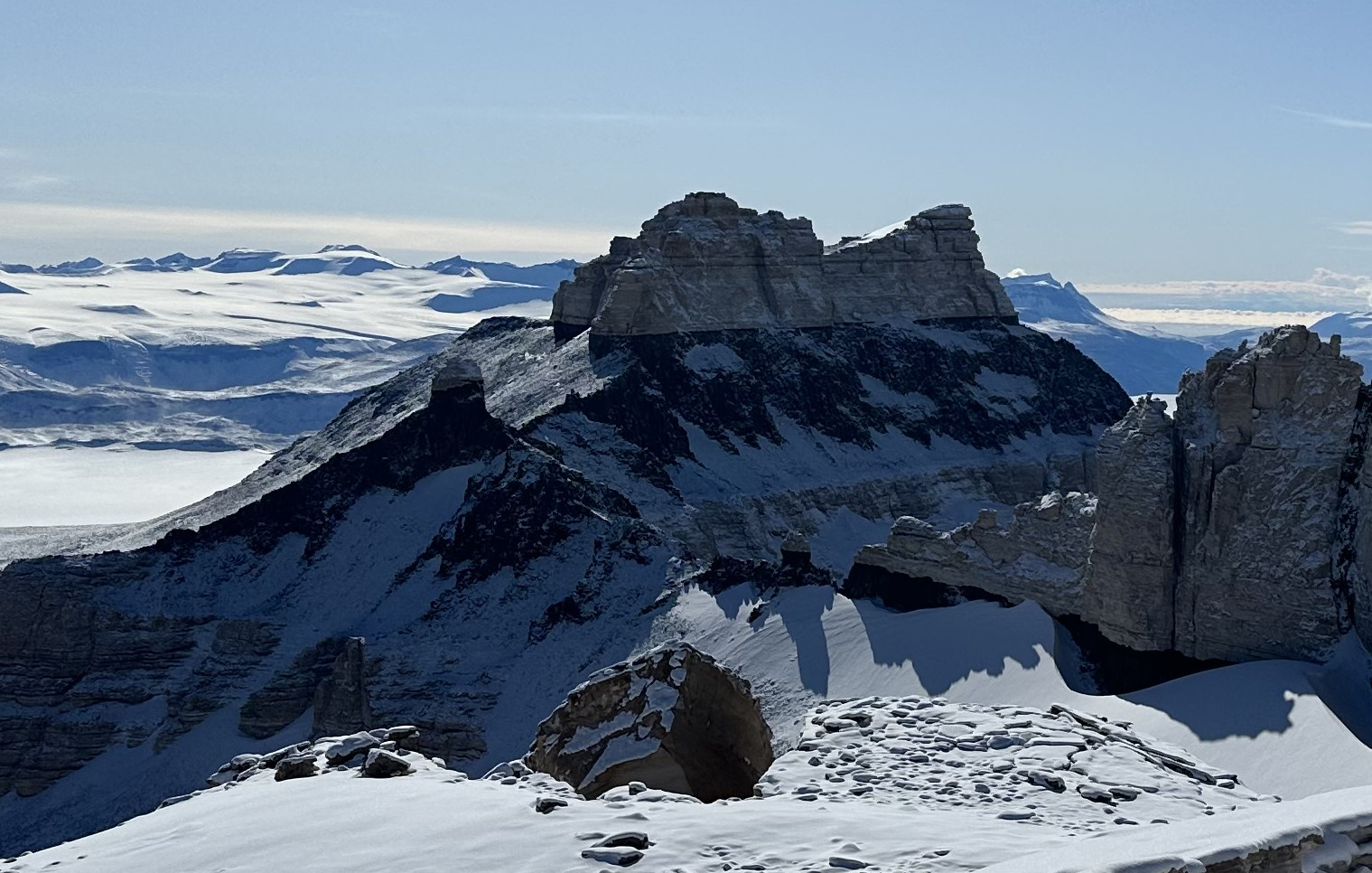
East Beacon from South Beacon ridgeline

77°50′S 160°52′E. The prominent eastern peak, rising to 2,265 metres (7,431 ft) in Beacon Heights. Named East Beacon by the NZGSAE, 1958-59.

=== Black Face ===
77°51′S 160°53′E. The south wall of an east–west ridge in Arena Valley, 1 nautical mile (1.9 km; 1.2 mi) south of East Beacon. The feature is a prominent landmark and is formed by a dolerite dike which rises over 300 metres (980 ft) above the floor of the valley. Named by NZ-APC from the color of the rock following geological work in the area by C.T. McElroy, G. Rose, and K.J. Whitby in 1980-81.

=== South Beacon ===
77°51′S 160°47′E. The summit of a bold, flat-topped ridge rising to 2,210 metres (7,250 ft) in the south part of Beacon Heights. A ridge system connects South Beacon with West Beacon, 1.5 nautical miles (2.8 km; 1.7 mi) north, and East Beacon, 1.5 nautical miles (2.8 km; 1.7 mi) northeast. So named by the NZ-APC following geological work here by C.T. McElroy, G. Rose, and K.J. Whitby in 1980-81.

=== University Peak ===
77°52′S 160°44′E. A peak at the head of University Valley, 2.5 nautical miles (4.6 km; 2.9 mi) south-southwest of West Beacon. Named by USARP researchers Heinz Janetschek, biologist at McMurdo Station, 1961-62, and Fiorenzo Ugolini, geologist at McMurdo Station, 1961-62, after their respective university affiliation, Leopold-Franzens-Universitat at Innsbruck, Austria, and Rutgers University at New Brunswick, New Jersey.

=== Slump Mountain ===
77°52′S 160°43′E. A peak 0.7 nautical miles (1.3 km; 0.81 mi) southwest of University Peak, rising to 2,195 metres (7,201 ft) between the heads of University Valley and Farnell Valley. So named by NZ-APC following geological work carried out by C.T. McElroy, G. Rose, and K.J. Whitby in the 1980-81 season. The face of the peak exhibits large-scale slump structures in the Metschel Tillite zone.

=== Altar Mountain ===
77°54′S 160°51′E. A prominent mountain over 2,000 metres (6,600 ft) high, standing at the south end of Arena Valley. Indicated but not named on Ferrar's 1907 map. So named by the NZGSAE (1958-59) because of its stepped profile and flat top, similar to pyramids of the Aztec and Mayan civilizations.

=== Footscrew Nunatak ===
77°54′S 160°57′E. A nunatak, 1,865 metres (6,119 ft) high, to the southwest of Windy Gully, standing 1.4 nautical miles (2.6 km; 1.6 mi) southeast of Altar Mountain. One of a group of names in the area associated with surveying,

=== Arena Saddle ===
77°53′S 160°48′E. A saddle 1 nautical mile (1.9 km; 1.2 mi) west of Altar Mountain, situated at mid-point on the E-W ridge which forms the head of Arena Valley. Named in association with Arena Valley. The name was approved by the NZ-APC from a proposal by C.T. McElroy who, with G. Rose and K.J. Whitby, carried out geological work in these mountains, 1980-81.

=== New Mountain ===
77°52′S 161°07′E. A mountain, 2,260 metres (7,410 ft) high, standing between Arena Valley and Windy Gully, on the south side of Taylor Glacier. Charted and named by the BrNAE, 1901-04.

== Eastern features ==
Windy Gully separates the main part of the range from the massif that contain Knobhead, Terra Cotta Mountain and Mount Handsley. The massif is also part of the Quartermain Mountains.

=== Knobhead ===
77°55′S 161°32′E. A massive ice-free mountain, 2,400 metres (7,900 ft) high, standing south of the west end of Kukri Hills and overlooking the Ferrar and Taylor Glaciers at their point of apposition. Discovered by the BrNAE (1901-04) and so named because of its appearance.

=== Mount Kuipers ===
77°54′S 161°24′E. An ice-free mountain, 1,940 metres (6,360 ft) high, between Mount Benninghoff and Knobhead. Named by US-ACAN in 1992 after Ronald L. Kuipers, formerly of the Central Intelligence Agency; from 1968-80 associated with committees within the United States Government responsible for coordinating Antarctic policy; initiated and collaborated in the authorship of the atlas Polar Regions, CIA, 1978.

=== Terra Cotta Mountain ===
77°54′S 161°15′E. A mountain between Windy Gully and Knobhead, on the south side of Taylor Glacier. The descriptive name was applied by the BrNAE, 1901-04.

=== Mount Benninghoff ===
77°55′S 161°19′E. A mainly ice-free mountain, 1,965 metres (6,447 ft) high, standing 1.5 nautical miles (2.8 km; 1.7 mi) southeast of Terra Cotta Mountain. Named by US-ACAN in 1993 after William S. Benninghoff (1918-93), Professor of Botany, University of Michigan, 1957-88, retiring as Professor Emeritus of Botany; seasonal visits to Antarctica in 1968, 1976, 1977 and 1989; member, SCAR Working Group on Biology, 1968-87; member, Polar Research Board of the National Academy of Sciences, 1966-86.

=== Mount Handsley ===
77°56′S 161°33′E. A subsidiary rock peak on the Knobhead massif. It rises 1.5 nautical miles (2.8 km; 1.7 mi) south-southeast of Knobhead and overlooks the upper part of Ferrar Glacier from the northwest. Named in 1969 by the NZ-APC after Jesse Handsley, member of the Discovery crew of Captain Robert Scott's expedition, who accompanied Scott, Evans, Feather, Skelton and Lashly on the major sledging journey up the Ferrar and Taylor Glaciers in 1903.

=== Plumb Bob Point ===
77°52′S 161°44′E. A tapering rock point, 4 nautical miles (7.4 km; 4.6 mi) northeast of Knobhead, marking the northeast extremity of the Quartermain Mountains, and the point of apposition of the east-flowing Taylor Glacier and Ferrar Glacier. The name is one of a group in the area associated with surveying applied in 1993 by the NZGB.

== Nearby features ==
=== Static Nunatak ===
77°55′S 160°50′E. A nunatak 2 nautical miles (3.7 km; 2.3 mi) south-southwest of Altar Mountain. The name is one of a group in the area associated with surveying applied in 1993 by NZGB. Static is a modern survey technique involving stationary observations of survey stations with particular relevance to Global Positioning System (GPS) surveys.

=== Catenary Nunatak ===
77°59′S 160°31′E. A nunatak 1 nautical mile (1.9 km; 1.2 mi) southwest of Monastery Nunatak on the south side of Quartermain Mountains. One of a group of names in the area associated with surveying applied in 1993 by NZGB; catenary being the curve in which a survey chain hangs when it is suspended between two points at the same level.

== Sources ==
- Alberts, Fred G., ed. (1995), Geographic Names of the Antarctic (PDF) (2 ed.), United States Board on Geographic Names This article incorporates public domain material from websites or documents of the United States Board on Geographic Names.
- Mount Harmsworth, USGS: United States Geological Survey
- Taylor Glacier, USGS: United States Geological Survey

This article incorporates public domain material from websites or documents of the United States Geological Survey.
