= Mount Crean =

Mountain in Ross Dependency, Antarctica

Mount Crean is one of the westernmost peaks in the dry valley region of South Victoria Land in Antarctica. It lies at 77°53′S 159°30′E, rises to 8,630 feet (2,630 m), and is the highest summit in the Lashly Mountains. It is named after the Irish explorer Tom Crean, who was a member of both of Captain Scott's Antarctic expeditions (Discovery, 1901–04 and Terra Nova, 1910–13), and served as second officer on Sir Ernest Shackleton's Imperial Trans-Antarctic Expedition, 1914–17.

In the 2000–01 summer season a meteorite was found on Mount Crean by a geological party.

There is also a Mount Crean 2,300 feet (700 m) in Greenland.

== Sources ==
- "Mount Crean". Antarctic Meteorite Location and Mapping Project (AMLAML).
- "Tom Crean". Polar Conservation Organisation. Archived from the original on 2012-02-17.
