= Angino Buttress =

Buttress-type mountain in Victoria Land, Antarctica

- Location within Antarctica

Naming
- Etymology: Ernest E. Angino, geologist at McMurdo Station

Geography
- Continent: Antarctica
- Region: Victoria Land
- Area: Skelton Icefalls
- Range coordinates: 78°14′S 158°42′E

Angino Buttress is a prominent buttress-type mountain near the center of the Skelton Icefalls in Victoria Land, Antarctica. It was named by the Advisory Committee on Antarctic Names in 1964 for Ernest E. Angino, geologist at McMurdo Station, 1959–60.

== See also ==
- Mount Metschel
