= Lashly Mountains =

Mountain range in Antarctica

- Location within Antarctica

Geography
- Continent: Antarctica
- Range coordinates: 77°54′S 159°33′E

The Lashly Mountains (77°54′S 159°33′E) are a small group of mountains, the most prominent at 2,550 metres (8,370 ft) being Mount Crean, standing south of the head of Taylor Glacier and west of Lashly Glacier, in Victoria Land, Antarctica.

== Exploration and naming ==
The Lashly Mountains were discovered by the British National Antarctic Expedition (1901–04) and named for William Lashly, a member of the party which explored this area.

== Location ==
The Lashley Mountains are on the edge of the East Antarctic Ice Sheet. They are west of the Quartermain Mountains and Mount Feather, from which they are separated by the Lashly Glacier, which flows south into The Portal. Mount Crean is the highest peak of the range. Portal Mountain lies to the south of the range, above the Skelton Névé.

== Geology ==
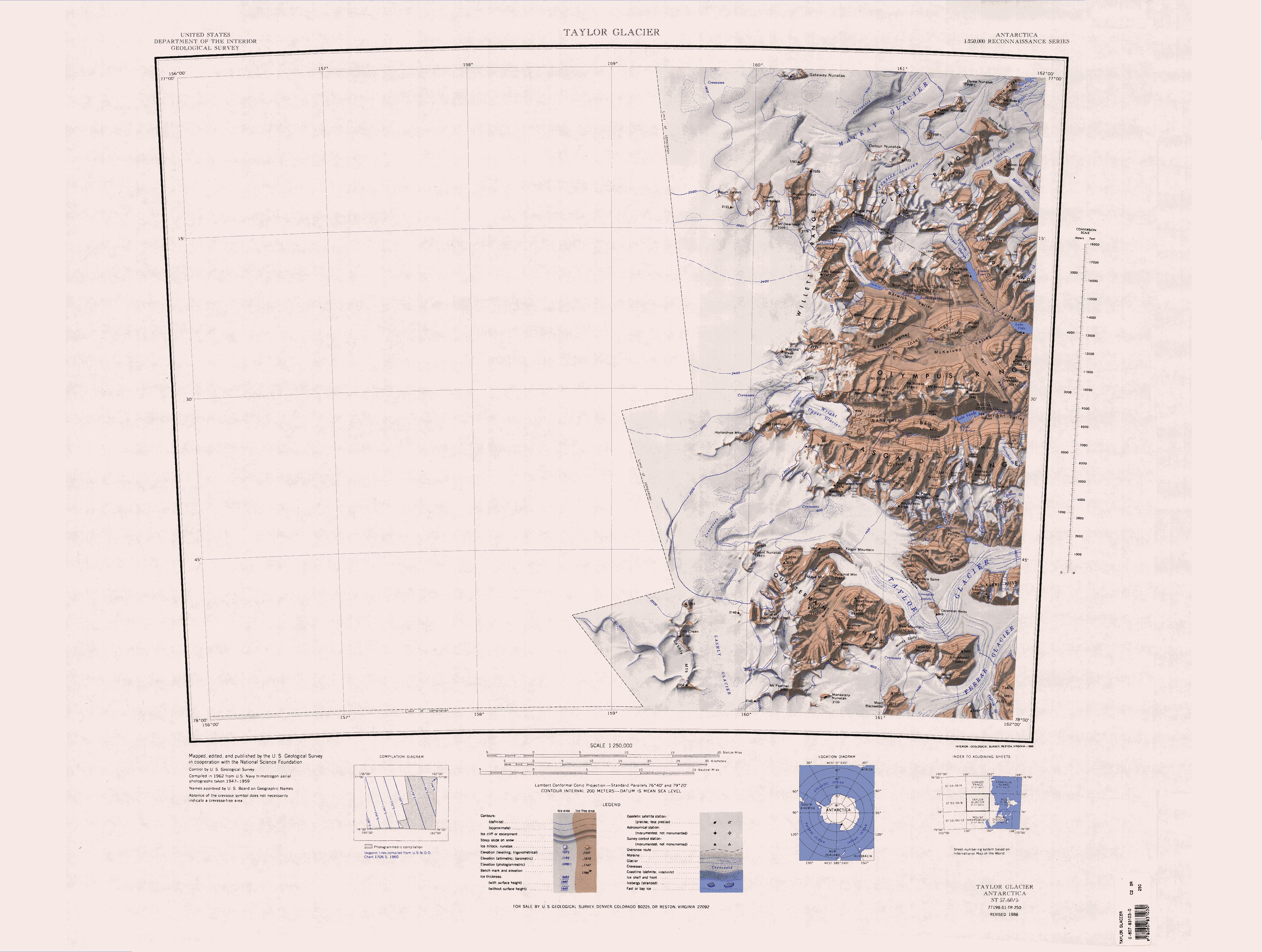
Lashly Mountains in southwest of mapped region

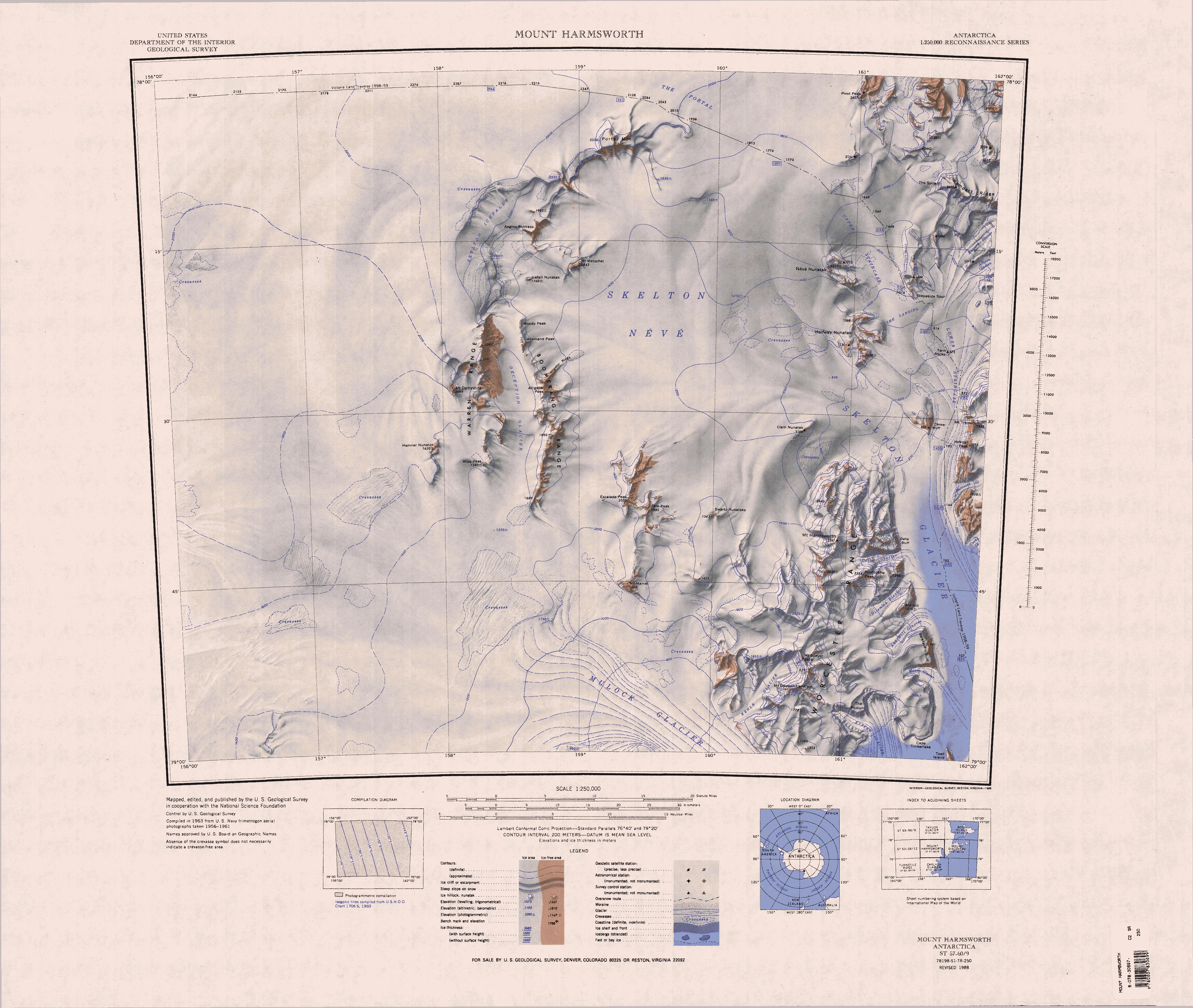
Region to the south of the Lashly Mountains

The Lashly Mountains lie between the intrusive rocks of the McMurdo Dry Valleys and the extrusive rocks of the Transantarctic Mountains. Samples from an unnamed nunatak north of Mount Crean indicated an extrusive origin.

The Lashly Formation is the youngest in the Victoria Group of the Beacon Supergroup. It is a sandstone and siltstone sequence containing plant remains that overlies the Feather conglomerate. It appears to conform with the underlying conglomerate in areas, with local areas of disconformity. The Aztec Siltstone appears to have been deposited on a flat alluvial plain that held streams, swamps, lakes and low emergent areas.

There are plant fossils of Dicroidium flora in much of the Lashley formation, dating from the early to late Triassic. Phytoliths, silica plant microfossils, have been found in four samples collected from the east side of a ridge that extends southeast from Mount Crean. The phytoliths in the two Aztec Siltstone samples were probably from Archaeopteris. Conchostracans have been found together with fish remains in lake beds at Portal Mountain and in the Lashly Mountains.

== Features ==
=== Mount Crean ===
77°53′S 159°30′E. Massive, rocky mountain, 2,550 metres (8,370 ft) high, forming the central and highest summit of the Lashly Mountains. Named by the New Zealand Antarctic Place-Names Committee (NZ-APC) for Petty Officer Thomas Crean, Royal Navy, companion of Lashly with Scott's British National Antarctic Expedition (BrNAE) of 1901-04, and British Antarctic Expedition, 1910–13.

=== Lashly Glacier ===
77°57′S 159°50′E. Short, broad glacier lying between the Lashly Mountains on the west and Tabular Mountain and Mount Feather on the east, flowing south into The Portal. So named by the New Zealand Party of the Commonwealth Trans-Antarctic Expedition (CTAE) (1956-58) for its proximity to the Lashly Mountains.

=== Portal Mountain ===
78°06′S 159°10′E. A large mountain, 2,555 metres (8,383 ft) high, with a broad icecapped summit, standing south of the Lashly Mountains, on the south side of the main stream of the Skelton Glacier where it leaves the polar plateau. Discovered by the New Zealand party of the CTAE (1956-58) who named it because of its association with The Portal. Portal Mountain is the southernmost area of the Feather and Lashly geological formation.

== Gallery ==
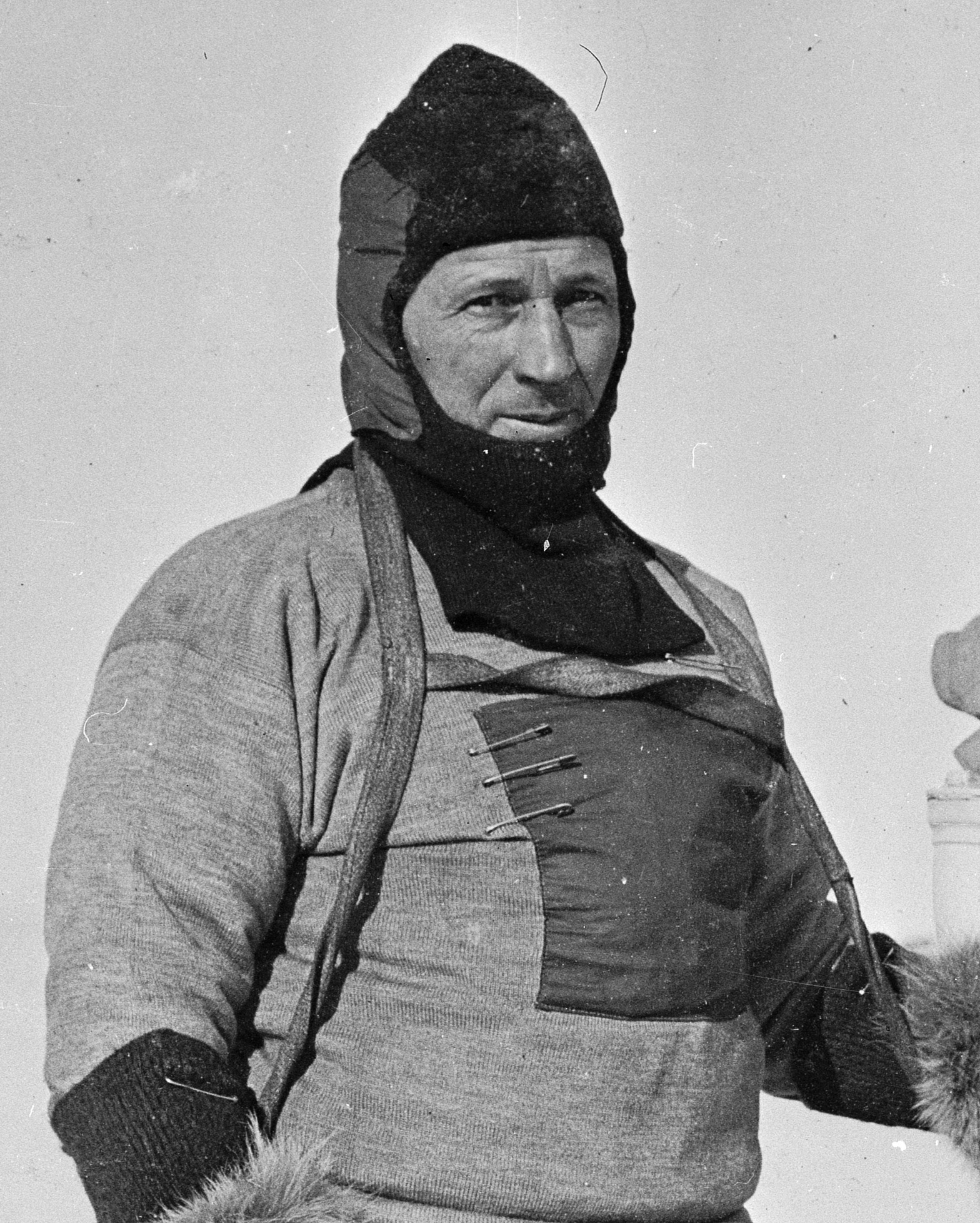
William Lashly, November 1911

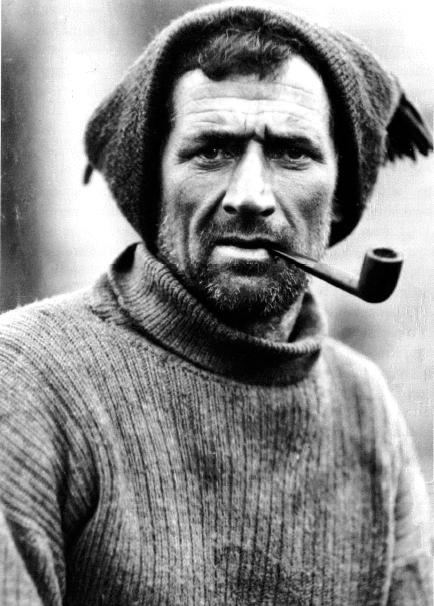
Tom Crean taken aboard the Endurance, 1914

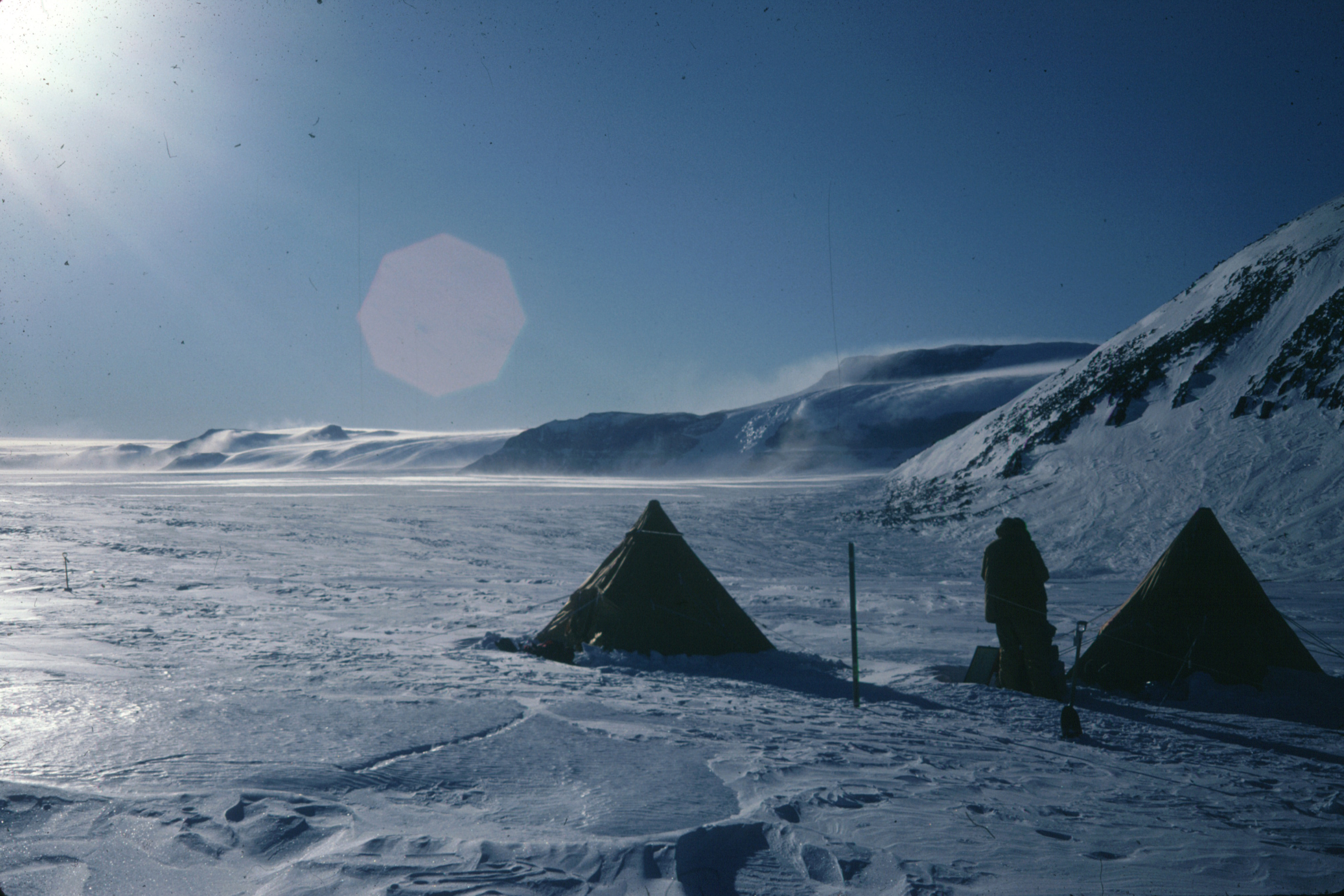
Eastern side of Portal Mountain, looking south towards the Angino Buttress; midnight

== Sources ==
- Alberts, Fred G., ed. (1995), Geographic Names of the Antarctic (PDF) (2 ed.), United States Board on Geographic Names This article incorporates public domain material from websites or documents of the United States Board on Geographic Names.
- Ashauer, Zachary M; Currier, Ryan (2015), The Lashly Mountains Of Southern Victorialand, Antarctica: Investigating A Possible Ancient Volcano, vol. 47, Geological Society of America Abstracts with Programs
- Barrett, P. J.; Kohn, B. P.; Askin, R. A.; McPherson, J. G. (1971), "Preliminary report on Beacon Supergroup studies between the Hatherton and Mackay Glaciers, Antarctica", New Zealand Journal of Geology and Geophysics, 14 (3): 605–614, doi:10.1080/00288306.1971.10421951
- Carter, John A. (1999), "Late Devonian, Permian and Triassic Phytoliths from Antarctica", Micropaleontology, 45 (1): 56–61, doi:10.2307/1486202
- Mount Harmsworth, USGS: United States Geological Survey
- Taylor Glacier, USGS: United States Geological Survey

This article incorporates public domain material from websites or documents of the United States Geological Survey.
