= Beacon Valley =

Beacon Valley Camp
- Field Camp
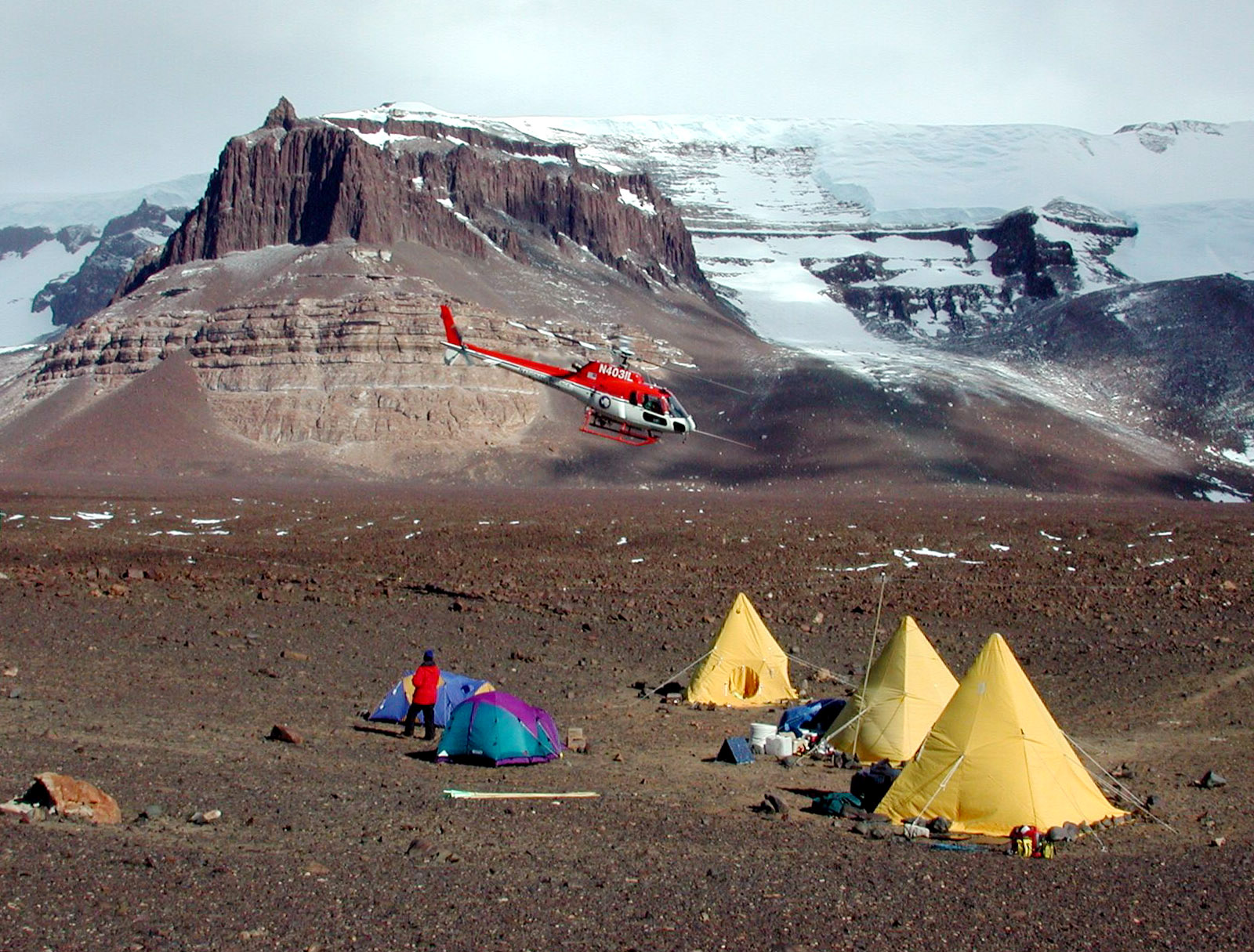
- A helicopter prepares to land at Beacon Valley camp.

- Location of Beacon Valley in Antarctica
- Coordinates: 77°51′32″S 160°34′26″E
- Country: United States
- Location in Antarctica: Beacon Valley; Victoria Land; Antarctica
- Established: 2004
- Type: Seasonal
- Status: Operational

Beacon Valley (77°49′S 160°39′E) is an ice-free valley between Pyramid Mountain and Beacon Heights, in the Quartermain Mountains of Victoria Land, Antarctica. It was mapped by the British Antarctic Expedition, 1910–13, and named by the Victoria University of Wellington Antarctic Expedition (VUWAE) (1958–59) after Beacon Heights.

== Astrobiological characteristics ==
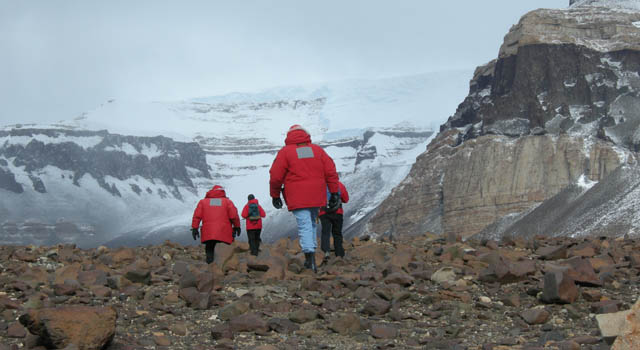
Researchers trek through Antarctica's Beacon Valley, one of the most Mars-like places on Earth. Image credit: NASA

The central region of Beacon valley is considered to be one of the best terrestrial analogues for the current conditions on Mars. There is snowdrift and limited melting around the edges and occasionally in the central region, but for the most part, moisture is only found as thin films of brine around permafrost structures. It has slightly alkaline salt rich soil.

== See also ==
- McMurdo Station transportation
