= Skelton Glacier =

Glacier in Antarctica

- Location within Antarctica
- Location: Ross Dependency
- Coordinates: 78.6935°S 161.6424°E
- Terminus: Ross Ice Shelf

Skelton Glacier (78°35′S 161°30′E) is a large glacier flowing from the polar plateau into the Ross Ice Shelf at Skelton Inlet on the Hillary Coast, south of Victoria Land, Antarctica.

== Naming and exploration ==
Skelton Glacier was named after the Skelton Inlet by the New Zealand party of the Commonwealth Trans-Antarctic Expedition (CTAE), 1956–58. The glacier was chosen in 1957 as the New Zealand party's route from the Ross Ice Shelf to the Antarctic Plateau. The Arctic Institute of North America organized two ground traverses in the antarctic summer of 1959–60 sponsored by the United States Antarctic Research Program. The first left New Zealand's Scott Base on 16 October 1959, crossed part of the Ross Ice Shelf, and on 27 October 1959 reached the foot of the Skelton Glacier. They traversed up the heavily crevassed glacier to a fuel cache deposited on the edge of the Victoria Land plateau by planes of the United States Navy and Air Force. From there they travelled more than 600 miles (970 km) to the end station of the French 1958–59 traverse, then east toward the head of Tucker Glacier.

== Glaciology ==
The Skelton Glacier flows from the high plateau of Victoria Land down to the west edge of the Ross Ice Shelf. It separates the Worcester Range and the Royal Society Range of the Great Antarctic Horst (Transantarctic Mountains). The elevation in the upper névé field is over 2,300 metres (7,500 ft), falling to 84 metres (276 ft) above sea level near Teall Island at its mouth on the Ross Ice Shelf. The west and east sections of the upper glacier are fed by névé fields separated by the Névé Nunatak, Halfway Nunatak and Clinker Bluff. The glacier is also fed by short and steep glaciers from the Worcester Range and Royal Society Range.

Across the mouth, on a line from Teall Island to Fishtail Point, ice thickness varies from 490 to 600 metres (1,610 to 1,970 ft), with very little of the ice grounded. The ocean floor depth along this line varies from 837 to 1,592 metres (2,746 to 5,223 ft) below sea level. Based on 1958–59 measurements of the ice profile and velocity on this line, an estimated equivalent of 712,000,000 cubic metres (2.51×10^{10} cu ft) of water is delivered to the Ross Ice Shelf. A 1961 study of ice movement on the Skelton Glacier estimated that the Skelton névé field and the small cirque glaciers accumulate equivalent of 1,018,000,000 cubic metres (3.60×10^{10} cu ft) of water per year, but assuming no more than 30% of this is lost to katabatic winds, it would seem that little or none of the ice delivered to the Ross Ice Shelf comes from the high Antarctic Plateau.

A study of ice-surface lowering in the upper Skelton Glacier was published in 2020. It concluded that ice surface lowering of the glacier was caused by the retreat of grounded ice in the Ross Sea, which reduced buttressing and drew down the glacier into the Ross Sea. Most of the lowering since the Last Glacial Maximum (LGM) occurred between 15,000 and 6,000 years ago. At Escalade Peak in the upper Skelton valley, far from the mouth, the ice surface was at least 50 metres (160 ft) and possibly more than 120 metres (390 ft) higher in LGM than today. These ice elevation changes in a slow-flowing upvalley glacier are several hundred meters less than previous models predicted, which mainly focussed on elevation changes at the glacier mouths.

== Course ==
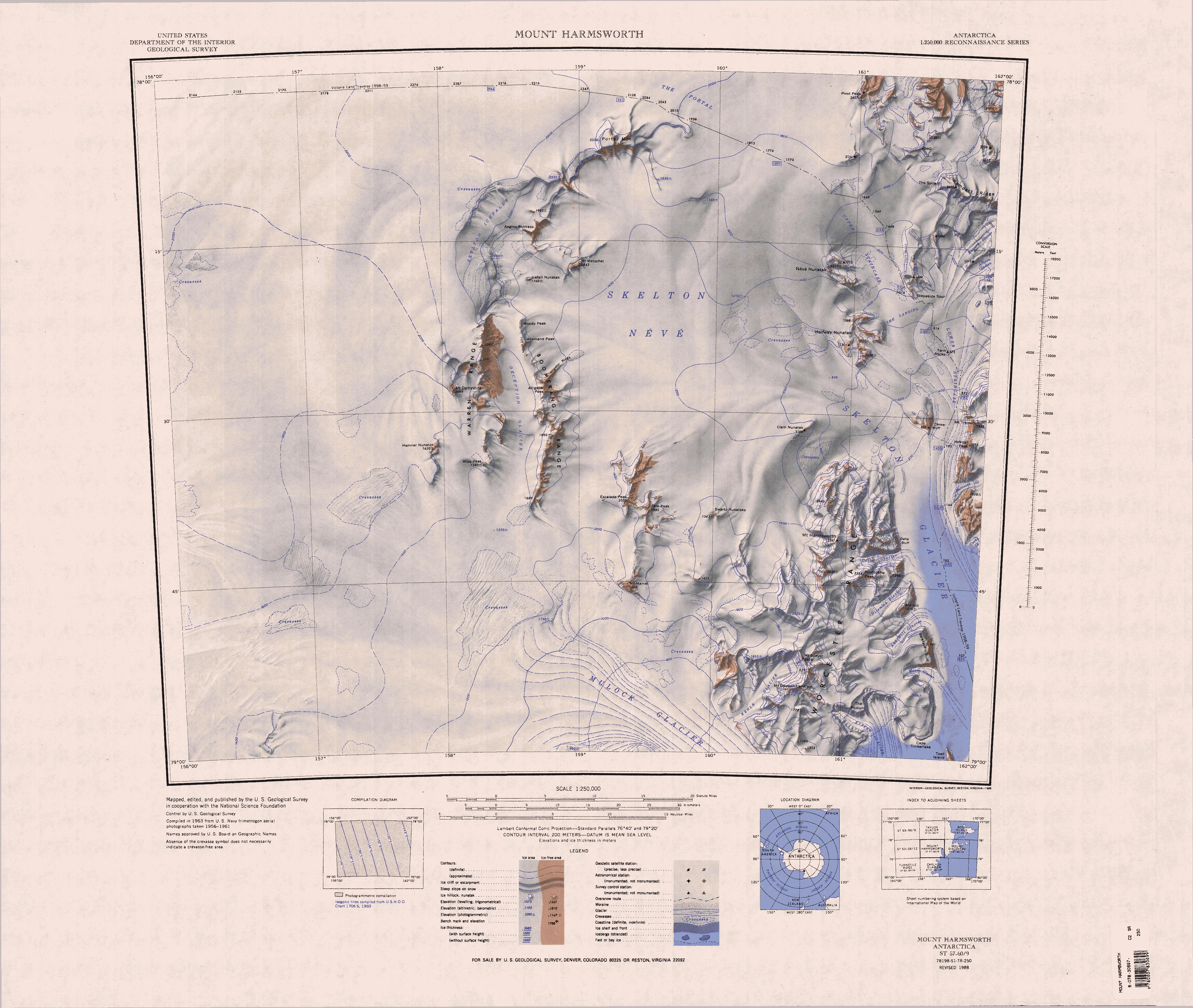
Skelton Glacier (east of map)

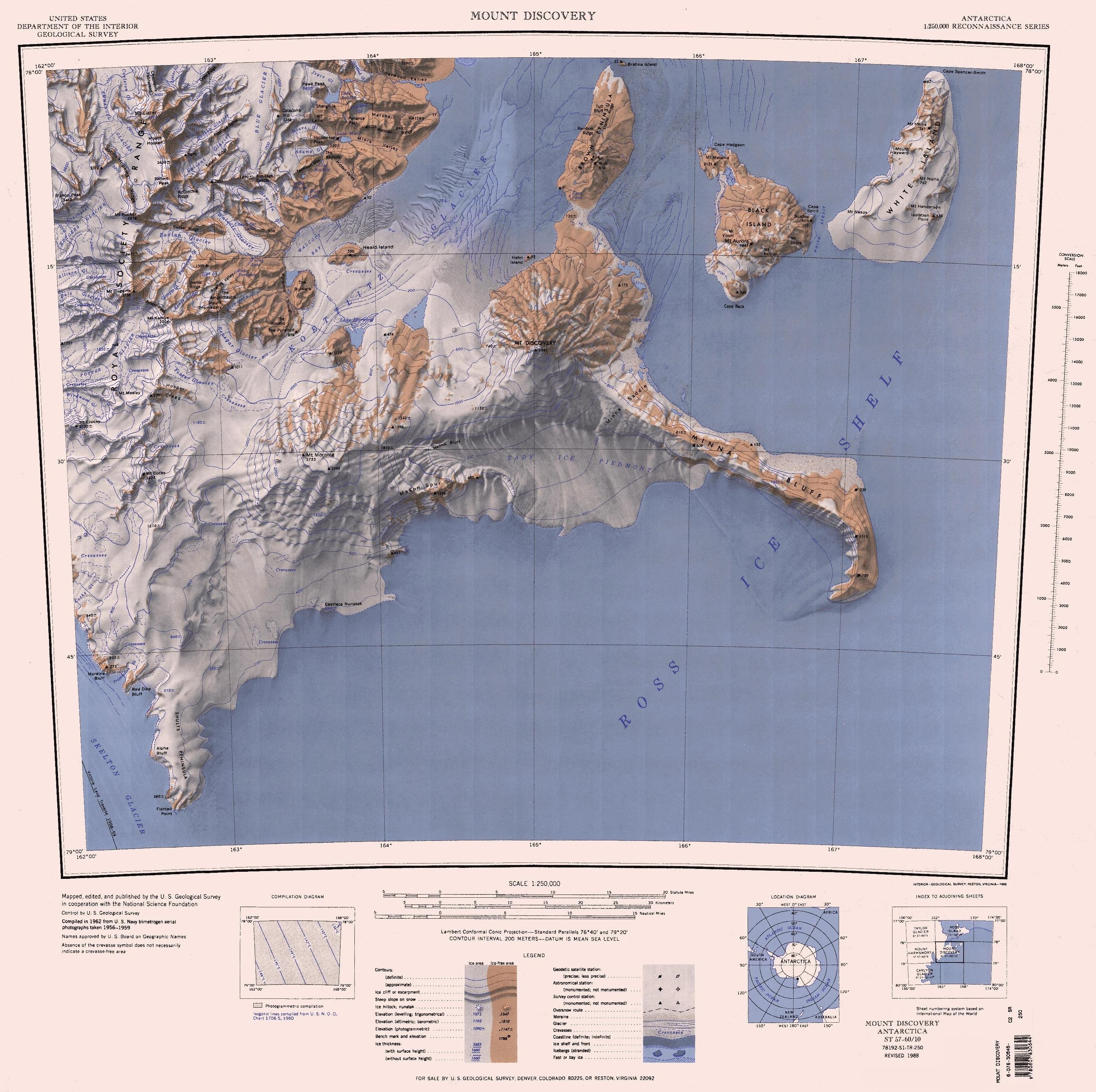
Mouth of Skelton Glacier (southwest of map)

Skelton Glacier rises in the Skelton Névé, which is fed by The Portal and the Skelton Icefalls from the East Antarctic Ice Sheet. The névé lies to the east of the Boomerang Range, north of Escalade Peak and south of Portal Mountain. Scattered nunataks in the névé include Icefall Nunatak, Mount Metschel, Névé Nunatak, Halfway Nunatak, Swartz Nunataks and Clem Nunatak. The Skelton Glacier flows south from the southeast of the névé. The east of the névé feeds the Upper Staircase, The Landing and the Lower Staircase. Lower Staircase flows past Twin Rocks and is fed from the north past Stepaside Spur by Rutgers Glacier, Allison Glacier and Dale Glacier. Further south it is fed from the east from the Royal Society Range by Potter Glacier and Wirdnam Glacier.

The Lower Staircase joins Skelton Glacier past Clinker Bluff, flowing past Mount Tricouni and Hobnail Peak, below which Skelton Glacier is joined from the east by Baronick Glacier and Cocks Glacier. Skelton Glacier flows south along the west side of the Worcester Range, from which it is joined by Delta Glacier below Delta Bluff, Dilemma Glacier, Ant Hill Glacier below Ant Hill, and Mason Glacier below Bareface Bluff. Between Moraine Bluff and Red Dike Bluff to the east it is joined by Trepidation Glacier. It flows south past Alpha Bluff on Shults Peninsula to the east. It enters the Ross Ice Shelf to the east of Evteev Glacier. Cape Timberlake and Teall Island are to the west of the mouth. Fishtail Point at the end of Shults Peninsula lies to the east of the mouth.

== Head ==
Features of the névé that forms the head of the glacier, and its surroundings:

=== Skelton Névé ===
78°20′S 160°00′E. The immense névé of the Skelton Glacier, lying on the west side of the Royal Society Range. Almost circular in outline, it is about 40 nautical miles (74 km; 46 mi) in diameter and has an area of about 1,300 square miles (3,400 km^{2}). Surveyed by New Zealand parties of the CTAE (1956–58), who named it for its relationship to the Skelton Glacier.

=== The Portal ===
78°02′S 159°45′E. The gap between the Lashly Mountains and Portal Mountain, through which the main stream of the Skelton Glacier enters the Skelton névé from the polar plateau. The descriptive name was given in January 1958 by a New Zealand party of the CTAE, 1956–58.

=== Skelton Icefalls ===
78°14′S 158°19′E. Prominent icefalls extending in an arc some 15 nautical miles (28 km; 17 mi) from Portal Mountain to the north end of Warren Range. Named by the United States Advisory Committee on Antarctic Names (US-ACAN) in 1964 in association with Skelton Névé and Skelton Glacier.

=== Icefall Nunatak ===
78°18′S 158°38′E. Prominent ice-free nunatak, 1,760 metres (5,770 ft) high, lying close south of the main flow of Skelton Icefalls. Named by US-ACAN in 1964 for its proximity to Skelton Icefalls.

=== Mount Metschel ===
78°17′S 159°00′E. A prominent ice-free mountain, 1,845 metres (6,053 ft) high, standing 4 nautical miles (7.4 km; 4.6 mi) southeast of Angino Buttress and the Skelton Icefalls. Mapped by the USGS from ground surveys and Navy air photos. Named by US-ACAN for Cdr. John J. Metschel, USN, commander of the icebreaker USS Staten Island in the Antarctic and the Arctic in 1962 and 1963. Metschel was killed in the Arctic, Oct. 15, 1963, while engaged in ice reconnaissance in a helicopter from his ship-

=== Névé Nunatak ===
78°17′S 160°54′E. An isolated nunatak just north of Halfway Nunatak, between the Upper Staircase and the east side of Skelton Névé. Surveyed in 1957 by the New Zealand Northern Survey party of the CTAE (1956–58) and named for its association with Skelton Neve.

=== Halfway Nunatak ===
78°23′S 161°06′E. An isolated nunatak on the west side of The Landing, and almost in the center of the upper Skelton Glacier. Surveyed and descriptively named in 1957 by the New Zealand party of the CTAE, 1956–58.

=== Norton Crag ===
78°21′S 161°05′E. A rock summit at c.1,235 metres (4,052 ft) being the northeastern part of Halfway Nunatak, near the centre of the upper Skelton Glacier. Named by Advisory Committee on Antarctic Names (US-ACAN) (1994) after William L. Norton, U.S. Geological Survey (USGS) cartographer, a member of the satellite surveying team at South Pole Station, winter party, 1991.

=== Upper Staircase ===
78°15′S 161°00′E. The upper eastern portion of Skelton Glacier, just north of The Landing, which merges into the Skelton Névé. Surveyed in 1957 by the New Zealand party of the CTAE (1956–58) and so named because of its staircase effect in being the key for the approach to the polar plateau.

== Right side ==
Tributaries and features on the right (west) side include, from north to south:

=== Delta Glacier ===
78°42′S 161°20′E. A glacier descending steeply from the Worcester Range between Northcliffe Peak and Delta Bluff to enter the west side of Skelton Glacier. It was provisionally named "Cascade Glacier" because of its broken lower icefalls by the New Zealand party of the CTAE, 1956–58. As this name is a duplication, they renamed the glacier after nearby Delta Bluff. Not: Cascade Glacier.

=== Dilemma Glacier ===
78°45′S 161°25′E. A steep, broken glacier descending from the Worcester Range into the west side of Skelton Glacier to the north of Ant Hill. Mapped and named in 1957 by the New Zealand party of the CTAE, 1956–58. So named because of difficulties encountered by the geological party in an attempted descent of this glacier.

=== Ant Hill Glacier ===
78°49′S 161°30′E. Glacier between Ant Hill and Bareface Bluff, rising in the Worcester Range and flowing northeast into Skelton Glacier. Surveyed and named in 1957 by the New Zealand party of the CTAE, 1956–58. Named in association with Ant Hill.

=== Mason Glacier ===
78°53′S 161°41′E. Glacier draining the east slopes of Worcester Range, immediately south of Bareface Bluff, and flowing east into Skelton Glacier. Named by US-ACAN in 1964 for David T. Mason, biologist at McMurdo Station, 1961–62 and 1962–63.

== Left Side ==
Tributaries and features on the left (east) side include, from north to south:

=== The Landing ===
78°22′S 161°25′E. A large flat snowfield in the upper Skelton Glacier, between the Upper and Lower Staircases. Mapped and named in February 1957 by the New Zealand party of the CTAE, 1956–58.

=== Lower Staircase ===
78°25′S 161°45′E. The lower, eastern portion of Skelton Glacier, between The Landing and Clinker Bluff. Surveyed and given this descriptive name in 1957 by the New Zealand party of the CTAE, 1956–58.

=== Twin Rocks ===
78°25′S 161°41′E. Twin rock bluffs in the Lower Staircase of Skelton Glacier, about 6 nautical miles (11 km; 6.9 mi) east of Halfway Nunatak, in Victoria Land. The rocks are an important reference point on the route up the glacier. Descriptively named by the New Zealand party of the CTAE, 1956–58.

=== Stepaside Spur ===
78°18′S 161°25′E. Prominent spur, 1,750 metres (5,740 ft) high, at the east side of Upper Staircase and the Skelton Glacier. Surveyed and named in 1957 by the New Zealand party of the CTAE, 1956–58.

=== Rutgers Glacier ===
78°14′S 161°55′E. A steep glacier in the Royal Society Range, descending southwest from Johns Hopkins Ridge and Mount Rucker to enter the Skelton Glacier. Mapped by the USGS from ground surveys and Navy air photos. Named by US-ACAN after Rutgers University–New Brunswick, New Jersey, which has sent researchers to Antarctica, and in association with Johns Hopkins Ridge and Carleton Glacier.

=== Abbott Spur ===
78°15′22″S 161°53′42″E. An ice-covered spur which separates the lower ends of Rutgers Glacier and Allison Glacier on the west side of Royal Society Range. Named by US-ACAN (1994) after Robin R. Abbott, ASA, Helicopter Field Operations Coordinator at McMurdo Station, active in coordination and planning of science support in Antarctica from 1984.

=== Allison Glacier ===
78°16′S 161°55′E. Glacier with its head just north of Mount Huggins, descending from the west slopes of Royal Society Range into Skelton Glacier. Named by US-ACAN in 1963 for Lt. Cdr. John K. Allison, USN, officer in charge of the wintering-over detachment of Navy Squadron VX-6 at McMurdo Station, 1959.

=== Dale Glacier ===
78°17′S 162°02′E. A glacier which drains the southwest slopes of Mount Huggins in the Royal Society Range and flows west into Skelton Glacier. First visited by Brooke and Gunn of the New Zealand party of the CTAE, 1956–58. Named by US-ACAN in 1963 for Lt. Cdr. Robert L. Dale, USN, officer in charge of the Squadron VX-6 winteringover detachment at McMurdo Station in 1960.

=== Potter Glacier ===
78°23′S 162°12′E. A glacier about 12 nautical miles (22 km; 14 mi) long, between Mounts Huggins and Mount Kempe in the Royal Society Range, flowing generally southwest into the Skelton Glacier. Mapped by USGS from ground surveys and Navy air photos. Named by US-ACAN in 1963 for Lt. Cdr. Edgar A. Potter, USN, helicopter pilot at McMurdo Station in 1960.

=== Wirdnam Glacier ===
78°25′S 162°02′E. Glacier which drains the west slopes of the Royal Society Range between Mount Moxley and Mount Lisicky and flows west into Skelton Glacier. Mapped by USGS from ground surveys and air photos. Named by US-ACAN for Squadron Leader K.A.C. Wirdnam, RAF pilot stationed at McMurdo Station in 1960 as an observer, who.also flew missions for U.S. Navy Squadron VX-6.

=== Pari Haupapa Cliffs ===
78.4666667°S 161.8833333°E. Bold ice-covered cliffs that extend north–south between Wirdman Glacier and Mount Tricouni on the east side of the Lower Staircase of Skelton Glacier. The cliffs are 4 nautical miles (7.4 km; 4.6 mi) long and rise to over 1,000 metres (3,300 ft). Pari Haupapa, a Maori name meaning ice cliffs, was applied by the New Zealand Geographic Board (NZGB) in 1994.

=== Clinker Bluff ===
78°31′S 161°35′E. A detached bluff within the Skelton Glacier, due west of Mount Tricouni. Surveyed in 1957 by the New Zealand party of the CTAE (1956–58) and so named because it resembles the shape of a clinker, a rectangular nail used in alpine boots, and because of its association with nearby Mount Tricouni.

=== Mount Tricouni ===
78°30′S 161°57′E. Prominent peak, 1,630 metres (5,350 ft) high, rising steeply 2 nautical miles (3.7 km; 2.3 mi) north of Hobnail Peak on the east side of Skelton Glacier, in Victoria Land. Surveyed and named in 1957 by the New Zealand party of the CTAE, 1956–58. So named because it resembles a tricouni, a saw-toothed nail used on soles of alpine boots.

=== Hobnail Peak ===
78°32′S 161°53′E. Triangular rock bluff immediately south of Mount Tricouni, on the east side of Skelton Glacier in Victoria Land. Explored in 1957 by the New Zealand party, of the CTAE (1956–58), and named in association with Clinker Bluff and Mount Tricouni.

=== Baronick Glacier ===
78°36′S 161°50′E. A glacier 6 nautical miles (11 km; 6.9 mi) southwest of Mount Cocks, in the Royal Society Range, draining into the Skelton Glacier to the west. Named by US-ACAN in 1963 for Chief Aviation Ordnanceman Michael P. Baronick, of U.S. Navy Squadron VX-6, who wintered at Williams Air Operating Facility at McMurdo Sound in 1956 and was in Antarctica several summer seasons. Baronick, with a party of three, was in command of the Beardmore Air Operating Facility established on Oct. 28, 1956, at 84°56′S 166°00′W.

=== Cocks Glacier ===
78°41′S 162°00′E. The glacier draining the southwest face of Mount Cocks and a considerable area south of the mountain, and entering the Skelton Glacier opposite the Delta Glacier. Surveyed in 1957 by the New Zealand reconnaissance party to the CTAE (1956–58), and named after Mount Cocks.

=== Moraine Bluff ===
78°46′S 162°12′E. A bluff, 930 metres (3,050 ft) high, on the east side of the Skelton Glacier, lying north of Red Dike Bluff. Surveyed and named in 1957 by the New Zealand party of the CTAE (1956–58). So named because a long morainic strip extends from the foot of the bluff on to the Skelton Glacier.

=== Trepidation Glacier ===
78°46′S 162°21′E. Small glacier entering the east side of Skelton Glacier between Moraine Bluff and Red Dike Bluff. The name was applied by the New Zealand party of the CTAE (1956–58) and refers to a 1957 attempt by an aircraft to land on the exceedingly broken ice at the foot of the glacier.

=== Red Dike Bluff ===
78°48′S 162°19′E. A prominent bluff immediately south of Trepidation Glacier on the east side of the Skelton Glacier. The bluff is distinguished by a dike consisting of igneous rock against a black background of the intruded sediments. The descriptive name was given in 1957 by the New Zealand party of the CTAE, 1956–58. Not: Red Dyke Bluff.

=== Shults Peninsula ===
78°52′S 162°39′E. A bold, mainly ice-covered peninsula, 10 nautical miles (19 km; 12 mi) long and 5 nautical miles (9.3 km; 5.8 mi) wide, at the east side of the mouth of Skelton Glacier in Victoria Land. Mapped by the USGS from ground surveys and Navy air photos. Named by US-ACAN for Capt. Roy G. Shults, USN, Chief of Staff to the Commander, U.S. Naval Support Force, Antarctica, 1962 and 1963.

=== Alpha Bluff ===
78°52′S 162°29′E. A high bluff on the west side of Shults Peninsula, at the east side of Skelton Glacier. Surveyed and named in 1957 by the New Zealand party of the CTAE (1956–58). Named after the first letter of the Greek alphabet because it is the most southerly of all bluffs on the Skelton Glacier.

== Mouth ==
Features at the mouth of the glacier are:

=== Skelton Inlet ===
78°54′S 162°15′E. An ice-filled inlet at the terminus of Skelton Glacier, along the western edge of Ross Ice Shelf. The feature is about 10 nautical miles (19 km; 12 mi) wide at the entry points between Cape Timberlake and Fishtail Point. Discovered by the British Antarctic Expedition, 1901–04, which named this feature for Lt. Reginald W. Skelton, RN, chief engineer of the expedition ship Discovery.

=== Cape Timberlake ===
78°58′S 161°37′E. Bold cape at the west side of the mouth of Skelton Glacier. Named by US-ACAN in 1964 for Lt. Cdr. Lewis G. Timberlake, USN, public works officer at McMurdo Station, 1962.

=== Teall Island ===
79°03′S 161°54′E. A high ridgelike island which rises above the Ross Ice Shelf at the west side of the mouth of Skelton Inlet. This may be the feature actually sighted and named Cape Teall by the British Antarctic Expedition, 1901–04. It was first mapped as an island by the New Zealand party of the CTAE (1956–58) and named in association with nearby Cape Teall. Not: Teale Island.

=== Black Cap ===
79°00′S 161°51′E. A prominent black rock peak which surmounts the northwest end of Teall Island, just south of the mouth of Skelton Glacier. Sighted and given this descriptive name in February 1957 by the New Zealand party of the CTAE (1956–58).

=== Fishtail Point ===
78°57′S 162°36′E. The southernmost point of Shults Peninsula, at the east side of the mouth of Skelton Glacier. Surveyed and given this descriptive name in 1957 by the New Zealand party of the CTAE (1956–58).

== Sources ==
- "Abbott Spur", Gazetteer, AACD: Australian Antarctic Data Centre
- Alberts, Fred G., ed. (1995), Geographic Names of the Antarctic (PDF) (2 ed.), United States Board on Geographic Names This article incorporates public domain material from websites or documents of the United States Board on Geographic Names.
- Anderson, Jacob T.H.; Wilson, Gary S.; Selwyn Jones, R.; Fink, David; Fujioka, Toshiyuki (1 June 2020), "Ice surface lowering of Skelton Glacier, Transantarctic Mountains, since the Last Glacial Maximum: Implications for retreat of grounded ice in the western Ross Sea", Quaternary Science Reviews, 237, doi:10.1016/j.quascirev.2020.106305
- Mount Discovery, USGS: United States Geological Survey
- Mount Harmsworth, USGS: United States Geological Survey
- Norton Crag, AADC: Australian Antarctic Data Centre
- "Pari Haupapa Cliffs", Geographic Names Information System, United States Geological Survey, United States Department of the Interior
- Weihaupt, John G. (1960), "Victoria Land Traverse, Antarctica, 1959-1960", Arctic, 13 (2): 73–144, doi:10.14430/arctic3694
- Wilson, C.R.; Crary, A.P. (1961), "Ice Movement Studies on the Skelton Glacier", Journal of Glaciology, 3 (29): 873–878, doi:10.3189/S0022143000027258
- This article incorporates public domain material from websites or documents of the United States Geological Survey.
