= Backdrop Ridge =

Backdrop Ridge (78°21′S 163°18′E) is an east–west ridge running to the north of the Stage on the north side of Renegar Glacier, Scott Coast, Antarctica. It links the northern ends of the West, Central and East Aisle Ridges. It was named by a New Zealand Geological Survey field party led by D. N. B. Skinner from 1977 to 1978 for its position behind the Stage.
