= Royal Society Range =

Mountain range in Antarctica

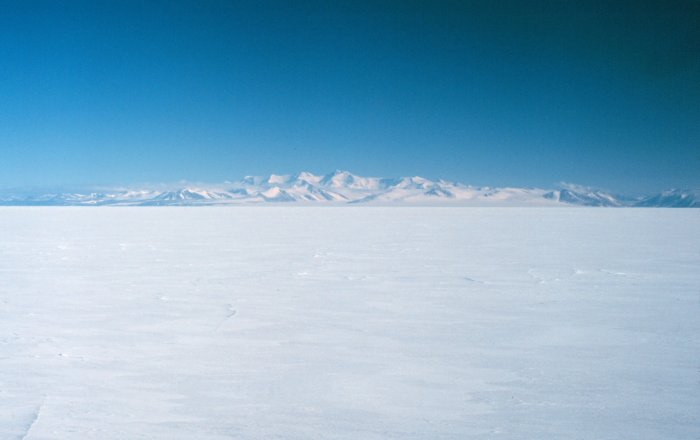
- View of the Royal Society Range from the Ross Sea

Highest point
- Peak: Mount Lister
- Elevation: 13,205 ft (4,025 m)
- Coordinates: 78°10′00″S 162°40′00″E

Geography
- Location within Antarctica
- Continent: Antarctica
- Region(s): Victoria Land, Antarctica
- Parent range: Transantarctic Mountains

The Royal Society Range (78°10′S 162°40′E) is a majestic range of mountains in Victoria Land, Antarctica, rising to 4,025 metres (13,205 ft) along the west shore of McMurdo Sound between the Koettlitz, Skelton and Ferrar Glaciers. They are south of the Kukri Hills, southeast of the Quartermain Mountains, and northeast of the Worcester Range.

With its summit at 4,025 metres (13,205 ft), the massive Mount Lister forms the highest point in this range. Mount Lister is located along the western shore of McMurdo Sound between the Koettlitz, Skelton and Ferrar glaciers. Other notable local terrain features include Allison Glacier, which descends from the west slopes of the Royal Society Range into Skelton Glacier.

== Discovery and naming ==
The range was probably first seen by Captain James Clark Ross in 1841. It was explored by the British National Antarctic Expedition (BrNAE; 1901–04) under Robert Falcon Scott, who named the range after the Royal Society and applied names of its members to many of its peaks. For example, Mount Lister was named for Lord Joseph Lister, President of the Royal Society, 1895–1900. The Royal Society provided financial support to BrNAE and its members had assisted on the committee which organized the expedition.

== Geology ==
The Royal Society Range consists of a Precambrian igneous and meta-igneous basement complex overlain by Devonian- to Triassic-age sandstones, siltstones and conglomerates of the Beacon Supergroup which dip shallowly westward away from the Ross Sea coast. The entire region is cut by north–south trending longitudinal faults, east–west trending transverse faults, and structurally related dike swarms.

Tectonic and fluvial activity have featured very heavily in the recent geologic history of the Royal Society Range. Following the extension of the Ross Sea Basin (c. 55 million years ago), an episode of uplift drove the creation of the Royal Society Range rift flank. At this time a tectonic (though not accretionary) wedge, up to 6 km thick on the coast, was present, though it quickly began to erode due primarily to fluvial processes, and the Royal Society Range was cut down near to its present appearance by the mid-Miocene. Relatively limited glacial action since that time has preserved much of the fluvial architecture of the Range, and though uplift did not cease, its magnitude is such that it has not drastically affected the landscape, having progressed only 67 meters in the last 8 million years.

=== Koettlitz Glacier Alkaline Province ===
Neoproterozoic tectonic extension along the edge of the East Antarctic Craton between the Skelton and Koettlitz Glaciers resulted in the emplacement of coarse grained alkaline igneous intrusive rocks (ranging from gabbro to A-type granite). This area of alkaline intrusives is referred to as the Koettlitz Glacier Alkaline Province.

=== Ross Orogeny ===
Cambrian tectonic convergence, continental collision and plate subduction led to the emplacement of calc-alkaline and adakitic granitoids. This period of mountain building is referred to as the Ross Orogeny.

=== Volcanic history ===
The Royal Society Range contains over 50 basaltic vents, ranging in size from tiny mounds to cinder cones up to 300 meters (985 feet) high. Dating of surface material indicates they were active earlier than 15 million years ago (e.g. Heald Island) and as recently as 80,000 years ago, with glacier-bound tephra layers suggesting even more recent Holocene activity. The vast majority of vents are located in the foothills of the Royal Society mountains just north of Koettlitz Glacier, and most are Quaternary in age. Most emanating flows are 3–10 meters thick and less than 4 kilometers long. The composition, with very few exceptions, is porphyritic basanite with primarily olivine and clinopyroxene phenocrysts, though some phenocrystic plagioclase is also present.

== Location ==
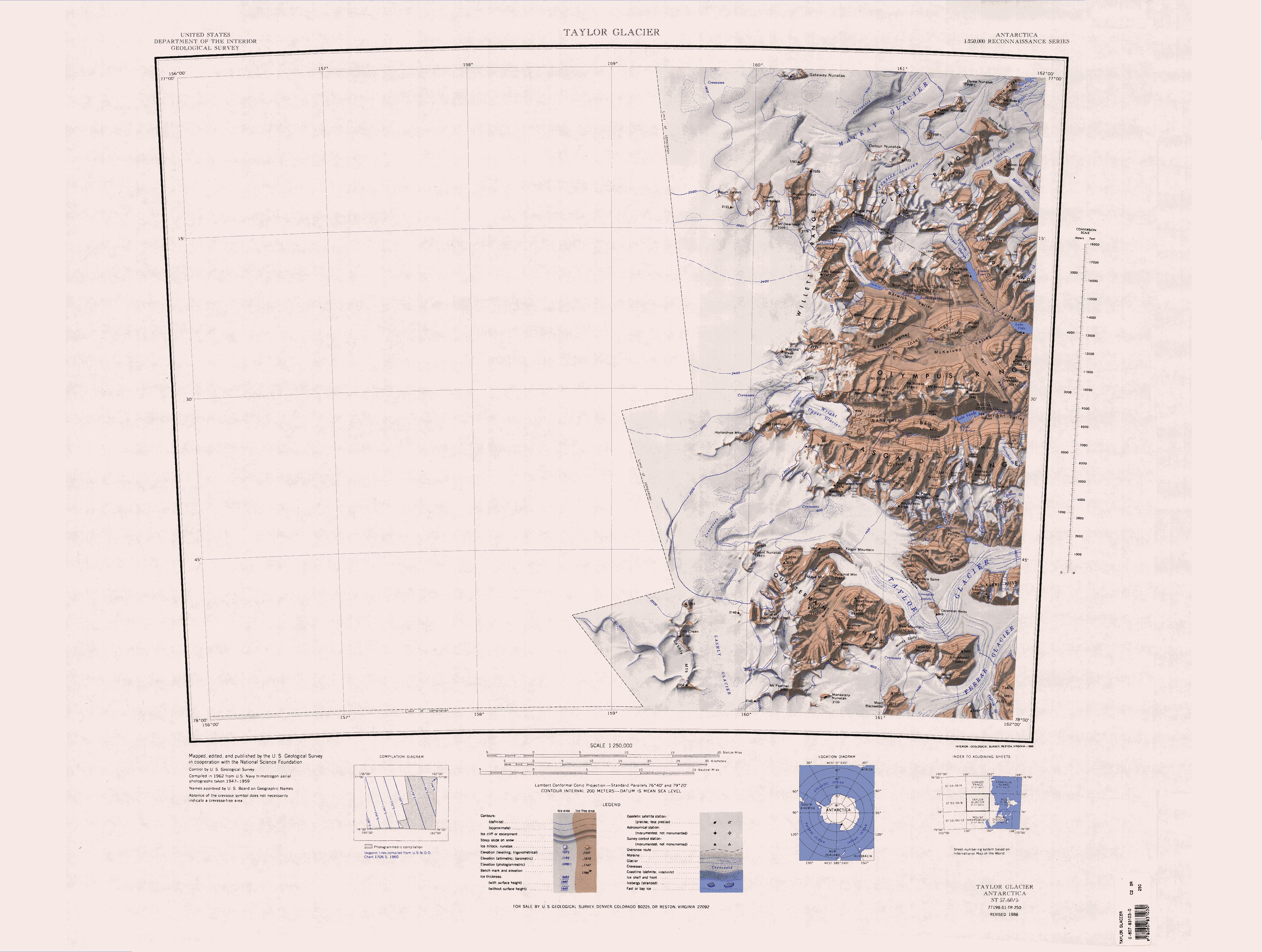
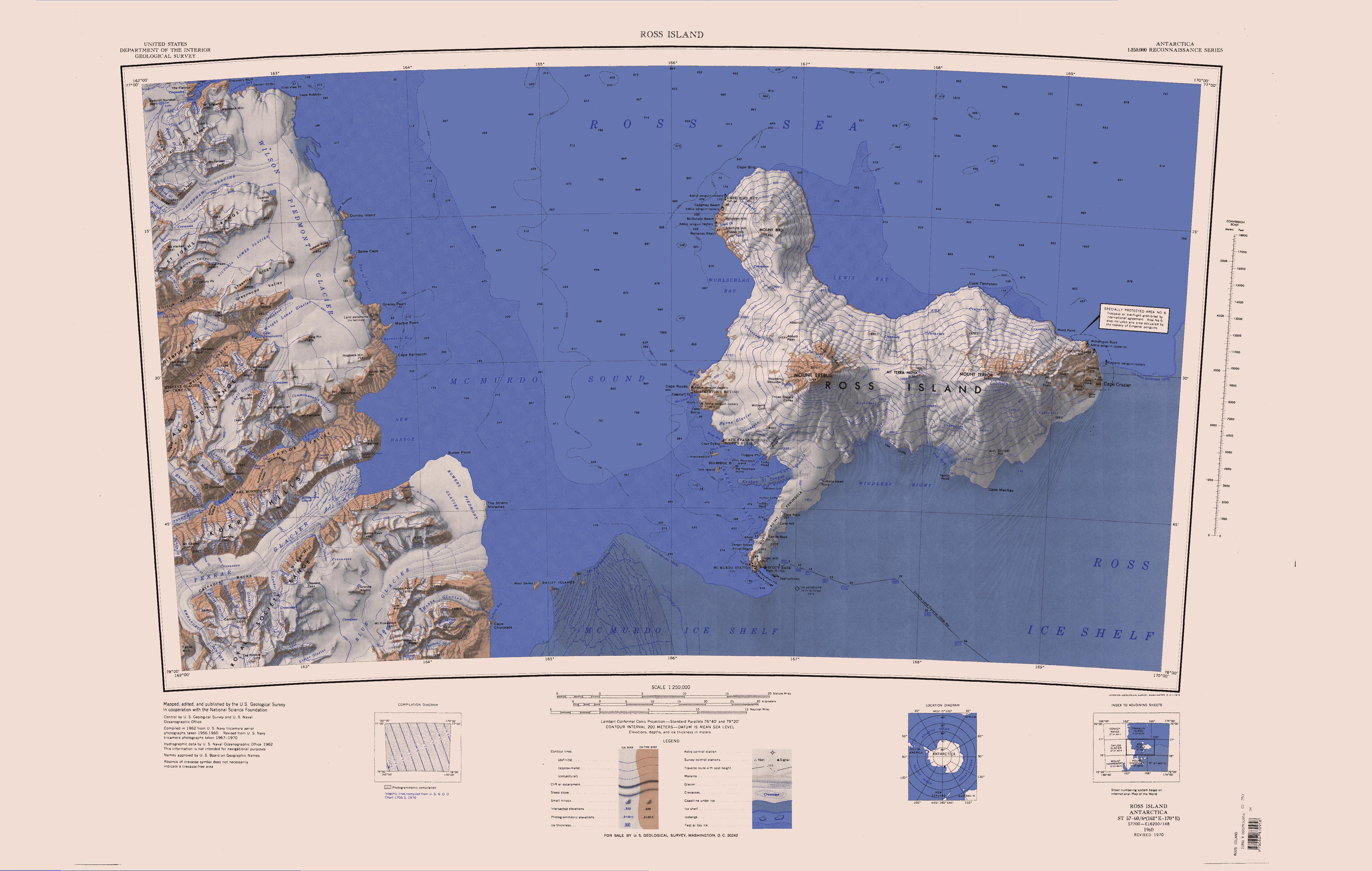

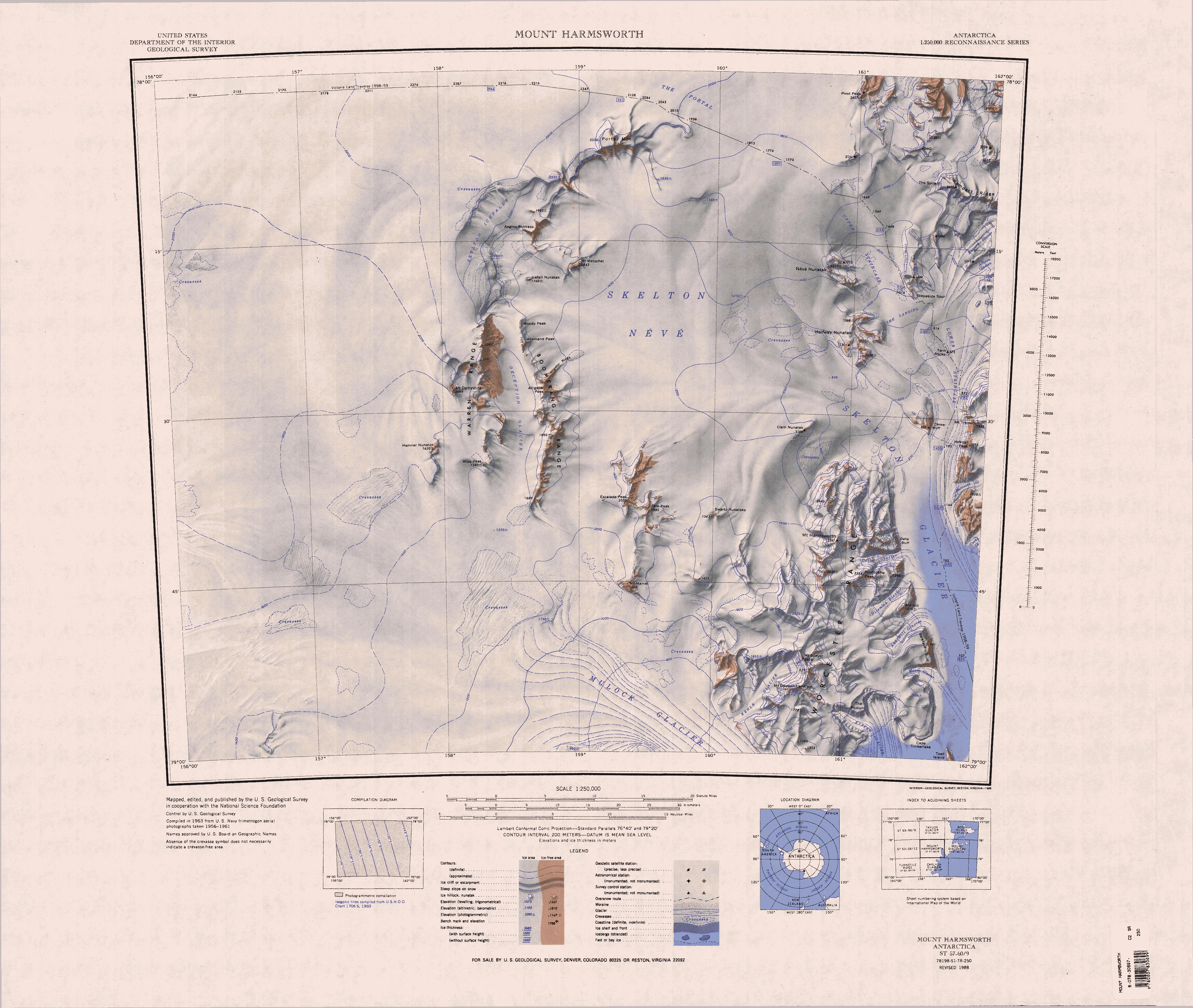
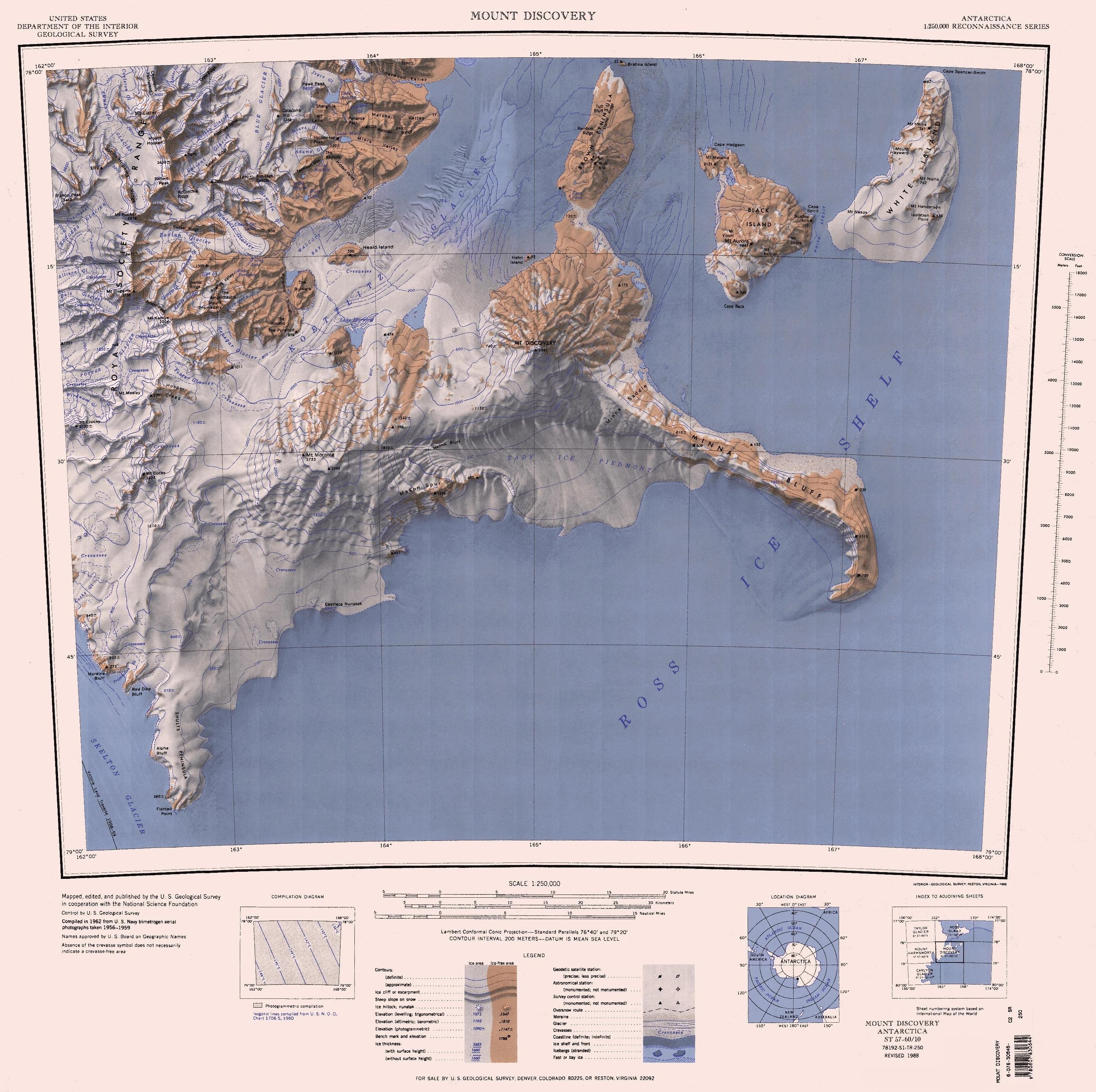
Royal Society Range extends from southwest to northeast

The Royal Society range borders the Bowers Piedmont Glacier and the Blue Glacier to the east. The Blue Glacier separates the range from the Denton Hills, which run from north to south along the coast of McMurdo Sound in the northeast, and along the northwest side of the Koettlitz Glacier further south. The Pyramid, the southeast tip of the range, is on the north side of the Koettlitz Glacier. The southwest and west of the range lies to the east of the Skelton Glacier, which rises in the Skelton Névé to the west of the range and flows south into the Ross Ice Shelf. The northwest of the range lies to the east and south of the Ferrar Glacier, which flows east along the north of the range to New Harbour in McMurdo Sound.

== Glaciers ==
The surrounding glaciers are:

- Blue Glacier, a large glacier which flows into Bowers Piedmont Glacier about 10 nautical miles (19 km; 12 mi) south of New Harbour.
- Koettlitz Glacier, a large glacier lying west of Mount Morning and Mount Discovery in the Royal Society Range, flowing from the vicinity of Mount Cocks northeastward between Brown Peninsula and the mainland into the ice shelf of McMurdo Sound.
- Skelton Glacier, a large glacier flowing from the Antarctic Plateau into the Ross Ice Shelf at Skelton Inlet on the Hillary Coast.
- Ferrar Glacier, a glacier about 35 nautical miles (65 km; 40 mi) long, flowing from the plateau of Victoria Land west of the Royal Society Range to New Harbour in McMurdo Sound.

== Features ==
Major features include:

- Colwell Massif (78°2′S 161°33′E), a rugged rock massif, about 4 nautical miles (7.4 km; 4.6 mi) long, rising to 2,635 metres (8,645 ft) between Palais Glacier, Ferrar Glacier, and Rotunda Glacier.
- Table Mountain (77°57′S 162°00′E), a large flat mountain rising to over 2,000 metres (6,600 ft) immediately south of the junction of the Emmanuel Glacier and Ferrar Glacier in Victoria Land.
- Cathedral Rocks (77°51′S 162°36′E), a series of four abrupt cliffs interspersed by short glaciers and surmounted by sharp peaks. The cliffs extend for 8 nautical miles (15 km; 9.2 mi) along the south side of Ferrar Glacier and form part of the north shoulder of the Royal Society Range.
- Briggs Hill (77°49′S 163°0′E), a conspicuous ice-free hill, 1,210 metres (3,970 ft) high, standing on the south side of Ferrar Glacier between Descent Glacier and Overflow Glacier.
- Bettle Peak (77°47′18″S 163°31′50″E), a peak, 1,490 metres (4,890 ft) high, standing west of Bowers Piedmont Glacier and 6 nautical miles (11 km; 6.9 mi) north of the Granite Knolls.
- Rampart Ridge (78°10′S 161°55′E), a prominent broken ridge on the west side of the Royal Society Range. It stands north of Rutgers Glacier and extends from The Spire to Bishop Peak.
- Mount Lister (78°04′S 162°41′E), a massive mountain, 4,025 metres (13,205 ft) high, forming the highest point in the Royal Society Range.
- Mount Rücker' (78°11′S 162°32′E), a mountain, 3,815 metres (12,516 ft) high, immediately south of Johns Hopkins Ridge.
- Radian Ridge (78.23333°S 162.66667°E), a ridge extending east from the scarp of the Royal Society Range, along the south side of Radian Glacier.
- Mount Dromedary (78°19′S 163°02′E), a hump-shaped mountain, over 2,400 metres (7,900 ft) high, standing 4 nautical miles (7.4 km; 4.6 mi) east of Mount Kempe.
- Mount Schwerdtfeger (78.35°S 162.7666667°E), a peak, 2,950 metres (9,680 ft) high on the ridge at the head of Renegar Glacier, 1.75 nautical miles (3.24 km; 2.01 mi) south of Mount Kempe.
- Harvey Summit (78.3144444°S 162.3025°E), a peak 2,644 metres (8,675 ft) high at the head of McDermott Glacier.

== Gallery ==
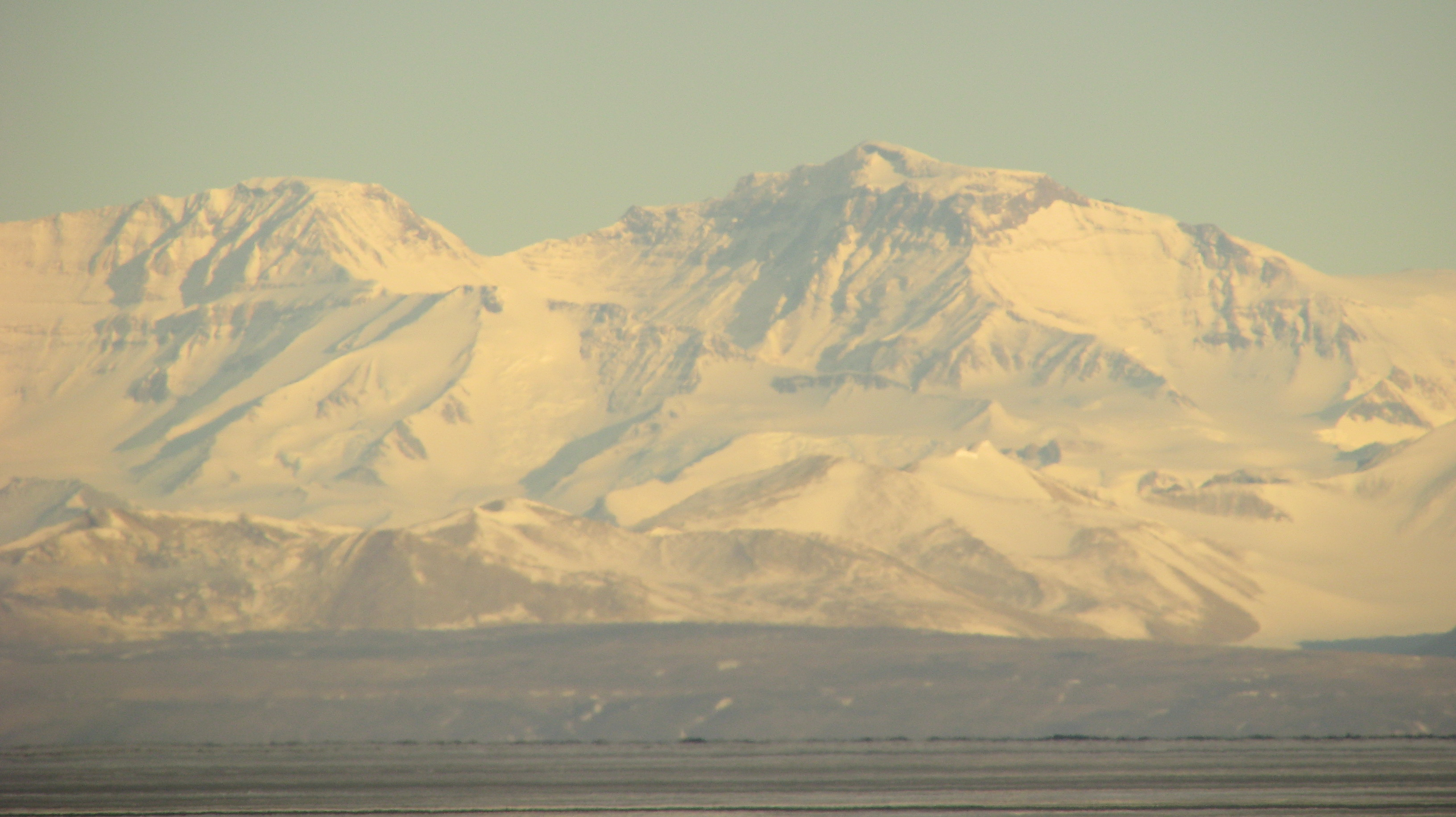
Mount Lister, tallest peak in range seen from McMurdo Station, March 2015

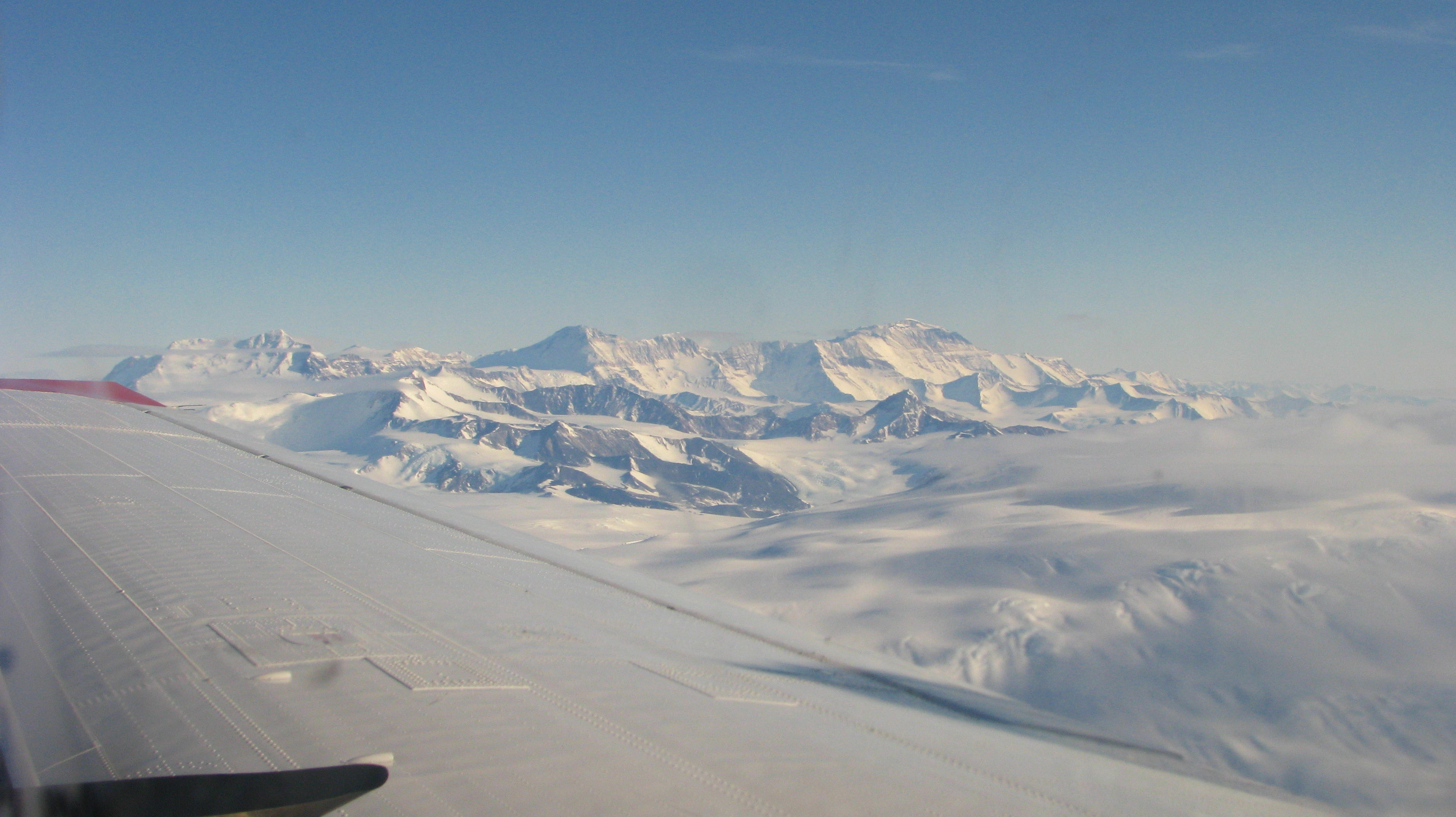
Royal Society Range seen from South, November 2011

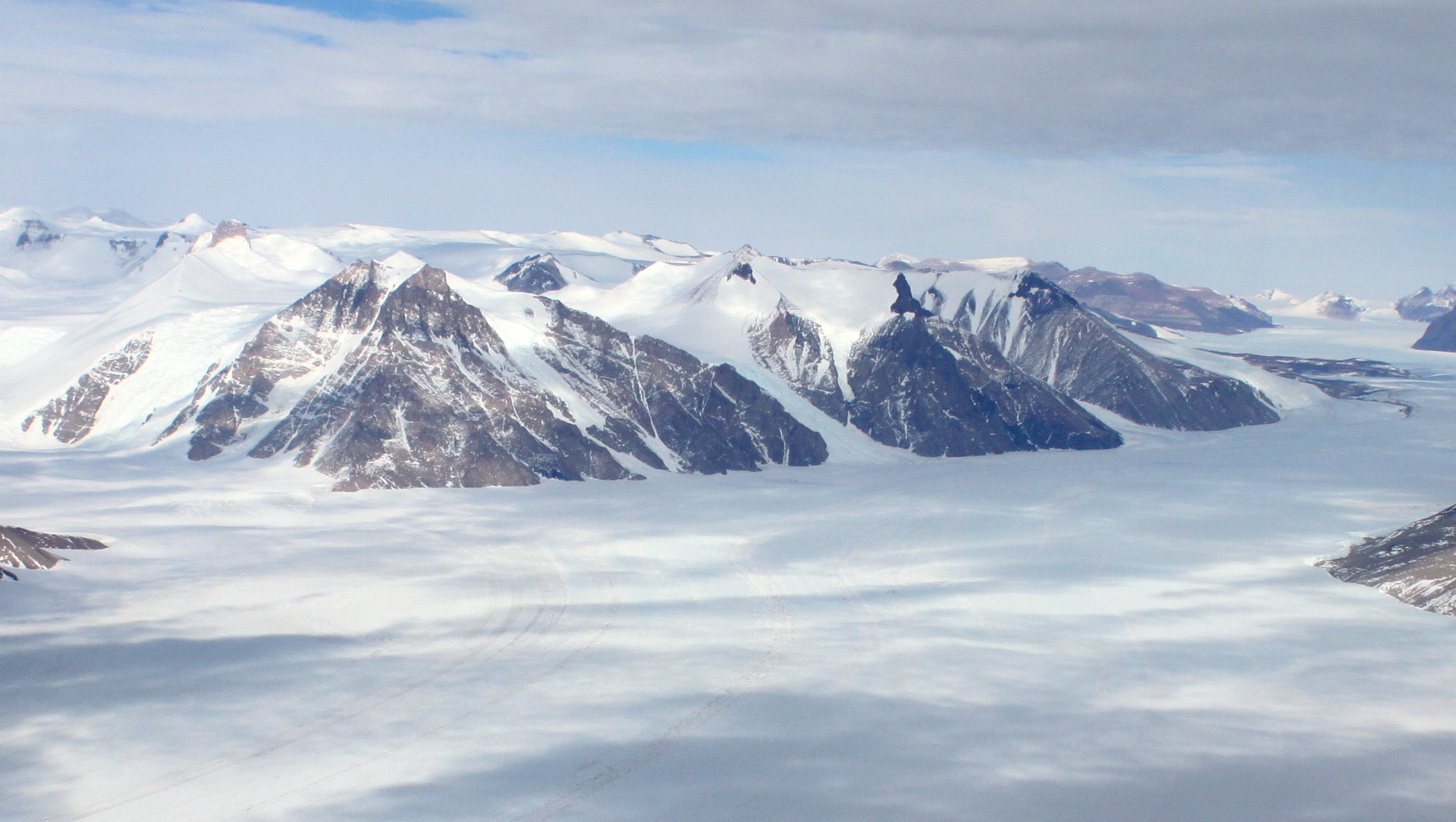
Cathedral Rocks

== Sources ==
- Alberts, Fred G., ed. (1995), Geographic Names of the Antarctic (PDF) (2 ed.), United States Board on Geographic Names This article incorporates public domain material from websites or documents of the United States Board on Geographic Names.
- Armstrong, R.L. (1978), "K-Ar dating: Late Cenozoic McMurdo Volcanic Group and Dry Valley glacial history, Victoria Land, Antarctica", New Zealand Journal of Geology and Geophysics, 21 (6): 685–698, doi:10.1080/00288306.1978.10425199
- "Harvey Summit", Geographic Names Information System, United States Geological Survey, United States Department of the Interior
- Mount Discovery, USGS: United States Geological Survey
- Mount Harmsworth, USGS: United States Geological Survey
- "Mount Schwerdtfeger", Geographic Names Information System, United States Geological Survey, United States Department of the Interior
- Radian Ridge, AADC: Australian Antarctic Data Centre
- Read, S. E. (2010), Koettlitz Glacier Alkaline Province : Late Neoproterozoic extensional magmatism in southern Victoria Land, Antarctica (Thesis, Doctor of Philosophy), hdl:10523/5428
- Ross Island, USGS: United States Geological Survey
- Sugden, D.E.; Summerfield, M.A.; Denton, G.H.; Wilch, T.I.; McIntosh, W.C.; Marchant, D.R.; Rutford, R.H. (1999), "Landscape development in the Royal Society Range, southern Victoria Land, Antarctica: stability since the mid-Miocene" (PDF), Geomorphology, 28 (3–4): 181–200, doi:10.1016/S0169-555X(98)00108-1
- Taylor Glacier, USGS: United States Geological Survey
- Wilch, T.I. (1991), The surficial geology and geochronology of middle Taylor Valley Antarctica: Implications for Plio-Pleistocene Antarctic glacial history (M.S. thesis), Orono: The University of Maine, p. 363
- Wilson, T.J. (1995), "Cenozoic transtension along the Transantarctic Mountains–West Antarctic rift boundary, southern Victoria Land, Antarctica", Tectonics, 14: 531–545, doi:10.1002/(ISSN)1944-9194
- Wright, A.C.; Kyle, P.R. (1990), "Royal Society Range Summary", in LeMasurier, W.E.; Thomson, J.W. (eds.), Volcanoes of the Antarctic Plate and Southern Oceans, Antarctic Research Series, vol. 48, Washington, DC: American Geophysical Union, pp. 81–88

This article incorporates public domain material from websites or documents of the United States Geological Survey.
