= East Aisle Ridge =

East Aisle Ridge (78°21′S 163°23′E) is a north–south ridge 1 nautical mile (2 km) east of Central Aisle Ridge at the junction of the lower Renegar Glacier and Koettlitz Glacier, Scott Coast, Antarctica. The name is derived from the position of the ridge relative to West Aisle Ridge, Central Aisle Ridge, and its proximity to The Stage. It was named by the New Zealand Geographic Board in 1994, following work by a New Zealand Geological Survey party to the area in 1977–78. .
