= Bettle Peak =

Mountain in Antarctica

- Location within Antarctica

Highest point
- Coordinates: 77°47′18″S 163°31′50″E

Geography
- Continent: Antarctica
- Region: Victoria Land

Bettle Peak (77°47′18″S 163°31′50″E) is a peak, 1,490 metres (4,890 ft) high, standing west of Bowers Piedmont Glacier and 6 nautical miles (11 km; 6.9 mi) north of the Granite Knolls in Victoria Land. It was named by the United States Advisory Committee on Antarctic Names (US-ACAN) for James F. Bettle, a United States Antarctic Research Program meteorologist and scientific leader at McMurdo Station in 1962.

== Location ==
Bettle Peak is the highest peak of a group of hills that lies to the east of Briggs Hill in the Royal Society Range. The group is bordered by Ferrar Glacier and New Harbour to the north, Overflow Glacier to the west, Blue Glacier to the south and Bowers Piedmont Glacier to the east.

== Glaciers ==
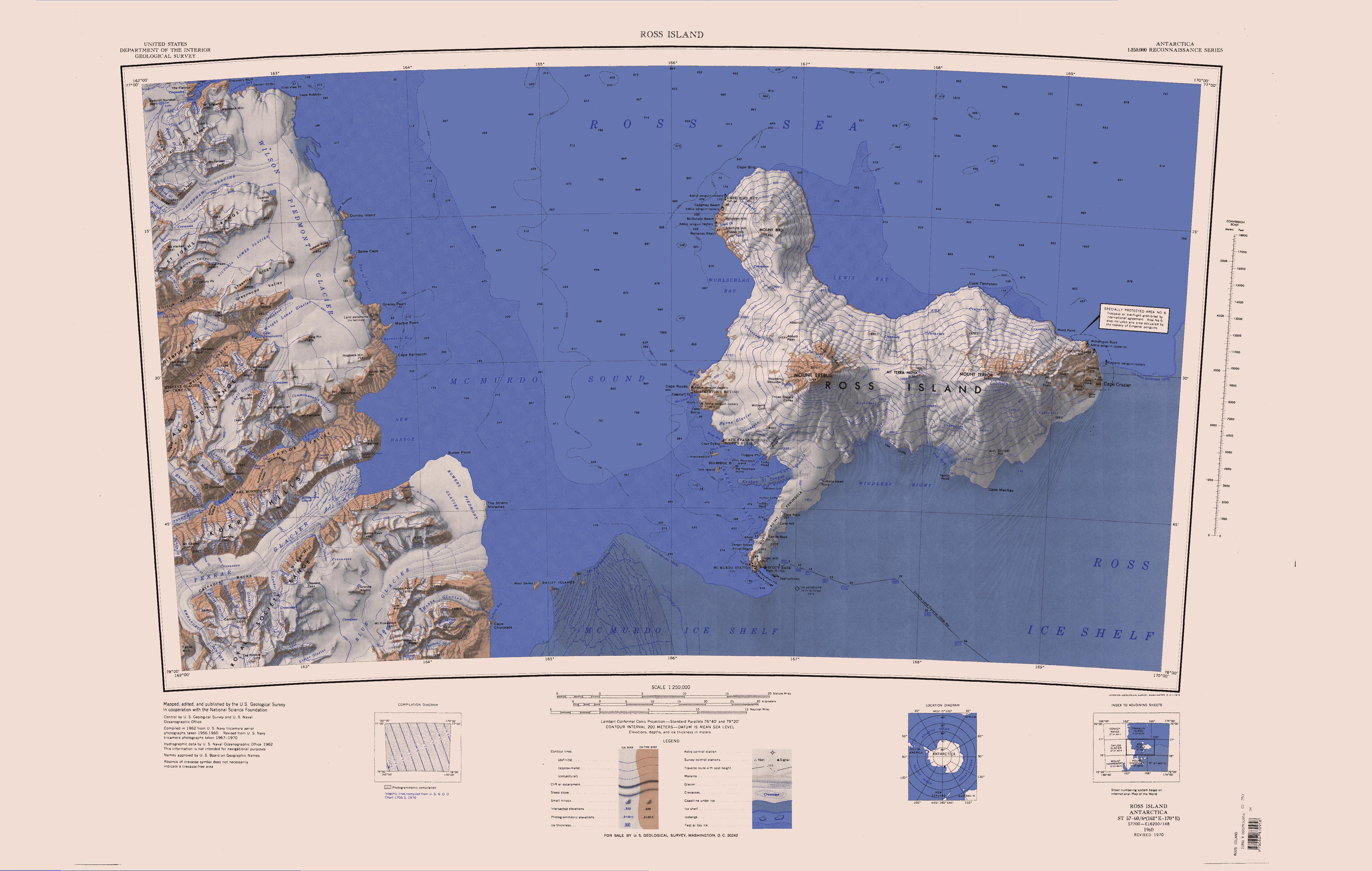
Bettle Peak towards southwest corner of map

=== Herbertson Glacier ===
77°42′S 163°48′E. A small alpine glacier which drains from the cliff that forms the south margin of New Harbour, about 5 nautical miles (9.3 km; 5.8 mi) west-southwest of Butter Point. Named by the BrAE (1910–13), presumably for British geographer Andrew John Herbertson of Oxford University.

=== Amos Glacier ===
77°49′S 163°39′E. A glacier, 3 nautical miles (5.6 km; 3.5 mi) long, flowing southeast from Bettle Peak to a juncture with the Blue Glacier southeast of Hannon Hill. Named in 1992 by US-ACAN after Larry Leon Amos, civil engineer, USGS; member of the USGS two man astronomic surveying team to South Pole Station and Byrd Station in the 1969-70 field season. Among other work, the team established the position of the Geographic South Pole (previously done 1956) and established a tie to the Byrd Ice Strain net which had been under study for several years.

=== Geoid Glacier ===
77°48′S 163°47′E. A glacier flowing south from Thomas Heights, to the west of Ellipsoid Hill, into Blue Glacier. The name is one of a group in the area associated with surveying applied in 1993 by the New Zealand Geographic Board (NZGB). Named from geoid, the particular equipotential surface which coincides with mean sea level.

=== Geodetic Glacier ===
77°45′S 163°48′E. A glacier flowing east from Bettle Peak along the north side of Thomas Heights into Bowers Piedmont Glacier. The name is one of a group in the area associated with surveying applied in 1993 by NZGB. Named from geodesy, the branch of applied mathematics concerned with measuring, or determining the shape of the earth, and the precise location of points on its surface.

== Other features ==
Other features and nearby features include:

=== Stratton Hills ===
77°47′S 163°18′E. Rounded mountains, about 3 nautical miles (5.6 km; 3.5 mi) long and rising to 850 metres (2,790 ft) high, forming the south wall of Ferrar Glazier between Overflow Glacier and the vicinity of Bettle Peak. Named by the NZ-APC at the suggestion of R.H. Findlay, NZARP geologist in the area between 1977 and 1981, after Winthrop Scott Stratton, a New Zealand carpenter who achieved a fortune and devoted most of it to philanthropic causes.

=== Thomas Heights ===
77°47′S 163°52′E. A line of summit ridges that extend from Bettle Peak eastward to the Scott Coast. The feature forms a portion of the divide between the lower ends of Ferrar Glacier and Blue Glacier. Named by the New Zealand Antarctic Place-Names Committee (NZ-APC) in 1983 after Arthur A. Thomas of New Zealand at the suggestion of R.H. Findlay, New Zealand Antarctic Research Programme (NZARP) geologist to the area, 1977–81.

=== Ellipsoid Hill ===
77°48′S 163°49′E. A rounded, partly ice-covered summit 1,130 metres (3,710 ft) high to the north of Blue Glacier, between Geoid Glacier and Spheroid Hill. The name is one of a group in the area associated with surveying applied in 1993 by the NZGB. Named from ellipsoid, in geodesy a mathematical figure formed by revolving an ellipse about its minor axis.

=== Spheroid Hill ===
77°47′S 163°56′E. A mostly ice-free summit 1,230 metres (4,040 ft) high 1 nautical mile (1.9 km; 1.2 mi) east of Ellipsoid Hill, on the north side of Blue Glacier. The name is one of a group in the area associated with surveying applied in 1993 by NZGB. Named from spheroid (sometimes referred to as an ellipsoid), a mathematical figure formed by revolving an ellipse about its minor axis.

=== Robbins Hill ===
77.793596°S 164.07271°E A hill, 3 nautical miles (5.6 km; 3.5 mi) long, which is the east-most rock unit on the north side of the terminus of Blue Glacier. The feature rises to 1,140 metres (3,740 ft) high in the west portion. Named after Rob Robbins, who in 1999 completed 20 consecutive years of deployment to Antarctica in various positions held for three United States Antarctic Project (United States ArmyP) support contractors at McMurdo and Palmer Stations; wintered at McMurdo, 1981 and 1985; construction diver/divemaster, McMurdo and Palmer Stations, 1985–86, 1988–89, 1995–96 seasons; Scientific Diving Coordinator, McMurdo and Palmer Stations, 1996–99 seasons. Mr. Robbins made over 1,000 dives in Antarctica for the United States Antarctic Project (USAP) and supported science in many locations around McMurdo Sound.

== Sources ==
- Alberts, Fred G., ed. (1995), Geographic Names of the Antarctic (PDF) (2 ed.), United States Board on Geographic Names This article incorporates public domain material from websites or documents of the United States Board on Geographic Names.
- "Robbins Hill", Geographic Names Information System, United States Geological Survey, United States Department of the Interior
- Ross Island, USGS: United States Geological Survey

This article incorporates public domain material from websites or documents of the United States Geological Survey.
