= Cathedral Rocks =

Cliffs in Antarctica

Cathedral Rocks'
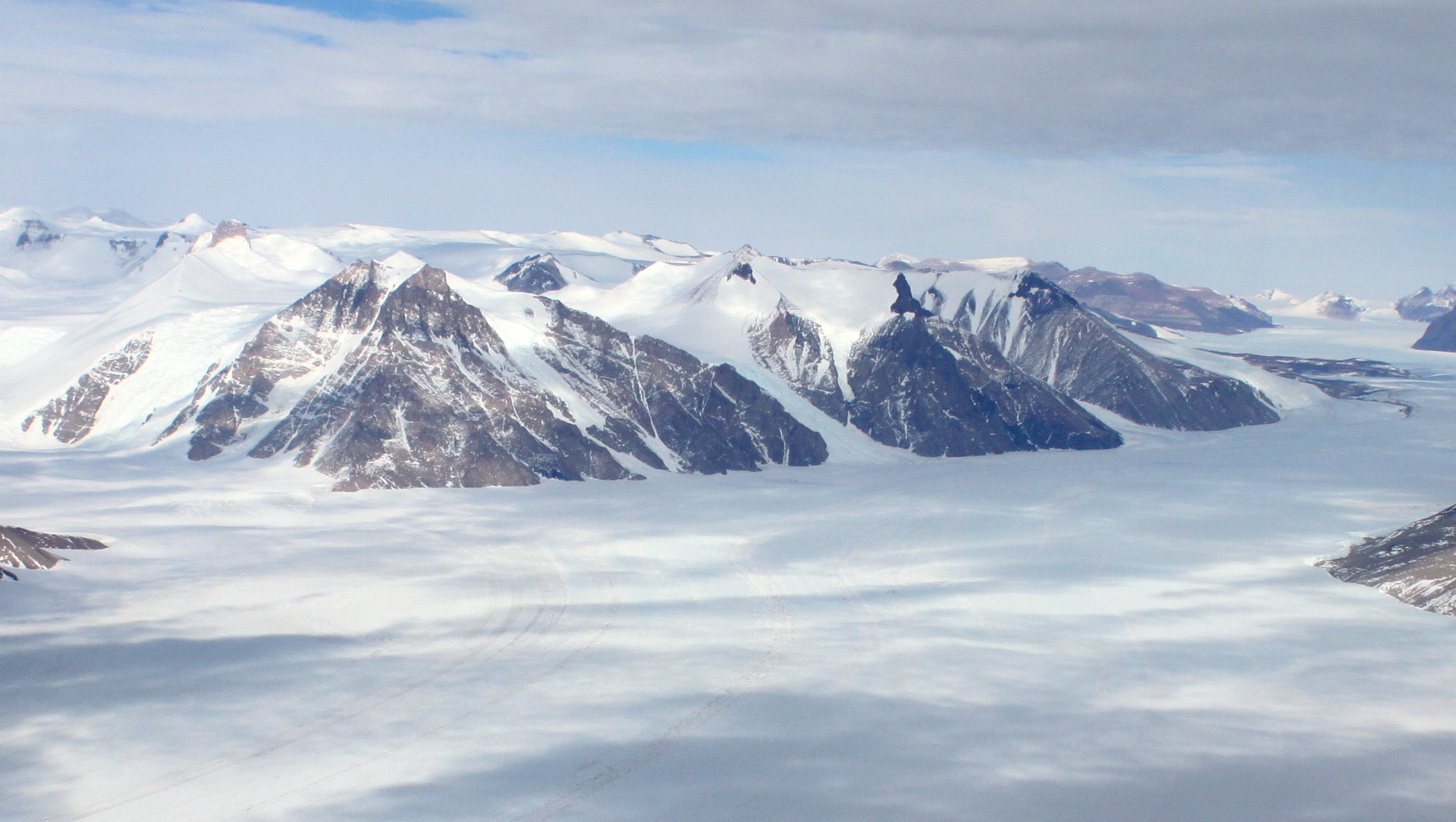
- Cathedral Rocks

Geography
- Location within Antarctica
- Continent: Antarctica
- Region: Victoria Land
- Range coordinates: 77°51′S 162°36′E

The Cathedral Rocks (77°51′S 162°36′E) are a series of four abrupt cliffs interspersed by short glaciers and surmounted by sharp peaks. The cliffs extend for 8 nautical miles (15 km; 9.2 mi) along the south side of Ferrar Glacier and form part of the north shoulder of the Royal Society Range, in Victoria Land, Antarctica.

== Exploration and name ==
The Carhedral Rocks were discovered and named on December 7, 1902, by Lieutenant Albert Armitage, leader of a party of the British National Antarctic Expedition, 1901–04 (BrNAE), that explored this area. The name is descriptive of the feature.

== Location ==
The Cathedral Rocks are in the north of the Royal Society Range, to the south of Ferrar Glacier and the west of Briggs Hill. Emmanuel Glacier flows along their west side, and Condit Glacier flows along their east side. Zoller Glacier, Darkowski Glacier and Bol Glacier flow through the formation. The Camels Hump and The Pimple are south of the rocks.

== Features ==
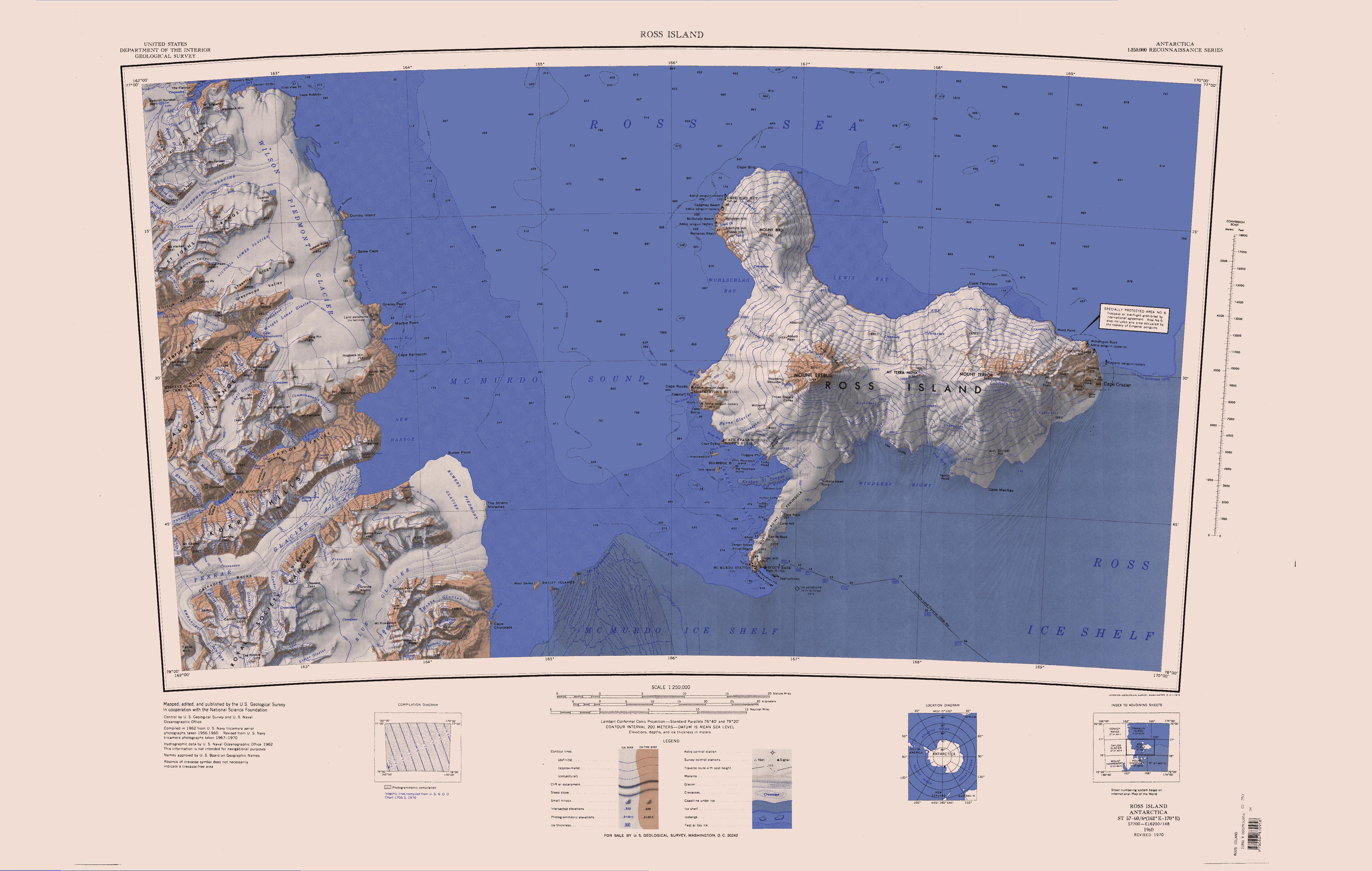
Cathedral Rocks in southwest corner of map

=== Mount Windle ===
77°54′S 162°18′E. An ice-covered peak rising to 1,970 metres (6,460 ft) high on the south side of Ferrar Glacier. It surmounts the most western massif of Cathedral Rocks. Named in 1992 by the United States Advisory Committee on Antarctic Names (US-ACAN) in association with Chaplains Tableland after Lieutenant D.L. Windle, United States Navy, chaplain with the 1963 winter party at McMurdo Station.

=== Mount Fuller ===
77°52′S 162°21′E. A peak in Cathedral Rocks, Royal Society Range, rising to 1,925 metres (6,316 ft) high between the lower portions of Zoller Glacier and Darkowski Glacier. Named in 1992 by US-ACAN in association with Chaplains Tableland (q.v.) after Lieutenant Commander William C. Fuller, United States Navy, chaplain with the 1964 winter party at McMurdo Station.

=== Mount Mignone ===
77°52′S 162°31′E. A peak in Cathedral Rocks rising to 2,025 metres (6,644 ft) high between Darkowski Glacier and Bol Glacier. Named in 1992 by US-ACAN in association with Chaplains Tableland after Lieutenant John C. Mignone, United States Navy, chaplain with the 1966 winter party at McMurdo Station.

=== Mount Essinger ===
77°52′S 162°38′E. A peak rising to 1,905 metres (6,250 ft) high, surmounting the most eastern massif of Cathedral Rocks. Named in 1992 by US-ACAN in association with Chaplains Tableland after Lieutenant Commander Jesse W. Essinger, United States Navy, chaplain with the 1968 winter party at McMurdo Station.

=== Camels Hump ===
77°55′S 162°34′E. Dark bare knob, 2,320 metres (7,610 ft) high, standing 3 nautical miles (5.6 km; 3.5 mi) south of Cathedral Rocks. Discovered and given this descriptive name by the British National Antarctic Expedition (BrNAE) under Scott, 1901–04.

=== Kamb Glacier ===
77°55′S 162°39′E A broad elevated glacier, 4 nautical miles (7.4 km; 4.6 mi) long, flowing northeast from Fogle Peak to enter Condit Glacier. Named in 1992 by US-ACAN after glaciologist Barclay Kamb of the California Institute of Technology; from the 1980s, a principal investigator in USARP studies of the West Antarctic ice sheet, including the drilling of deep boreholes to the base of Siple Coast ice streams; research in order to determine the mechanisms by which the ice streams are able to move at relatively greater speeds than the surrounding ice sheet.

=== Fogle Peak ===
77°57′S 162°34′E A distinctive pointed peak, 2,475 metres (8,120 ft) high, standing at the head of Kamb Glacier. Named in 1992 by US-ACAN after Benson Fogle, Program Manager for Upper Atmospheric Research, Division of Polar Programs, National Science Foundation, 1976–85.

=== Lettau Peak ===
77°57′S 162°30′E. A triangular peak, 2,455 metres (8,054 ft) high, 1 nautical mile (1.9 km; 1.2 mi) west-northwest of Fogle Peak. Named in 1992 by US-ACAN after Bernhard Lettau, Program Manager for Polar Ocean and Climate Sciences in the Office of Polar Programs, National Science Foundation, from 1976.

=== The Pimple ===
77°59′S 162°40′E. Small cone-shaped peak, 3,215 metres (10,548 ft) high, midway between Mount Lister and Camels Hump. Discovered and named by the BrNAE under Scott, 1901–04.

== Sources ==
- Alberts, Fred G., ed. (1995), Geographic Names of the Antarctic (PDF) (2 ed.), United States Board on Geographic Names This article incorporates public domain material from websites or documents of the United States Board on Geographic Names.
- Ross Island, USGS: United States Geological Survey

This article incorporates public domain material from websites or documents of the United States Geological Survey.
