= Anne Hill =

Anne Hill may refer to:

- Anne Hill, Antarctica, a hill on Radian Ridge
- Queen Anne Hill, Seattle
- Anne Hill Carter Lee (1773–1829), née Hill, first lady of Virginia
- Anne Hill (novelist), pseudonym by Netta Muskett
- Lady Anne Hill (née Gathorne-Hardy, 1911–2006), British bookseller
- Anne Hill (actress) (1804–1896), dancer and actress
- Anne T. Hill (1916–1999), American fashion designer and yoga teacher

== See also ==
- Anne Hills (born 1953), American singer-songwriter
- Annie Hill (born 1955), British sailor
- Anna Hill, British radio presenter and journalist.
