= Central Aisle Ridge =

Central Aisle Ridge (78°21′S 163°18′E) is a north–south ridge immediately east of The Stage on the north side of lower Renegar Glacier, Scott Coast. The name is derived from the position of the ridge relative to West Aisle Ridge, East Aisle Ridge, and its proximity to The Stage. It was named by the New Zealand Geographic Board (1994) following work by a New Zealand Geological Survey party to the area, 1977–78.
