= The Stage (Antarctica) =

Coordinates: 78°20′56″S 163°15′26″E

The Stage is a prominent moraine floored amphitheater (a cirque) between West Aisle Ridge and Central Aisle Ridge on the north side of Renegar Glacier, Scott Coast. The cirque floor, at 1,000 metres (3,300 ft), is relatively flat. The feature was visited by D. N. B. Skinner's New Zealand Geological Survey field party, 1977–78, which suggested the name; viewed from the lower Renegar Glacier the elevated floor of the amphitheater appears to be the ideal stage for some great theater.

== See also ==
- Backdrop Ridge
