= Blue Glacier (Antarctica) =

Glacier in Antarctica

- Location within Antarctica
- Type: Mountain glacier
- Location: Victoria Land, Antarctica
- Coordinates: 77°50′S 164°10′E

Blue Glacier (77°50′S 164°10′E) is a large glacier which flows into Bowers Piedmont Glacier about 10 nautical miles (19 km; 12 mi) south of New Harbour, in Victoria Land, Antarctica. It was discovered by the British National Antarctic Expedition (BrNAE) under Robert Falcon Scott, 1901–04, who gave it this name because of its clear blue ice at the time of discovery.

== Location ==
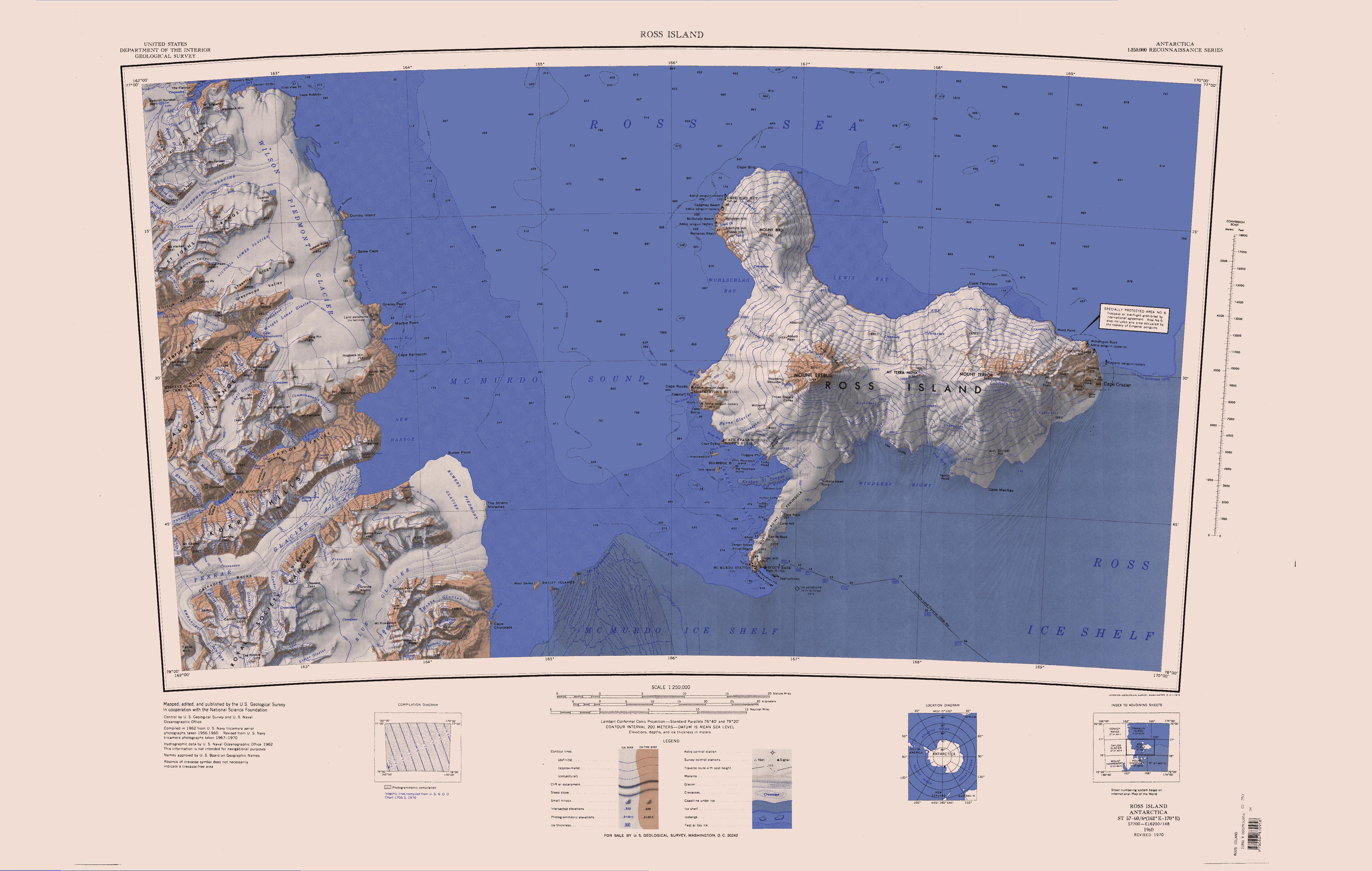
North part of glacier in southwest of map

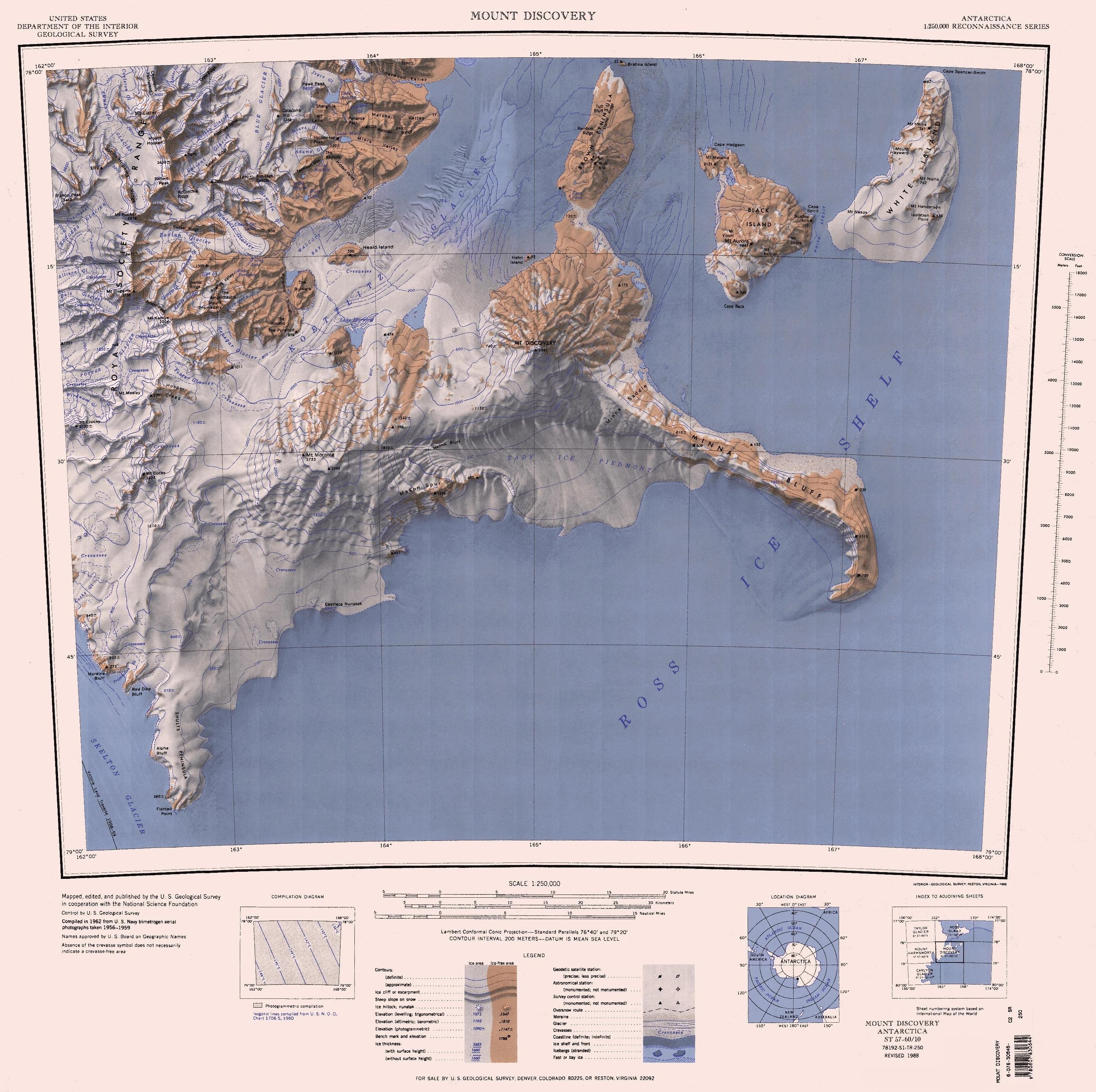
South part of glacier in northwest of map

Blue Glacier rises to the north of Armitage Saddle, and flows north. The coastal range that borders the lower Koettlitz Glacier and the McMurdo Ice Shelf lies to the east, and the Royal Society Range is to the west. In its lower section the Blue Glacier turns to the east and joins the Bowers Piedmont Glacier on the west coast of the McMurdo Sound.

== Left tributary glaciers ==
Glaciers entering from the left (west) flowing from the Royal Society Range, include (from south to north) Salient, Hooker, Mitchell, Spring, Covert, Amos Glacier and Geoid Glacier.

=== Salient Glacier ===
78°06′S 163°05′E. A glacier draining northeast into the head of the Blue Glacier from the slopes of Salient Peak. Surveyed in 1957 by the New Zealand Blue Glacier Party of the Commonwealth Trans-Antarctic Expedition (CTAE, 1956-58). Named after Salient Peak.

=== Bowden Glacier ===
78.1333333°S 163.1166667°E. A glacier lying on the southeast flank of Salient Ridge that flows northeast to Blue Glacier. Named by New Zealand Geographic Board (NZGB) in 1994 for Charles Bowden, first chairman of the Ross Dependency Committee during Sir Edmund Hillary's South Pole Expedition, part of the Commonwealth Trans-Antarctic Expedition (CTAE) in 1957. Bowden also served as a member of the New Zealand Parliament until 1955.

=== Ball Glacier ===
78.05°S 162.8333333°E A glacier 7 nautical miles (13 km; 8.1 mi) long with the head located between Mount Lister and Mount Hooker on the east side of Royal Society Range. The glacier flows northeast between Craw Ridge and Tasman Ridge into Blue Glacier. Named by the NZGB after Gary Ball (see Ball Peak) New Zealand mountaineer who climbed Mount Lister with an Italian field party, 1976-77, and camped on this glacier; field assistant with R. H. Findlay’s New Zealand Antarctic Research Program (NZARP) party to this area, 1980-81.

=== Hooker Glacier ===
78°04′S 163°06′E. A glacier draining northeast into Blue Glacier from the slopes of Mount Hooker. Surveyed in 1957 by the N.Z. Blue Glacier Party of the CTAE (1956-58) and named after Mount Hooker.

=== Mitchell Glacier ===
77°57′S 163°03′E. A glacier which descends steeply from Chaplains Tableland, flowing east-northeast between Transit Ridge and Ibarra Peak to join the Blue Glacier drainage south of Granite Knolls. Named by US-ACAN in 1992 after J. Murray Mitchell (1928-90), climatologist with the United States Weather Bureau and successor agencies, 1955-86; project scientist on climatic change, ES A, 1965-74; senior research climatologist, NOAA, 1974 86; member, Polar Research Board, National Academy of Sciences, 1978-82 (Chairman of Committee on Polar Regions and Climatic Change, 1979-84); member, Advisory Committee to the Division of Polar Programs, NSF, 1988-90.

=== Lister Glacier ===
77°59′S 163°05′E. A glacier on the east side of the Royal Society Range, draining northeast from a large cirque immediately north of Mount Lister. It derives its name from Mount Lister, and was surveyed in 1957 by the New Zealand Blue Glacier Party of the CTAE, 1956-58.

=== Spring Glacier ===
77°55′S 163°06′E. A glacier flowing from the northeast portion of Royal Society Range between Stoner Peak and Transit Ridge, joining the Blue Glacier drainage south of Granite Knolls. Named in 1992 by US-ACAN after Thomas E. Spring, civil engineer, USGS; leader of the USGS two man astronomic surveying team to South Pole Station and Byrd Station in the 1969-70 field season. The team provided support to various science projects, established the position of the Geographic South Pole (previously done 1956), and established a tie to the Byrd Ice Strain net which had been under study for several years.

=== Covert Glacier ===
77°54′S 163°04′E. A glacier flowing from the northeast part of Royal Society Range between Pearsall Ridge and Stoner Peak, joining the Blue Glacier drainage in the vicinity of Granite Knolls. Named in 1992 by US-ACAN after Kathy L. Covert, cartographer, USGS; leader of the two person (satellite surveying, seismology) team at South Pole Station, winter party 1982; senior member of geodetic control party at Minna Bluff, Mount Discovery, White Island, and Beaufort Island, 1986-87 season.

== Right tributary glaciers ==
Glaciers entering from the right (east) flowing from the coastal range, include (from south to north) Gauss, Mollweide, Bonne and Cassini-

=== Gauss Glacier ===
77°58′S 163°45′E. A steep glacier on the north side of Datum Peak, descending west from the southwest extremity of Hobbs Ridge into Blue Glacier, in Victoria Land. Named by the NZGB in 1993 after German mathematician and astronomer Karl Friedrich Gauss.

=== Bonne Glacier ===
77°53′S 163°49′E. A steep glacier 1 nautical mile (1.9 km; 1.2 mi) west-southwest of Hobbs Peak, descending northwest from Hobbs Ridge into Blue Glacier, in Victoria Land. The name is one of a group in the area associated with surveying applied in 1993 by NZGB. Named after the Bonne map projection, a derivative conical projection, in which the parallels are spaced at true distances along meridians which are plotted as curves.

=== Mollweide Glacier ===
77°57′S 163°45′E. A steep glacier 1 nautical mile (1.9 km; 1.2 mi) south of Mount Kowalczyk, descending west from Hobbs Ridge into Blue Glacier. The name is one of a group in the area associated with surveying applied in 1993 by the NZGB. Named from the Mollweide projection, an equal area map projection with the parallels and central meridian being straight lines.

=== Cassini Glacier ===
77°53′S 163°48′E. A steep glacier between Goat Mountain and Bonne Glacier, descending northwest from Hobbs Ridge into Blue Glacier, in Victoria Land. One of a group of names in the area associated with surveying applied in 1993 by NZGB. Named from the Cassini map projection, a cylindrical projection in which the cylinder is at right angles to the axis of the globe.

== Other features ==
=== Brodie Ponds ===
77°57′S 163°40′E. A group of meltwater ponds lying west and southwest of the base of Mount Kowalczyk on the surface of the Blue Glacier. Visited by a NZARP geological party led by R.H. Findlay, 1979-80, and named after Ken Brodie, a geologist with the party.

=== Bowers Piedmont Glacier ===
77°43′S 164°18′E. Piedmont glacier on the coast of Victoria Land, covering about 40 square nautical miles (140 km^{2}; 53 sq mi) and lying just south of New Harbour. It merges at its south side with Blue Glacier. Discovered by the BrNAE (1901-04), but not named until the BrAE (1910-13). Named by Taylor for Lieutenant Henry R. Bowers, who perished with Scott on the return journey from the South Pole.

=== The Strand Moraines ===
77°45′S 164°31′E. An ancient lateral moraine of the Koettlitz Glacier, deposited at the outer edge of Bowers Piedmont Glacier on the west shore of McMurdo Sound. Discovered by the BrNAE (1901-04) and first called "The Eskers." The feature was renamed by Scott in keeping with its true nature.

== Sources ==
- Alberts, Fred G., ed. (1995), Geographic Names of the Antarctic (PDF) (2 ed.), United States Board on Geographic Names This article incorporates public domain material from websites or documents of the United States Board on Geographic Names.
- "Ball Glacier", Geographic Names Information System, United States Geological Survey, United States Department of the Interior
- "Bowden Glacier", Geographic Names Information System, United States Geological Survey, United States Department of the Interior
- Mount Discovery, USGS: United States Geological Survey
- Ross Island, USGS: United States Geological Survey

This article incorporates public domain material from websites or documents of the United States Geological Survey.
