= Mount Lister =

Mountain in Ross Dependency, Antarctica

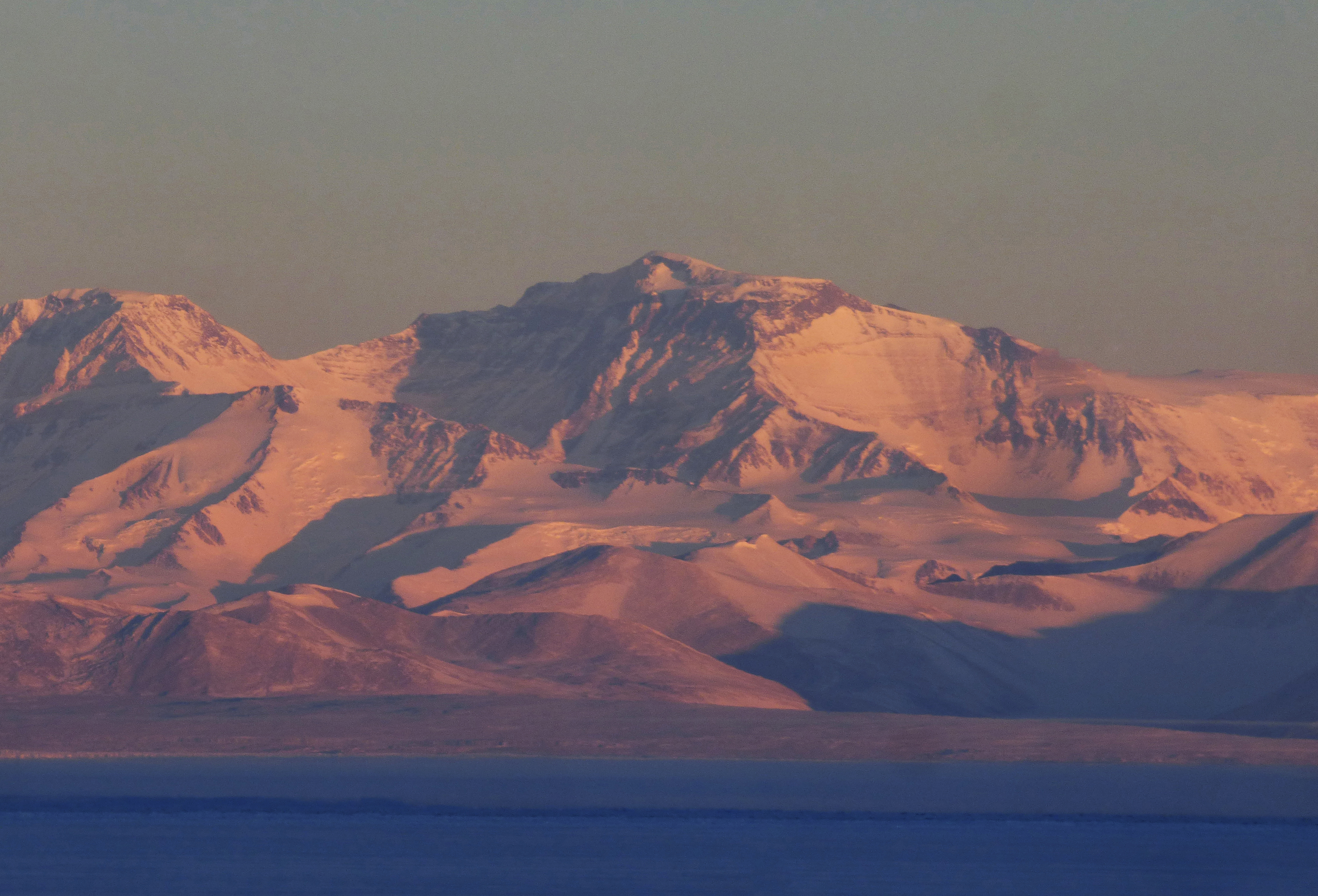
- Mount Lister, seen from Ross Island

Highest point
- Elevation: 4,025 metres (13,200 ft)
- Prominence: 2,191 m (7,188 ft)
- Listing: Ultra, Ribu
- Coordinates: 78°04′S 162°41′E

Geography
- Location within Antarctica
- Location: Victoria Land, Antarctica
- Parent range: Royal Society Range

Mount Lister (78°04′S 162°41′E) is a massive mountain, 4,025 metres (13,205 ft) high, forming the highest point in the Royal Society Range of Victoria Land, Antarctica. It was discovered by the British National Antarctic Expedition (1901–1904) which named it for Lord Joseph Lister, President of the Royal Society, 1895–1900.

== Location ==
Mount Lister is in central Royal Society Range, the highest point on the main north–south ridge that includes The Pimple and Chaplains Tableland to the north and Mount Hooker, Salient Peak and Mount Rücker to the south. McConchie Ridge and Salient Ridge extend east from Salient Peak. Armitage Saddle connects the massif to the Denton Hills to the east. Emmanuel Glacier and its tributary Carleton Glacier run north along the east side of the ridge to Ferrar Glacier. Howchin Glacier flows southeast from the ridge system towards Koettlitz Glacier, while Salient Glacier, Hooker Glacier and Lister Glacier flow northeast into Blue Glacier.

== Features ==
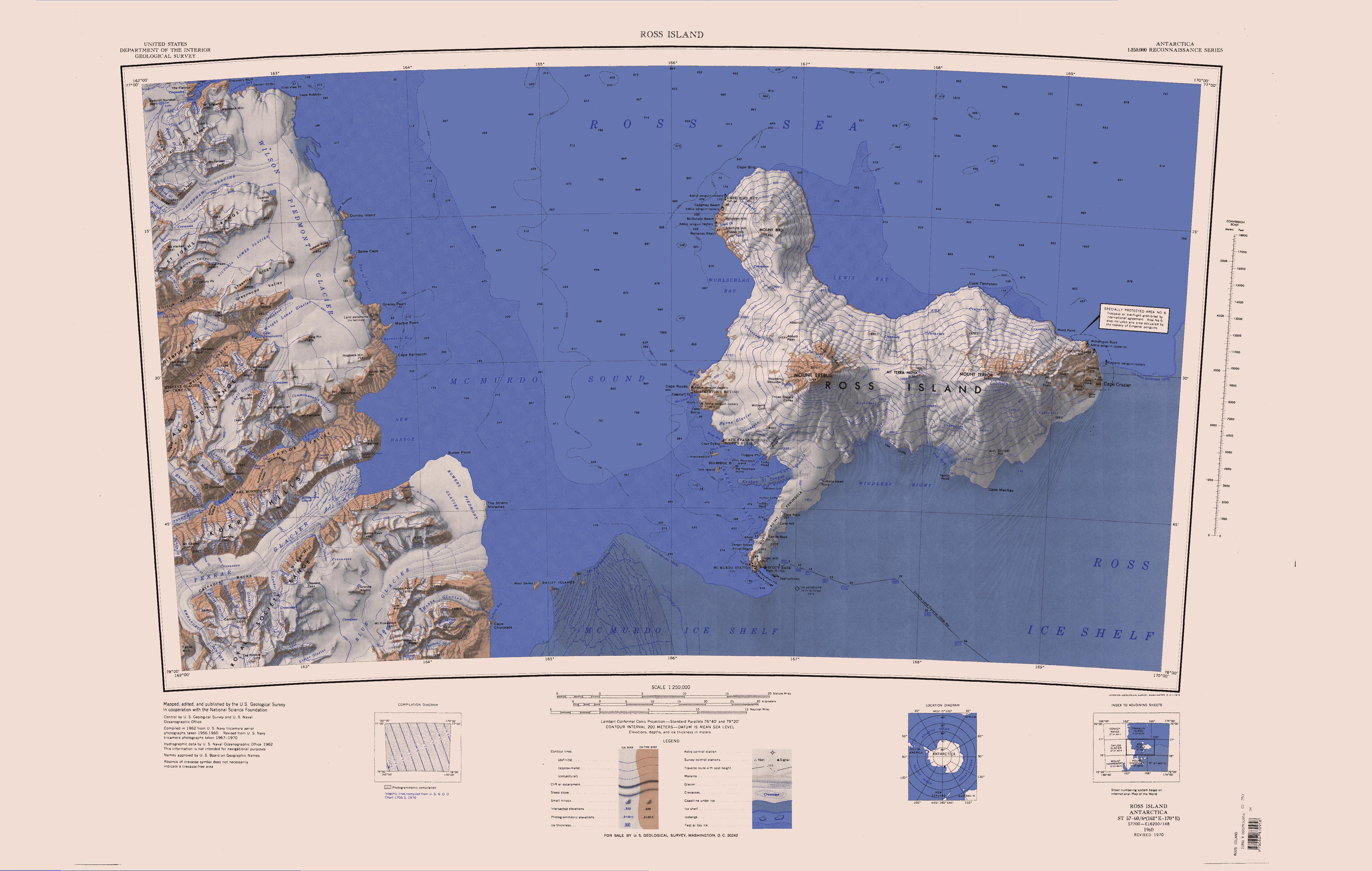
Mount Lister is south of The Pimple in the southwest corner of map

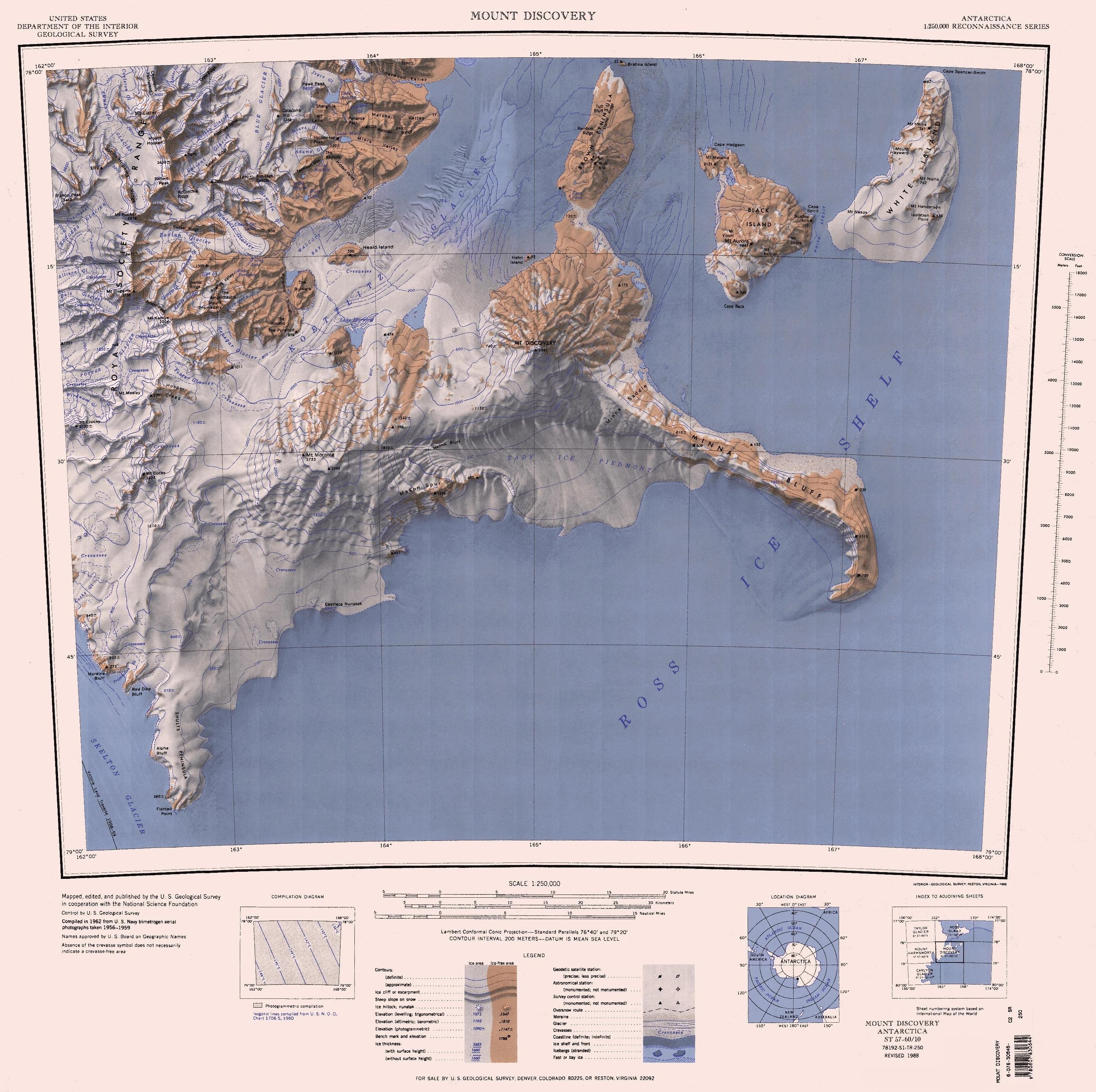
Mount Lister in northwest of map

Features and nearby features include:

=== Transit Ridge ===
77°56′S 163°05′E. A ridge, 4 nautical miles (7.4 km; 4.6 mi) long, extending east from Royal Society Range between Spring Glacier and Mitchell Glacier. The name is one of a group in the area associated with surveying applied in 1993 by NZGB. Named from transit theodolite, a telescope that can be rotated through the vertical position.

=== Telescope Peak ===
77°56′S 163°07′E. The summit peak, 1,270 metres (4,170 ft) high of the east portion of Transit Ridge on the east side of Royal Society Range. The name is one of a group in the area associated with surveying applied in 1993 by NZGB. Named from the refracting telescope as used in surveying; most commonly used as theodolites.

=== Ibarra Peak ===
77°58′S 163°02′E. The summit at the extremity of the ridge which extends east from Royal Society Range between Mitchell Glacier and Lister Glacier. Named in 1992 by US-ACAN after Phillip D. Ibarra, USGS cartographic technician; member of USGS field parties in the 1988–89, 1989–90 and 1990–91 seasons; participated in establishing geodetic control at Ross Island, McMurdo Dry Valleys, South Pole Station and, working from USCGC Polar Star, the Victoria Land coast from Cape Adare to Ross Island.

=== Tuati Peak ===
77°57′S 162°49′E. A peak, 2,595 metres (8,514 ft) high, which rises above the north wall of Mitchell Glacier at the glacier head Named in 1993 by NZGB after Tuati, the Maori name of a sailor known as John Stewart, the first New Zealander to view the icy coast of Antarctica. He sailed on the ship Vincennes, the flagship of the United States Exploring Expedition, 1838–42, led by Lieutenant Charles Wilkes, United States Navy.

=== Heke Peak ===
77°58′S 162°53′E. A peak 2,175 metres (7,136 ft) high on the ridge that forms the south wall of Mitchell Glacier near the glacier head. Named in 1993 by the NZGB after Randal Heke, foreman of the construction unit which built the N.Z. Scott Station in 1957. He remained in a supervisory role for the management of the buildings for many years until his retirement.

=== Mount Chiang ===
77.961888°S 162.654627°E. A distinctive mountain, 2,900 metres (9,500 ft) high, having the appearance of a gablelike projection from the north part of Chaplains Tableland. Named by the United States Advisory Committee on Antarctic Names (US-ACAN) in 1992 after Erick Chiang, Manager, Polar Operations Section, Division of Polar Programs, National Science Foundation, from 1991.

=== Chaplains Tableland ===
78°01′S 162°39′E. A high tableland just north of Mount Lister. Named by the US-ACAN in 1963 in honor of the chaplains who have served in Antarctica, primarily at McMurdo Station. The feature is clearly visible from McMurdo Station.

=== Waikato Spur ===
78.05705°S 162.452048°E A rock spur about 3 nautical miles (5.6 km; 3.5 mi) long, that extends northwestward from Mount Lister. The spur separates the upper part of Emmanuel Glacier from Carleton Glacier. The spur was named by the US-ACAN in 1994 after the University of Waikato in Hamilton, New Zealand, in association with nearby features that are named after colleges and universities.

=== Craw Ridge ===
78°00′S 163°00′E. A prominent ridge that trends northeast from Mount Lister along the south side of Lister Glacier. Named by the New Zealand Antarctic Place-Names Committee (NZ-APC) after D. Craw, a member of a 1980-81 New Zealand Antarctic Research Programme (NZARP) geological party that reached 3,700 metres (12,100 ft) on Mount Lister by way of this ridge.

=== Mount Hooker ===
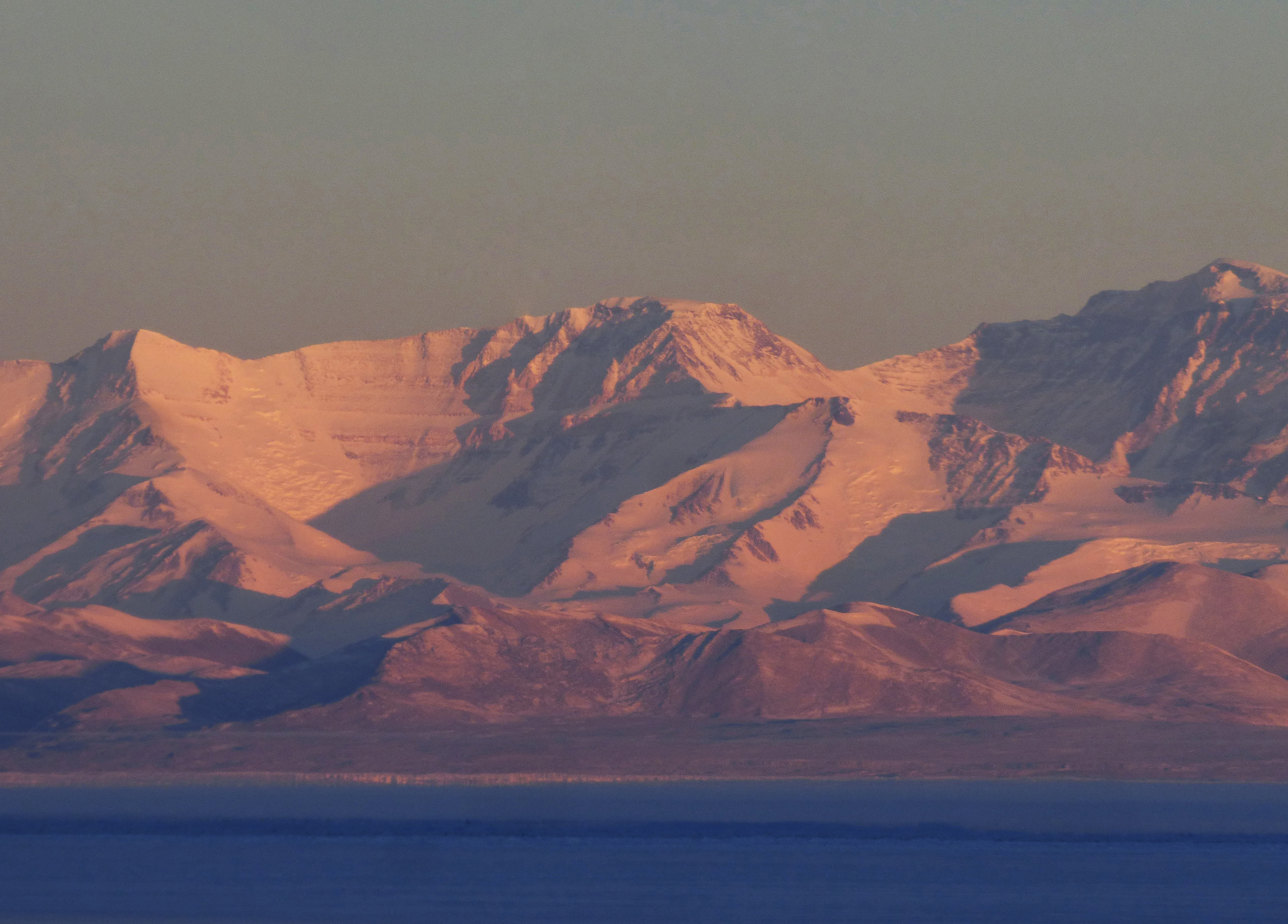
Mount Hooker

78°06′S 162°42′E. Rounded summit over 3,800 metres (12,500 ft) high, standing immediately south of Mount Lister. Discovered by the British National Antarctic Expedition (BrNAE; 1901–04) which named it for Sir Joseph Hooker.

=== Tasman Ridge ===
78.034249°S 163.118729°E. Ridge, 3 nautical miles (5.6 km; 3.5 mi) long, located 10 nautical miles (19 km; 12 mi) northeast of Mount Hooker, bounded on the northwest by Ball Glacier and on the southeast by Hooker Glacier, descending into Blue Glacier. Named by New Zealand Geographic Board (NZGB) in 1994 in association with other names from Aoraki / Mount Cook National Park that are found in this area.

=== Mount Roper ===
78.1191667°S 162.7544444°E. A prominent peak, 3,660 metres (12,010 ft) high, between Mount Hooker and Salient Peak. Named by the New Zealand Geographic Board (1994) after Charles A. (Cas) Roper, member of the summer party at Scott Base, 1976–77; officer-in-charge and senior scientific officer, winter party 1980; New Zealand scientist who oversaw Scott Base laboratory programs for 20 years.

=== Salient Peak ===
78°09′S 162°45′E. A buttressed peak of the Royal Society Range between Mount Rücker and Mount Hooker. A ridge descends eastward from it and forms the watershed between tributaries of the Blue Glacier on the north and Walcott Glacier on the south. So named by the New Zealand Blue Glacier Party of the Commonwealth Trans-Antarctic Expedition (CTAE; 1956–58) because it forms a salient of the Royal Society Range, where the summit turns southwest toward Mount Rücker and Mount Muggins.

== Ridges east of Salient Peak ==
To the east of Salient Peak, Salient Ridge extends northeast and McConchie Ridge extends southeast. A ridge extends due east to Armitage Saddle at the head of Blue Glacier, and from that ridge Chancellor Ridge extends southeast between Howchin Glacier and Walcott Glacier.

=== Salient Ridge ===
78°08′S 163°00′E. A prominent ridge, 6 nautical miles (11 km; 6.9 mi) long, extending east-northeast from Salient Peak along the south side of Salient Glacier. Named in association with the peak and glacier at the suggestion of R.H. Findlay, leader of three NZARP geological parties to the area, 1977–81.

=== Frio Peak ===
78.1333333°S 162.8666667°E. A peak 2,606 metres (8,550 ft) high located 1.5 nautical miles (2.8 km; 1.7 mi) east of Salient Peak on Salient Ridge. Name suggested by K. Brodie, a member of R.H. Findlay's New Zealand Antarctic Research Program (NZARP) field party, 1979–80. “Frio” is the Spanish word for cold and commemorates work conducted in the area in 1979 in piercing cold wind.

=== Copland Pass ===
78°06′S 162°57′E. A pass at about 1,600 metres (5,200 ft) high over Frostbite Spine, the ridge between Hooker Glacier and Salient Glacier. Named after Copland Pass, New Zealand, by R.H. Findlay, leader of a NZARP geological party to the area, 1981–82.

=== Frostbite Spine ===
78°06′S 163°00′E A prominent ridge, 5 nautical miles (9.3 km; 5.8 mi) long, between Hooker Glacier and Salient Glacier. Named by the NZ-APC from a proposal by R.H. Findlay, whose NZARP geological party worked in the area of the ridge in 1979–80. So named because a party member suffered frostbite injury here and had to be replaced.

=== McConchie Ridge ===
78°10′S 162°45′E. A rock spur trending southeast from Salient Peak. Named in 1985 by the NZ-APC after John A. McConchie, field assistant with the NZARP geological party to this area, 1979–80, led by R.H. Findlay. McConchie joined the party as a replacement for Adrian Daly who suffered from frostbite.

=== Poutini Peak ===
78.15°S 163.1°E A peak rising to 2,062 metres (6,765 ft) at the south side of Bowden Glacier. It stands 1 nautical mile (1.9 km; 1.2 mi) west of Murihau Peak on the west–east ridge marking the head of Blue Glacier. Named by the New Zealand Geographic Board (NZGB) in 1994. Poutini is the guardian taniwha of the essence of New Zealand greenstone.

=== Murihau Peak ===
78.1333333°S 163.1666667°E. A peak 1.5 nautical miles (2.8 km; 1.7 mi) west of Armitage Saddle. It rises to 2,026 metres (6,647 ft) on the west–east ridge at the head of Blue Glacier. Named by NZGB in 1994. Murihau is a Maori name meaning “area of gentle breeze.”

=== Armitage Saddle ===
78°09′S 163°15′E. The saddle at the head of Blue Glacier, overlooking the Howchin Glacier and Walcott Glacier which drain toward Walcott Bay in the Koettlitz Glacier. The saddle is at the south end of the "Snow Valley" (upper part of Blue Glacier) mapped by Armitage in 1902, and subsequently wrongly omitted from maps of the BrAE, 1910–13. The New Zealand Blue Glacier Party of the CTAE, 1956–58, established a survey station on the saddle in September 1957. They named it for Lieutenant A.B. Armitage, second-in-command of the BrNAE, 1901–04, in recognition of his exploration in this area.

=== Chancellor Ridge ===
78.2°S 163.2°E. A ridge between Walcott Glacier and Howchin Glacier. Named by New Zealand Geographic Board (NZGB) (1994) in association with Chancellor Lakes near the east end of the ridge.

=== Chancellor Lakes ===
78°13′S 163°18′E. Small twin lakes near the crest of the ridge north of the Walcott Glacier. Named by the New Zealand University of Wellington Antarctic Expedition, 1960–61, in honor of the chancellor of that university.

=== Brandau Crater ===
78.2°S 163.3666667°E. An ice-free volcanic crater lying to the south of the snout of Howchin Glacier on Chancellor Ridge. Named by NZGB (1994) after Lieutenant Cmdr. James F. Brandau, U.S. Navy (USN), Squadron VX-6 helicopter pilot in the area, 1964 and 1965.

== See also ==
- List of ultras of Antarctica

== Sources ==
- Alberts, Fred G., ed. (1995), Geographic Names of the Antarctic (PDF) (2 ed.), United States Board on Geographic Names This article incorporates public domain material from websites or documents of the United States Board on Geographic Names.
- Antarctica Ultra-Prominences, Peaklist.org
- "Brandau Crater", Geographic Names Information System, United States Geological Survey, United States Department of the Interior
- "Chancellor Ridge", Geographic Names Information System, United States Geological Survey, United States Department of the Interior
- "Frio Peak", Geographic Names Information System, United States Geological Survey, United States Department of the Interior
- "Mount Chiang", Geographic Names Information System, United States Geological Survey, United States Department of the Interior
- Mount Discovery, USGS: United States Geological Survey
- "Mount Roper", Geographic Names Information System, United States Geological Survey, United States Department of the Interior
- "Murihau Peak", Geographic Names Information System, United States Geological Survey, United States Department of the Interior
- "Poutini Peak", Geographic Names Information System, United States Geological Survey, United States Department of the Interior
- Ross Island, USGS: United States Geological Survey
- "Tasman Ridge", Geographic Names Information System, United States Geological Survey, United States Department of the Interior
- "Waikato Spur", Geographic Names Information System, United States Geological Survey, United States Department of the Interior

This article incorporates public domain material from websites or documents of the United States Geological Survey.
