= Mount Band =

Mountain in Ross Dependency, Antarctica

Mount Band (78°3′S 163°58′E) is a mountain on the Scott Coast of Victoria Land. Its name stems from the profusion of colored lichens appearing in bands on brown rocks in the mountains of Victoria Land in Antarctica.
