= Tuttell Point =

Cape in Heald Island, Antarctica

Coordinates: 78°15′35″S 163°50′48″E

Tuttell Point is a cape that is located on the center of the southern shore of Heald Island Antarctica. Heald Island is 3 miles (4.8 km) long, and is completely surrounded by the Koettlitz Glacier.

Tuttell Point was named for Lieutenant Commander Robert J. Tuttell of the United States Navy. He was a Naval Aviator in Antarctic Development Squadron Six (VXE-6) who flew logistics missions, including several high profile missions, in a ski-equipped LC-130 Hercules aircraft. He flew missions in Antarctica during the Antarctic Summer Seasons from 1983 to 1986 in support of Operation Deep Freeze. He also flew Winter Fly In (WINFLY) missions in 1984 and 1985. The feature's name was approved on October 23, 2012 by the Advisory Committee on Antarctic Names, of the U.S. Board on Geographic Names.
