= Heald Island =

Island in Antarctica

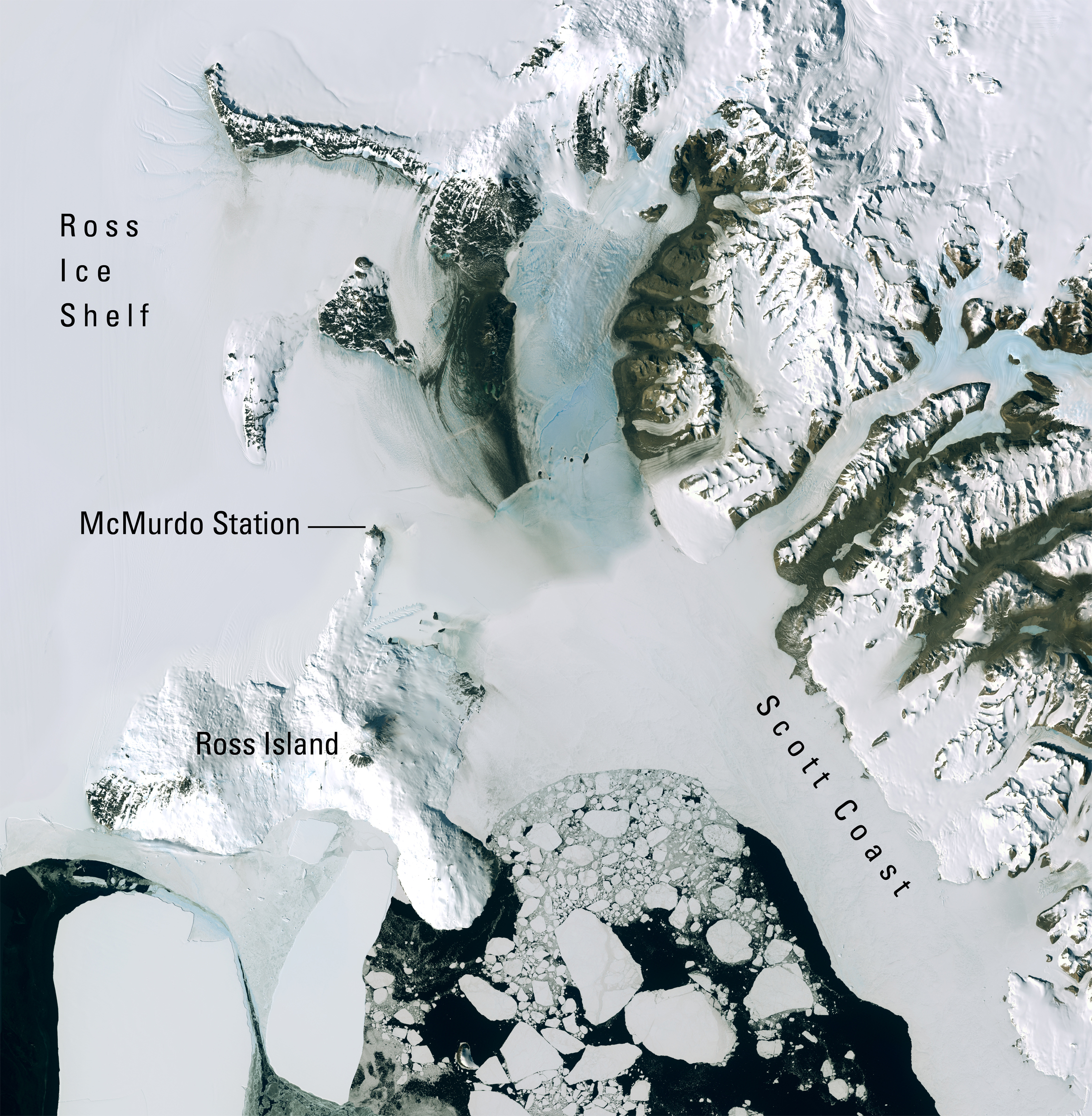
Heald Island is located near McMurdo Station. The island is surrounded by the large blue ice Koettitz Glacier and can be seen near the top center of this picture. Tuttell Point is a cape located on Heald Island.

Heald Island (78°15′S 163°49′E) is an island, 3 miles (5 km) long and 555 metres (1,820 ft) high, which projects through the ice of Koettlitz Glacier just east of Walcott Bay, in Victoria Land, Antarctica. It was discovered and named by the British National Antarctic Expedition (1901–04) for Seaman William L. Heald, a member of the expedition who saved the life of Hartley T. Ferrar when the latter was suffering from scurvy in 1902. In 2012 a cape on Heald Island was named Tuttell Point. The point is on the central part of the southern shore of Heald Island jutting into Koettlitz Glacier, 7.3 miles northwest of Gandalf Ridge, and approximately 10 miles west of Discovery Glacier. The feature is named by US-ACAN BGN for Lieutenant Commander Robert Joseph Tuttell, a Naval Aviator in Antarctic Development Squadron Six (VXE-6).

== See also ==
- List of antarctic and sub-antarctic islands
