= Scott Coast =

Portion of coast in Antarctica

Coordinates: 76°30′S 162°30′E

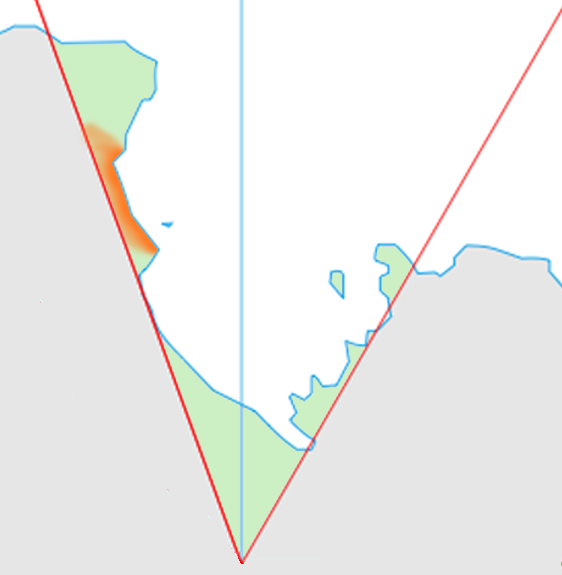
Location of the Scott Coast (marked in orange) within the Ross Dependency

Scott Coast () is the portion of the coast of Victoria Land, Antarctica between Cape Washington and Minna Bluff. It was named by the New Zealand Antarctic Place-Names Committee in 1961 after Captain Robert Falcon Scott, Royal Navy, leader of the Discovery Expedition (1901–1904) and the British Antarctic Expedition (1910–1913), who died on the return journey from the South Pole. Much of the early exploration of this coastline was accomplished by Scott and his colleagues, and many of the names in the region were bestowed by him.

== Localities ==
- Blue Glacier
- Dreschhoff Peak
- Mount Band
- Nostoc Flats
- Robbins Hill
- Stoner Peak
- Weidner Ridge
