= Radian Ridge =

Ridge in Antarctica

- Location within Antarctica

Highest point
- Coordinates: 78.23333°S 162.66667°E

Geography
- Location: Victoria Land, Antarctica
- Parent range: Royal Society Range

Radian Ridge (78.23333°S 162.66667°E) is a ridge extending east from the scarp of the Royal Society Range, along the south side of Radian Glacier in Antarctica. It was named in association with Radian Glacier.

== Features ==
=== Lava Tongue Pass ===
78.2333333°S 162.6833333°E A prominent north-south gully at 1,850 metres (6,070 ft) high bisecting Radian Ridge. Named descriptively by New Zealand Geographic Board (NZGB) (1994) following work in the area by a NZGS field party, 1977-78, for a lava flow that fills the pass.

=== Anne Hill ===
78.2333333°S 162.7166667°E The most prominent hill on Radian Ridge. It rises to 2,079 metres (6,821 ft) high at the east side of Lava Tongue Pass. Named after Anne C. Wright (later Anne Wright-Grassham), a geologist with the New Zealand Geological Survey field party in this area, 1977-78; geologist with United States Antarctic Research Program (United States ArmyRP) field parties, 1982-83, 1983-84, and 1985-86 seasons, with work at Ross Island, Minna Bluff, Mount Discovery, Mount Morning, and Mason Spur.

=== Boom Basin ===
78.2333333°S 162.8°E A small basin on the north side of Radian Ridge, immediately west of the confluence of Pipecleaner Glacier and Radian Glacier, Royal Society Range. A loud explosive boom was heard by members of a NZGS field party working in the area on December 3, 1977. They suggested the name. The source of the noise remained a mystery.

=== Horseshoe Crater ===
78.2333333°S 162.8833333°E A volcanic crater at the confluence of Radian Glacier and Pipecleaner Glacier. Named descriptively by New Zealand Geographic Board (NZGB) (1994) following work in the area by a NZGS field party, 1977-78, from the horseshoe shape of the crater.

== Sources ==
- "Anne Hill", Geographic Names Information System, United States Geological Survey, United States Department of the Interior
- "Boom Basin", Geographic Names Information System, United States Geological Survey, United States Department of the Interior
- "Horseshoe Crater", Geographic Names Information System, United States Geological Survey, United States Department of the Interior
- "Lava Tongue Pass", Geographic Names Information System, United States Geological Survey, United States Department of the Interior
- Radian Ridge, AADC: Australian Antarctic Data Centre

This article incorporates public domain material from websites or documents of the United States Geological Survey.
