= Dreschhoff Peak =

Mountain in Antarctica

Dreschhoff Peak (78°1′S 161°5′E) in Antarctica is named after Gisela A.M. Dreschhoff, a physicist at the Space Technology Center, University of Kansas, who conducted radioactivity surveys and other field work in various parts of Antarctica, including Victoria Land, for 11 field seasons, 1976–89.
