= Bowers Piedmont Glacier =

Glacier in Antarctica

- Location within Antarctica
- Type: piedmont glacier
- Location: Victoria Land, Antarctica
- Coordinates: 77°43′S 164°14′E

Bowers Piedmont Glacier is a piedmont glacier on the coast of Victoria Land, covering about 40 square miles (100 km^{2}) and lying just south of New Harbour. It merges at its south side with Blue Glacier.

It was discovered by the British National Antarctic Expedition, 1901–04, but not named until the British Antarctic Expedition, 1910–13, when Thomas Griffith Taylor named it for Lieutenant Henry R. Bowers, who perished with Robert F. Scott on the return journey from the South Pole.
