= Briggs Hill =

Hill in Antarctica

- Location within Antarctica

Highest point
- Coordinates: 77°49′S 163°0′E

Geography
- Continent: Antarctica
- Region: Victoria Land

Briggs Hill (77°49′S 163°0′E) is a conspicuous ice-free hill, 1,210 metres (3,970 ft) high, standing on the south side of Ferrar Glacier between Descent Glacier and Overflow Glacier in Victoria Land, Antarctica. It was charted by the British Antarctic Expedition, 1910–13, under Scott, and named by the United States Advisory Committee on Antarctic Names (US-ACAN) for Raymond S. Briggs, United States Antarctic Research Program meteorologist at McMurdo Station in 1962, and station scientific leader there in 1963.

== Location ==
Briggs Hill is in the northeast of the Royal Society Range. It faces Ferrar Glacier to the northwest. and is bound by the Descent Glacier to the southwest and the Overflow Glacier to the northeast. Descent Pass is to the southeast, leading towards Granite Knolls and the Blue Glacier.

== Features ==
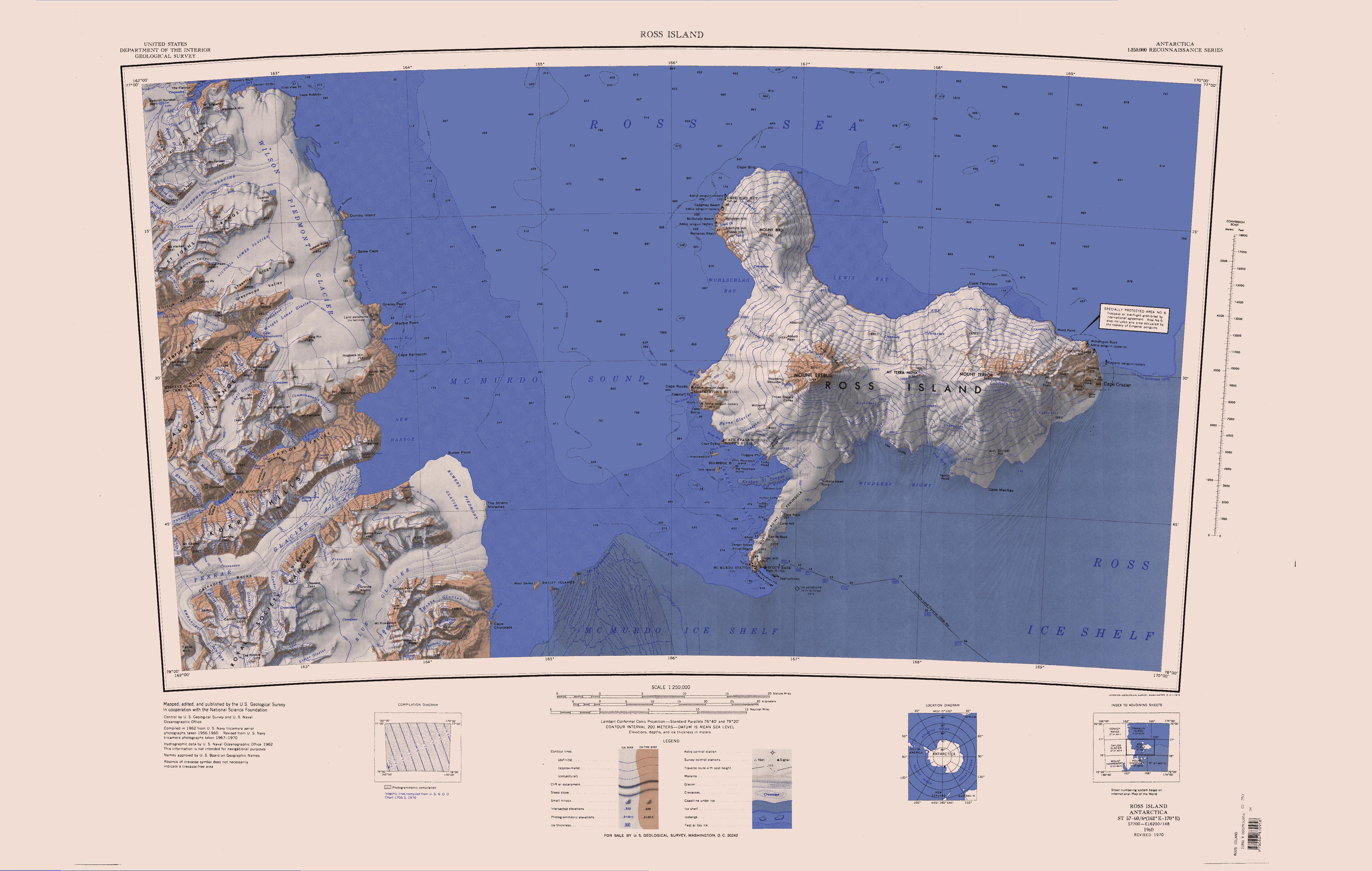
Briggs Hill towards southwest corner of map

Features and nearby features include:

=== Mount Huxley ===
77°51′S 162°52′E. A mountain, 1,155 metres (3,789 ft) high, between lower Condit Glacier and Descent Glacier, marginal to Ferrar Glacier. Named in 1992 by US-ACAN after Leonard Huxley, editor of Scott's Last Expedition, two volumes, London, 1913; Volume I being the journals of Capt. R.F. Scott, RN; Volume II being the reports of journeys and scientific work undertaken by E.A. Wilson and the surviving members of the expedition. The work has long been acclaimed among narrative reports to come out of the heroic era.

=== Todd Hill ===
77°51′S 163°03′E. . A bluff type elevation 1,245 metres (4,085 ft) high which forms the south extremity of the Briggs Hill massif and the north point of entrance to Descent Pass (leading to Ferrar Glacier). Named in 1992 by the United States Advisory Committee on Antarctic Names (US-ACAN) after Ronald L. Todd, cartographer, United States Geological Survey (USGS); member of the USGS field team which established geodetic control in the Hudson Mountains, Jones Mountains, Thurston Island and Farwell Island areas of Walgreen Coast and Eights Coast during the 1968-69 season.

=== Descent Pass ===
A pass leading from Blue Glacier to Ferrar Glacier. So named by the party led by Armitage of the British National Antarctic Expedition (BrNAE; 1901-04) because of the adventurous descent to Ferrar Glacier made here via Descent Glacier in 1902.

=== Pearsall Ridge ===
77°52′S 163°06′E. A ridge, for the most part ice covered, which extends east-northeast from Royal Society Range between Descent Pass and Covert Glacier. Named in 1992 by US-ACAN after Richard A. Pearsall, cartographer, USGS; member of the USGS geodetic control party to the Ellsworth Mountains in the 1979-80 season; additional work during the season at South Pole Station, determining the true position of the Geographic South Pole.

=== Stoner Peak ===
77°54′S 163°06′E. A distinctive peak, 1,300 metres (4,300 ft) high, surmounting the east extremity of the ridge between Covert Glacier and Spring Glacier and forming its highest point. Named by US-ACAN after James E. Stoner, cartographer, USGS; active in geodetic control planning and data reduction in USGS from 1981; member of USGS geodetic control teams in McMurdo Dry Valleys during the 1986-87 and 1989-90 field seasons; team leader, 1989-90, with additional control work in remote sites working from U.S. icebreakers.

=== Granite Knolls ===
77°53′S 163°29′E. Conspicuous rock outcrops on the northwest flank of Blue Glacier, 5 nautical miles (9.3 km; 5.8 mi) west of Hobbs Peak. This descriptive name was given by the British Antarctic Expedition, 1910–13 (BrAE) under Scott.Jones Mountains, Thurston Island and Harwell Island areas of Walgreen Coast and Eights Coast during the 1968-69 season.

=== Anderson Knoll ===
77°54′S 163°26′E. The southernmost nunatak in Granite Knolls, 1 nautical mile (1.9 km; 1.2 mi) south of the main massif and marginal to Blue Glacier. Named by US-ACAN after Klaus G. Anderson (d. 1991), civil engineering technician, USGS, 1960-90; member of the United States Geological Survey (USGS) field team which established geodetic control in the Hudson Mountains, Jones Mountains, Thurston Island and Harwell Island areas of Walgreen Coast and Eights Coast during the 1968-69 season.

=== Chain Nunataks ===
77°50′S 163°24′E. A linear series of nunataks to the west of Blue Glacier, running west-northwest–east-southeast for 3.5 nautical miles (6.5 km; 4.0 mi) between Briggs Hill and Hannon Hill. The name is one of a group in the area associated with surveying applied in 1993 by the NZGB. Named with reference to a surveyor's chain.

=== Hannon Hill ===
77°50′S 163°38′E. A bare rock hill (110 metres (360 ft) high on the west side of the terminus of Amos Glacier, at the juncture with Blue Glacier. Named in 1992 by US-ACAN after Timothy J. Hannon, cartographer, USGS; leader of the two man USGS team working jointly out of Vanda Station with a N.Z. team in the 1988-89 season to establish new geodetic controls and observe old stations in the McMurdo Dry Valleys; relocated the position of the Geographic South Pole.

== Sources ==
- Alberts, Fred G., ed. (1995), Geographic Names of the Antarctic (PDF) (2 ed.), United States Board on Geographic Names This article incorporates public domain material from websites or documents of the United States Board on Geographic Names.
- Ross Island, USGS: United States Geological Survey

This article incorporates public domain material from websites or documents of the United States Geological Survey.
