= New Harbour (Antarctica) =

Body of water in Antarctica

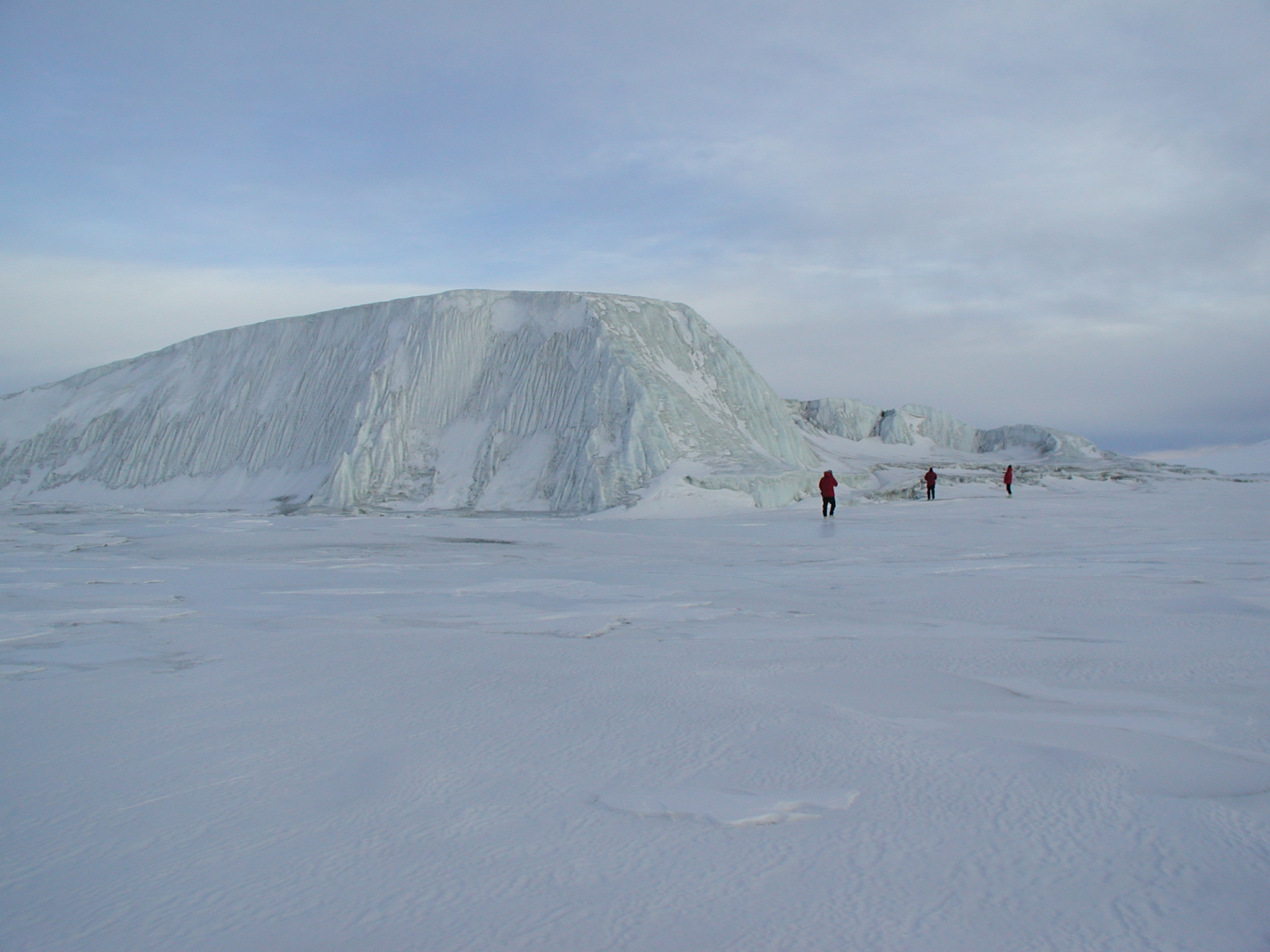
- A stamukha in New Harbor

- Location within Antarctica
- Coordinates: 77°36′S 163°51′E
- Ocean/sea sources: Ross Sea

New Harbour (77°36′S 163°51′E) is a bay about 10 nautical miles (19 km; 12 mi) wide between Cape Bernacchi and Butter Point along the coast of Victoria Land, due west of Ross Island.

== Exploration and naming ==
New Harbour was discovered by the British National Antarctic Expedition (BrNAE; 1901–04) and so named because this new harbor was found while the Discovery was seeking the farthest possible southern anchorage along the coast of Victoria Land.

== Location ==
New Harbour opens into McMurdo Sound opposite Ross Island, between Cape Bernacchi to the north and Butter Point to the south. The Wilson Piedmont Glacier is to the north of New Harbour and the Bowers Piedmont Glacier is to the south. To the west, the Kukri Hills extend into the harbour to the north of Ferrar Glacier, which empties into the harbour.

== Features ==
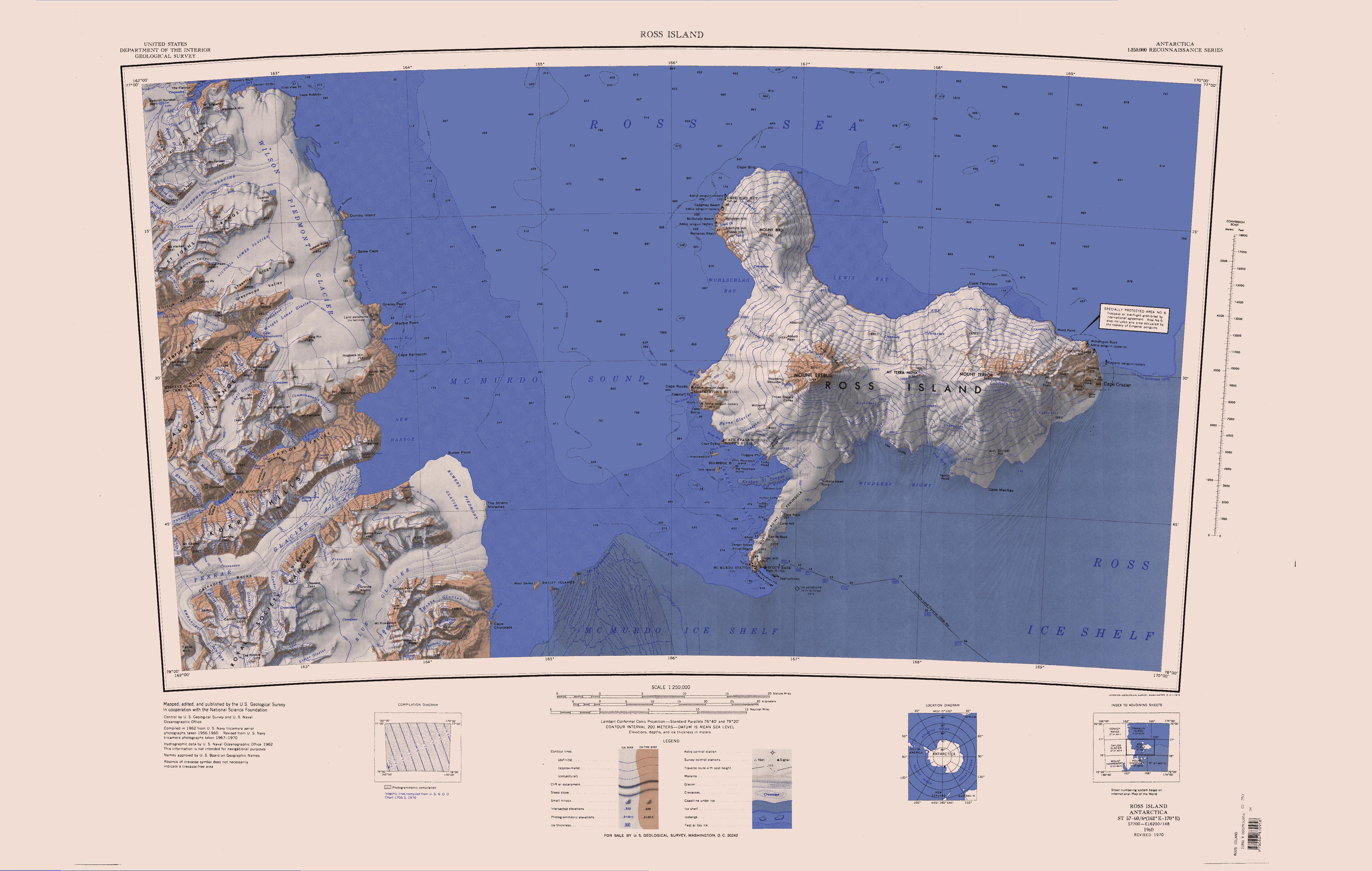
New Harbour to the east, opposite Ross Island

Features include, from north to south, include:

=== Cape Bernacchi ===
77°29′S 163°51′E. A rocky cape between Bernacchi Bay and New Harbor. Discovered by the BrNAE, 1901-04, under Scott, and named by him for Louis C. Bernacchi, physicist with the expedition.

=== McClintock Point ===
77.546166°S 163.665496°E A point at the north side of the entrance to Explorers Cove, New Harbor. Named by the United States Advisory Committee on Antarctic Names (US-ACAN) (1997) after James B. McClintock, Associate Professor of Biology, University of Alabama, Birmingham, who studied the benthos of McMurdo Sound west of Ross Island and along the coast from Granite Harbor to Cape Chocolate, including extensive work in New Harbor in proximity to this point.

=== Quinn Gully ===
77.536575°S 163.530679°E A mainly ice-free gully, descending between MacDonald Hills and Hjorth Hill to Explorers Cove, New Harbor. Named by US-ACAN (1997) after Thomas Quinn, Supervisor of Continental Air Operations, Antarctic Support Associates.

=== Explorers Cove ===
77°34′S 163°35′E. A cove at the northwest head of New Harbor. The name was applied by the US-ACAN in 1976 in recognition of the large number of explorers that have worked in the vicinity of this cove.

=== Wales Stream ===
77°35′S 163°30′E. A meltwater stream that drains from Wales Glacier to Explorers Cove. The name was used by N.Z. geologist Burton Murrell in 1973, but he attributes it to an earlier use by C.G. Vucetich and H.W. Wellman.

=== Marinovic Beach ===
77°35′S 163°34′E. A gently sloping beach on the south shore of Explorers Cove. Named by US-ACAN after Baldo Marinovic, graduate student (biology), University of California, Santa Cruz, and member of the 1985 winter party at McMurdo Station. During 1984-85, the sea off this beach was a site for the study of reproductive biology and larval ecology of shallow-water echinoderms by biologists of the University of California, Santa Cruz. The name came into local use following the selection of the beach by Marinovic, correctly, as a likely place to study echinoderms.

=== Baker Point ===
77.576349°S 163.559615°E A point at the south side of the entrance to Explorers Cove. Named by US-ACAN (1997) after Bill James Baker, Associate Professor of Chemistry, Florida Institute of Technology, Melbourne, FL, who conducted underwater research in several areas of McMurdo Sound during the 1992-93, 1993-94 and 1996-97 field seasons, including work at Cape Evans, Razorback Islands, Hutton Cliffs, Arrival Heights, and New Harbor, the location of this point.

=== Weatherwax Glacier ===
77.636966°S 163.591101°E A glacier which occupies the elevated basin south of Mount Barnes. It drains southeast from 800 metres (2,600 ft) high elevation and terminates in a narrow glacial snout on rock bluffs 200 metres (660 ft) high above New Harbor. Named by US-ACAN (2000) after Allan T. Weatherwax, physicist, Institute of Physical Science and Technology, University of Maryland, who conducted investigations of the atmosphere, ionosphere, and magnetosphere at McMurdo Station, South Pole Station, and several of the Automated Geophysical Observatories (AGOs) located on the Antarctic plateau; completed 10 field seasons in Antarctica, 1988-89 through 1998-99.

=== Butter Point ===
77°39′S 164°14′E. A low point forming the south side of the entrance to New Harbour. Discovered by the BrNAE (1901-04) under Scott. So named by them because the Ferrar Glacier party left a tin of butter here, in anticipation of obtaining fresh seal meat at this point on the return journey.

== Sources ==
- Alberts, Fred G., ed. (1995), Geographic Names of the Antarctic (PDF) (2 ed.), United States Board on Geographic Names This article incorporates public domain material from websites or documents of the United States Board on Geographic Names.
- "Baker Point", Geographic Names Information System, United States Geological Survey, United States Department of the Interior
- "McClintock Point", Geographic Names Information System, United States Geological Survey, United States Department of the Interior
- "Quinn Gully", Geographic Names Information System, United States Geological Survey, United States Department of the Interior
- Ross Island, USGS: United States Geological Survey
- "Weatherwax Glacier", Geographic Names Information System, United States Geological Survey, United States Department of the Interior

This article incorporates public domain material from websites or documents of the United States Geological Survey.
