= West Aisle Ridge =

West Aisle Ridge (78°20′S 163°12′E) in Antarctica is a named from the position of the ridge in a group of three ridges in relation to The Stage.
