= Jesse Handsley =

Royal Navy able seamen and Antarctic explorer (1876-1916)

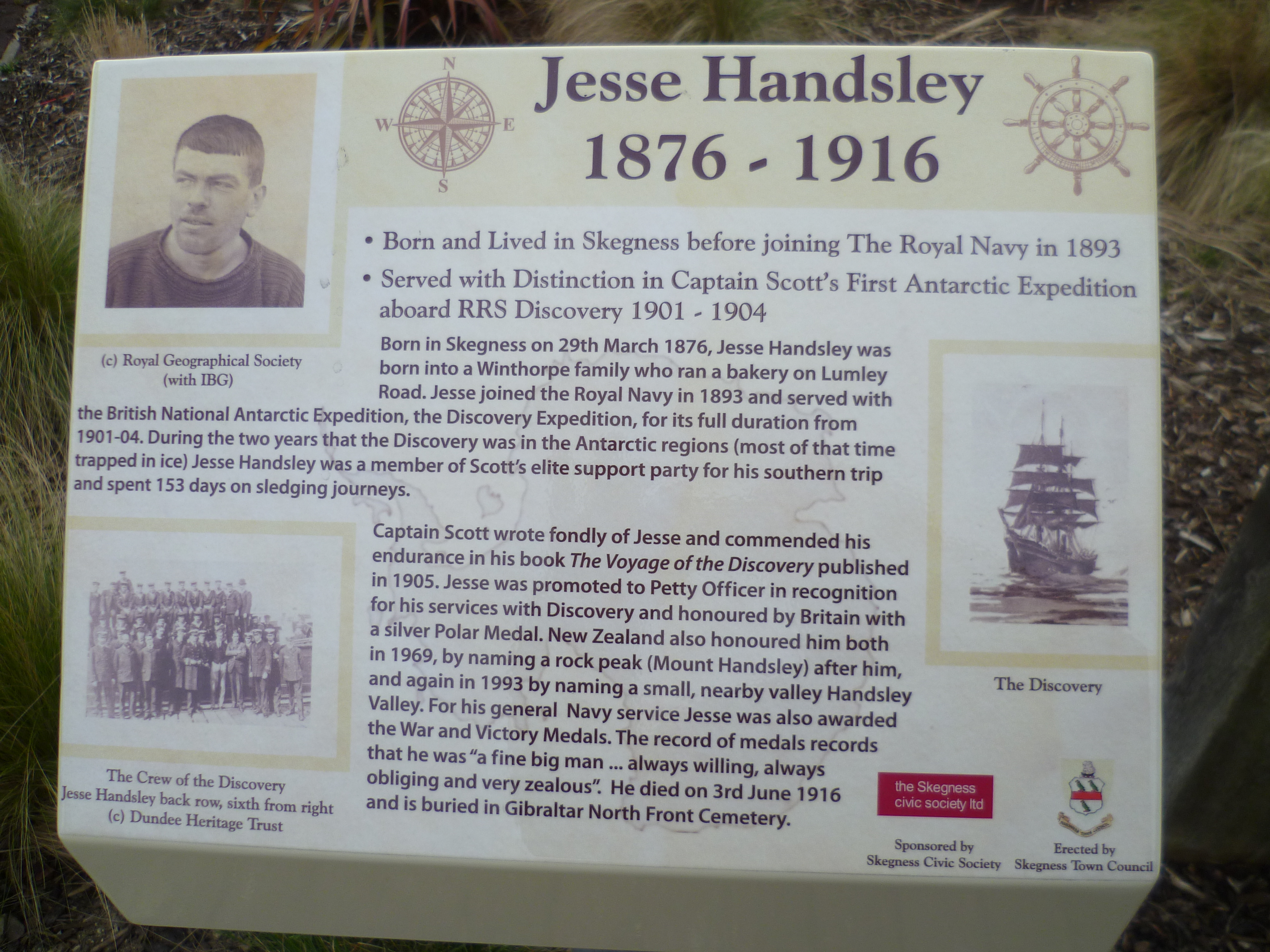
- Memorial Plaque
- Born: 29 March 1876; Skegness, Lincolnshire, England
- Died: 3 June 1916 (aged 40); Gibraltar, British Overseas Territory Whilst serving on HMS Swiftsure
- Burial place: North Front Cemetery, Gibraltar
- Spouse: Emily Robinson (1873-1919) (m. 1909)
- Children: Herbert Jesse Handsley (1910-1963)
- Relatives: John Handsley (1840-1922) (father); Rebecca Raithby (1857-1883) (mother); Charles John Handsley (1874-1960) (brother); Fred Handsley (1877-1965) (brother)
- Military career
- Allegiance: United Kingdom
- Branch: Royal Navy
- Years of service: 1893–1916
- Rank: Petty Officer
- Unit: HMS Swiftsure
- Expeditions: Discovery expedition
- Awards: Silver Polar Medal (1904); 1914-1915 Star; British War Medal; Victory Medal

Jesse Handsley (29 March 1876 – 3 June 1916) was an able seaman who served under Captain Robert Falcon Scott on the Discovery expedition of 1901 to 1904.

Handsley joined the Royal Navy on 24 December 1901 aged 15. Whilst serving on HMS Ringarooma at Port Chalmers, New Zealand, he joined the British National Antarctic Expedition.

During the expedition, he was chosen by Scott as a member of an elite support party for Scott's Southern trip. Handsley served for the full duration of the expedition, but the ship was trapped in ice for most of that time. He undertook several sledging trips whilst on the journey, spending a total of 153 days man-hauling sledges.

== Early life ==
=== Family ===
Born in Skegness, Lincolnshire to a long-established Lincolnshire family, he lived in Winthorpe and Wainfleet, Lincolnshire. In 1891 he became a baker boy, working and lodging in Lumley Road, Skegness.

He lived with his father John Handsley, a fisherman and his mother Rebecca Raithby. He was the middle son of three boys. His elder brother was Charles John Henry and younger brother was named Fred. Following the death of his mother in 1883, his father continued to raise the children until Jesse joined the Navy in 1894.

It is likely that the children were educated, as it was noted that most of the men on Discovery could read and write. Their father John had to make his mark on his marriage certificate, but both Charles and Jesse signed their marriage certificates.

Charles was named as next of kin when Jesse joined Discovery.

=== Early naval career ===
Handsley enlisted in the Royal Navy at the age of 15 and, in 1891, finished his basic training in January 1893. At 18, he enlisted for 12 years of duty in 1894. By 1895, he had completed his training to become an able seaman and was certified as a Seaman Gunner.

His service number was 164549.

Table 1: Demographic characters

Height	Age	Year
5'3 1/2	15	1891
5'7 1/2	18	1894
5'10 1/2	29	1905

Table 2: Training

Date	Ship	Type/(Year)	Rank
23 Oct 1891	HMS Impregnable	Training ship based at Devonport (1862)	Boy 2nd class
1 Nov 1891	Lion	Small sail training brig Tender to Impregnable	Boy 2nd class
10 Nov 1891	Lion	Small sail training brig Tender to Impregnable	Boy 1st class
20 Jan 1893	HMS Boscawen II (previously Minotaur renamed 1893)	Shore training establishment at Portland, using a number of ships	Boy 1st class

Table 3: Service at Sea

Date	Ship	Type	Rank	Note
21 Aug 1893	HMS Mersey	2nd class cruiser	Boy, 1st class	
29 Mar 1894	HMS Mersey	2nd class cruiser	Ordinary Seaman	Age 18 signed on for 12 years
20 Apr 1894	HMS Pembroke (1891)	Royal Naval Barracks, Chatham	Ordinary Seaman	
18 May 1894	HMS Ruby (1876)	Screw Cruiser 3rd class - training	Ordinary Seaman	
3 Oct 1894	HMS Pembroke (1891)	Royal Naval Barracks, Chatham	Ordinary Seaman	
24 Oct 1894	HMS Edinburgh	Battleship	Ordinary Seaman	
15 Dec 1894	HMS Galatea	Orlando-class armoured cruiser	Ordinary Seaman	
1 Apr 1895	HMS Galatea	Orlando-class armoured cruiser	Able Seaman	Fully trained
21 Sep 1895	(HMS Wildfire (shore establishment)	Established at Sheerness (1889)	Able Seaman	Qualified as Seaman Gunner
3 Mar 1896	HMS Pembroke (1891)	Royal Naval Barracks, Chatham	Able Seaman	
17 Mar 1896	HMS Collingwood	Admiral class battleship	Able Seaman	10 days cell punishment, reduced to the 2nd class for conduct, Seaman Gunner qualification suspended
5 Nov 1896	HMS Collingwood	Admiral class battleship	Able Seaman	
9 Mar 1897	HMS Royal Oak	Battleship	Able Seaman	14 days cell punishment, reduced to the 2nd class for conduct, Seaman Gunner qualification suspended
31 Mar 1899	HMS Pembroke (1891)	Royal Naval Barracks, Chatham	Able Seaman	
18 Oct 1899	(HMS Wildfire (shore establishment)	Established at Sheerness (1889)	Able Seaman	
23 Feb 1901	HMS Ringarooma (1889)	Pearl-class cruiser, renamed Ringarooma (1890)	Able Seaman	
24 Dec 1901	RRS Discovery (1901)	Purpose-built for Antarctic research	Able Seaman	

== Discovery Expedition, 1901–1904 ==
=== Expedition of the Heroic Age ===
The Discovery Expedition was undertaken during the Heroic Age of Antarctic Exploration. Setting sail in 1901, Discovery arrived in Antarctica in early 1902 establishing a base at McMurdo Sound. The purpose of the expedition was to undertake scientific and exploratory research and sledging journeys.

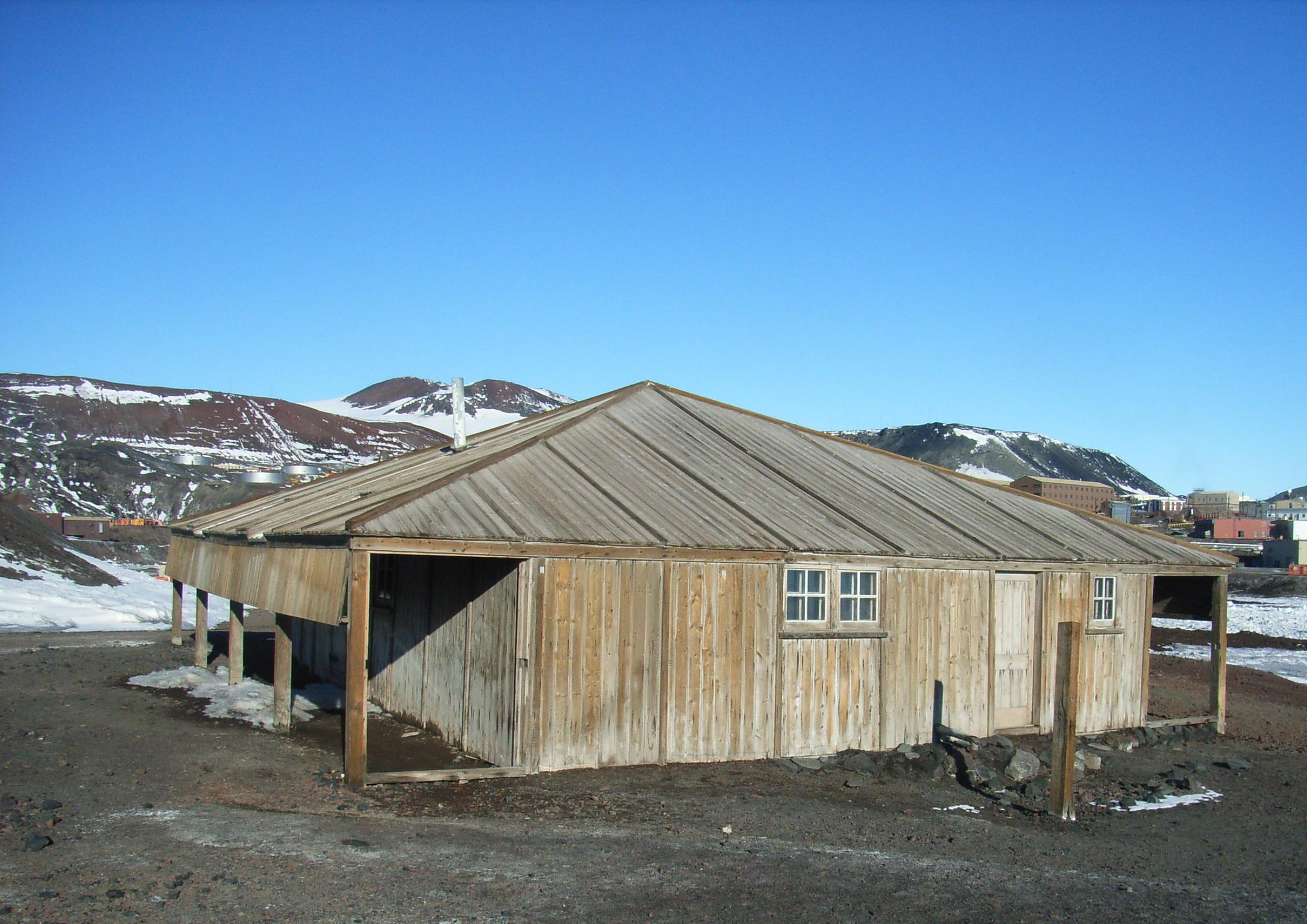
Discovery hut at Hut Point

A hut (known as the Discovery Hut) was erected, intended as accommodation for the men but it proved to be too cold so the ship became their living quarters and base camp.

Around a dozen names have been found at the Discovery Hut, among these are Weller, Cross and Handsley, all from Scott's original Discovery expedition.

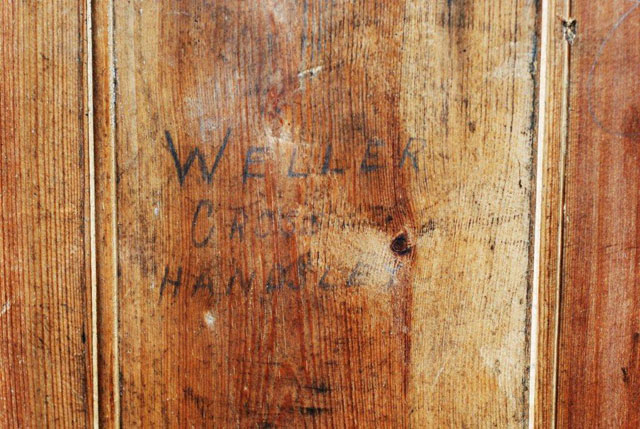
Three names from Scott's Discovery Expedition 1901 in Discovery Hut

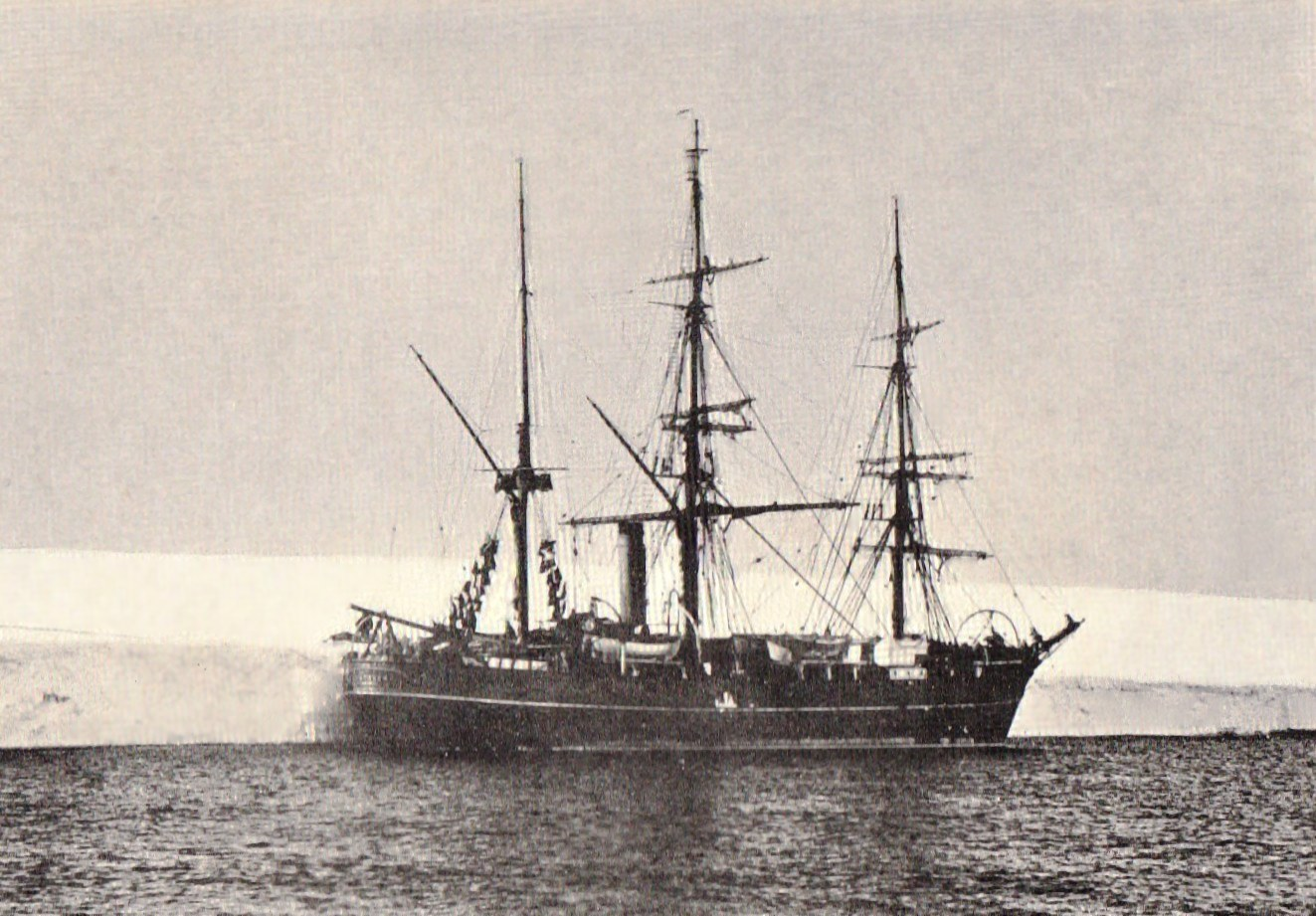
The expedition ship Discovery in the Antarctic, alongside the Great Ice Barrier

On the voyage to Antarctica, sea water seeped into the ship's hold and a well-received joke during a show put on in the Discovery Hut which was "What vegetable did the Discovery bring from England'?", "The Dundee Leak". The condition of food stored in the hold was checked daily. During the winter of 1902, the ship became frozen into the ice. The relief ship SY Morning arrived with supplies and several of Discovery's crew returned to England aboard the Morning, although the majority remained and the expedition was extended for another season.

In late 1903 the Morning returned with the Terra Nova with explicit orders to bring back all the expedition members if the Discovery could not be freed. The Discovery crew sighted the two relief ships on 5 January 1904.

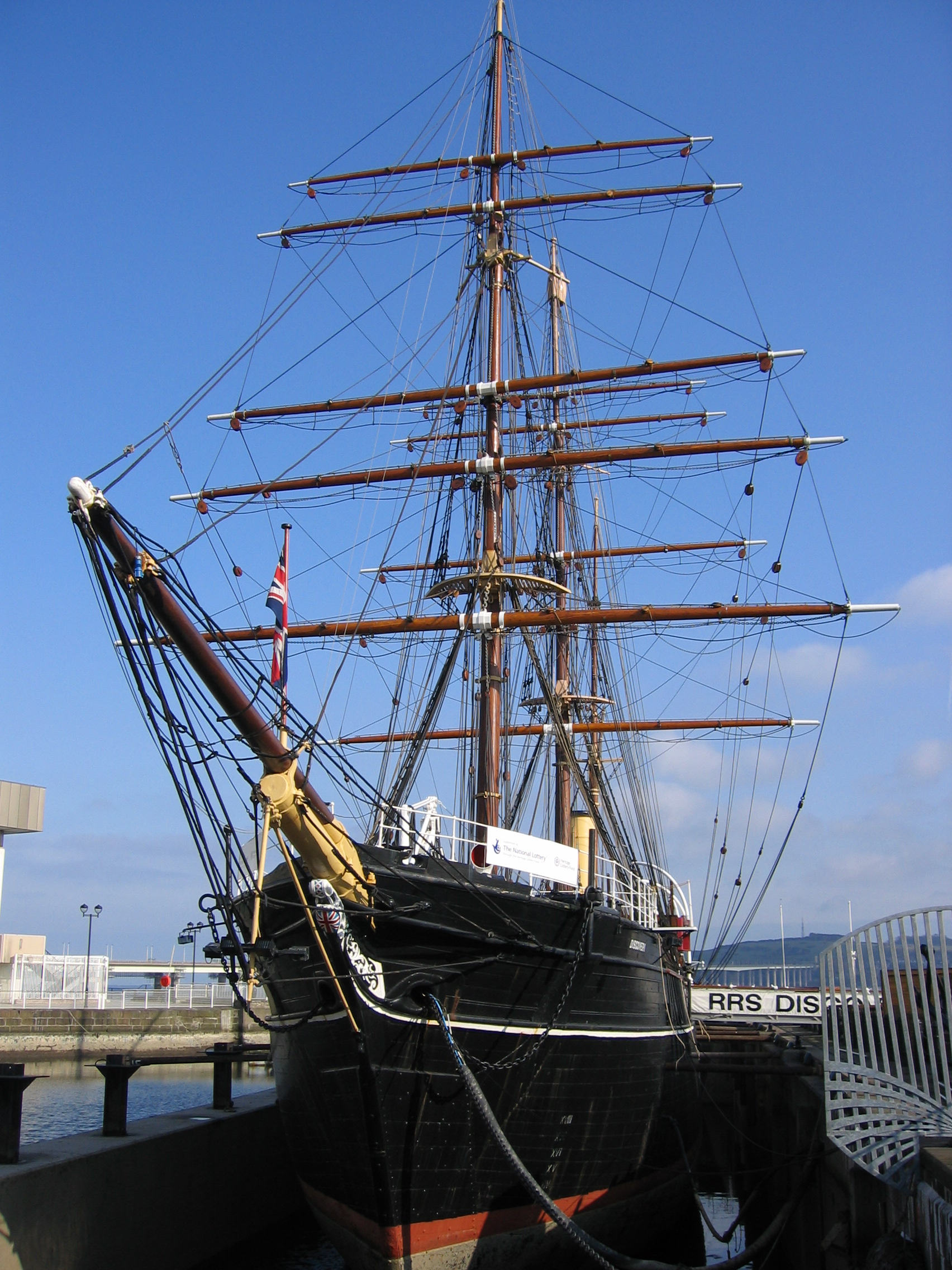
Discovery, Dundee 2007

Scott and his crew did not relish the prospect of abandoning Discovery, their home for the last three years, and set about releasing her with renewed efforts. Discovery finally broke free, and the three ships left Antarctica together.

The voyage from Antarctica was fraught with danger, but the expedition finally reached London, and the crew were welcomed as heroes. They were viewed as pilgrims of the historic age.

The Discovery, built in Dundee, had many uses in later years including use by the Boy Scouts/Sea Cadets. The ship was saved from the breaker's yard in 1979, restored, is now the centrepiece of Dundee's visitor attraction at Discovery Point, Dundee.

=== The crew ===
Of the 48 crew members, all but two returned home.

Handsley joined the expedition by fate, volunteering following a tragic accident when Charles Bonner fell from above the crows nest to his death whilst Discovery was leaving Littleton, New Zealand, he was relieved from his naval duties on HMS Ringarooma.

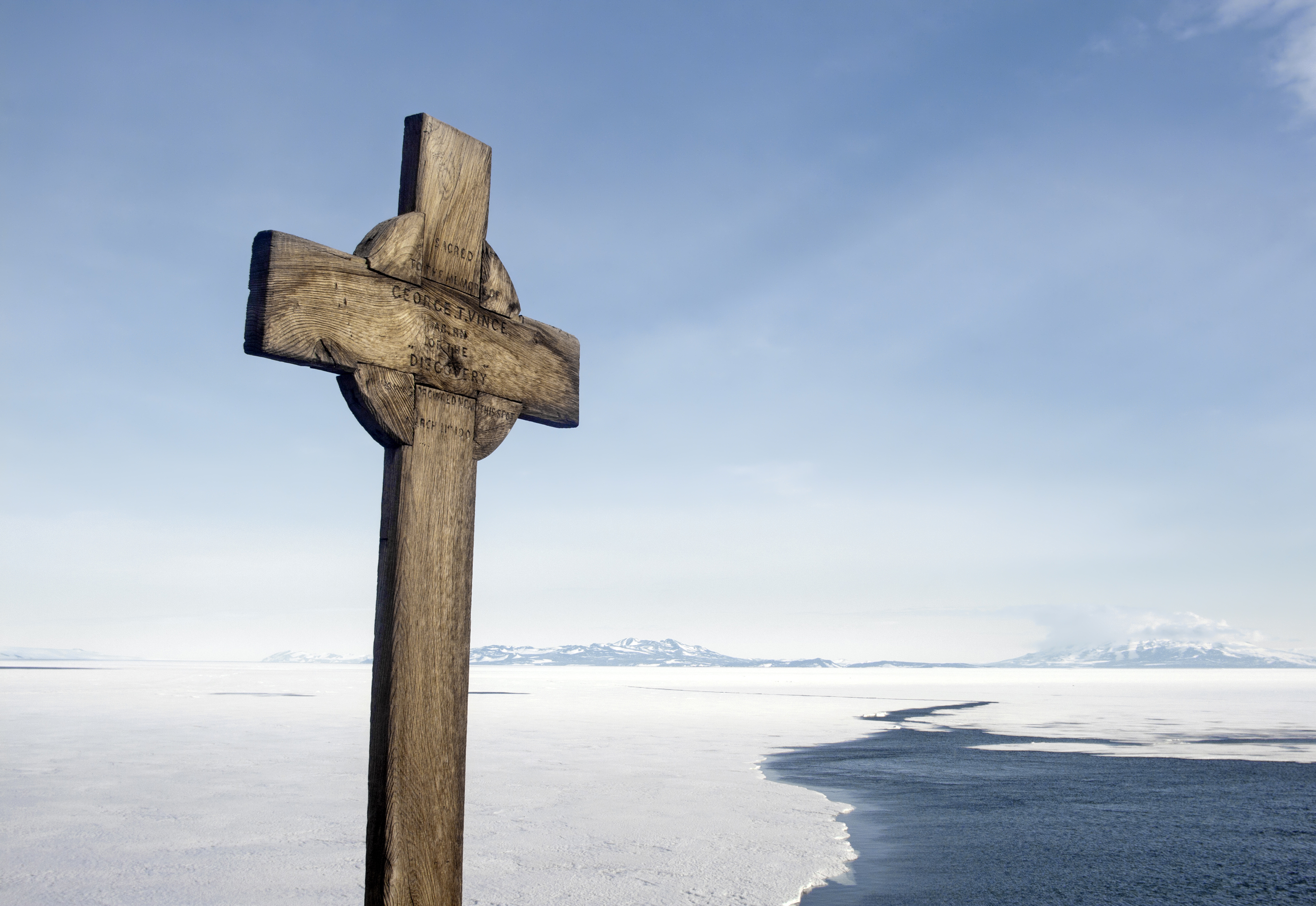
The Vince memorial cross, erected on the Hut Point promontory

The other tragedy of the expedition occurred in Antarctica when George Vince slid to his death over a precipice into the water whilst wearing fur boots which were the wrong type of footwear for the conditions. A cross still stands to his memory on the summit of Hut Point.

Tom Crean (explorer), also a volunteer from the Ringarooma, was a member of three major Antarctic expeditions including Scott's fatal expedition to reach the South Pole (1911–1913).

Handsley joined two other Lincolnshire men on the expedition:

Reginald Skelton born at Long Sutton, Lincolnshire, supervised the building of Discovery and was Chief Engineer and official photographer on the expedition.

Arthur Harry Blissett born in Grantham, Lincolnshire, (Royal Marine) was a ward room steward and domestic on the expedition. Arthur completed 30 days of sledging and undertook research into Emperor penguins. Arthur got married at Littleton and returned with his new bride to England until emigrating to New Zealand in 1922.

In 1904, the Polar Medal was inaugurated for members of the expedition. Bronze Polar Medals were awarded to members of the crew who returned home on the Morning, Silver Polar Medals were awarded to those who served for the full term of the expedition, with Gold Medals being presented to those with outstanding achievements on the expedition. It was also awarded to the crews of both rescue ships, Terra Nova and Morning.

=== Handsley’s contribution ===
Handsley undertook several sledging journeys spending a total of 153 days man-hauling sledges.

From the record of medals (Royal Geographical Society):

"Always willing, always obliging and very zealous"

	Date	Days	Detail
(1)	3 Feb 1902	25	Over the barrier with Armitage
(2)	29 Oct 1902 – 22 Nov 1902	25	With Lieutenant Barne
(3)	29 Nov 1902 – 19 Jan 1903	21	Armitage's Inland Journey
(4)	12 Oct 1903 – 21 Oct 1903	20	Western Journey with Scott
(5)	26 Oct 1903 – 16 Dec 1903	22	The Great Inland Journey with Skelton

(1) 3 February 1902. Handsley journeyed over the barrier with a partyledd by Lieutenant Armitage, under instruction to return within 24 hours. In the haste to leave, a tent was left behind and 5 of the party of 6 occupied a 3-man tent whilst the 6th, Bernacchi, slept outside. The surveying party left the next morning, and Handsley, who was not yet adept on skis returned to camp after 11 miles. By the time the party arrived back at Discovery, they had learnt a great deal more about the barrier.

(2) With Lieutenant Barne

(3) 29 November 1902 to 19 January 1903 - Armitage reached the summit of Victoria Land on his 2nd attempt. A surveying party of 21 men, made up of two parties. The Main Western Party (12 men including Handsley) with 10 sledges and over 1,300 lbs of food, less than 2 ½ lbs per man per day and the Western Support Party (9 men). On 15 December they started a descent, lowering sledges down a 40° slope, some of the party losing control, Handsley and Walker brought down their 9 ft sledge without incident following in the tracks of the others. Christmas lunch was Welsh rarebit and bacon on biscuits. They reached the summit on 28 December and returned to Discovery on 19 January 1903.

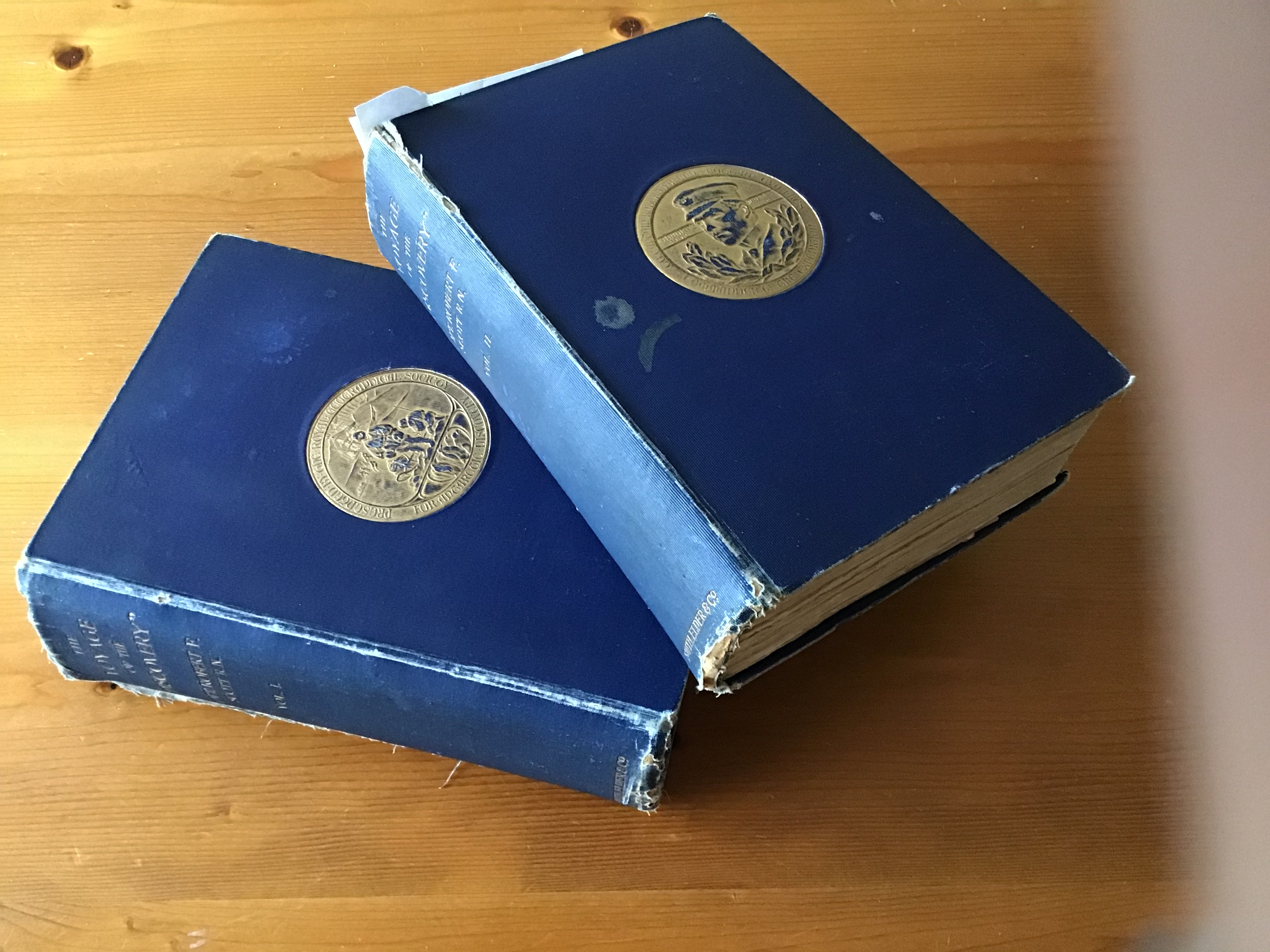
The Voyage of the Discovery

(Not shown in table) 9 September 1903. Scott, Skelton, Daily, Evans, Lashly and Handsley form a party to find a new road to the Ferrar Glacier and place a depot ready for a great western journey over the ice cap.

The party encountered a blizzard and delayed reaching the New Harbour until 13 September. They spent an anxious night on the 14th when temperatures dropped to -49°. By 16 September they reached Cathedral Rocks, deposited provisions and set out for home, the temperature had fallen below -50° each night, they reached Discovery on 20 September 1903.

(4) 12 October 1903 – 12 men – Journey to Summit of Victoria Land and as far as could be reached in the time limit. The advance party were to proceed and the remainder to turn back. The parties would pick up food from the depot at Cathedral Rocks. They reached the Knob Head Moraine in 6 days, making better progress than the 27 days it had taken Armitage's party in September 1903.

(5) 22 November 1903 the party split and Handsley, who was used to working at sea level, had been undertaking work at (∓) 8,500 feet, was suffering at the high altitude with his chest. Scott praised him for his determination to carry on saying "they won't give in till they break down, and then they consider their collapse disgraceful", but it was decided that he and two others would return to Discovery whilst Scott, Evans and Lashly would continue on, returning to Discovery on Christmas Eve. where they found Jess still recovering

Escape from the ice. 31 December 1903 - Handsley was now recovered and joined the sawing camp which was set up to saw through the great ice-sheet which intervened between the Discovery and the sea. Due to conditions the sawing had to begin in the middle of the ice sheet, not at the edge. Work had been ongoing for 10 days, the 30 men were working in temperatures of up to -36° and sleeping in tents. To make a channel a mile in length they had to cut through four miles of ice. Twenty miles of ice still encased Discovery.

Scott decided that they should prepare for another winter and Handsley with three others set about raids on the penguins to ensure a winter food stock. On 28 January 1903, Discovery started creaking and moving in the ice and on 5 February, Scott decided to use explosives to free her. By 15 February, the Morning and the Terra Nova break through and lie almost side by side with Discovery, and on 16 February Discovery was freed.

== Return to naval duties ==
=== Postings ===
Following the Discovery Expedition, Handsley was given advancement to Petty Officer 1st class without going through the intermediate rate of Leading Seaman.

Date	Ship	Type	Note
1 Oct 1904	Pembroke I	Royal Naval Barracks, Chatham	
7 Jun 1905	HMS Wildfire (Shore establishment)	Established at Sheerness (1889)	General duties
3 Aug 1905	Pembroke	Royal Naval Barracks, Chatham	General duties. Presented with Silver Polar Medal (1904) (No.20)
4 Sep 1905	HMS Merlin	Sloop	Deprived of 2 good conduct badges in 1907 & 1908
22 Apr 1909	Pembroke I	Royal Naval Barracks, Chatham	8 months, the first month or so of shore leave would have been for foreign service leave
10 Dec 1909	HMS Ganges	Training establishment, Shotley	Petty Officers of a high standard were drafted to training establishments
1 May 1010	Ganges II	Old ships at training establishment	
6 Apr 1911	Pembroke I	Royal Naval Barracks, Chatham	Awaiting draft to next ship
26 May 1911	HMS Shannon	Armoured cruiser, flagship of the 2nd Cruiser Squadron,	
21 Jan 1913	Pembroke I	Royal Naval Barracks, Chatham	
8 Feb 1913	HMS Shannon		
10 Mar 1914	Pembroke I	Royal Naval Barracks, Chatham	
15 Apr 1914	HMS Triton (1882)	Small surveying vessel	Carrying out surveys in Home Waters
4 Aug 1914	Pembroke	Royal Naval Barracks, Chatham	
28 Nov 1914	HMS Wallaroo	Inactive guardship at Chatham	
19 Mar 1916	Pembroke I	Royal Naval Barracks, Chatham	Awaiting draft to next ship
3 May 1916	HMS Swiftsure	Pre-dreadnought battleship	
3 Jun 1916	Royal Naval Hospital Gibraltar		Discharged Dead. Cause of death: gastric ulcer

=== Promotions and conduct ===
Handsley's conduct was assessed each year, mostly as good, but he served at least two sessions of cell punishment during his 23 years service He was awarded two good conduct badges but was deprived of them both before having them both restored. It took him 17 years to get his third badge, 5 years longer than the usual 12 years. His service record does show that his conduct was assessed as very good towards the end of his tragically short life.

== Personal life ==
Handsley married Emily Robinson in 1909 and they had one son, Herbert Jesse Handsley. Emily died in 1919. Herbert never remarried and spent his later life in Chalfont Epilepsy Colony until his death in 1963.

His brother Charles married Lydia Annie Davis (1898) and had a daughter, Millicent Emily Handsley (1899). The family line continues today.

== Posthumous recognition ==
Quartermain Mountains
- Location within Antarctica

Geography
- Continent: Antarctica
- Range coordinates: 77°51′S 160°45′E

In addition to the Silver Polar Medal (1904) awarded for his time serving on Discovery, Handsley was awarded the 1914-1915 Star, the British War Medal and the Victory Medal. His Polar Medal was sold at Sotherby's to a private collector on 2 July 1980. His war medals were sold by auctioneers Dix Noonan Web on 4 December 2008.

Mount Handsley, named in 1969 by the New Zealand Antarctic Place-Names Committee in recognition of his efforts on a major sledging journey with Scott, Evans, Feather Skelton and Lashly Evans up the Ferrar and Taylor Glaciers in 1903.

Handsley Valley, is a small ice-free valley between Knobhead and Mount Handsley in the Quartermain Mountains of Victoria Land, Antarctica. It was named by the New Zealand Geographic Board in 1993 in association with Mount Handsley.

Jesse Handsley Memorial, Compass Gardens, Skegness, Lincolnshire, 21 March 2016.

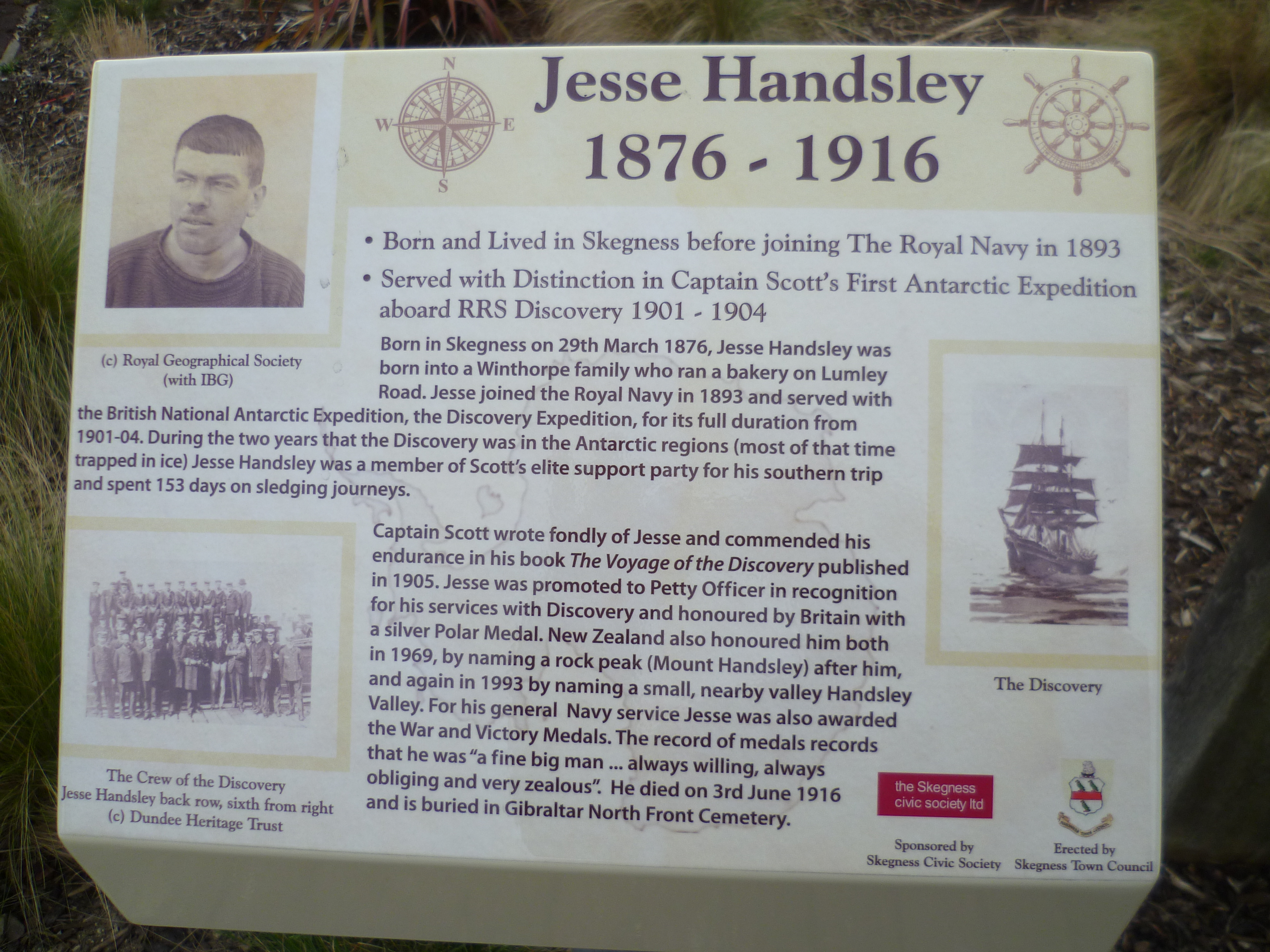
Jesse Handsley Memorial Plaque

In the centenary year of his death Handsley was honoured by Skegness, the town of his birth, when Mayor Councillor Carl Macey unveiled a tribute board, sponsored by Skegness Town Council and Skegness Civic Society, to the "son of Skegness".

Also attending were representatives of Grantham Civic Society who had recently honoured their 'son of Grantham' by placing a blue plaque on the birthplace of Royal Marine Arthur Harry Blissett, ward room steward on Discovery.

The unveiling was followed by a dedication and blessing on 8 May 2016 by the Reverend Ian Banks.

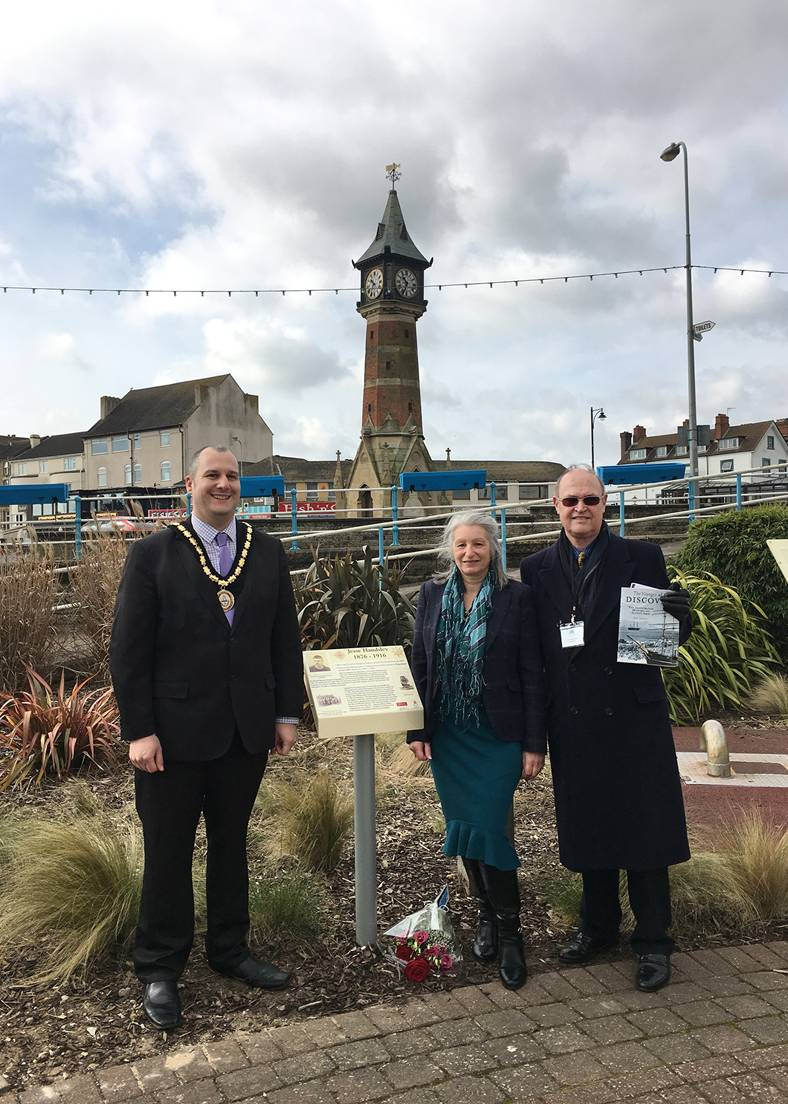
Jesse Handsley Memorial unveiling March 2016 Mayor of Skegness, Councillor Carl Macey, Jane Handsley & Courtney Finn of Grantham Civic Society

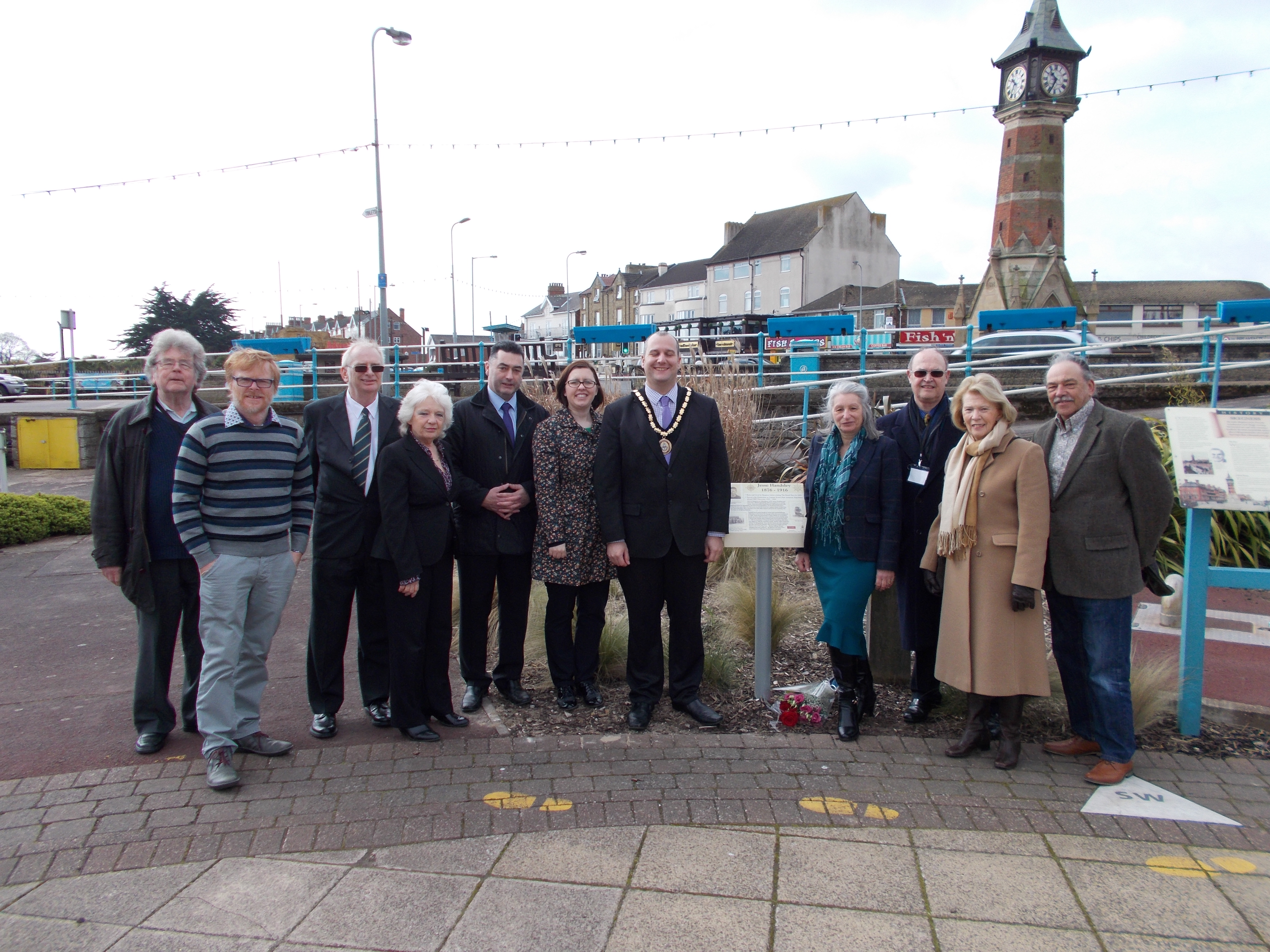
Jesse Handsley Memorial Unveiling. Representatives of Skegness Town Council, Skegness Civic Society and Grantham Civic Society

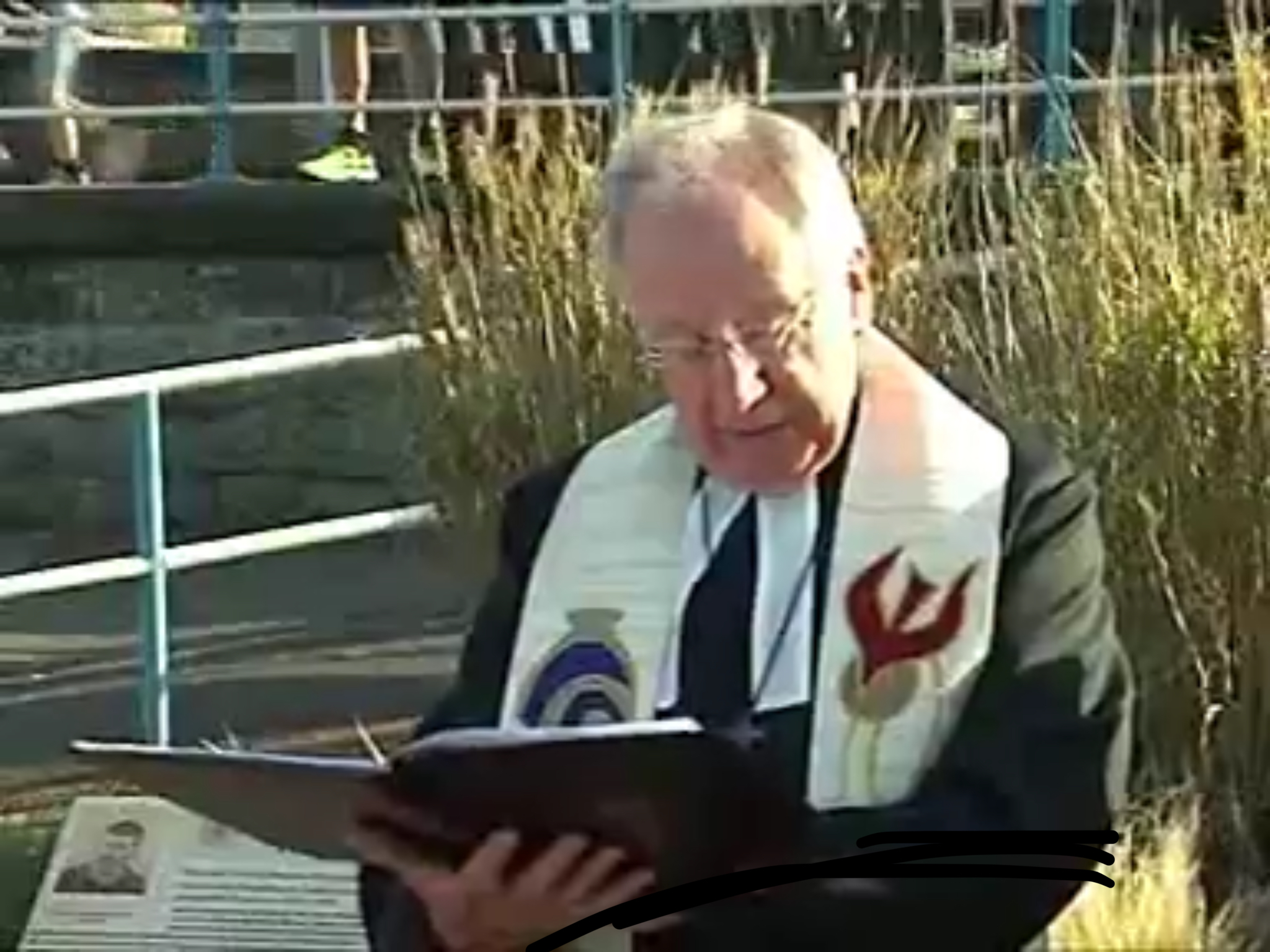
Jesse Handsley Memorial Blessing, May 2016, the Reverend Ian Banks

Final resting place, North Front Cemetery, Gibraltar

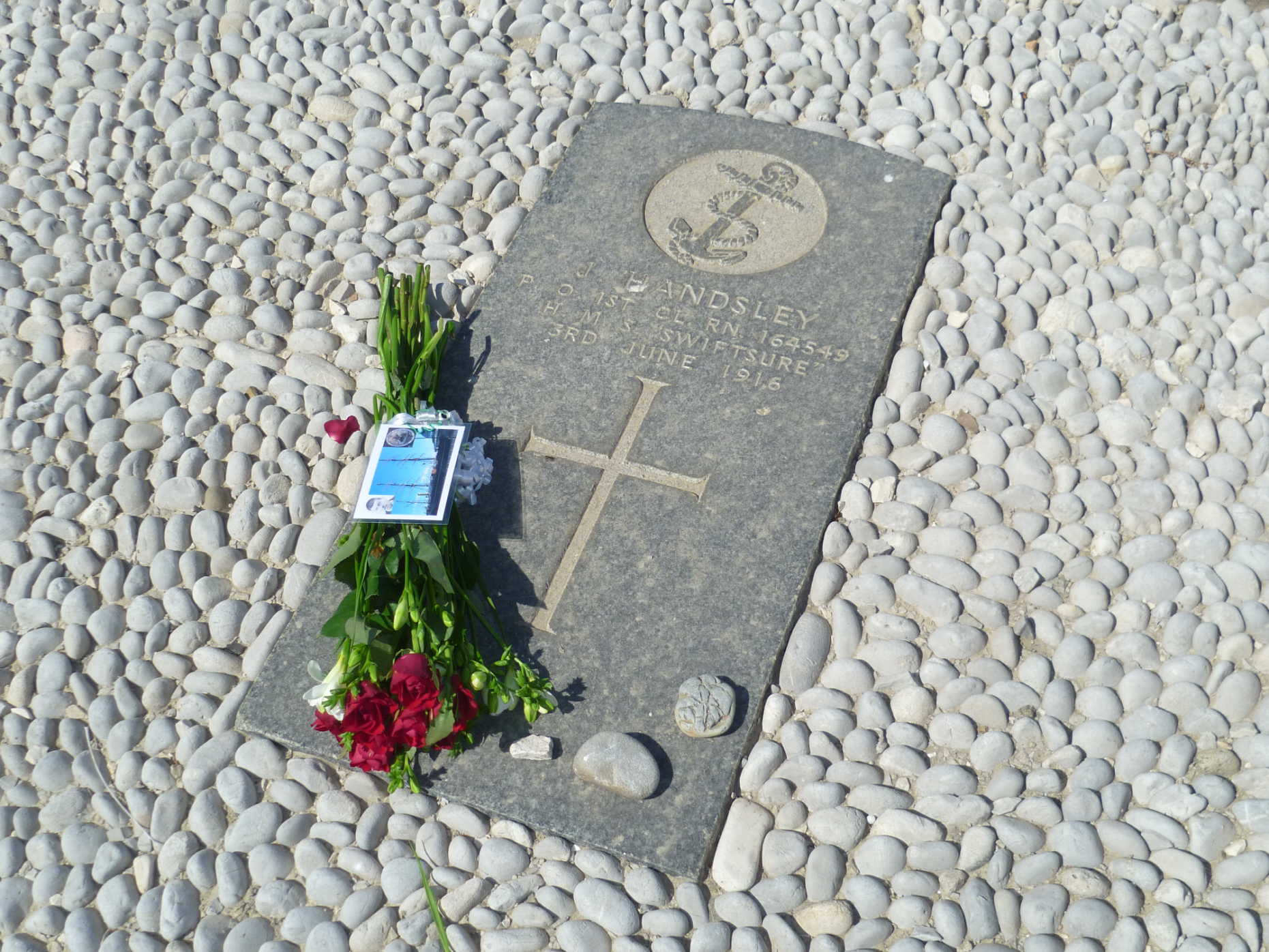
Jesse Handsley

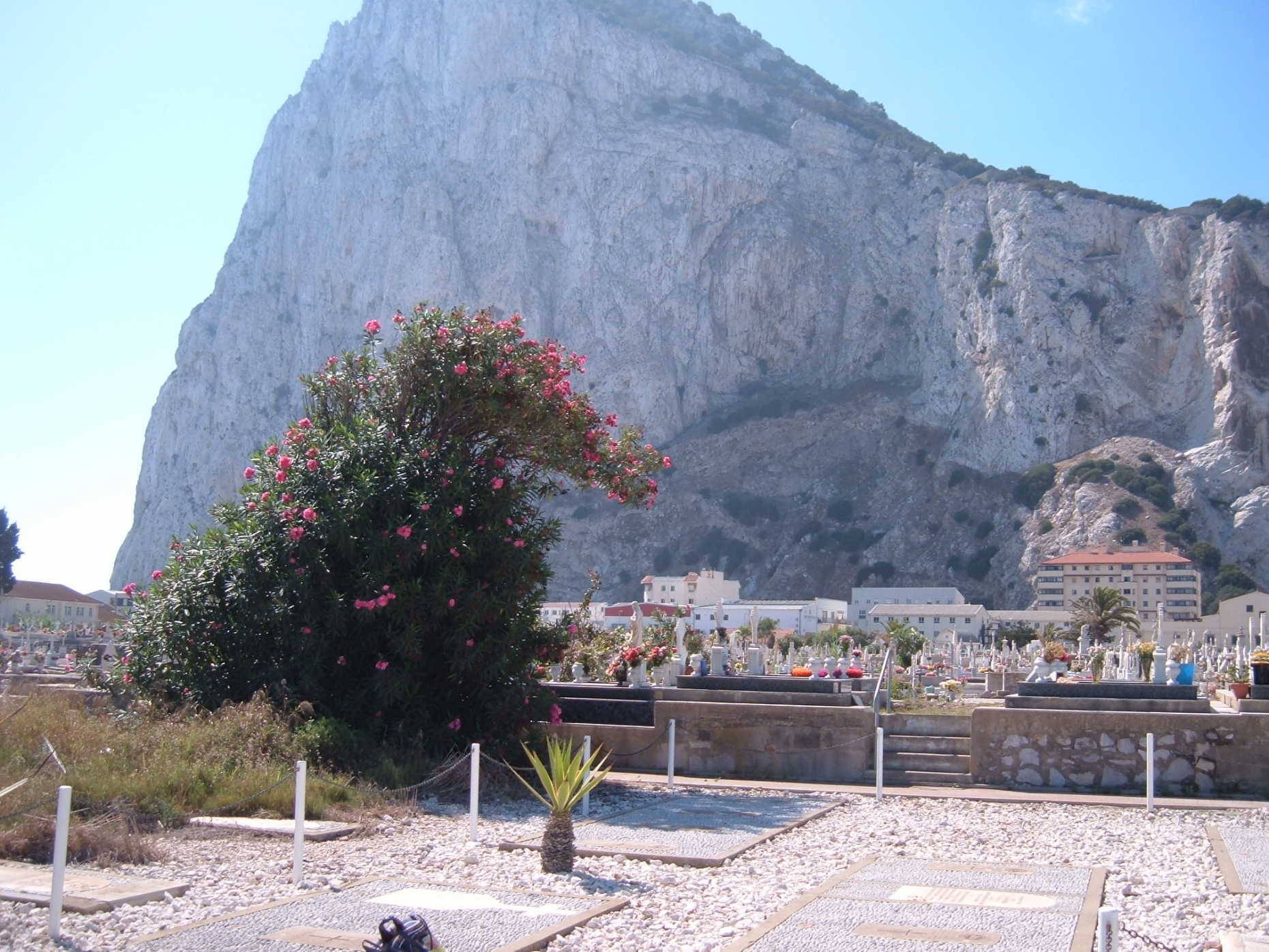
Rock of Gibraltar viewed from graveside

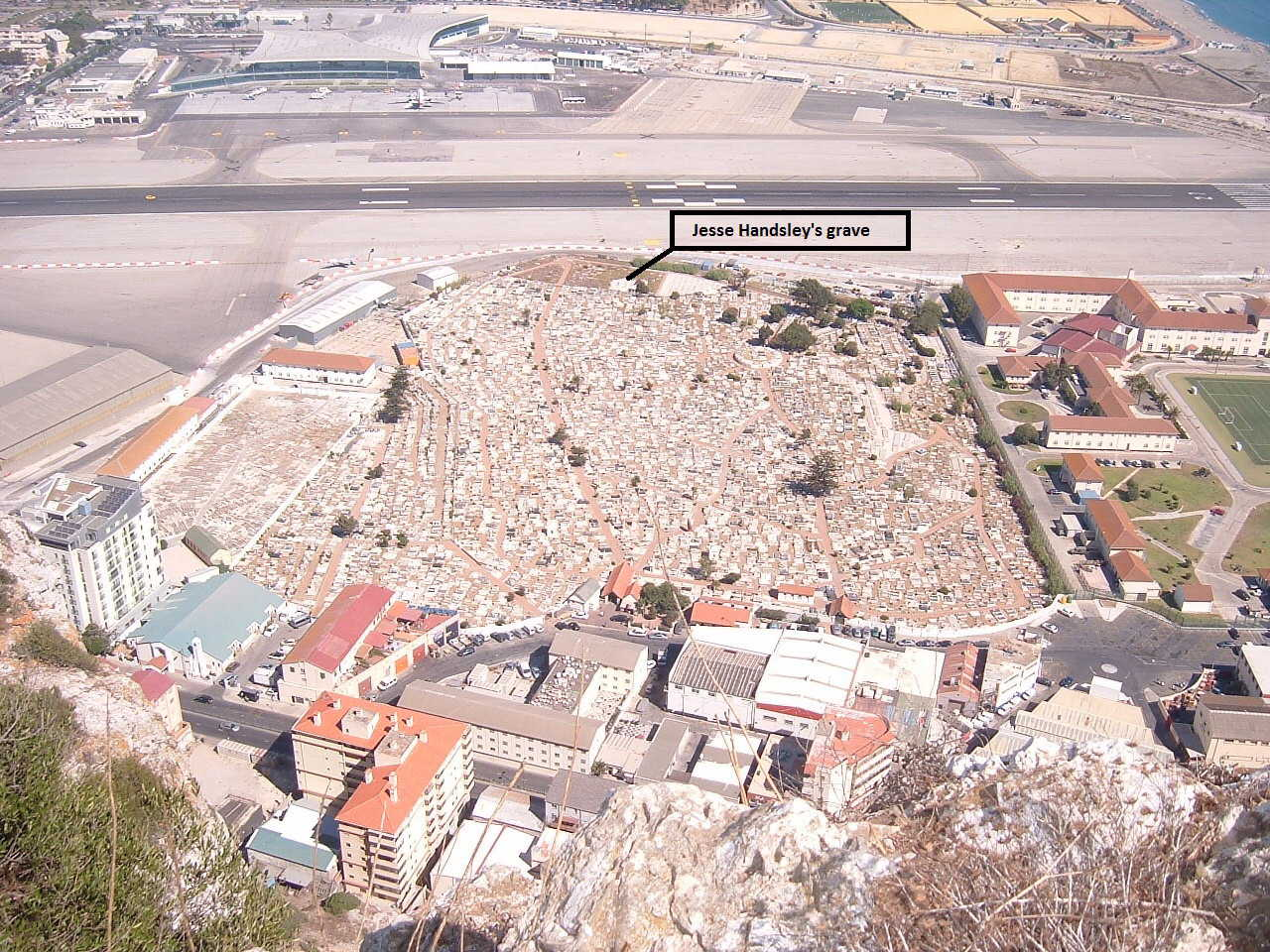
Aerial view of cemetery indicating grave
