= Crean Glacier =

Glacier in Antarctica

- Location within South Georgia Island
- Location: South Georgia
- Coordinates: 54°8′S 37°1′W
- Length: 4 nmi (7 km; 5 mi)
- Thickness: unknown
- Terminus: Antarctic Bay
- Status: unknown

Crean Glacier (54°8′S 37°1′W) is a glacier 4 miles (6.4 km) long, flowing northwest from Wilckens Peaks to the head of Antarctic Bay on the north coast of South Georgia. It was surveyed by the South Georgia Survey in the period 1951–57 and named by the UK Antarctic Place-Names Committee for Irishman Tom Crean, Second Officer of the Endurance during the British expedition under Ernest Shackleton, 1914–16. Crean accompanied Shackleton and Frank Worsley in the James Caird from Elephant Island to King Haakon Bay, South Georgia, and made the overland crossing with them to Stromness; this glacier lies on the route.

== See also ==
- List of glaciers in the Antarctic
- Glaciology
