= Arthur Harry Blissett =

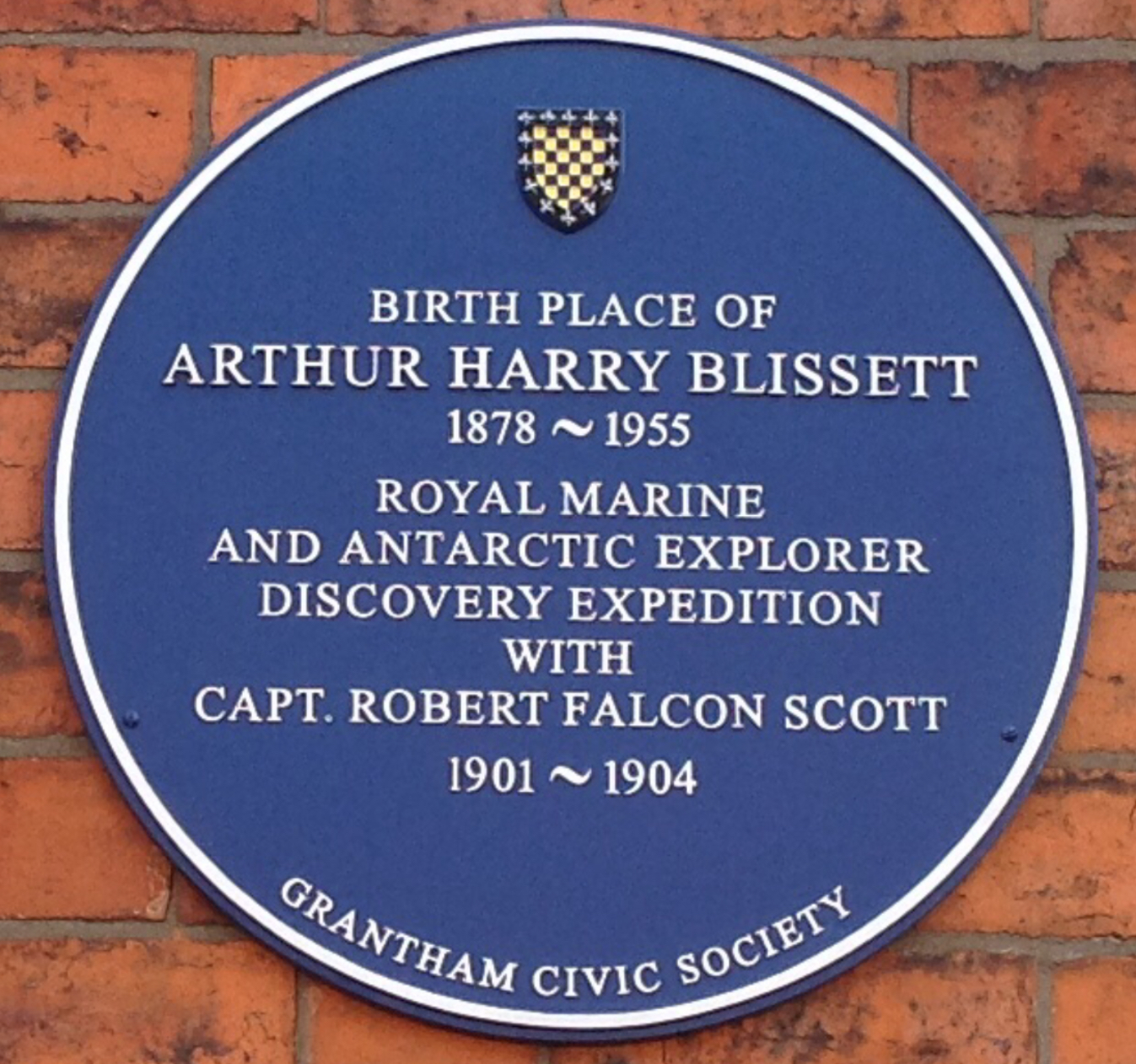
- Arthur Blissett Blue Plaque
- Born: 21 January 1878; Grantham, Lincolnshire, England
- Died: c. 14 August 1955 (aged 77)
- Spouse: Florence R Deighton (1881–1966) (m. 1904)
- Military career
- Allegiance: United Kingdom
- Branch: Royal Marines
- Years of service: 1896–1904; 1915–1919
- Expeditions: Discovery Expedition
- Awards: Silver Polar Medal (1904)

Arthur Harry Blissett (21 January 1878 – c. 14 August 1955), was a Lance Corporal, Royal Marine who joined Captain Robert Falcon Scott on the Discovery expedition of 1901–1904.

Blissett undertook 30 days of perilous sledging journeys with temperatures plummeting to -62°.

== Early life ==
=== Family ===
Blissett was born on 21 January 1878. He came from a humble background, in 1851 his grandmother, Ann, was a pauper with seven children, including his father Rueben. His parents Rueben Blissett and Ann Faulkner married in 1876, he was the third of six children, three girls and three boys. Blissett was baptised as Church of England at St John's Evangelist Church, Spittlegate, Grantham, Lincolnshire.

By 1861 his father was a carter (servant) in the parish of Mere and by 1871 he was a police constable at Market Rasen, moving to Barrowby in Lincolnshire and by 1881 Rueben and Ann were married and had four of their six children, including Blissett.

By 1891 Rueben was a police constable at Glanford, Brigg and Arthur was a farm worker. In later life Arthur worked as a prison warden.

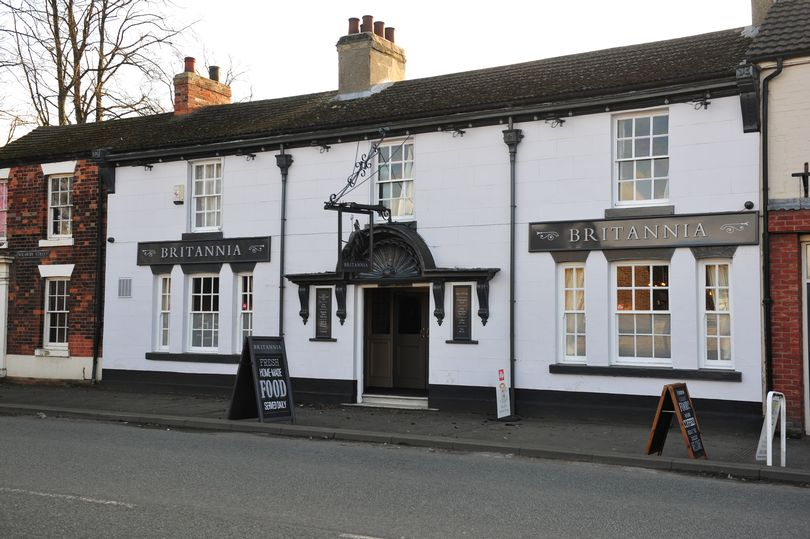
The Britannia Inn, Brigg

By 1901, his parents ran The Britannia Inn in Brigg. Blissett married in Lyttelton, New Zealand, upon his return from the Antarctic in 1904.

In 1901 Blissett was listed at the Royal Marine Barracks, Alvestoke, Hampshire.

Blissett's parents remained at the Britannia Inn until his father's death in 1913, he left personal effects of £343.

=== Royal Marine Light Infantry (RMLI) service ===
Blissett completed two periods of service. He originally enlisted in 1896 serving eight years, joining the Discovery expedition from its commencement at the Isle of Wight, England in 1904. Serving the full term of the expedition, he completed his service in the Royal Marines in 1904.

Blissett re-enlisted in 1915, during World War I, in the Portsmouth Division at York, age 37.

He had two Good Conduct Badges when he re-entered, for service from his original enlistment. His character and conduct were V(ery) G(ood) and Sat(isfactory) throughout his second service, and Blissett was in the First Class for Conduct throughout. He was tested for his ability to swim in October 1896. Florence Rose Blissett (wife), Christchurch New Zealand is listed as next of kin.

His service throughout WWI was on board HMS Monarch, a 'super-dreadnought' in the Grand Fleet, based at Scapa Flow, the ship was present at the battle of Jutland, on 31 May 1916. By tradition Royal Marines manned the two aftermost turrets. The Royal Marine Barracks (their messdecks on board were called 'the barracks', even though they were afloat) were always situated between the sailors' messdecks and the officers' accommodation further aft, so it made sense that they manned the aftermost turrets.

Blissett's promotion to corporal, three days after re-entry in 1915 indicates that he had been a Corporal when he had previously been discharged. Leaving the Monarch at the end of the war, on 4 February 1919, Blissett returned to Forton, before being demobbed on 12 March under a free discharge, returning to Brigg.

RMLI had barracks in the three home ports, Portsmouth, Chatham and Devonport. Blissett's Portsmouth Division, was based at Forton Barracks, in Gosport.

In 1923, when the RMLI and RMA(rtillary) re-amalgamated, they gave up Forton Barracks, and amalgamated their Portsmouth homes in Eastney Barracks. Forton Barracks became HMS St. Vincent – one of the Navy's shore training establishments for Boy Seamen. It closed as a naval establishment in 1968, and is now the St. Vincent 6th Form College, run by Hampshire County Council Education Authority.

== Discovery Expedition (1901–1904) ==
=== Blissett’s contribution ===
From Record of medals:

Four teeth stopped, two extracted.

Got married at Lyttelton.

	Date	Detail
(1)	31/03/1902	Autumn Journey
(2)	03/11/1902 – 20/11/1902	With Royds to Cape Crozier, brought back a load of eggs
(3)	07/09/1903 – 17/09/1903	First Spring Party, -50° to -62°

=== The expedition ===
The Discovery Expedition (1901–1904) was an expedition of discovery and scientific research. Discovery, under the command of Robert Falcon Scott, left the Isle of Wight on 6 August 1901, stopping to refuel and restock at Lyttelton, New Zealand. Leaving New Zealand on 24 December 1901, Discovery arrived at Cape Adare on 9 January 1902. On 8 February 1902 the research ship moored at McMurdo Sound establishing winter quarters. A hut was erected at Hut Point but Scott decided the expedition should live and work aboard ship leaving the hut to be used as a storeroom and shelter. Discovery became frozen in the sea ice.

In his book The Voyage of the Discovery, published in 1905, Scott tells of the perils they had to contend with. Computing the weight of what they had to man haul on sledges, the food they must consume to be able to do this, a diet to prevent scurvy and other ailments, temperatures falling to well below -70°, sleeping in frozen tents, falls down crevices etc., skiing and walking in treacherous conditions, in thick cloud, blizzards and avalanches. He also tells of the bravery and great camaraderie both on their travels and over the long winter months of waiting and preparation.

Trial sledge journeys were undertaken during January to March 1902, enabling the men to practise travelling techniques and get used to the conditions.

On 11 March 1902, a party returning from an attempted journey to Cape Crozier, Able Seaman George Vince was killed when he slid over the edge of a cliff, never to be seen again. A cross erected in his memory, still stands at the summit of Hut Point.

(1) Blissett set out in March 1902 on his first recorded Autumn Journey man hauling sledge trains of up to a ton.

=== Winter months (May 1902 to August 1902) ===
Preparations were underway for the next season's work, observations were undertaken and leisure activities perused including amateur theatricals (performed in Discovery Hut), educational lectures, football and publication of the South Polar Times.

Although the ship was preferable to the hut for living quarters, the ship's insulation was inadequate, the sides were not lined and ice formed in the bunks, the men had to chip out their mattresses

23 June 1902, the celebration of mid-winter day.

Like most of the men, Blissett suffered from scurvy and frostbite, but returned safely home. The cause of the scurvy was not fully understood, but is likely to be the tinned provisions, Scott increased the amount of fresh food into the crew's diet and the scurvy was contained .

=== First sledging season ===
Winter ended and trial sledging journeys were undertaken to test equipment ready for Scott's planned journey south.

11 September 1902, among the parties leaving the ship was a 6-man party (including Blissett) led by Armitage They covered 9 miles on the first day using skis and a sail on the sledge. 6 days later, 29 miles from the ship, progress was delayed due to ill health and Cross and Blissett were left at the base of the Ferrar Glacier whilst the remainder pushed on up the valley hoping to find a new road into the interior of Victoria Land. On the 11th day out Armitage decided to turn back.

2 November 1902 – 3 February 1903 Scott embarked on a journey, aiming for the 80° line, the farthest south any man had been at that time During this time parties had been deployed, adding knowledge to their surroundings.

(2) 3 to 17 November 1902 Blissett journeyed with Plumley to Cape Crozier led by Royds (who hated the idea), taking provisions and food for 15 days. They also visited an Adélie penguin rookery and brought back eggs. The shells were blown for scientific purposes and the contents scrambled. Blissett was the first person on the expedition to discover an intact Emperor Penguin's egg, and the second ever to be recorded. Scott writes "Blissett has discovered an Emperor penguins egg, and his mess mates expect him to be knighted". "The joy was great and soon after the party hastened back with their treasure".

Scott writes extensively on the knowledge of penguins gained on this trip.

Royds recorded the change in ice coverage of the sea, which two weeks previously he had noted had not been present, but now the entire sea was thickly packed. There was no evidence that the ice was retreating. The young penguin chicks they hoped to observe had left the rookery in October 1902 and as it was impossible for them to have shed their down or to have taken to the water Royds concluded that they must have drifted to the north on the ice floe

This was the end of their observations until the following spring.

The expedition's organisers expected that the Discovery would be freed from the ice early in 1903, but when the relief ship, the Morning, arrived Discovery was still firmly fixed in the ice. On board the Morning was a letter authorising a second year. Most of the crew remained, those leaving with the relief ship were awarded a Bronze Polar Medal, those who remained would be awarded a Silver Polar Medal with the exception of those recognised for outstanding achievements who would be awarded a Gold Polar Medal.

=== Second sledging season ===
The following spring, two weeks after the sun's return, days were short and nights were long and cold and discomfort was intense, Royd's party undertook further journeys to Cape Crozier to improve their knowledge of penguins.

(3) 7 September 1903 Royd returned to Cape Crozier embarking on the first spring journey with Edward Wilson, polar explorer, ornithologist, natural historian, physician and artist), Blissett, Cross, Whitfield and Williamson. The party hoped to arrive in time to witness the hatching of eggs. When they arrived the chicks had hatched in the dead of winter. Blissett made an 8-mile round trip to collect two dead penguins for Wilson's collection. The men were left exhausted due to irregular sleeping patterns, hard work and temperatures dropping to -62°. Blissett suffered worst on this journey, his face was severely frostbitten. The party succeeded in finding several eggs and took two chicks safely back to Discovery for observation, despite capsizing the 11-foot sledge.

The journey back to Hut Point was the coldest of the expedition and colder than any Polar journey they knew of with temperatures dropping to -76°. Wilson (who acted as junior surgeon, zoologist and expedition artist) started a series of sketches in the South Polar Times which still continue to fascinate nature lovers

9 September 1903 Scott embarked on journey to find new road over Ferrar Glacier.

=== Escape from the ice ===
On 5 January 1904 the Morning suddenly appeared on the horizon along with a second relief ship, the Terra Nova, carrying firm instructions from the Admiralty that if Discovery could not be freed in time to return with The relief ships she was to be abandoned and her complement brought home.

Sawing parties continued to try to free Discovery and explosive work undertaken to break up the ice, but Discovery was 20 miles away from open water. Scott, feeling wretched, had almost given up hope and started preparations to abandoned their much loved ship, when on 14 February 1904 the ice inexplicably broke up, by 16 February 1904 following one last explosive charge, the Discovery started her homeward journey.

Blissett married Florence Rose Deighton in Christchurch, New Zealand.

The heroes were welcomed with a mayor's banquet.

The expedition is documented in the Royal Geographical Society journals published at the time of the expedition, in which there is a letter to Scot via the Admiralty from the instigator of the expedition Sir Clements Markham who, when writing about the conduct of the men, said "We particularly desire to express our approval of the zeal and fine conduct of the men under your command ....... Nor would we forget the sister service, so well represented by Lance-Corporal Blissett".

== Medals and recognition ==
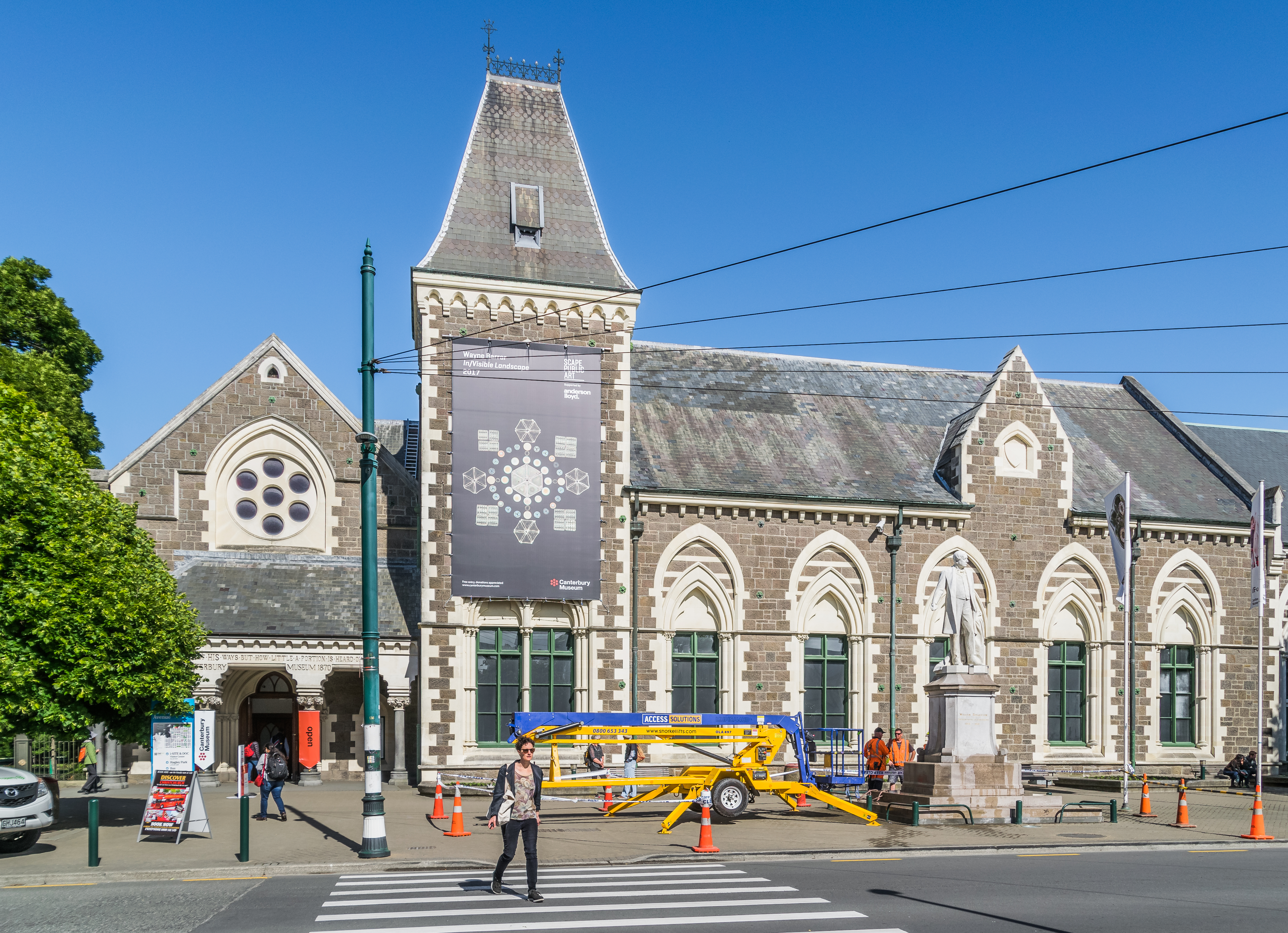
Canterbury Museum, Christchurch

Blissett was awarded the Silver Polar Medal (1904) for his time serving on Discovery.

The medal is on display at Canterbury Museum, Christchurch, New Zealand.

== Life after Discovery ==
1905 Blissett returned to England on Discovery, Florence followed shortly afterwards.

It appears that Florence was actually married when she met and married Blissett, her husband (Alfred Molyneux) successfully filed for divorce in 1907.

In 1911 Blissett (aged 33) lived with Florence in Hull as a Prison Service Warder Grade II.

1 June 1915 to 4 March 1919 Blissett enlisted for a second period of service with the Royal Marines (Service number 18639), he was discharged to 3 Cross Street, Brigg, returning to the Prison Service

28 January 1922 Blissett (43) and his wife (40) return to Lyttelton, New Zealand on board the Dorit, departing from Liverpool.

Blissett appears on New Zealand electoral rolls in Christchurch (1835 and 1838) and at Lyttelton (1946 and 1955), no children are listed.

Blissett died in 1955 and is buried in Christchurch, Florence died in 1960.

DEATH	14 Aug 1955
BURIAL	Ruru Lawn Cemetery Bromley, Christchurch City, Canterbury, New Zealand
PLOT	Block 36. Plot 101
MEMORIAL ID	173168720

=== Posthumous recognition ===
==== Blue Plaque ====
The birth place of Arthur Harry Blissett (1878-1955) explorer on the 1901-1904 "Discovery" expedition to the Antarctic with Capt. Robert Falcon Scott	Arthur Blissett Blue Plaque	The birthplace of Arthur Harry Blissett (1878-1955). Background: St. Wulfram's Church
