= HMS Ringarooma =

Pearl-class cruiser

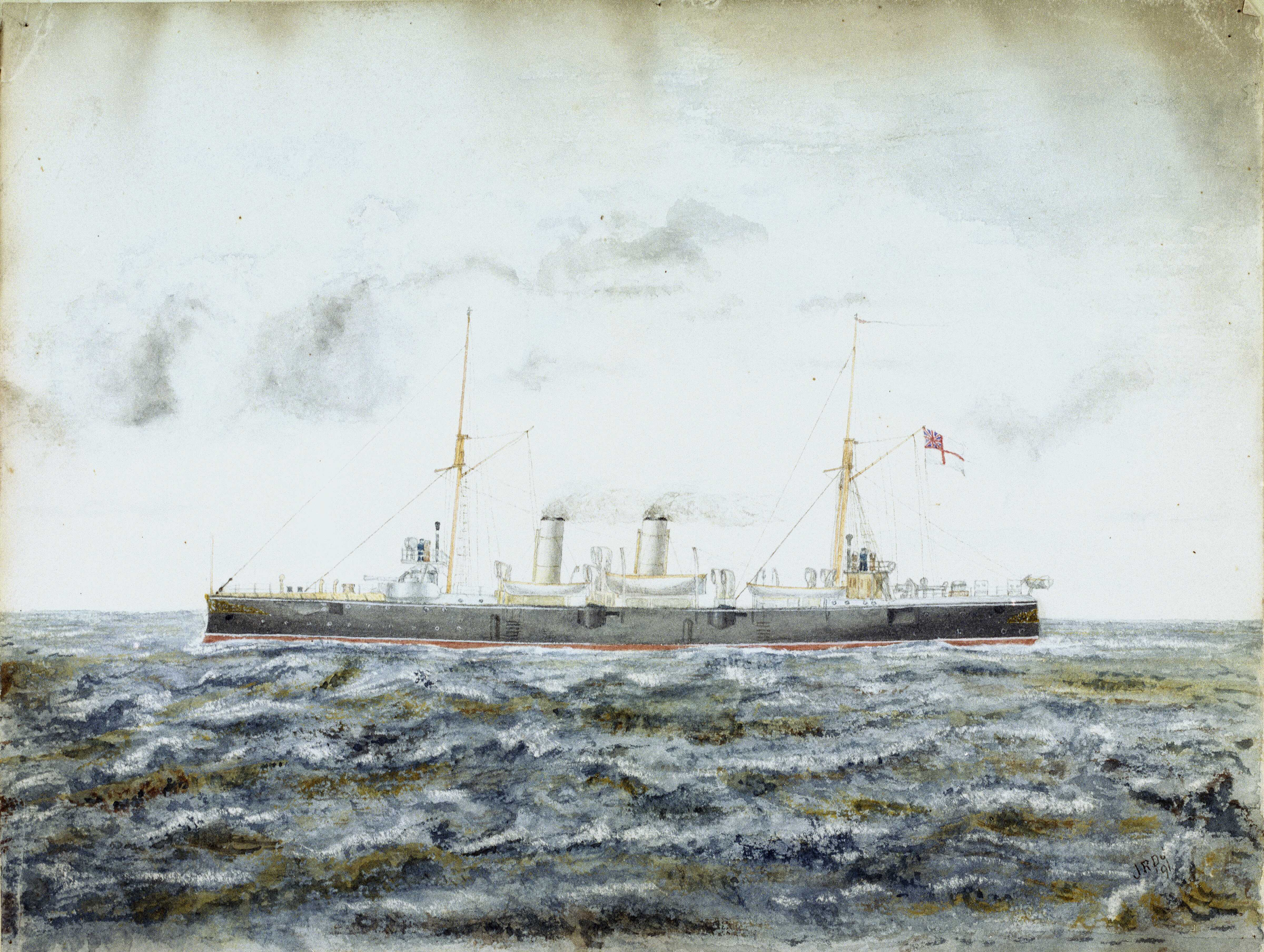
- Painting of HMS Ringarooma c. 1891

History

United Kingdom
- Name: HMS Psyche
- Builder: J & G Thomson, Glasgow
- Launched: 10 December 1889
- Completed: 3 February 1891
- Renamed: Ringarooma (1890)
- Fate: Sold in May 1906 for breaking up

General characteristics
- Class & type: Pearl-class cruiser
- Displacement: 2,575 tons
- Length: 278 ft (85 m) oa; 256 ft (78 m) pp
- Beam: 41 ft (12 m)
- Draught: 15 ft 6 in (4.72 m)
- Installed power: 4 × double-ended cylindrical boilers; 7,500 ihp (5,600 kW) on forced draught
- Propulsion: 2 × 3-cylinder triple-expansion steam engines; 2 screws
- Speed: 19 knots (35 km/h)
- Complement: 217
- Armament: 8 × QF 4.7 inch (120 mm) guns; 8 × 3-pounder guns; 4 × machine guns; 2 × 14-inch (356 mm) torpedo tubes
- Armour: Deck: 1–2 in (25–51 mm); Gunshields: 2 in (51 mm); Conning tower: 3 in (76 mm)

HMS Ringarooma was a Pearl-class cruiser of the Royal Navy, originally named HMS Psyche, built by J & G Thomson, Glasgow and launched on 10 December 1889. Renamed on 2 April 1890, as Ringarooma as part of the Auxiliary Squadron of the Australia Station. She arrived in Sydney with the squadron on 5 September 1891. She was damaged after running aground on a reef at Makelula Island, New Hebrides on 31 August 1894 and was pulled off by the French cruiser Duchaffault. Between 1897 and 1900 she was in reserve at Sydney. On 15 February Captain Frederick St. George Rich was appointed in command. She left the Australia Station on 22 August 1904. She was sold for £8500 in May 1906 to Forth Shipbreaking Company for breaking up.

In 1905, a longboat of the Ringarooma was found washed ashore at the beach at Meerup. The boat, alongside other deck fittings of the ship, was washed overboard during a storm, which had raged along the coastline seven or eight years previously. The ship had been attempting to round Cape Leeuwin but was forced to head back to Albany. Despite its age, the boat was found in good condition.
