= Wilfred Norman Edwards =

British paleobotanist and curator (1890–1956)

Wilfred Norman Edwards FGS (13 June 1890 – 17 December 1956) was a British paleobotanist and keeper of geology at the Natural History Museum from 1938 to 1955 and was awarded the Lyell Medal in 1955.

== Education ==
Edwards was born in Peterborough, and went to school at Cambridge County School. He trained as a botanist, studying at the University of Cambridge School of Botany under Albert Seward, professor of botany, and others. He attended Christ's College, Cambridge as a scholar, and graduated with a BA degree in 1912.

== Career ==
After graduation, Edwards worked in Germany with paleobotanist Walther Gothan, before starting work at the Natural History Museum in 1913. During the First World War, he served with the Royal Army Medical Corps in the Balkans, and only returned to museum work in 1919. In December 1922, Edwards was elected a Fellow of the Geological Society, London, at which point he was an assistant in the geological department of the museum. He was keeper of geology at the museum from 1938 to 1955. He was the first paleobotanist to be employed by the museum, and he worked on fossil plants for much of his career, publishing numerous papers and reports. Early in his career, Edwards recognised fossil plants in samples that had been collected during early geological expeditions to Antarctica; notably, the identification of leaves of the plant Glossopteris and fossil wood Rhexoxylon in samples collected by Hartley Ferrar from Victoria Land during the British Discovery Expedition of 1901 to 1904.

Edwards' career took him to many parts of Europe and Africa to collect specimens. In his obituary, Edwards' colleague Maurice Wonnacott recounts how one collecting expedition in north Africa involved a 500 kilometre round-trip by camel from Touggourt to Tozeur. In 1929, Edwards travelled overland the length of Africa, from Cape Town to Cairo.

== Recognition and awards ==
Edwards served on the council of the Geological Society of London from 1936 to 1945. From 1940 to 1944, he was secretary, and from 1944 to 1945 was vice president of the society. He was awarded the Lyell Fund in 1933, and in 1955, he was awarded the Lyell medal of the Geological Society in recognition of his contributions to paleobotany.

== Family ==
Edwards married Winifred How in 1921, and they later lived in Hitchin, Hertfordshire. Edwards collapsed and died on Hitchin station on 17 Dececember 1956.

== Selected works ==
- Edwards, W.N. (1931) Guide to an exhibition illustrating the early history of palaeontology, British Museum (Natural History) special guide no. 8. London: Trustees of the British Museum, 68 pp.
- Edwards, W.N. (1935) Guide to the fossil plants in the British Museum (Natural History), 2nd ed. London: Trustees of the British Museum, 73 pp.
- Edwards, W.N. (1967) The early history of palaeontology, British Museum (Natural History) publications no. 658. London: Trustees of the British Museum (Natural history), 58 pp.
