= Hartley T. Ferrar =

Irish-born geologist and explorer

Hartley Travers Ferrar (28 January 1879 – April 1932) was a geologist who accompanied Robert Scott's first Antarctic expedition.

== Biography ==
Ferrar was born at 3 Grosvenor Place, Dalkey, near Dublin, in 1879, the son of John Edgar Ferrar, a bank clerk, and Mary Holmes Hartley.

He moved to South Africa at an early age with his parents, receiving his early schooling at Simonstown school near Cape Town. He was sent back to Oundle School in England for his secondary education, and then went to Sidney Sussex College, Cambridge, where he studied geology. He excelled at sports, and many of his team photographs are archived at his old school and college respectively. On going down from Cambridge, when rowing at Henley, he was offered the post of Geologist on Robert Scott's first Antarctic expedition, and became the youngest member of the scientific staff.

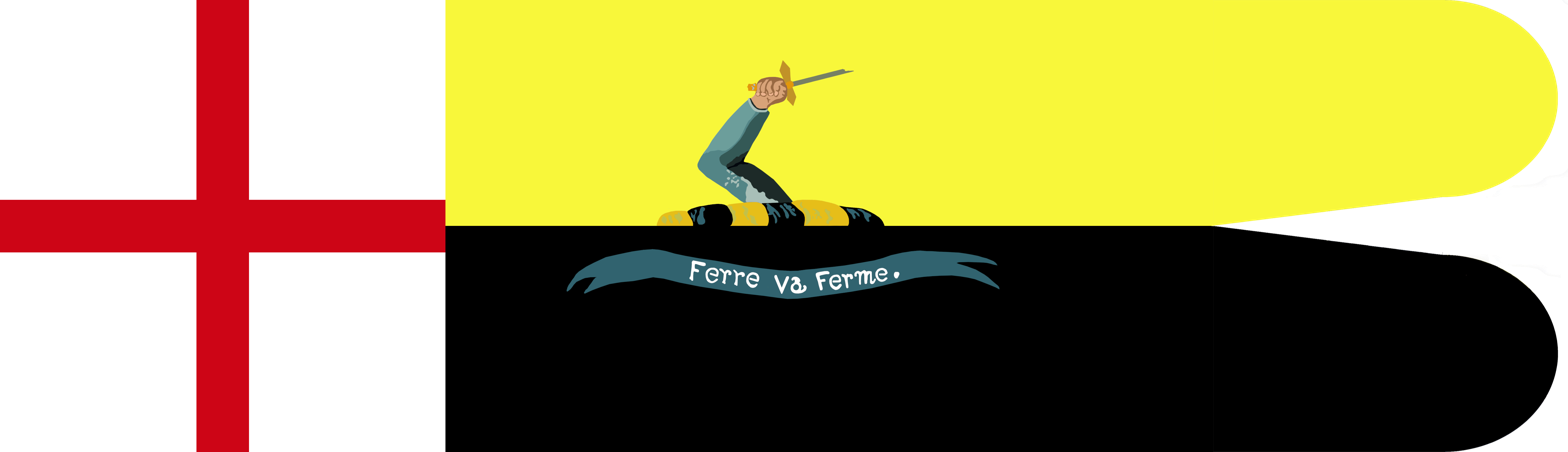
Sledge flag used by Ferrar in Antarctica during the Discovery Expedition

He sailed on the RRS Discovery, and met his future wife (Gladys Anderson) when the ship was in New Zealand. The Discovery then sailed south and found suitable anchorage in McMurdo Sound in the Ross Sea – the expedition was to spend two winters there, as the ship was frozen in and could not get free of the ice in the first summer. Ferrar took an active part in exploring and in carrying out scientific studies (e.g. sea water salinity measurements) as well as his primary responsibility of geological surveying. He accompanied Ernest Shackleton and Edward Wilson amongst others on sledging trips, and it was in the Antarctic summer of 1903 that he went on his major sledging trip of discovery into the Western Mountains of Victoria Land. He travelled to the upper Taylor Glacier, and found coal deposits at an altitude of 8,000 ft. He also characterised a broad layer of sandstone found in the region, which became known as the Ferrar or Beacon Supergroup layer. The Ferrar Glacier was named after him, and he unwittingly discovered the first fossils found on what was then known to be the Antarctic mainland. One of the many rock samples which was returned to the National History Museum in London was split open by W. N. Edwards in 1928, and found to contain two fossilised leaves of Glossopteris indica. Ferrar returned on the Discovery in 1904, and spent the next year writing up the geological report of the expedition. He was then appointed to the Geological Survey in Egypt, and worked there until the First World War broke out, when he took his family back to New Zealand. He returned to serve with the 1st (Canterbury) Regiment in Palestine, working principally on aerial surveys and intelligence.

After the war he took up a position with the New Zealand Geological Survey, and carried out extensive field work in both the North and South Islands. He obtained his PhD whilst working for the service, but died in Wellington after an operation in 1932. Ferrar Peak in the Cloudy Range of South Island is named after him. Various of his polar relics are held by the Scott Polar Research Museum (Cambridge), the Canterbury Museum in New Zealand and the Discovery itself at Dundee, Scotland.
