= Colwell Massif =

Mountain in Ross Dependency, Antarctica

- Location within Antarctica

Geography
- Location: Victoria Land, Antarctica
- Range coordinates: 78°2′S 161°33′E
- Parent range: Royal Society Range

The Colwell Massif (78°2′S 161°33′E) is a rugged rock massif, about 4 nautical miles (7.4 km; 4.6 mi) long, rising to 2,635 metres (8,645 ft) between Palais Glacier, Ferrar Glacier, and Rotunda Glacier, in the Royal Society Range, Victoria Land, Antarctica.

== Name ==
The Colwell Massif was named by the United States Advisory Committee on Antarctic Names (US-ACAN) in 1994 after Rita R. Colwell, marine microbiologist who has conducted field research in Antarctica; member of National Science Board (1983–90) who chaired Presidential committee on National Science Foundation roles in the polar regions; from 1991, President, Maryland Biotechnology Institute, University of Maryland.

== Features ==
Features of the massif, and nearby features, include:

=== Mosley-Thompson Cirques ===
78.016497°S 161.505997°E Prominent steep-walled cirques that indent the west part of Colwell Massif. Named by Advisory Committee on Antarctic Names (US-ACAN) (1994) after Ellen Stone Mosley-Thompson, glaciologist, Byrd Polar Research Center, Ohio State University, who from 1974 analyzed ice samples from Antarctica and conducted field research at South Pole, Siple Station, and Plateau Remote Camp.

=== Ugolini Peak ===
78°01′S 161°31′E. A sharp rock peak, over 2,200 metres (7,200 ft) high, surmounting the central part of a large ice-free massif 6 nautical miles (11 km; 6.9 mi) south of Knobhead, at the south side of upper Ferrar Glacier. Named by US-ACAN for Fiorenzo C. Ugolini, who studied Antarctic soil processes in the McMurdo Sound area in 1961-62 and 1962-63.

=== Ugolini Ridge ===
78.03943°S 161.46970°E A ridge that extends west from Ugolini Peak, Colwell Massif. Named by US-ACAN (1994) in association with Ugolini Peak during joint New Zealand–United States mapping programme.

=== Grootes Peak ===
78.05°S 161.6°E A peak rising to 2,635 metres (8,645 ft) high in the south extremity of Colwell Massif. Named by US-ACAN (1994) after Pieter Meiert Grootes of the Quaternary Isotope Laboratory, University of Washington, 1977-94; very active in USAP ice-coring activity including investigation of Taylor Dome; director of the Carbon-14 laboratory at Christian Albrechts University in Kiel, Germany from 1994.

=== Waddington Glacier ===
78°03′S 161°27′E. A tributary glacier, 3 nautical miles (5.6 km; 3.5 mi) long, flowing west-northwest along the south side of Ugolini Peak, to enter Palais Glacier. Named by US-ACAN in 1994 after Edwin D. Waddington, geophysicist, University of Washington; from 1990, field investigator at Taylor Dome in an extended program of glacier geophysical studies.

=== Brown Scarp ===
78°04′S 161°24′E. A narrow wedgelike massif which has a notable southern escarpment but moderate northern slopes. The feature is 1.5 nautical miles (2.8 km; 1.7 mi) long and rises to 2,410 metres (7,910 ft) high between Palais Glacier and Waddington Glacier. Named by US-ACAN in 1994 after Arthur J. Brown, Deputy Program Director (1982-90), ITT Antarctic Services, Inc., corporate contractor to NSF in Antarctica; from 1994, Head of Safety, Environment, and Health Implementation Team, Office of Polar Programs, NSF.

=== Kenney Nunatak ===
78°04′S 161°30′E. A conspicuous nunatak rising in Waddington Glacier, 1.5 nautical miles (2.8 km; 1.7 mi) south-southwest of Ugolini Peak. Named by US-ACAN in 1994 after Frank J. Kenney, USGS cartographer, member of USGS field team for the International Global Positioning System (GPS) Campaign at Byrd Station, McMurdo Station, and Pine Island Bay area, 1991-92. The team established the first continuous-tracking GPS reference station in Antarctica.

=== Koci Cliffs ===
78.0666667°S 161.6°E Arcuate cliffs, 2,424 metres (7,953 ft) high, standing 1 nautical mile (1.9 km; 1.2 mi) south of Colwell Massif. The cliffs trend west-southwest–east-northeast across the head of Waddington Glacier and locally mark the divide between glaciers flowing north to Ferrar Glacier or south to Skelton Glacier. Named by US-ACAN (1994) after Bruce R. Koci, Polar Ice Coring Office (PICO), University of Nebraska-Lincoln, an authority in ice drilling with broad experience for many years in Antarctica and Greenland. He provided support to the Antarctic Muon and Neutrino Detection Array (AMANDA) at the South Pole, 1993-2001, and to other parts of the United States Antarctic Program through the 2004-05 field season.

=== Lear Spire ===
78°05′S 161°30′E. A distinctive pointed spire rising to 2,470 metres (8,100 ft) high, 3 nautical miles (5.6 km; 3.5 mi) south of Ugolini Peak. Named by US-ACAN in 1994 after D'Ann Figard Lear, USGS, librarian for the Scientific Committee on Antarctic Research (SCAR) library (Reston, VA), which holds an extensive collection of Antarctic photography, maps, and geodetic control data.

=== Henderson Pyramid ===
78°06′S 161°27′E. A pointed, mostly ice-covered mountain, 2,450 metres (8,040 ft) high, located 4 nautical miles (7.4 km; 4.6 mi) south-southwest of Ugolini Peak. Mapped by United States Geological Survey (USGS) from surveys and United States Navy aerial photographs, 1956-61. Named by US-ACAN in 1994 after Thomas E. Henderson, cartographer, USGS; field team member on Ellsworth Mountains Geodetic Control Project, 1979-80; leader, USGS, northern Victoria Land Geodetic Team, 1981-82; USGS satellite surveying team at South Pole Station, winter party 1982.

=== Battleship ===
78.015281°S 161.733597°E. An elongated ice-free massif 3 nautical miles (5.6 km; 3.5 mi) long between Rotunda Glacier and Blankenship Glacier, southern tributaries to Ferrar Glacier. Descriptively named by New Zealand Geographic Board (NZGB) in 1994. The shape of the massif resembles the superstructure and forward part of a battleship.

=== La Count Mountain ===
78°00′S 161°42′E. A mostly ice-free mountain, 1,875 metres (6,152 ft) high, forming the northern portion of Battleship (massif), located between Rotunda Glacier, Blankenship Glacier, and Ferrar Glacier. The mountain was studied by USGS geologist Warren Hamilton during the 1958-59 season. Named in 1992 by US-ACAN after Ronald La Count, Manager, Polar Operations Section, Division of Polar Programs, National Science Foundation, 1984-90.

== Sources ==
- Alberts, Fred G., ed. (1995), Geographic Names of the Antarctic (PDF) (2 ed.), United States Board on Geographic Names This article incorporates public domain material from websites or documents of the United States Board on Geographic Names.
- "Battleship", Geographic Names Information System, United States Geological Survey, United States Department of the Interior
- "Grootes Peak", Geographic Names Information System, United States Geological Survey, United States Department of the Interior
- "Koci Cliffs", Geographic Names Information System, United States Geological Survey, United States Department of the Interior
- "Mosley-Thompson Cirques", Geographic Names Information System, United States Geological Survey, United States Department of the Interior
- Ugolini Ridge, AADC: Australian Antarctic Data Centre

This article incorporates public domain material from websites or documents of the United States Geological Survey.
