= Table Mountain (Antarctica) =

Mountain in Antarctica

Table Mountain (77°57′S 162°00′E) is a large flat mountain rising to over 2,000 metres (6,600 ft) immediately south of the junction of the Emmanuel Glacier and Ferrar Glacier in Victoria Land. Discovered and given this descriptive name by the BrNAE (1901–04) under Scott.

== Location ==
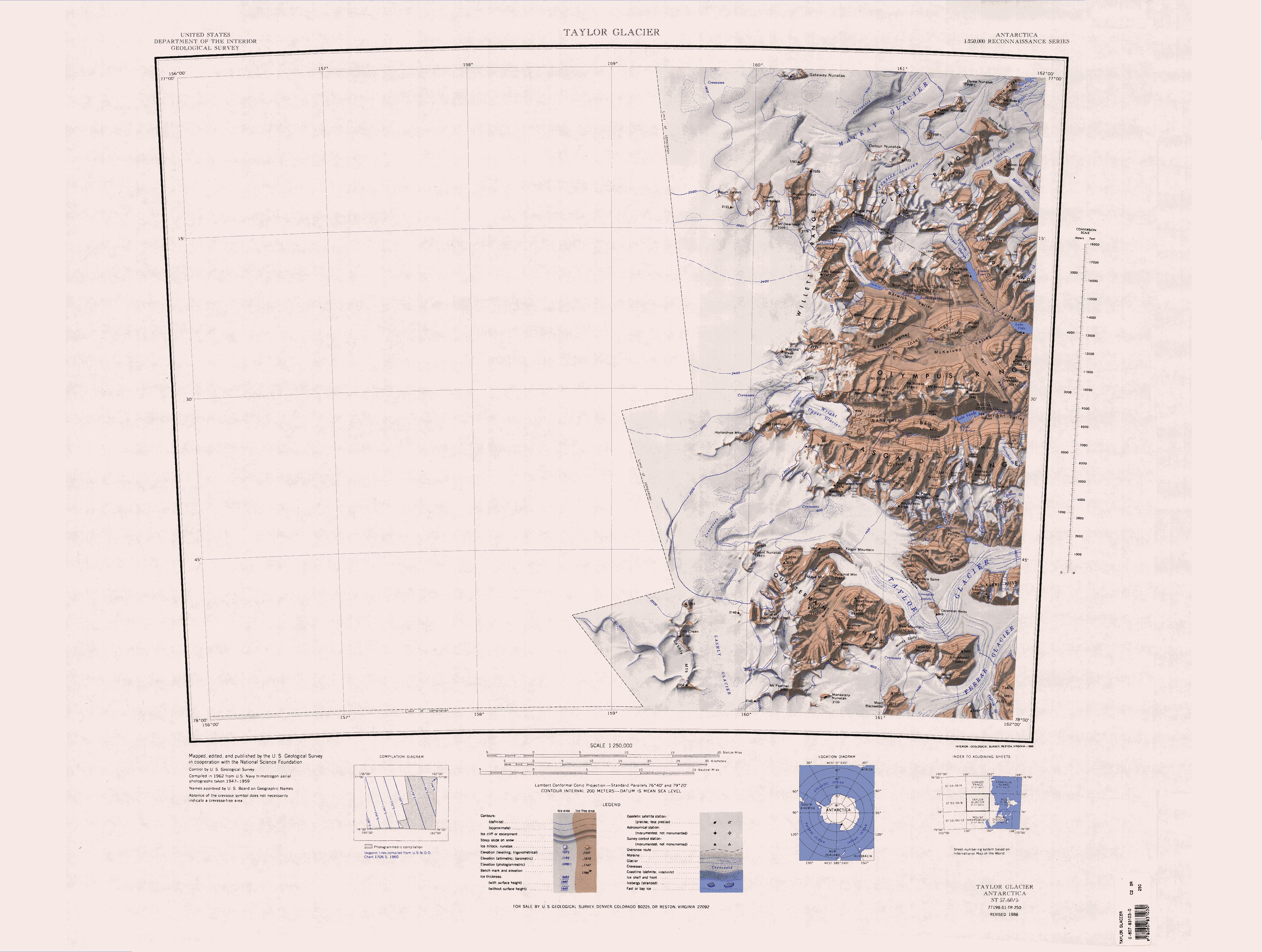
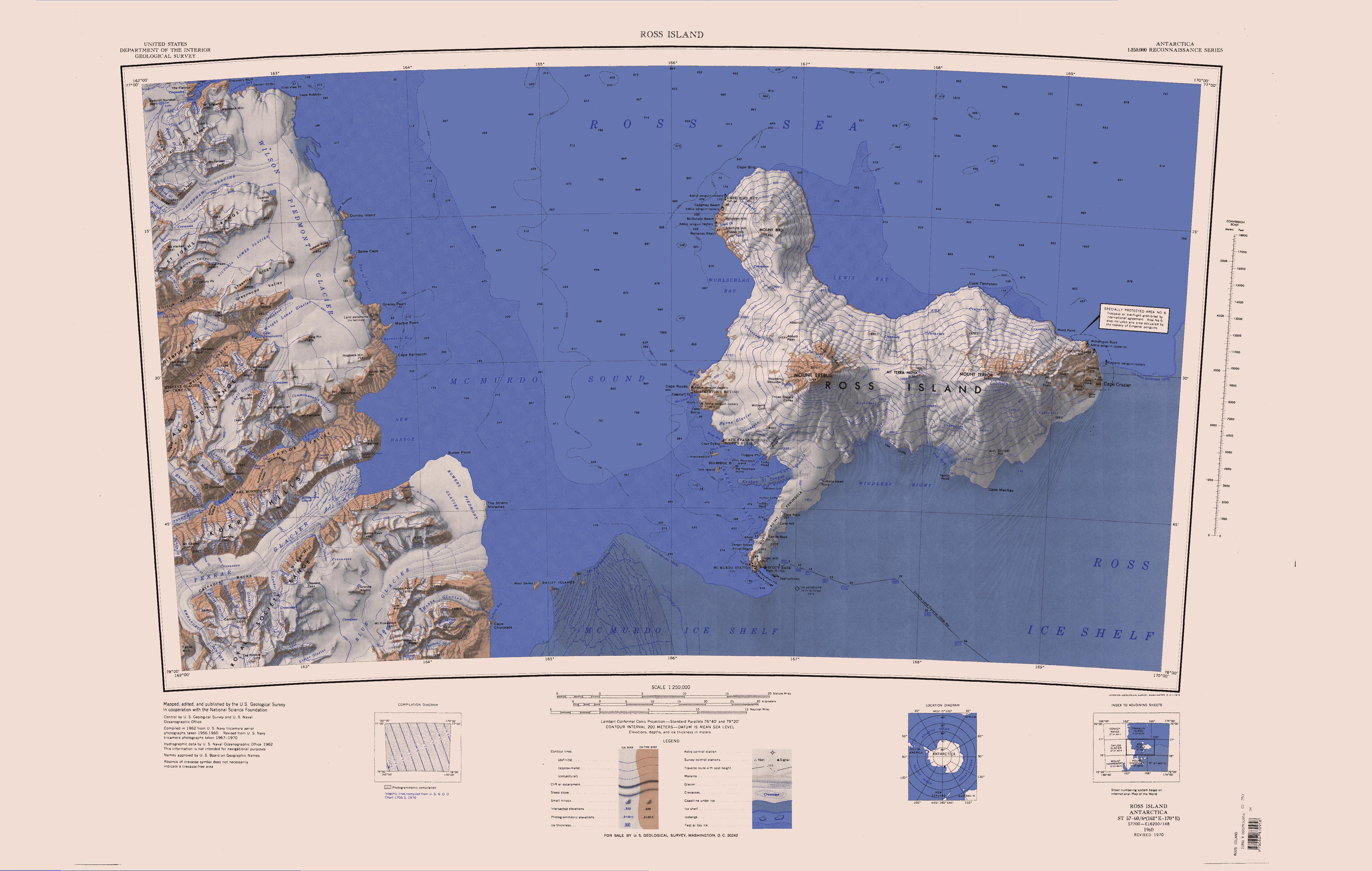

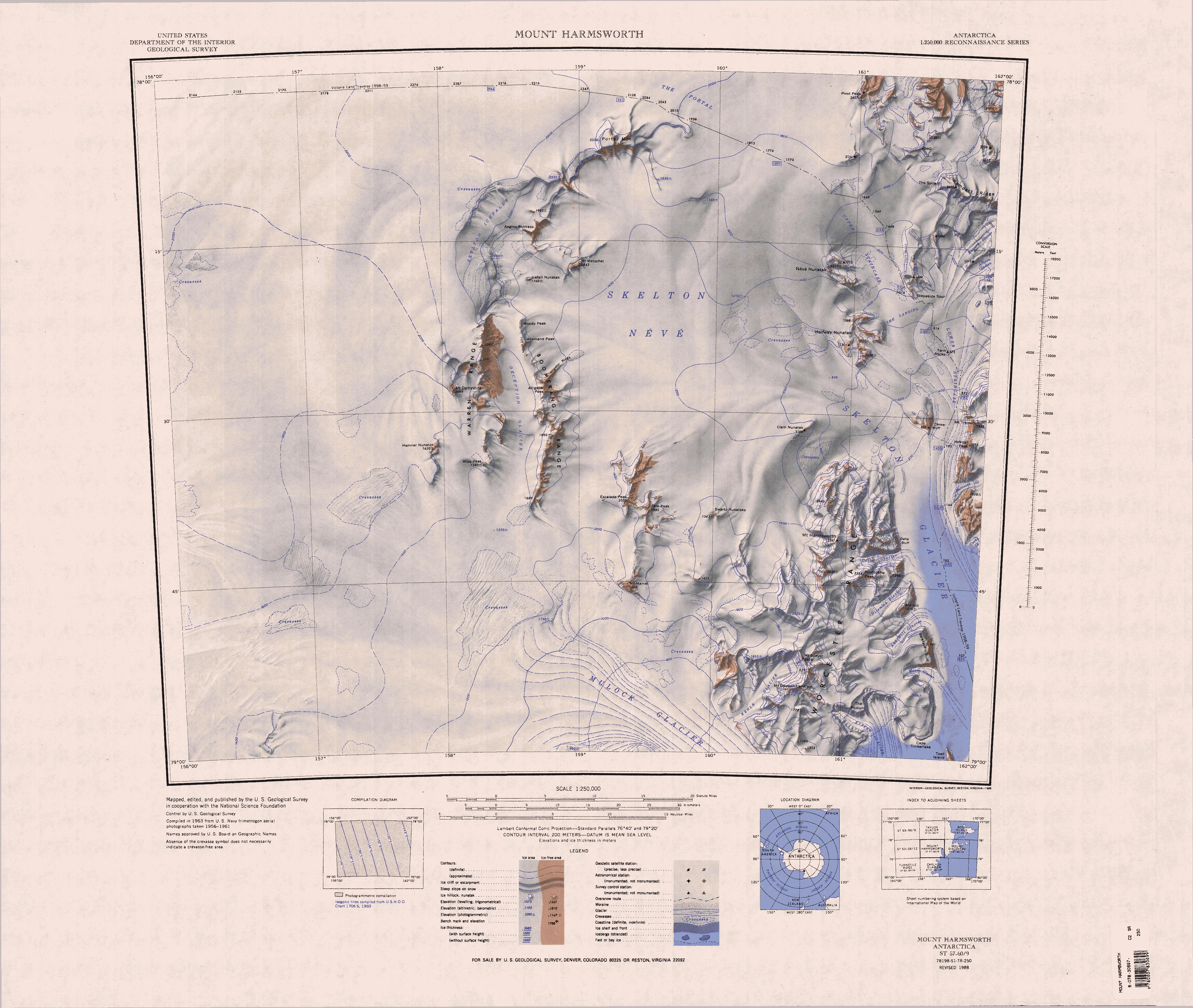
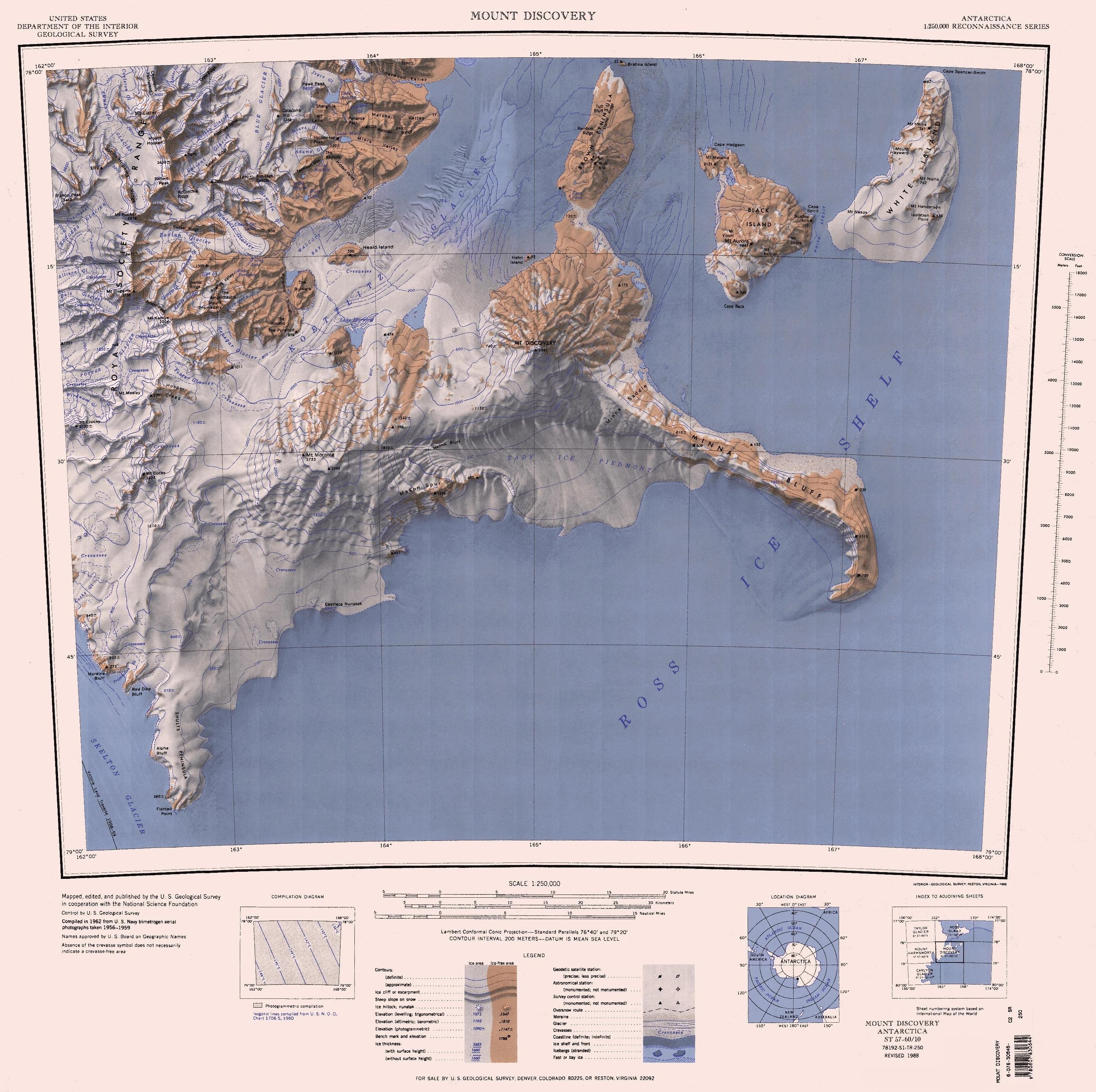
Table Mountain in the center, where the four maps meet

Table Mountain is the northwest point of the Royal Society Range. It lies to the east of Tedrow Glacier, which flows north to join the Ferrar Glacier, which runs east past the north face of the mountain. To the east of the mountain, Emmanuel Glacier also flows north to the Ferrar Glacier. Ridges extend south from the mountain towards Johns Hopkins Ridge.

== Features ==
Features of the mountain, and nearby features include:

=== Bubble Spur ===
77°59′S 161°50′E. A flattish rock spur that separates the lower ends of Blankenship Glacier and Tedrow Glacier, to the west of Table Mountain. The name is one of a group in the area associated with surveying applied in 1993 by New Zealand Geographic Board (NZGB). A bubble on a surveying instrument is used to indicate its directional tilt and to facilitate its leveling.

=== Columnar Valley ===
77°58′S 161°57′E. A valley trending northwest between The Handle and Table Mountain in the northwest part of Royal Society Range. Descriptively named by Alan Sherwood, New Zealand Geological Survey (NZGS) field party leader in the area, 1987-88, after the columnar-jointed dolerite that forms the valley walls.

=== Navajo Butte ===
77°58′S 162°03′E. A sandstone butte which displays large-scale cross bedding, rising from the south-central part of Table Mountain. Named by Alan Sherwood, NZGS party leader in the area, 1987-88, after the famous Navajo sandstone of Utah.

=== Sphinx Valley ===
77°59′S 162°01′E. A shallow hanging valley, 1 nautical mile (1.9 km; 1.2 mi) long, running northwest parallel to Columnar Valley and terminating just west of the summit of Table Mountain. Named from the distinctive rock formations along its northwest wall, one of which is a particularly good likeness of the Egyptian Sphinx. Named by Alan Sherwood, NZGS party leader in the area, 1987-88.

=== The Handle ===
78°00′S 161°59′E. An elongated massif 1.5 nautical miles (2.8 km; 1.7 mi) southwest of Table Mountain in the northwest part of Royal Society Range. The feature was descriptively named by Alan Sherwood, NZGS field party leader in the area, 1987-88. Its size and position in relation to an associated ridge suggest a handle to a sickle.

=== Sickle Ridge ===
78.016667°S 162.166667°E A sickle-shaped ridge, 5 nautical miles (9.3 km; 5.8 mi) long and rising to over 2,600 metres (8,500 ft) high. The ridge extends southward from The Handle between Tedrow Glacier and Emmanuel Glacier and terminates at Murcray Heights. Named descriptively by New Zealand Geographic Board (NZGB) (1994) following work in the area in the 1987-88 field season by NZGS geologist Alan Sherwood.

=== Murcray Heights ===
78.0833333°S 162.2166667°E A cluster of prominent peaks that rise to 3,091 metres (10,141 ft) high at the south end of Sickle Ridge, Royal Society Range, Victoria Land. Named by Advisory Committee on Antarctic Names (US-ACAN) (1994) after the Murcray brothers, David G. and Frank H., and Frank J. Murcray (son of David G.), University of Denver, long term specialists in infrared spectroscopy in Antarctica.

=== Platform Spur ===
77°59′S 162°10′E. A wedge-shaped sandstone platform which rises to 2,350 metres (7,710 ft) high and tapers to the northeast, between Bindschadler Glacier and Jezek Glacier in the northwest part of Royal Society Range, Victoria Land. It was descriptively named by Alan Sherwood, NZGS party leader in the area, 1987-88.

=== Jezek Glacier ===
77°59′S 162°13′E. A glacier on the southeast side of Platform Spur, flowing northeast into Emmanuel Glacier. Named by US-ACAN in 1992 after Kenneth C. Jezek, geophysicist with CRREL and NOAA, 1983-89; in 12 visits to the Arctic and Antarctic, conducted geophysical surveys using remote sensing techniques on measurement and properties of terrestrial ice and sea ice with work at Dome Charlie, Ross Ice Shelf and Weddell Sea; Director, Byrd Polar Research Center, from 1989.

=== Mount Bockheim ===
78.0352778°S 161.9633333°E A peak, 2,749 metres (9,019 ft) high, at the northwest end of Maine Ridge. The peak is bordered north and south by Tedrow Glacier and Matataua Glacier. Named by Advisory Committee on Antarctic Names (US-ACAN) (1995) after James G. Bockheim, Department of Soil Science, University of Wisconsin, Madison, who made soil development studies of McMurdo Dry Valleys in 12 field seasons during the 1970s and 1980s.

== Sources ==
- Alberts, Fred G., ed. (1995), Geographic Names of the Antarctic (PDF) (2 ed.), United States Board on Geographic Names This article incorporates public domain material from websites or documents of the United States Board on Geographic Names.
- "Mount Bockheim", Geographic Names Information System, United States Geological Survey, United States Department of the Interior
- "Murcray Heights", Geographic Names Information System, United States Geological Survey, United States Department of the Interior
- "Sickle Ridge", Geographic Names Information System, United States Geological Survey, United States Department of the Interior
