= Ferrar Glacier =

Glacier in Antarctica

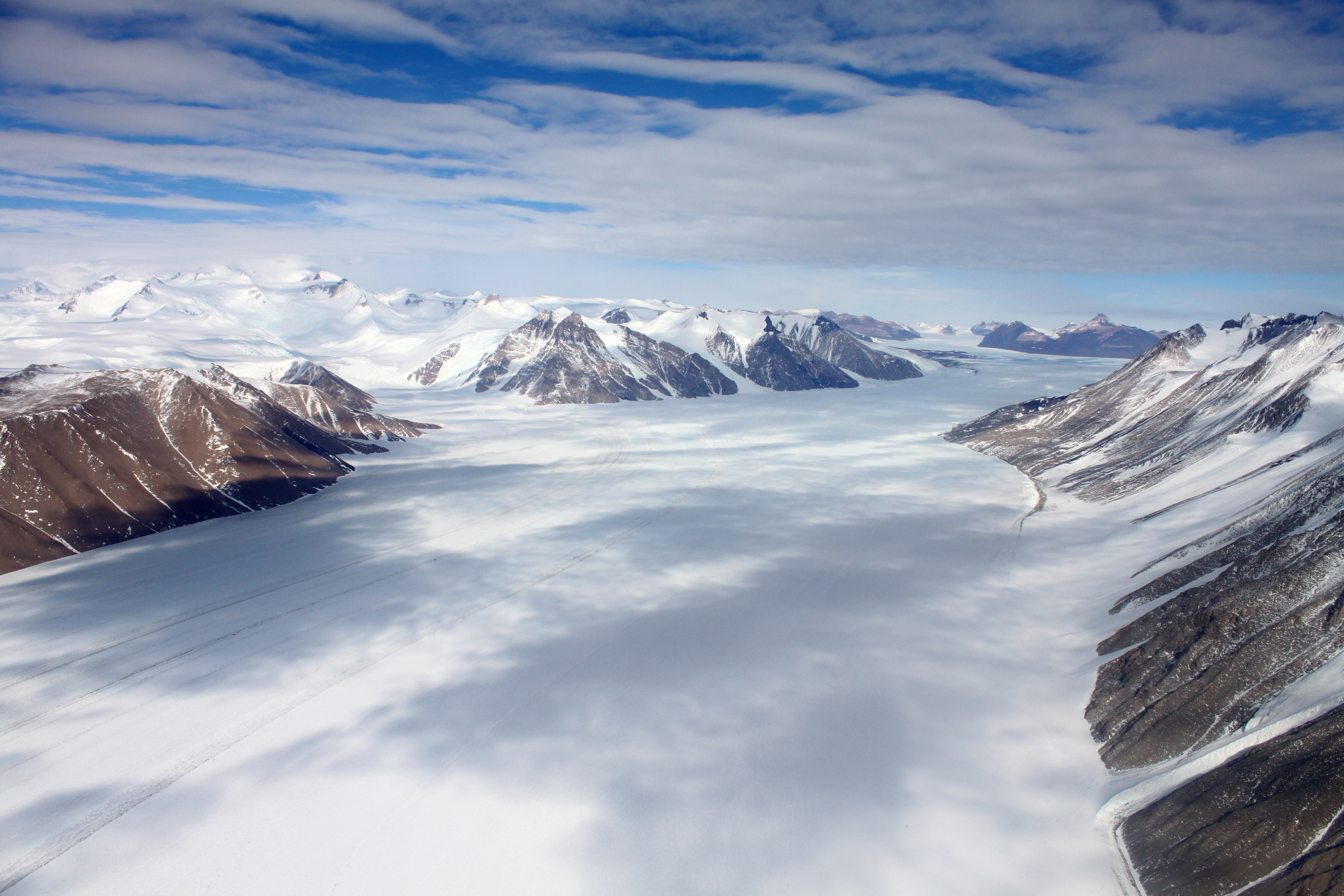
- The Ferrar Glacier in 2009

- Location within Antarctica
- Location: Victoria Land
- Coordinates: 77°49′S 162°42′E
- Length: 35 nautical miles (65 km; 40 mi)
- Thickness: unknown
- Terminus: New Harbour
- Status: unknown
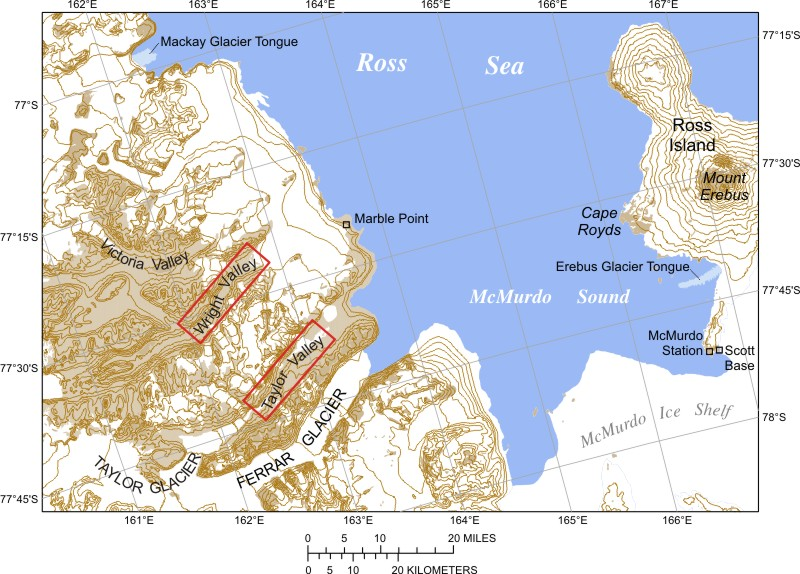
- Ferrar Glacier and McMurdo Sound, Antarctica

The Ferrar Glacier (77°46′S 163°00′E) is a glacier in Antarctica. It is about 35 nautical miles (65 km; 40 mi) long, flowing from the plateau of Victoria Land west of the Royal Society Range to New Harbour in McMurdo Sound. The glacier makes a right (east) turn northeast of Knobhead, where it where it is apposed, i.e., joined in Siamese-twin fashion, to Taylor Glacier. From there, it continues east along the south side of Kukri Hills to New Harbor.

== Discovery and naming ==
The Ferrar Glacier was discovered by the British National Antarctic Expedition, (1901–04) under Captain Robert Falcon Scott, who named it after Hartley T. Ferrar, geologist of the expedition. The name Ferrar Glacier was originally applied both to the part of the glacier below its right turn and to the present Taylor Glacier. Thomas Griffith Taylor, geologist of the British Antarctic Expedition, 1910–13 under Scott, found evidence that these are not two parts of a single glacier but are two glaciers apposed. With this discovery, Scott gave the names Ferrar Glacier and Taylor Glacier essentially as now applied; the Taylor Glacier makes a left turn at Cavendish Rocks and drains east along the north side of the Kukri Hills.

== Glaciology ==
The Ferrar Glacier flows 150 kilometres (93 mi) from the Taylor Dome east to a floating terminus in McMurdo Sound. Flow is slow, usually less than 20 metres (66 ft) per year. Large-scale topographic features strongly affect the glacier's path, as the ice thins and flows over them. There are two topographic dams. At 95 kilometres (59 mi) upstream from the grounding line the ice thickness is reduced to 200 metres (660 ft), and at 39 kilometres (24 mi) from the grounding line it is reduced to about 40 metres (130 ft). The profile of the glacier has not changed much in the past 4 million years, unlike other glaciers in the region. During the Last Glacial Maximum there were only insignificant changes in the upper reaches of the glacier, and during the present Holocene there was no pronounced thinning.

== Course ==
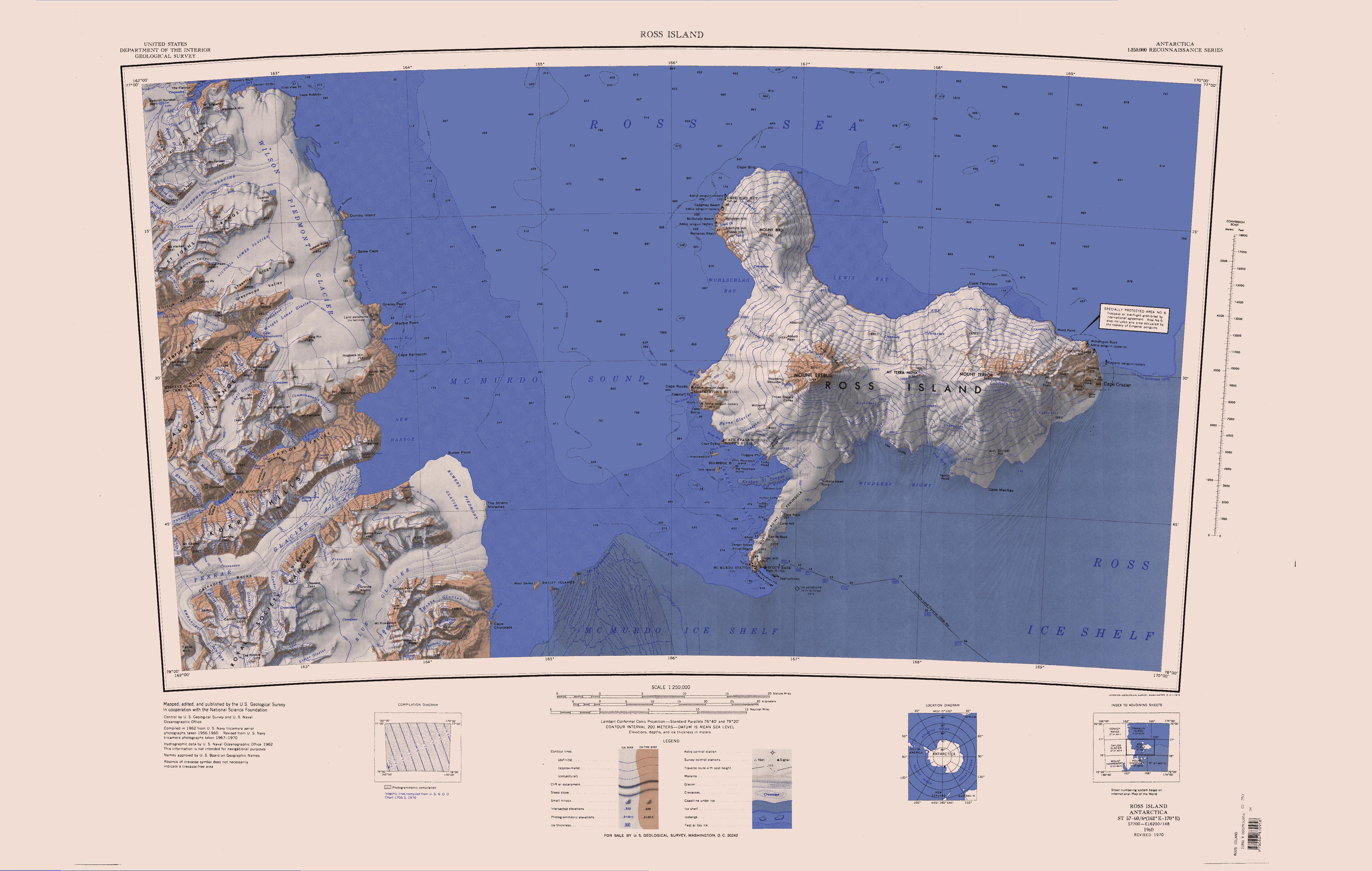
Lower course (south of map)

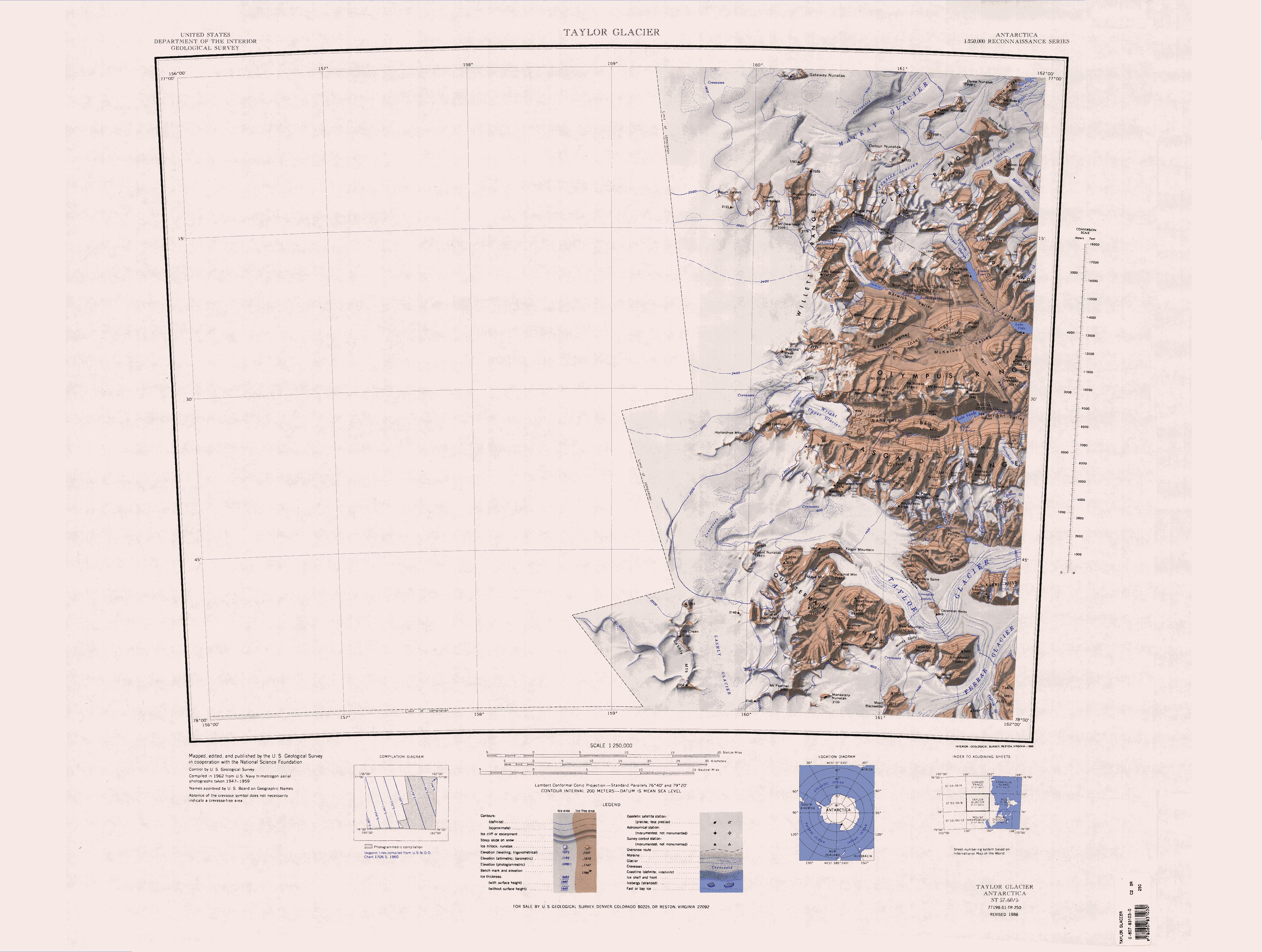
Upper course (south east of map)

The Ferrar Glacier originates in the Taylor Dome near the Antarctic Plateau, to the east of Mount Blackwelder. It flows northeast, and is fed by Tedrow Glacier just west of Table Mountain. Past Knobhead part of the left side of the glacier splits off to feed Taylor Glacier, to the north. The Ferrar Glacier turns east to flow past the steep Kukri Hills to the north and the Royal Society Range to the south. It is joined from the right (south) by Emmanuel Glacier, Zoller Glacier, Darkowski Glacier, Bol Glacier, Condit Glacier, Descent Glacier and Overflow Glacier. From the right it is joined by Kitticarrara Glacier and Double Curtain Glacier before flowing into New Harbor between Mount Barnes to the north and Butter Point to the south.

== Head ==
=== Taylor Dome ===
77°40′S 157°40′E An elliptical ice dome, 43 nautical miles (80 km; 49 mi) long east-southeast–west-northwest and 16 miles (26 km) wide, rising to 2,400 metres (7,900 ft), centered about 29 nautical miles (54 km; 33 mi) west-northwest Mount Crean, Lashly Mountains. The feature was delineated by the SPRI-NSF-TUD airborne radio echo sounding program, 1967–79. The name was first used by David J. Drewry of SPRI in 1980. The dome is one of the local sources of ice to the Taylor Glacier, from which it is named. Approved by US-ACAN in 1994. Not: McDoom, McMurdo Dome, Taylor Ice-Dome.

=== Monastery Nunatak ===
77°58′S 160°35′E A spectacular isolated nunatak at the head of Ferrar Glacier, between Mount Feather and Pivot Peak. A cap of pale sandstone, with vertical walls, standing above a horizontal base of black dolerite, strongly suggests a Tibetan monastery. Named by the New Zealand Northern Survey Party of the CTAE (1958-59).

== Left tributaries ==
Tributaries from the left (north) include:

=== Hedley Glacier ===
77°49′S 162°07′E. A small glacier from Mount Coates in the Kukri Hills, Victoria Land, flowing south into Ferrar Glacier. Named by the Western Journey Party of British Antarctic Expedition (BrAE), 1910-13, probably for Charles Hedley, of the Australian Museum, whose studies and reports on the Mollusca contributed to Scott's BrAE, 1910-13, and to BrAE, 1907-09, led by Shackleton.

=== Dun Glacier ===
77°48′S 162°14′E. A short, steep tributary to the Ferrar Glacier. It descends the southern side of Kukri Hills midway between Mount Coates and Sentinel Peak. Named by the Western Journey Party led by Thomas Griffith Taylor of the BrAE (1910-13) under Scott.

=== Kitticarrara Glacier ===
77°43′S 163°02′E. Short, steep glacier 1 nautical mile (1.9 km; 1.2 mi) south of Howard Glacier in the Kukri Hills, flowing east-southeast into Ferrar Glacier. Named by the Western Journey Party, led by Griffith Taylor, of the BrAE, 1910-13. The name was suggested by Frank Debenham after a sheep station in New South Wales.

=== Double Curtain Glacier ===
77°39′S 163°31′E. Small glacier on the south slope of the Kukri Hills, just southwest of Mount Barnes, flowing toward the mouth of Ferrar Glacier. Mapped by the BrAE under Scott, 1910-13, and so named by them because of its shape.

== Right tributaries ==
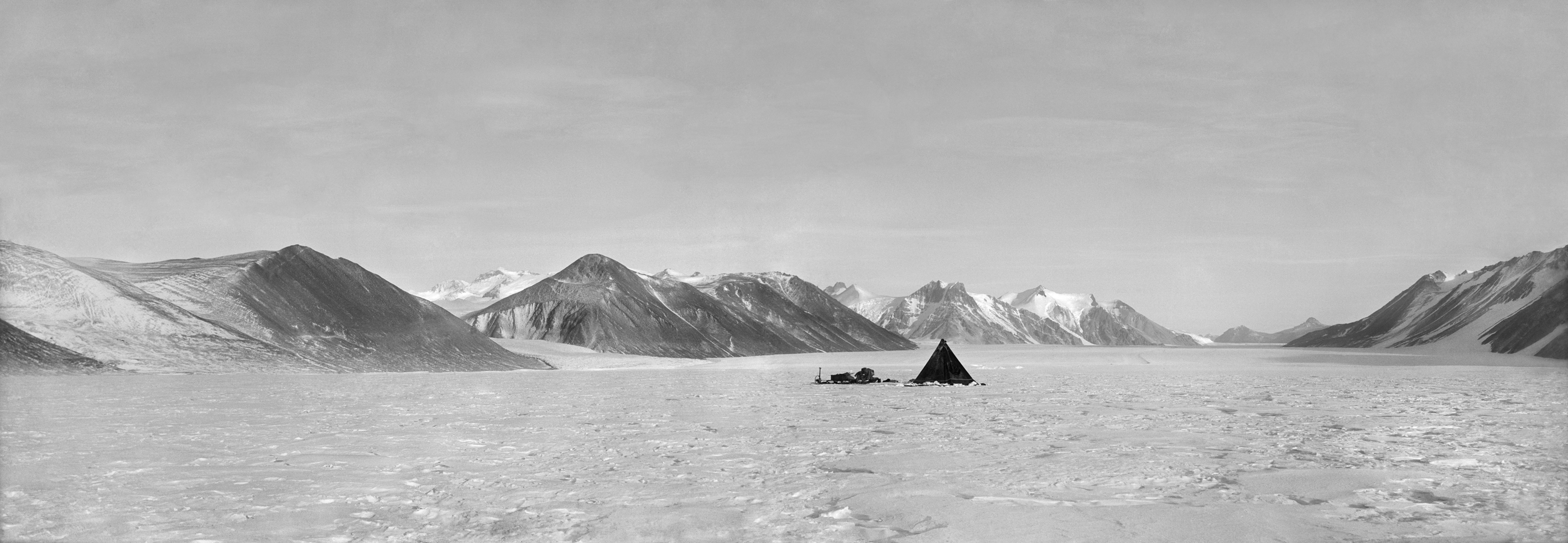
Camp on Ferrar Glacier c. 1912 by Robert Scott

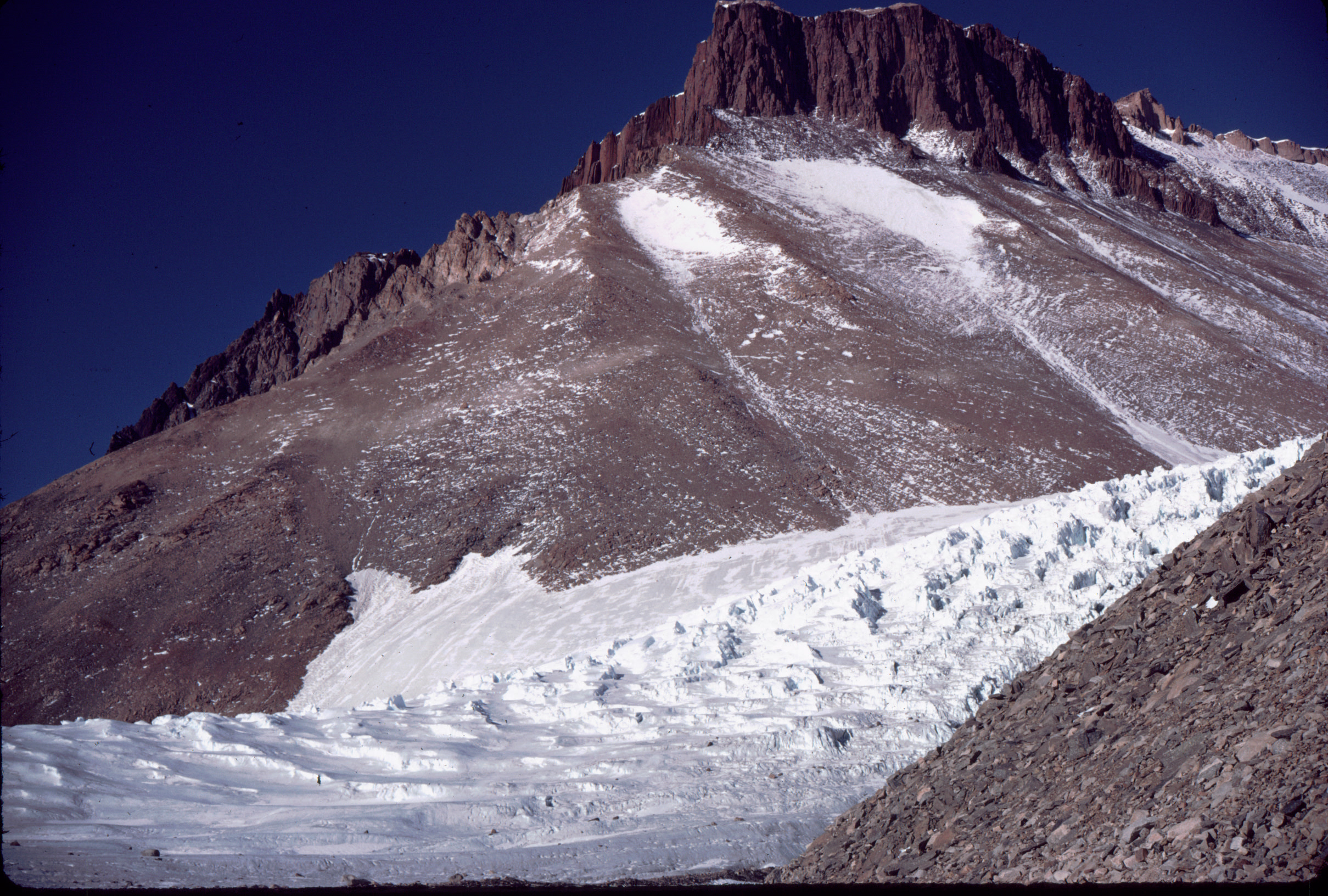
One of the feeders onto the Ferrar glacier

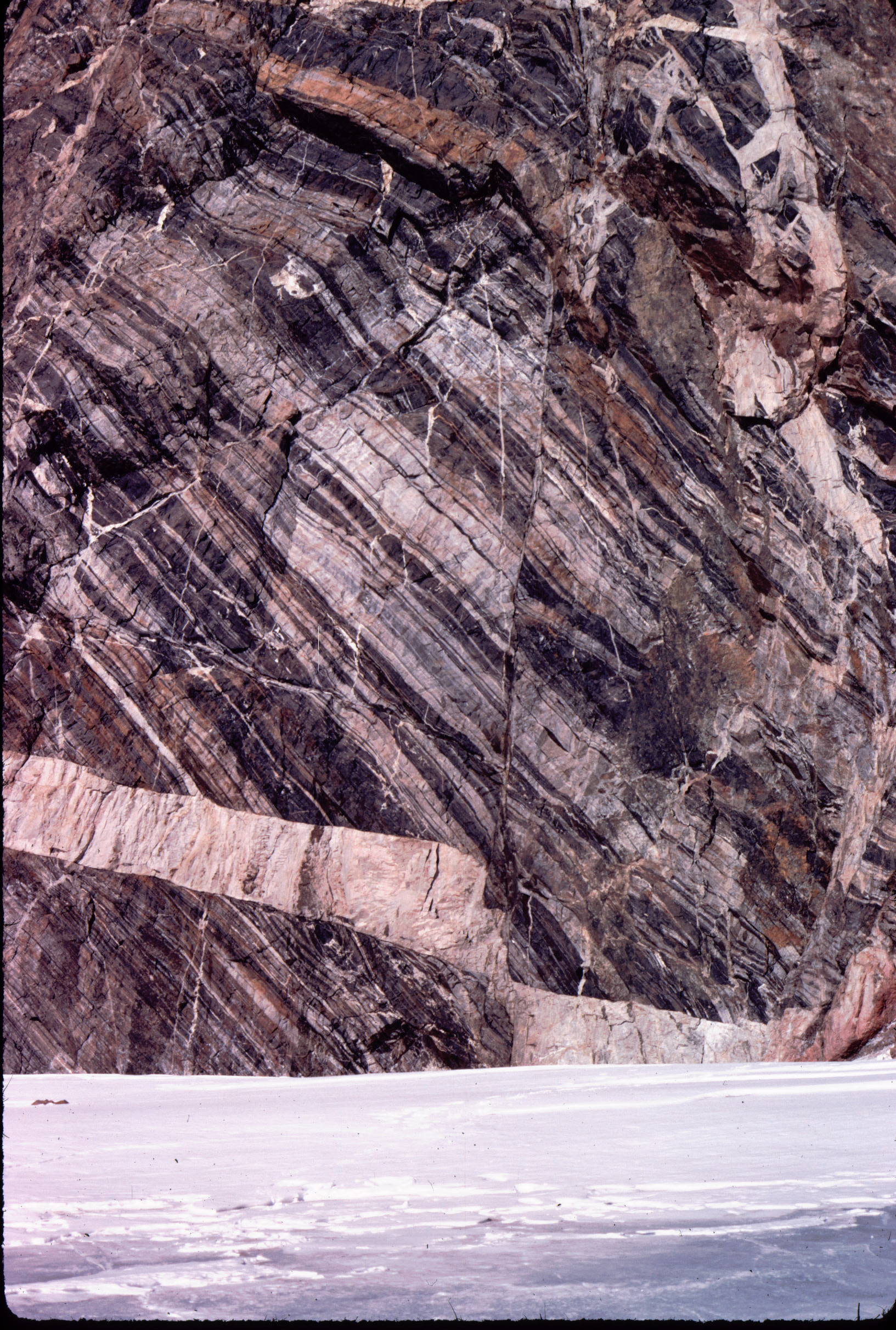
Ferrar Glacier South sidewall showing displacements

Tributaries from the right (south) include:

=== Palais Glacier ===
78°02′S 161°19′E. A broad glacier, about 8 nautical miles (15 km; 9.2 mi) long, flowing north between Wilkniss Mountains and Colwell Massif to enter Ferrar Glacier. Named by US-ACAN in 1994 after Julie Michelle Palais, glaciologist, who conducted field research in Antarctica during five seasons at Dome Charlie and Mount Erebus, 1978-89; from 1991, Program Director for Polar Glaciology, Office of Polar Programs, NSF; from 1994, member of the Advisory Committee on Antarctic Names, U.S. Board on Geographic Names.

=== Rotunda Glacier ===
78°00′S 161°38′E. A tributary glacier flowing north between Ugolini Peak and La Count Mountain into upper Ferrar Glacier. The name Rotunda Glacier was used for this feature in the report "Tephra in Glacier Ice" by J.R. Keys, P.W. Anderton, and P.R. Kyle following the 1973-74 and 1974-75 seasons. Named in association with the 2,410 metres (7,910 ft) butte of the same name on the west side of the glacier.

=== Blankenship Glacier ===
77°59′S 161°45′E. A steep glacier which descends north between La Count Mountain and Bubble Spur to enter upper Ferrar Glacier. Named by US-ACAN in 1992 after Donald D. Blankenship of the Geophysical and Polar Research Center, University of Wisconsin; geophysical researcher at Dome Charlie in East Antarctica for several seasons, 1978-82; researcher of Siple Coast ice streams in West Antarctica, 1983-88; at Byrd Polar Research Center, Ohio State University, from 1989.

=== Tedrow Glacier ===
77°58′S 161°50′E. Tributary Glacier which flows north into Ferrar Glacier along the west side of Table Mountain. Named by the US-ACAN for John C.F. Tedrow, USARP project leader for soil studies, who worked at McMurdo Station, 1961-62.

=== Emmanuel Glacier ===
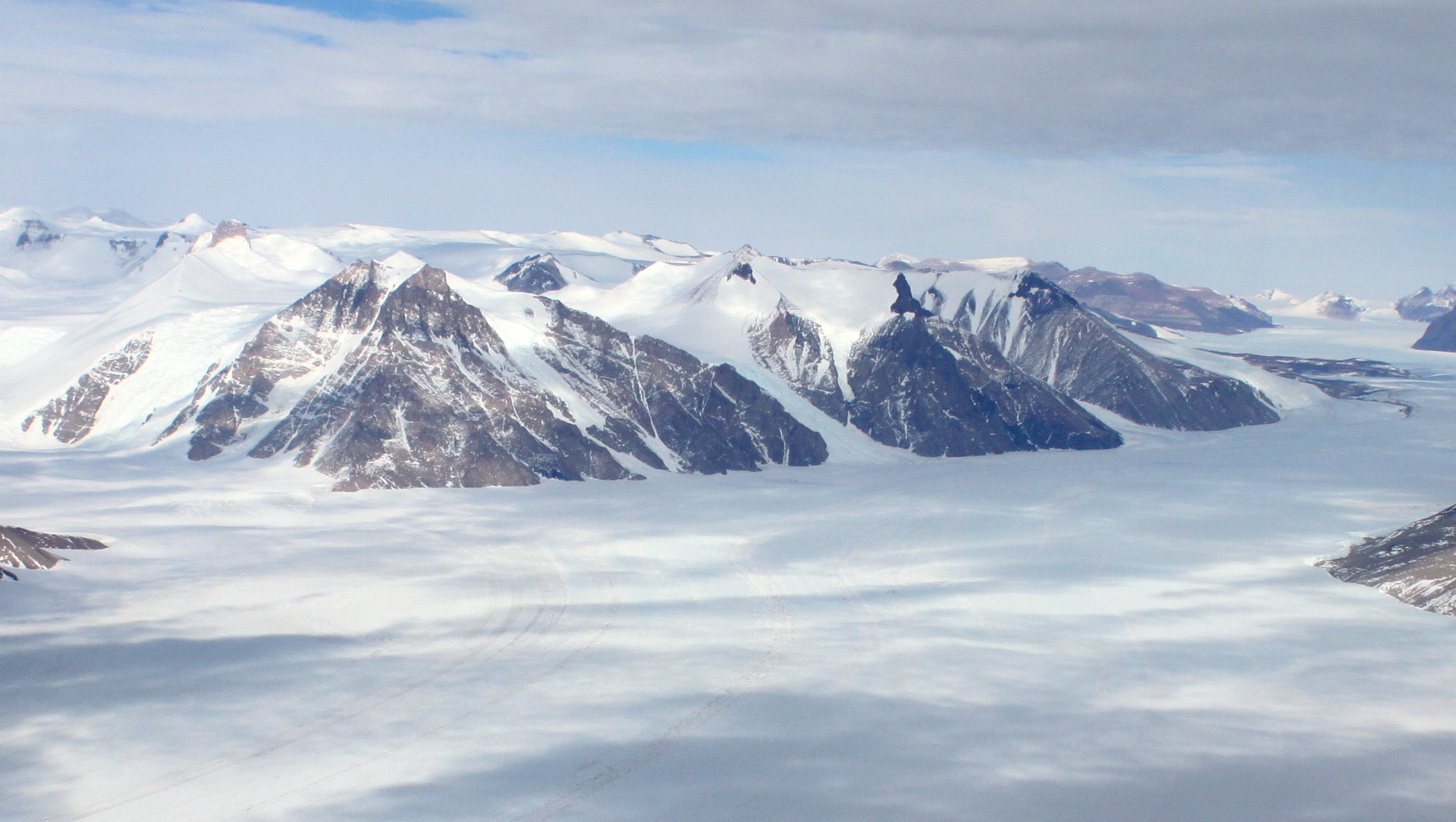
Cathedral Rocks

77°54′S 162°05′E. Glacier in the Royal Society Range, descending from Mount Lister northwestward between Table Mountain and Cathedral Rocks to enter Ferrar Glacier. Named by the BrAE (1910-13) after Emmanuel College, Cambridge, England.

=== Carleton Glacier ===
78°01′S 162°30′E. Glacier which drains the northwest slopes of Mount Lister and flows north into the Emmanuel Glacier. Mapped by USGS from ground surveys and Navy air photos. Named by US-ACAN in 1963 after Carleton College, Northfield, Minnesota, which has sent researchers to Antarctica, and in association with nearby Rutgers Glacier.

=== Bindschadler Glacier ===
77°58′S 162°09′E. A glacier in the northwest part of Royal Society Range, flowing north between Table Mountain and Platform Spur to join Emmanuel Glacier. Named by US-ACAN in 1992 after glaciologist Robert A. Bindschadler of the NASA Goddard Space Flight Center; from 1983 a principal investigator for USARP studies of the West Antarctic ice sheet including dynamics of ice streams in the Siple Coast area, their interaction with the Ross Ice Shelf, and the role of polar ice sheets in global climate change.

=== Zoller Glacier ===
77°53′S 162°18′E. Glacier in the Cathedral Rocks between Emmanuel and Darkowski Glaciers, flowing north into the Ferrar Glacier. Charted by the BrAE under Scott, 1910-13. Named by the US-ACAN in 1964 for Lieutenant John E. Zoller, United States Navy, chaplain with the winter party of 1957 at Little America V.

=== Darkowski Glacier ===
77°52′S 162°25′E. Glacier in the Cathedral Rocks, flowing north between Zoller and Bol Glaciers into the Ferrar Glacier of Victoria Land. Charted by the BrAE under Scott, 1910-13. Named by the US-ACAN in 1964 for Lieutenant Leon S. Darkowski, United States Navy, chaplain in 1957 at the Naval Air Facility on McMurdo Sound.

=== Bol Glacier ===
77°52′S 162°34′E. Glacier between Darkowski and Condit Glaciers, flowing north from the Cathedral Rocks into Ferrar Glacier. Named by the US-ACAN in 1964, for Lieutenant Commander Peter Bol, United States Navy, chaplain with the winter party of 1956 at the Naval Air Facility on McMurdo Sound.

=== Condit Glacier ===
77°52′S 162°48′E. Glacier at the E side of Cathedral Rocks, flowing north into the Ferrar Glacier. Charted by the BrAE under Scott, 1910-13. Named by the US-ACAN in 1964 for Lieutenant (j.g.) John C. Condit, United States Navy, chaplain with the winter party of 1956 at the Naval Air Facility on McMurdo Sound.

=== Descent Glacier ===
77°51′S 162°52′E. Short, steep glacier between Briggs Hill and Condit Glacier, flowing northwest from Descent Pass into Ferrar Glacier, in Victoria Land. So named because of the adventurous descent made here by the party led by Armitage of the BrNAE, 1901-04. The name seems to have been first used on maps of the BrAE, 1910-13.

=== Overflow Glacier ===
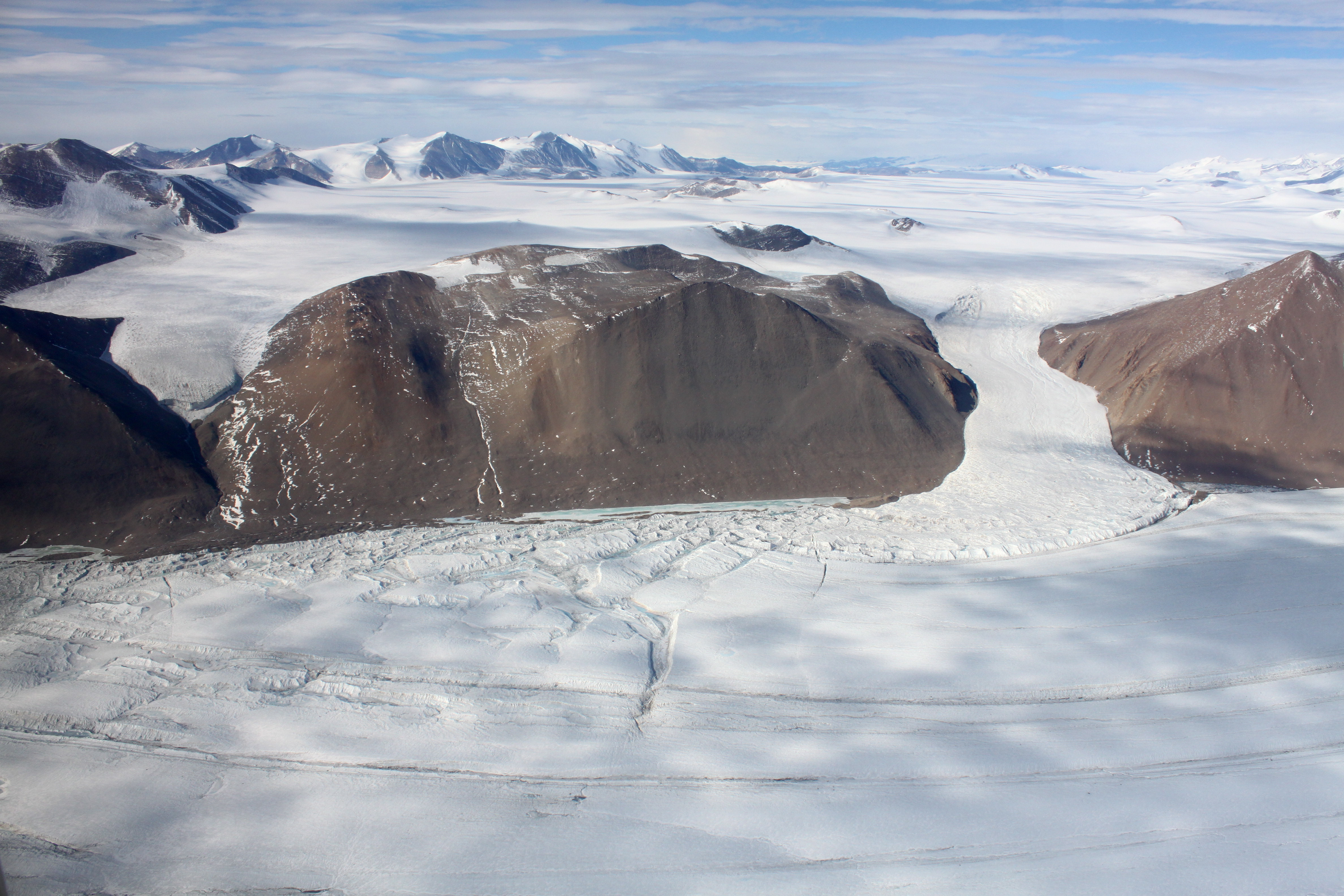
Overflow Glacier entering Ferrar Glacier

77°47′S 163°11′E. Steep tributary glacier spilling into Ferrar Glacier from the south, just east of Briggs Hill. Given this descriptive name by the Western Journey Party, led by Taylor, of the BrAE, 1910-13.

== Sources ==
- Alberts, Fred G., ed. (1995), Geographic Names of the Antarctic (PDF) (2 ed.), United States Board on Geographic Names This article incorporates public domain material from websites or documents of the United States Board on Geographic Names.
- Johnson, Jesse V.; Staiger, Jane W. (2007), Modeling Long-term Stability of the Ferrar Glacier, East Antarctica: Implications for Interpreting Cosmogenic Nuclide Inheritance, Computer Science Faculty Publications
- Taylor Glacier, USGS: United States Geological Survey
- Ross Island, USGS: United States Geological Survey
- This article incorporates public domain material from websites or documents of the United States Geological Survey.
