= Mount Terra Nova =

Mountain on Ross Island, Antarctica

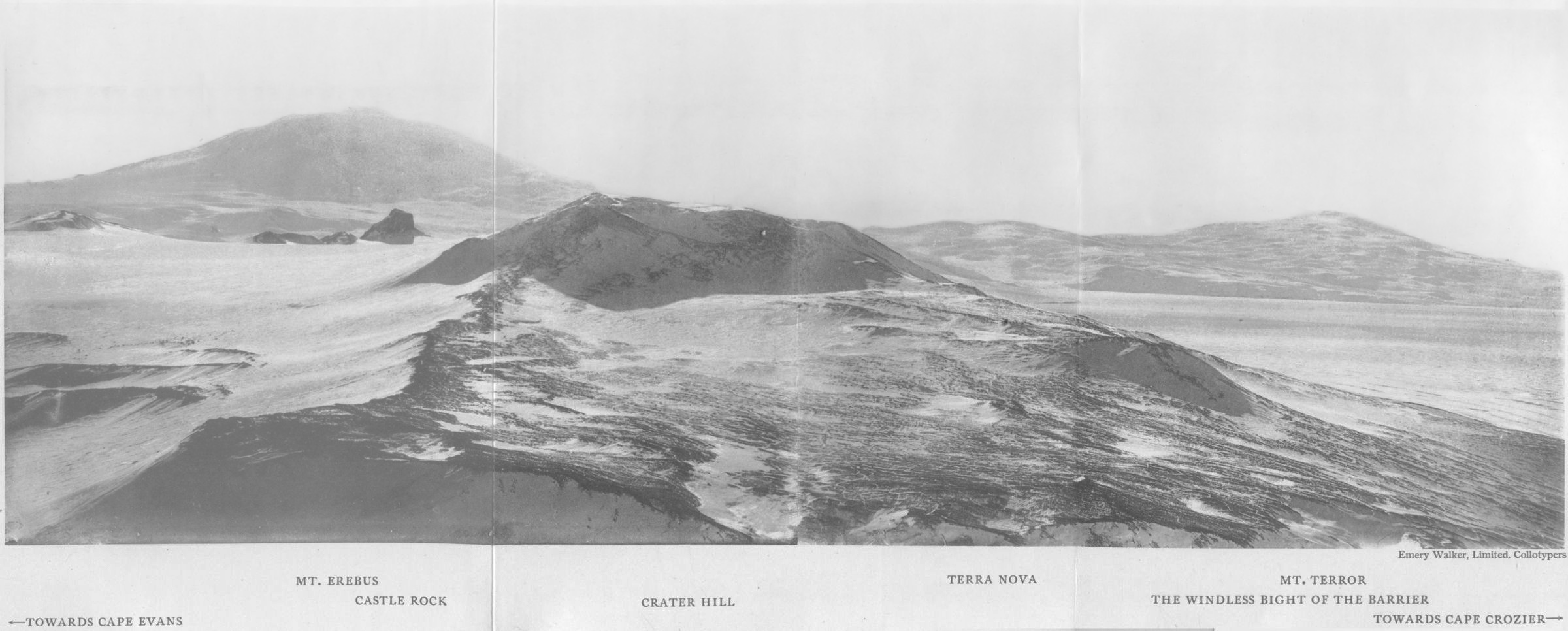
- c. 1922 panorama. Hut Point Peninsula (foreground), Mount Erebus (left), Mount Terra Nova (center) Mount Terror (right)

Highest point
- Elevation: 2,130 m (6,990 ft)
- Coordinates: 77°31′S 167°57′E

Geography
- Location within Antarctica
- Location: Ross Island, Antarctica

Geology
- Volcanic belt: McMurdo Volcanic Group

Mount Terra Nova is a snow-covered mountain, 2,130 metres (6,990 ft) high, between Mount Erebus and Mount Terror volcanoes on Ross Island in Antarctica. It was first mapped by the British National Antarctic Expedition (BrNAE) 1901–04, and named for the Terra Nova, relief ship for this expedition and the British Antarctic Expedition, 1910–13.

== Location ==
Mount Terra Nova lies between Mount Erebus to the west and Mount Terror to the east. It is south of Lewis Bay and north of Windless Bight. The Aurora Glacier and Terror Glacier drain its southern slopes.

== Geology ==
Mount Terra Nova is a dormant volcano. It is in the Erebus province of the McMurdo Volcanic Group. The blue-ice area at the summit has a diverse range of tephra. A 2014 study found seven layers: two phonolitic, one trachybasaltic, one trachytic, and two with a mixture of basanite, trachybasalt, phonolite, and trachyte glass shards. Immediately below the summit there are outcrops of basalt, olivine basalt, and scoria. Most of the outcrops are covered in basalt, trachyte, and scoria glacial rubble. Lower down on the mountain there are some partially dissected vents and some flows of olivine basalt, basalt, scoria, and pyroclastics.

== Seismic activity ==
Between 1983 and 1984 a network of ten stations on Ross Island recorded 157 small earthquakes. An analysis of epicenters showed a linear pattern cutting across and beyond the island. Most of this activity was below Mount Terra Nova. The depths were from 0 to 25 kilometres (0 to 16 mi), with an average depth of 8.2 kilometres (5.1 mi).

== Sources ==
- Alberts, Fred G., ed. (1995), Geographic Names of the Antarctic (PDF) (2 ed.), United States Board on Geographic Names This article incorporates public domain material from websites or documents of the United States Board on Geographic Names.
- "Caldwell Peak", Geographic Names Information System, United States Geological Survey, United States Department of the Interior
- Hund, Andrew J. (2014), Antarctica and the Arctic Circle: A Geographic Encyclopedia of the Earth's Polar Regions, Bloomsbury Publishing USA, ISBN 978-1-61069-393-6
- Iverson, Nels A.; Kyle, Philip R.; Dunbar, Nelia W.; McIntosh, William C.; Pearce, Nicholas J. G. (2014), "Eruptive history and magmatic stability of Erebus volcano, Antarctica: Insights from englacial tephra", Geochemistry, Geophysics, Geosystems, 15 (11): 4180–4202, doi:10.1002/2014GC005435
- "Oamaru Peak", Geographic Names Information System, United States Geological Survey, United States Department of the Interior
- Ross Island, USGS: United States Geological Survey
- Rowe, C.A.; Kienle, J. (December 1986), "Seismicity in the vicinity of Ross Island, Antarctica", Journal of Geodynamics, 6 (1–4): 375–385, doi:10.1016/0264-3707(86)90050-5
- "Terror Saddle", Geographic Names Information System, United States Geological Survey, United States Department of the Interior
- Treves, Samuel B. (1970), Volcanic Rocks of the Ross Island Area (PDF)

This article incorporates public domain material from websites or documents of the United States Geological Survey.
