= Windless Bight =

Bight in Antarctica

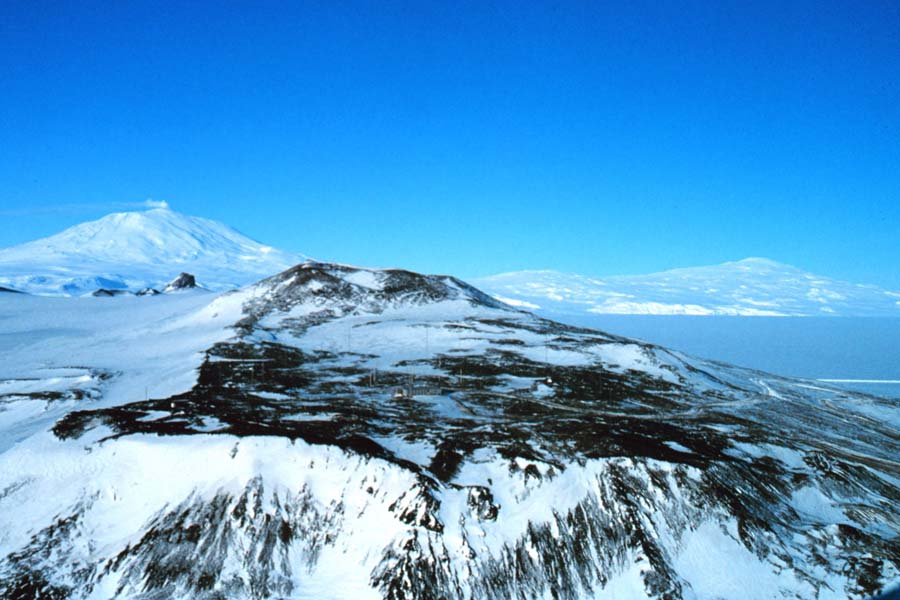
- Windless Bight (center right) between Hut Point Peninsula (foreground), Mount Erebus (left), Mount Terra Nova (center) and Mount Terror (right)

- Location within Antarctica
- Location: Ross Island, Antarctica
- Coordinates: 77°42′S 167°40′E
- Basin countries: Antarctica

Windless Bight (77°42′S 167°40′E) is a prominent bight that indents the south side of Ross Island, Antarctica, eastward of Hut Point Peninsula. It was named by the Winter Journey Party, led by Wilson, of the British Antarctic Expedition, 1910–13, which encountered no wind in this area. The bight is permanently frozen. It is the site of a station that monitors infrasound to detect violations of the Comprehensive Nuclear-Test-Ban Treaty.

== Location ==
The Ross Ice Shelf covers over 487,000 square kilometres (188,000 sq mi). Windless Bight is a large ice plain that covers hundreds of square kilometers of the northwest edge of the Ross Ice Shelf. It is flat and featureless, and has hardly any surface winds, as its name implies. Ross Island as a whole experiences strongly southerly winds, but Windless Bight is unusually calm. The bight extends from Castle Rock on the Hut Point Peninsula east to Terror Point. Mount Erebus is to the northwest, Mount Terra Nova to the north and Mount Terror to the northeast. Cape Crozier is east of the bight.

== Infrasonic array ==
The Preparatory Commission for the Comprehensive Nuclear-Test-Ban Treaty Organization (CTBTO) has its IS55 infrasonic array on Windless Bight about 26 kilometres (16 mi) northeast of McMurdo Station. The lack of surface winds reduces background noise that might interfere with infrasound measurement. This was confirmed by an infrasonic microphone array that was established in 1976 by the Geophysical Institute of the University of Alaska Fairbanks, sponsored by the National Science Foundation (NSF).

The University of Alaska Fairbanks, under contract to the CTBTO, prepared the site for the IS55 infrasonic array and installed the equipment, which was completed in February 2001. After testing, IS55 was certified as an International Monitoring System (IMS) station under the Comprehensive Nuclear-Test-Ban Treaty on 22 August 2003.

IS55 is an array of eight microbarometer sensors and space filters arranged that is divided into two sub-arrays, plus a high performance weather station at one of the arrays. Every second data on temperature, wind speed and wind direction is transmitted to a Central Recording Facility (CRF). Infrasonic data from each element of the array, along with the weather information, is formatted at the CRF into 30-second packages, which are sent by satellite link from McMurdo Station to Brewster, Washington, Denver, Colorado and Vienna, Austria.

A field camp for support personnel is used for several weeks each year. The team has standard remote field equipment such as snowmobiles, and stays in two Polarhavens and six individual mountain tents. During periods of use, one or two team members may return to McMurdo Station to collect supplies, and to stay overnight.

== Features ==
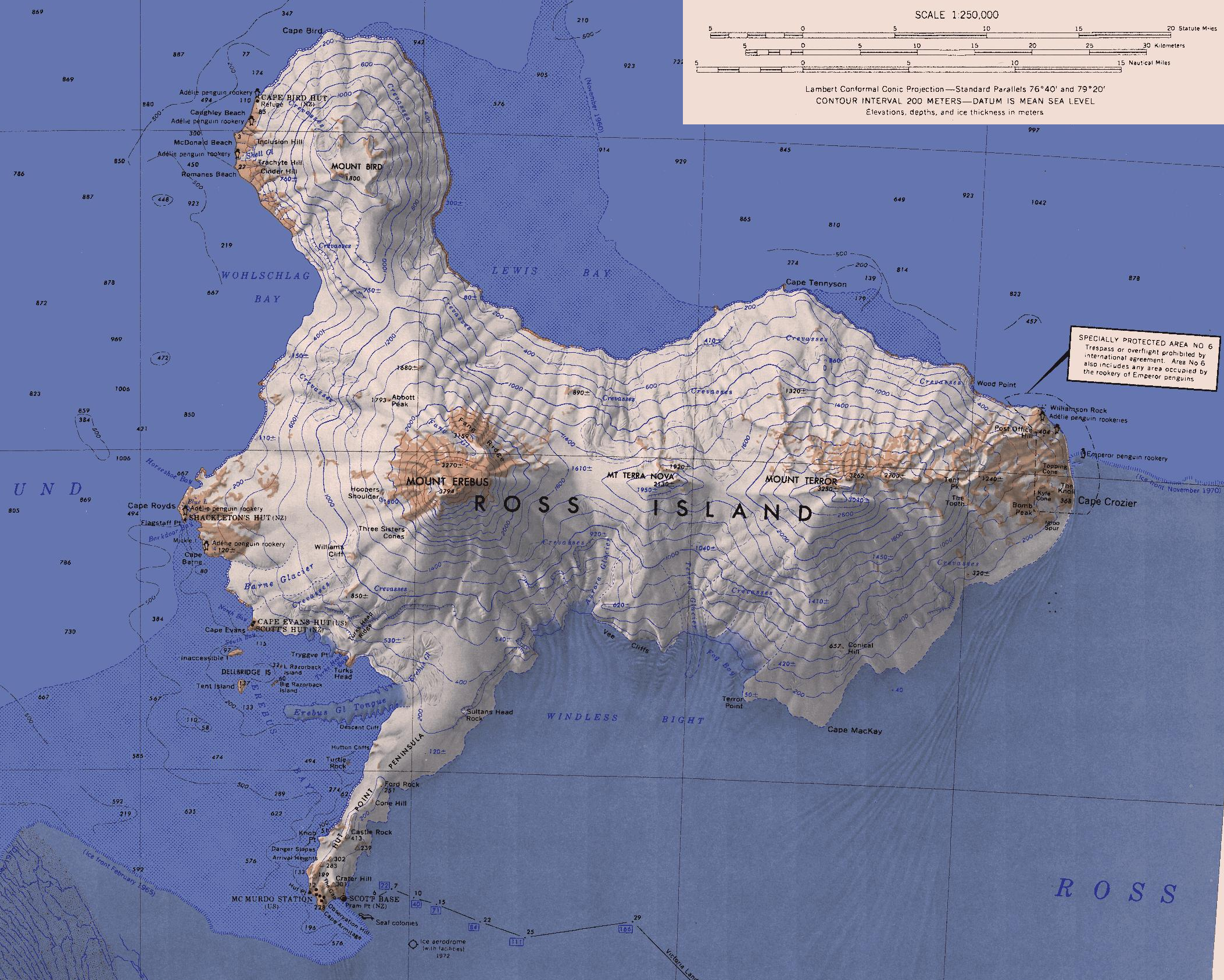
Ross Island. Windless Bight in south center of map

Named features of the bight include, from west to east, Sultans Head Rock, Aurora Glacier, Vee Cliffs, Terror Glacier, Fog Bay and Terror Point. Cape MacKay is east of Terror Point.

=== Sultans Head Rock ===
77°43′S 167°12′E. A rock spur along the east flank of Hut Point Peninsula, 7.5 nautical miles (13.9 km; 8.6 mi) southwest of the Vee Cliffs, on the south side of Ross Island. The name was first used by the British National Antarctic Expedition (BrNAE) under Scott, 1901-04, in describing rocks collected there by Thomas V. Hodgson of the expedition.

=== Tyree Head ===
77.652933°S 167.461641°E A headland 3.2 nautical miles (5.9 km; 3.7 mi) northeast of Sultans Head Rock on the south side of Ross Island. The headland rises to over 400 metres (1,300 ft) and is ice covered except for rock exposed on the lower east side. Named after Admiral David M. Tyree, United States Navy (d. 1984), Commander, U.S. Naval Support Force, Antarctica, 1959-62.

=== Dufek Head ===
77.61462°S 167.70785°E. An ice-covered headland 4.4 nautical miles (8.1 km; 5.1 mi) northeast of Tyree Head. The headland rises to 620 metres (2,030 ft) high at the east side of the terminus of Aurora Glacier. Named by Advisory Committee on Antarctic Names (US-ACAN) (2000) in association with Tyree Head, q.v., after Rear Admiral George J. Dufek, United States Navy (United States Navy) (1903-77), Commander, United States Naval Support Force, Antarctica, 1954-59.

=== Aurora Glacier ===
77°37′S 167°38′E. A large glacier draining that part of Ross Island between Mount Erebus and Mount Terra Nova, and flowing south into McMurdo Ice Shelf. Named by A.J. Heine in 1963 after the Aurora, the ship of the Ross Sea Party of the British expedition under Ernest Shackleton, 1914-17.

=== Vee Cliffs ===
77°38′S 167°45′E. Steep, mainly ice-covered cliffs, 4 nautical miles (7.4 km; 4.6 mi) long, between Aurora Glacier and Terror Glacier on the south shore of Ross Island. The name is suggested by two prominent V-shape wedges which protrude from the cliff wall. The name was first used by Doctor Edward A. Wilson who, with Thomas V. Hodgson of BrNAE, 1901–04, visited the cliffs in November 1903.

=== Eastwind Glacier ===
77.6166667°S 168.2666667°E. A glacier that drains part of the south slopes of Mount Terror in southeast Ross Island. It flows southwest and coalesces with the east margin of Terror Glacier where the two glaciers enter Fog Bay. In association with the names of expedition ships grouped on this island, named after U.S. Coast Guard Cutter (USCGC) Eastwind. An icebreaker, "she" made nine Antarctic deployments in support of science activities from U.S. Navy (USN) Operation Deep Freeze, 1955–56, through the 1966–67 season.

=== Terror Glacier ===
77°37′S 168°03′E. A large glacier between Mount Terra Nova and Mount Terror on Ross Island, flowing south into Windless Bight. So named by A.J. Heine of the New Zealand Geological Survey Antarctic Expedition (NZGSAE), 1962–63, because of its association with Mount Terror.

=== Fog Bay ===
77°40′S 168°10′E. A small bay immediately west-northwest of Terror Point in Windless Bight, on the south side of Ross Island. So named by the Winter Journey Party, led by Wilson of the British Antarctic Expedition (BrAE), 1910-13, in July 1911 because of the thick white fog they encountered in this locality.

=== Terror Point ===
77°41′S 168°13′E. A point below Mount Terror. It marks the east limit of Fog Bay, 4 nautical miles (7.4 km; 4.6 mi) west-northwest of Cape MacKay. The name was first used by members of the BrNAE, 1901–04, and was apparently applied in association with Mount Terror which overlooks this point from northeastward.

=== Cape MacKay ===
77°42′S 168°31′E. An ice-covered cape which forms the southeast extremity of Ross Island. Discovered by the BrNAE (1901–04) and named for Captain Harry MacKay, commander of the Terra Nova, one of the relief ships for the expedition.

== Sources ==
- Alberts, Fred G., ed. (1995), Geographic Names of the Antarctic (PDF) (2 ed.), United States Board on Geographic Names This article incorporates public domain material from websites or documents of the United States Board on Geographic Names.
- "Dufek Head", Geographic Names Information System, United States Geological Survey, United States Department of the Interior
- "Eastwind Glacier", Geographic Names Information System, United States Geological Survey, United States Department of the Interior
- IS55, Windless Bight, Antarctica, United States, CTBTO: Preparatory Commission for the Comprehensive Nuclear-Test-Ban Treaty Organization
- O'Connor, W.P.; Bromwich, D.H. (1988), "Surface airflow around Windless Bight, Ross Island, Antarctica", Q. J. R. Meteorol. Soc., 114 (482): 917–938, Bibcode:1988QJRMS.114..917O, doi:10.1002/qj.49711448205
- Ross Island Map, USGS: United States Geological Survey, 1972
- "Tyree Head", Geographic Names Information System, United States Geological Survey, United States Department of the Interior
- Varetto, Gianni (26 April 2019), "Windless Bight Field Camp (WAP USA-NEW)", WAP
- Windless Bight, Antarctica New Zealand

This article incorporates public domain material from websites or documents of the United States Geological Survey.
