= Erebus hotspot =

Arctic Velocity

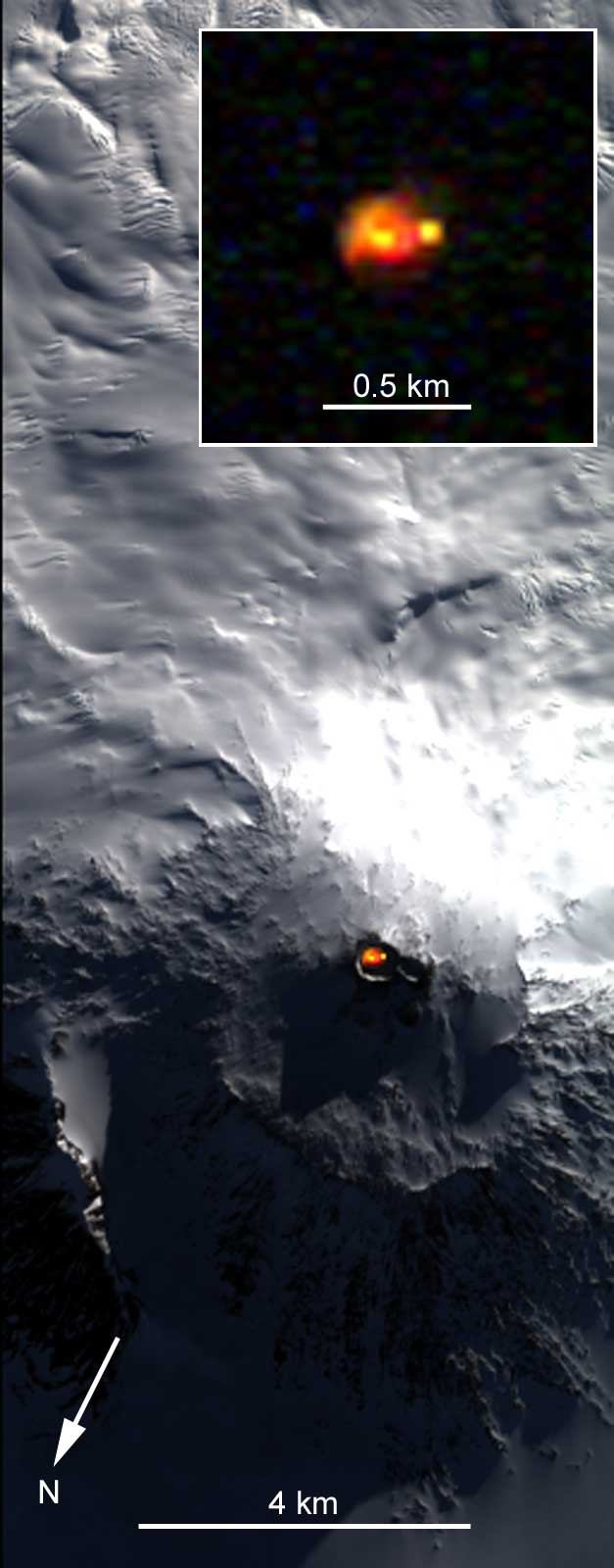
satellite image

The Erebus hotspot is a hypothesized volcanic hotspot responsible for the high volcanic activity on Ross Island in the western Ross Sea of Antarctica. Its current eruptive zone, Mount Erebus, has erupted continuously since its discovery in 1841. Magmas of the Erebus hotspot are similar to those erupted from hotspots at the active East African Rift in eastern Africa. Mount Bird at the northernmost end of Ross Island and Mount Terror at its eastern end are large basaltic shield volcanoes that have been potassium-argon dated 3.8–4.8 and 0.8–1.8 million years old.

== About ==
There is currently disagreement over the cause of volcanic activity on Ross Island. The traditional view is that the area is underlain by a mantle plume which has given rise to volcanism and, in conjunction with a second plume thought to be under Marie Byrd Land on the mainland to the east, a system of rifts known as the West Antarctic Rift System. Support for a plume origin includes petrological, geochemical, and isotopic evidence for a deep-mantle source, high heat flow in the area, high volcanic output, domal uplift, and seismic anomalies in the upper mantle consistent with a plume approximately 250 to 300 km (160 to 190 mi) in diameter extending 200 km (120 mi) below the surface where it changes into a narrow column that extends at least a further 400 km (250 mi) and according to some studies as deep as 1,000 km (620 mi). The area lacks the time-progressive volcanism typically associated with mantle plumes. This has been explained by the Antarctic Plate being stationary since the Late Cretaceous.

Other observations appear to be inconsistent with the plume model. Uplift in the region lacks the circular symmetry typically associated with mantle plumes. Rifting occurred mainly in the Late Cretaceous, whereas uplift occurred mainly in the middle Eocene, so uplift followed extension rather than preceding it as would be expected with a mantle plume. The volume of magmatism, when the long duration of volcanic activity is taken into account, appears lower than would be expected to result from a mantle plume. Seismic imaging does not show the circular symmetry expected for a mantle plume but indicates rather a linear, tectonic feature extending from Tasmania to the Ross Sea.

Owing to these issues, some scientists have questioned the plume model and propose instead a shallow, tectonic mechanism. In this view, lithospheric extension and rifting during the Late Cretaceous stretched the lithosphere, giving rise to partial melts. Though insufficient to break the surface, fertile, low-liquidus material was distributed throughout the lithospheric mantle. During the middle Eocene, tectonic changes in the Southern Ocean gave rise to further lithospheric deformation, causing strike-slip faulting which enabled decompression melting and extrusion of the fertile material emplaced during the Late Cretaceous.
