= Ross Island =

Island in Ross Sea, Antarctica

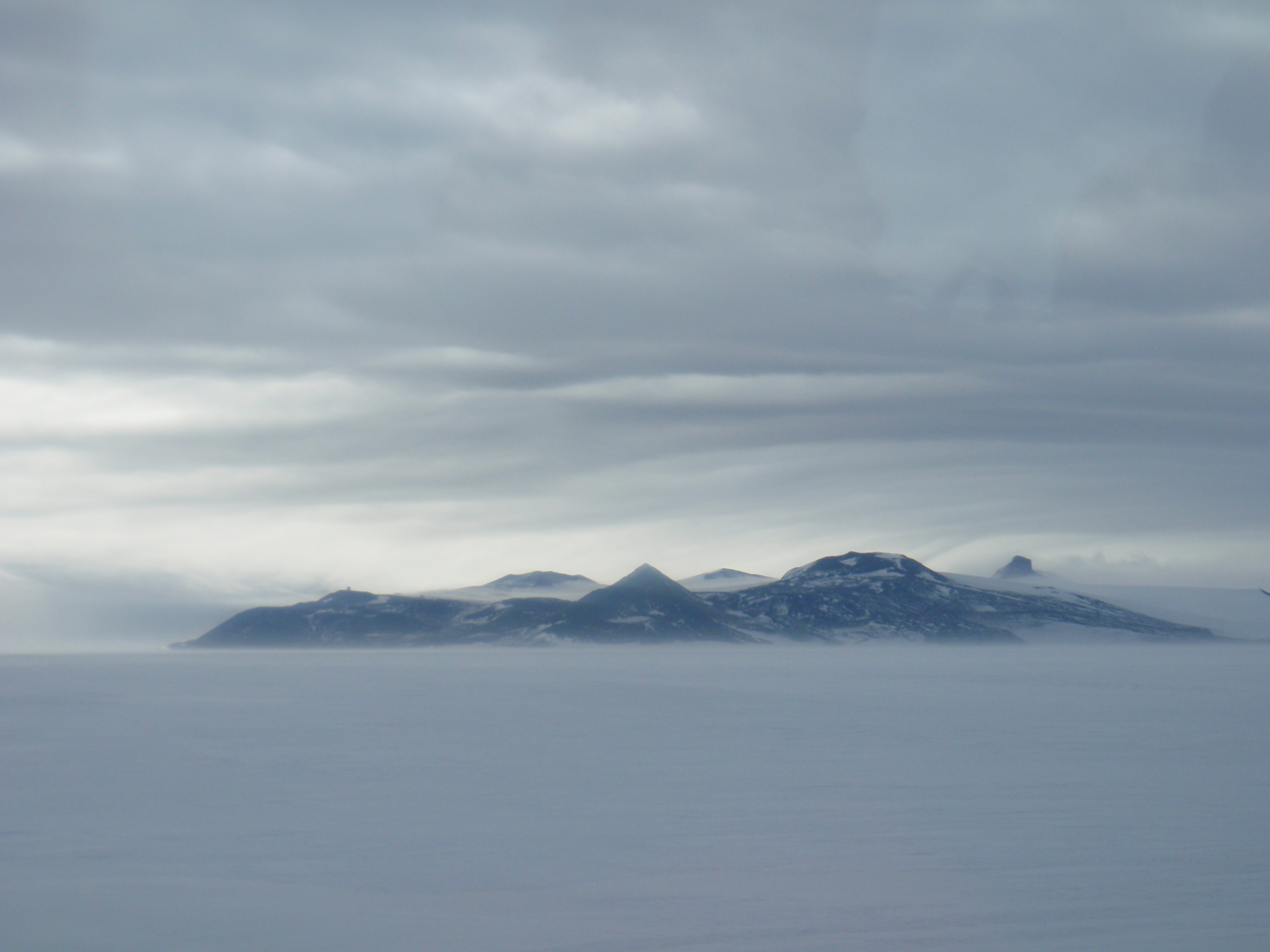
- South end of Ross Island, with the pyramidal Observation Hill at the center of the image, between McMurdo Station and Scott Base. Crater Hill is visible to the right.

- Location within Antarctica

Geography
- Location: Antarctica
- Coordinates: 77°30′S 168°00′E
- Archipelago: Ross Archipelago
- Area: 2,460 km^{2} (950 sq mi)
- Highest elevation: 3,794 m (12448 ft)
- Highest point: Mount Erebus

Administration
- Administered under the Antarctic Treaty System

Demographics
- Population: 1300 (non-permanent)

Ross Island is an island in Antarctica lying on the east side of McMurdo Sound and extending 43 nautical miles (80 km; 49 mi) from Cape Bird in the north to Cape Armitage in the south, and a similar distance from Cape Royds in the west to Cape Crozier in the east. The island is entirely volcanic. Mount Erebus, 3,795 metres (12,451 ft), near the center, is an active volcano. Mount Terror, 3,230 metres (10,600 ft) about 20 nautical miles (37 km; 23 mi) eastward, is an extinct volcano. Mount Bird rises to 1,765 metres (5,791 ft) just south of Cape Bird.

Ross Island lies within the boundary of Ross Dependency, an area of Antarctica claimed by New Zealand. However, the claim is currently in abeyance by the International Antarctic Treaty System of 1961. Signatories of this treaty essentially agree that Antarctica is used for peaceful and scientific purposes. The United States and New Zealand each established bases, McMurdo and Scott, in the mid 1950s on Ross Island; the former is now the largest human settlement in Antarctica since its founding. The island is also home to early exploration shacks and memorials including Shackleton's Hut at Cape Royds, Scott's Hut at Cape Evans, and Discovery Hut at Hut Point.

Ross Island, although an island surrounded by water, is essentially permanently connected to the main Antarctica land mass by a glacial ice sheet on its south and eastern side: it is only the sea ice in McMurdo sound that melts and re-freezes each year. The South Pole Traverse goes from Ross Island across the ice sheet to the South Pole, and that road is opened seasonally to clear snow and check for new crevasses in the 21st century. At the edge of the Antarctic glacial ice sheet and McMurdo sound, is an ice cliff. The southern tip of Ross Island, Hut Point, has a harbor that is the southernmost harbor in the world, and is opened each year by icebreakers during the light season at the end of the year to bring supplies. From these bases resources flow to science projects and Antarctic bases and field stations not just on Ross island but many places throughout Antarctica. There are also several airports and airstrips around Ross Island, some of which are only open seasonally.

== History ==
=== Discovery ===
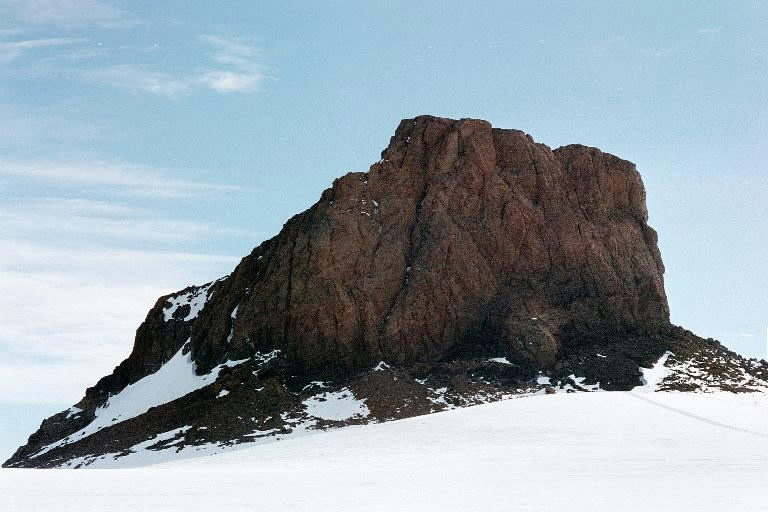
Ross Island's Castle Rock was discovered and named by the Robert Falcon Scott British Antarctica Expedition of 1901-1904

This area was discovered by Sir James Clark Ross in 1841, but he thought it formed part of the mainland of Victoria Land. It was determined to be an island and named Ross Island by the British National Antarctic Expedition (1901-04), led by Robert Falcon Scott, in honor of Sir James Clark Ross. Ross Island was the base for many of the early expeditions to Antarctica. It is the southernmost island reachable by sea. Huts built by Scott's and Shackleton's expeditions are still standing on the island, preserved as historical sites.

Today Ross Island is home to New Zealand's Scott Base and to the largest Antarctic settlement, the United States Antarctic Program's McMurdo Station. Greenpeace established World Park Base on the island and ran it for five years, from 1987 to 1992.

== Geography ==
Because of the persistent presence of the ice sheet, the island is sometimes taken to be part of the Antarctic mainland. Only a small portion of the island is free of ice and snow. Its area is 2,460 square kilometres (950 mi^{2}). Despite its relatively small size, Ross Island is the world's 6th highest island and the highest island in Antarctica. It has the highest average elevation of any island.

Major volcanic peaks include, from west to east, Mount Bird, Mount Erebus, Mount Terra Nova and Mount Terror. Mount Erebus is (3,794 metres (12,448 ft)) is the planet's southernmost active volcano. The extinct volcano Mount Terror (3,230 metres (10,600 ft)), is the second highest on the island. They were named by Captain James Ross after his ships HMS Erebus and HMS Terror. The third highest elevation is Mount Bird, with Shell Glacier and Endeavour Piedmont Glacier on its slopes.

The Erebus hotspot is thought to be responsible for the island's volcanic activity.

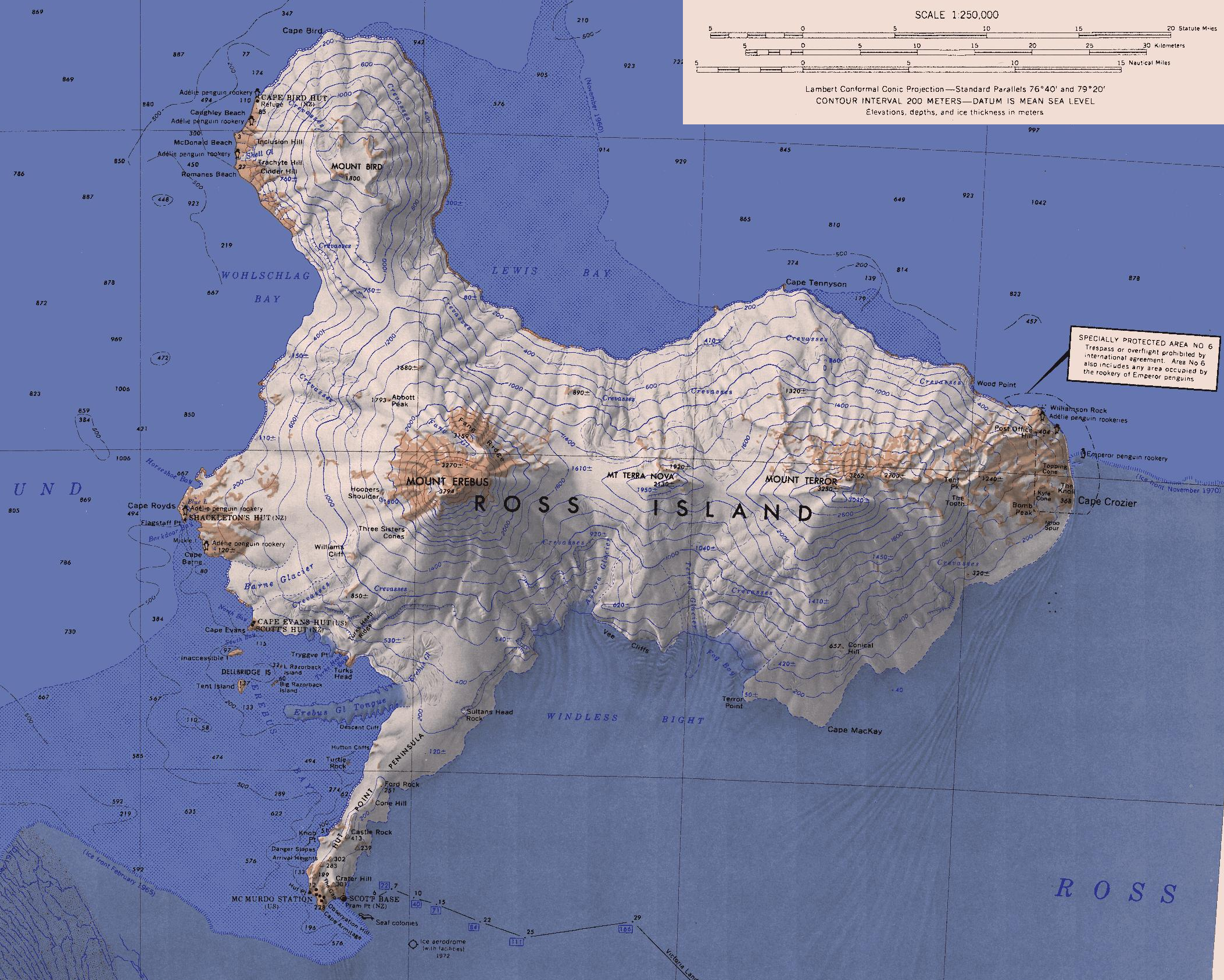
Map of Ross Island

== Stations and huts ==
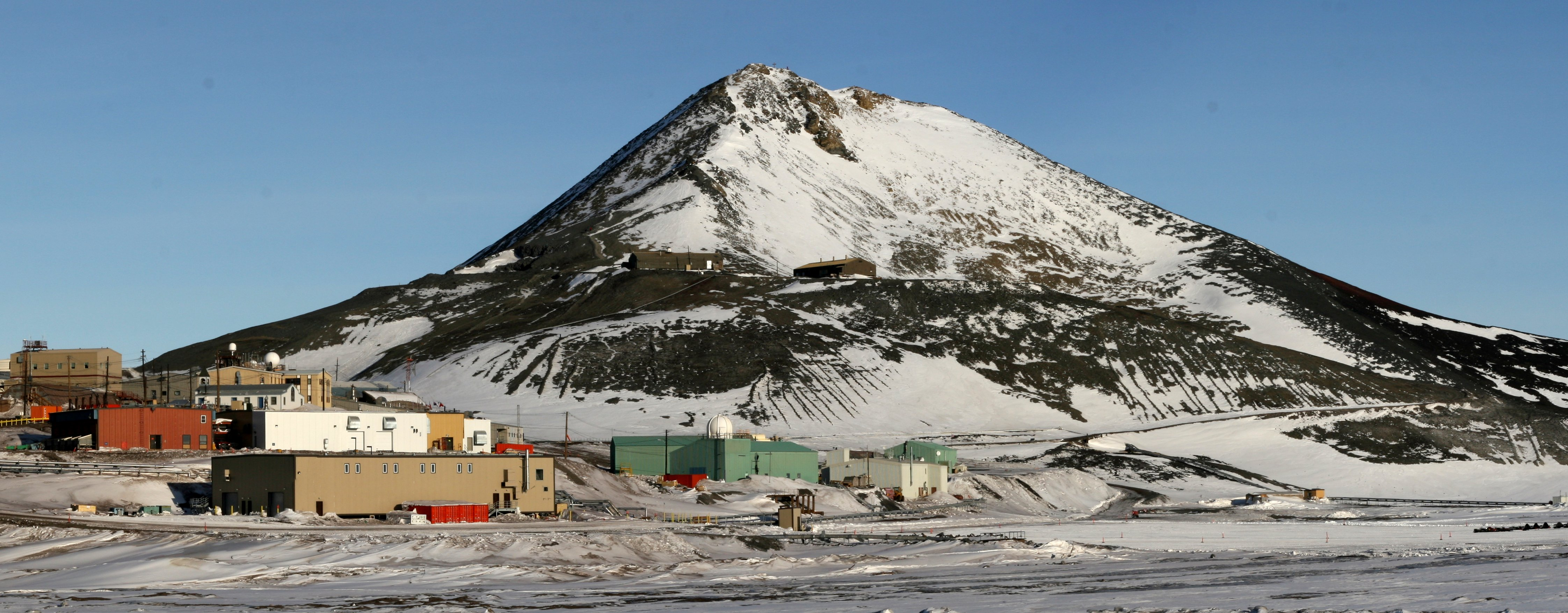
Observation hill overlooks McMurdo Station

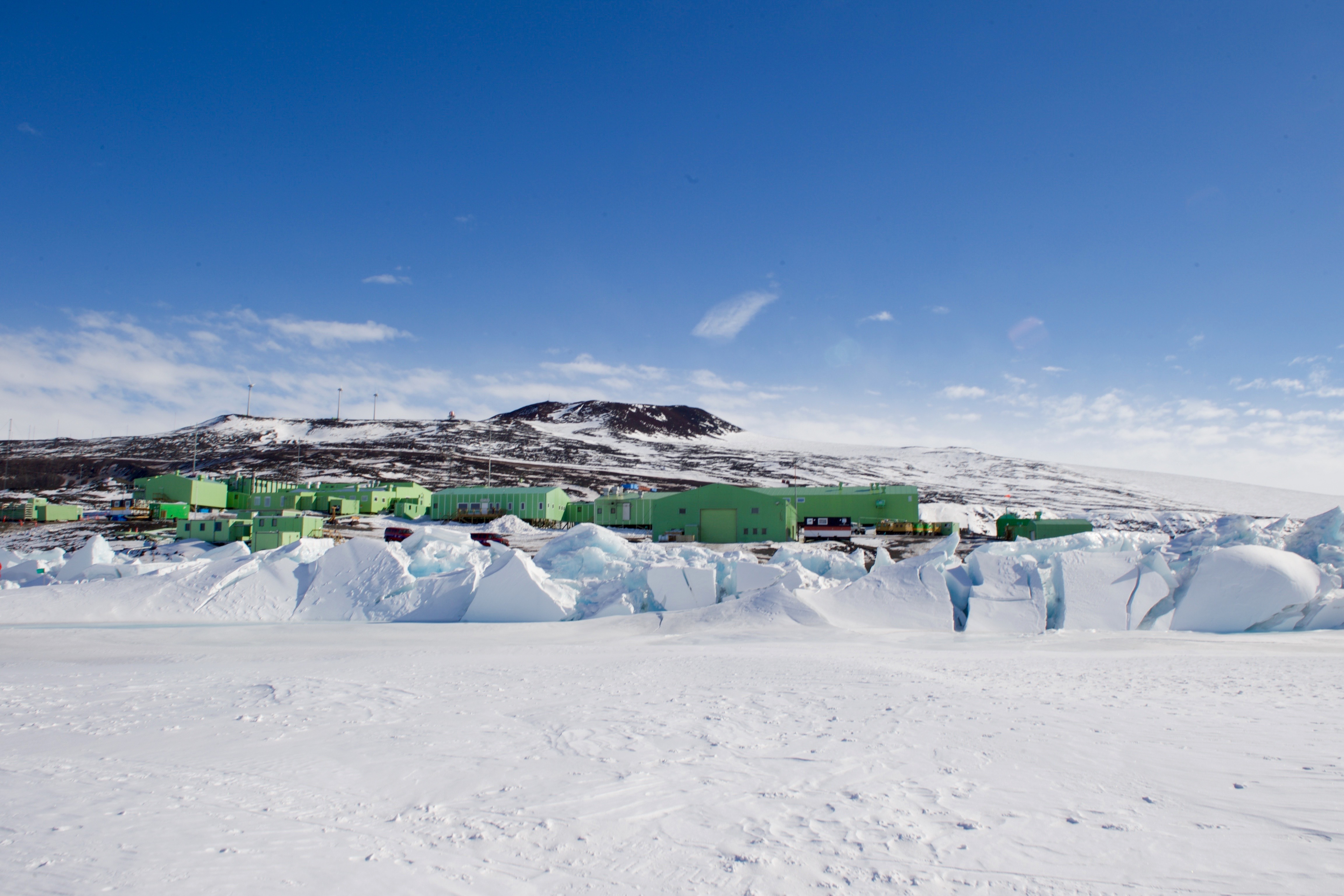
Scott Base

The base of the Hut Point Peninsula is home to McMurdo Station, Scott Base and Discovery Hut. Scott's Hut is further north on the west coast, at Cape Evans. North of this at Cape Royds is Shackleton's Hut. Finally, the Cape Bird Hut is just south of Cape Bird.

- McMurdo Station, established in 1955, is the largest station in Antarctica. It provides logistic support to the United States Antarctic Program. It has a harbor, landing strips, about 85 buildings including large three story structures, a power plant, warehouses and other infrastructure.
- Scott Base was established on Pram Point by New Zealand in 1957 as a permanent base supporting scientific researchers who visit Antarctica in the summer. The area under roof is about 4,000 square metres (43,000 sq ft).
- Discovery Hut was built on Hut Point during the British National Antarctic Expedition 1901-1904 (Discovery Expedition). It was the first hut to be built on the island.
- Scott’s Hut at Cape Evans was the base for Robert Falcon Scott’s British Antarctic (Terra Nova) Expedition 1910–1913. It was built in January 1911 on a beach of volcanic scoria on the north-west side of Cape Evans. The Antarctic Heritage Trust has restored the hut and now maintains it.
- Shackleton's Hut at Cape Royds is a prefabricated timber hut built in London in 1907 for Ernest Shackleton’s British Antarctic (Nimrod) Expedition 1907–1909. It was disassembled, then rebuilt on site, and used by the expedition for 14 months.
- Cape Bird Hut was a six-person shelter built at New Zealand's Scott Base in 1966 and taken by helicopter to Cape Bird. It was rebuilt in 1991, can house eight people, and has a kitchen with a propane stove and diesel-powered central heating.

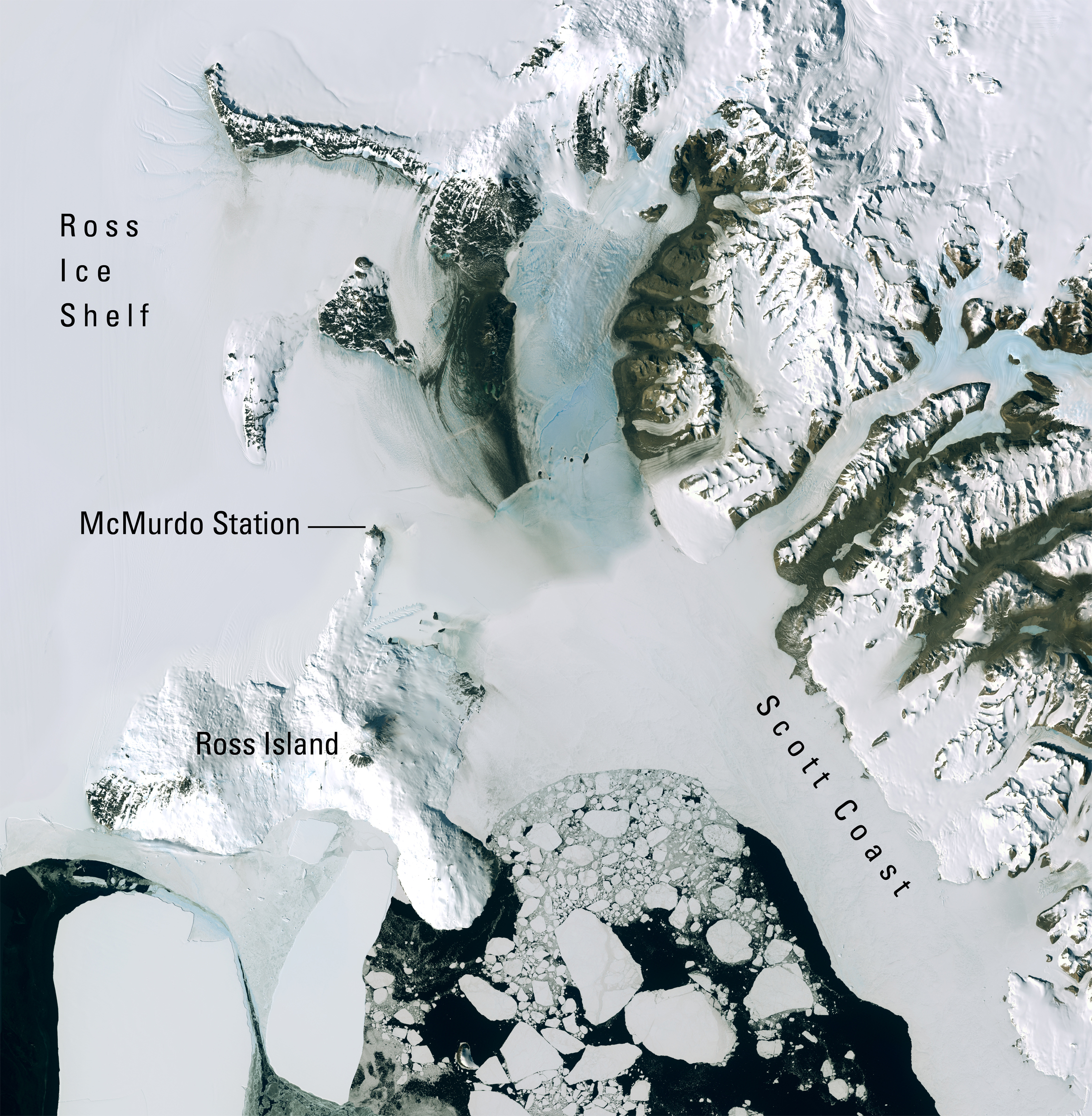
Ross Island and McMurdo Sound. (south is up)

== Capes and peninsulas ==
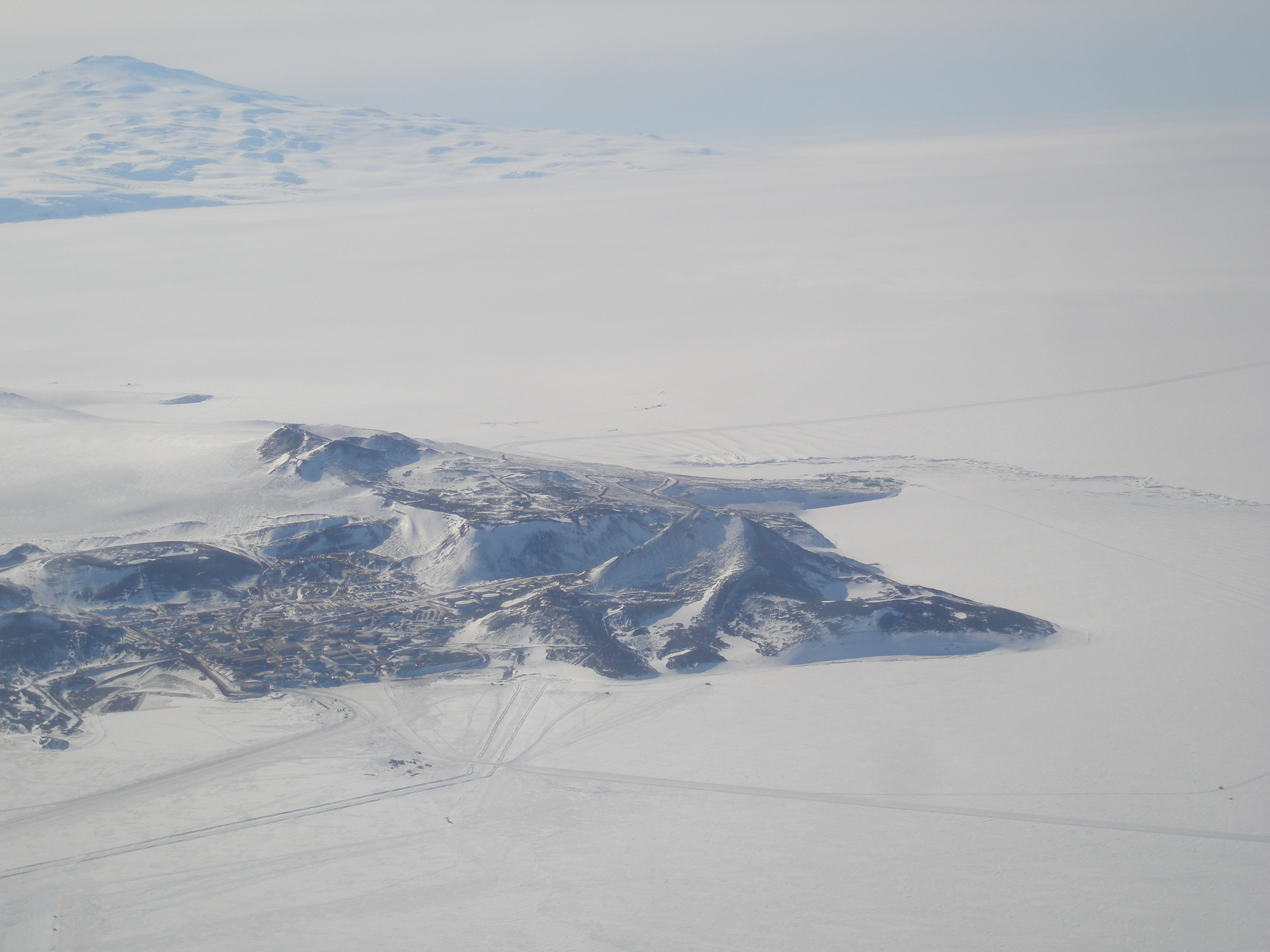
Aerial view of the tip of Hut Point Peninsula with McMurdo Station on the near side and Scott Base on the far side. Mount Terror in the background

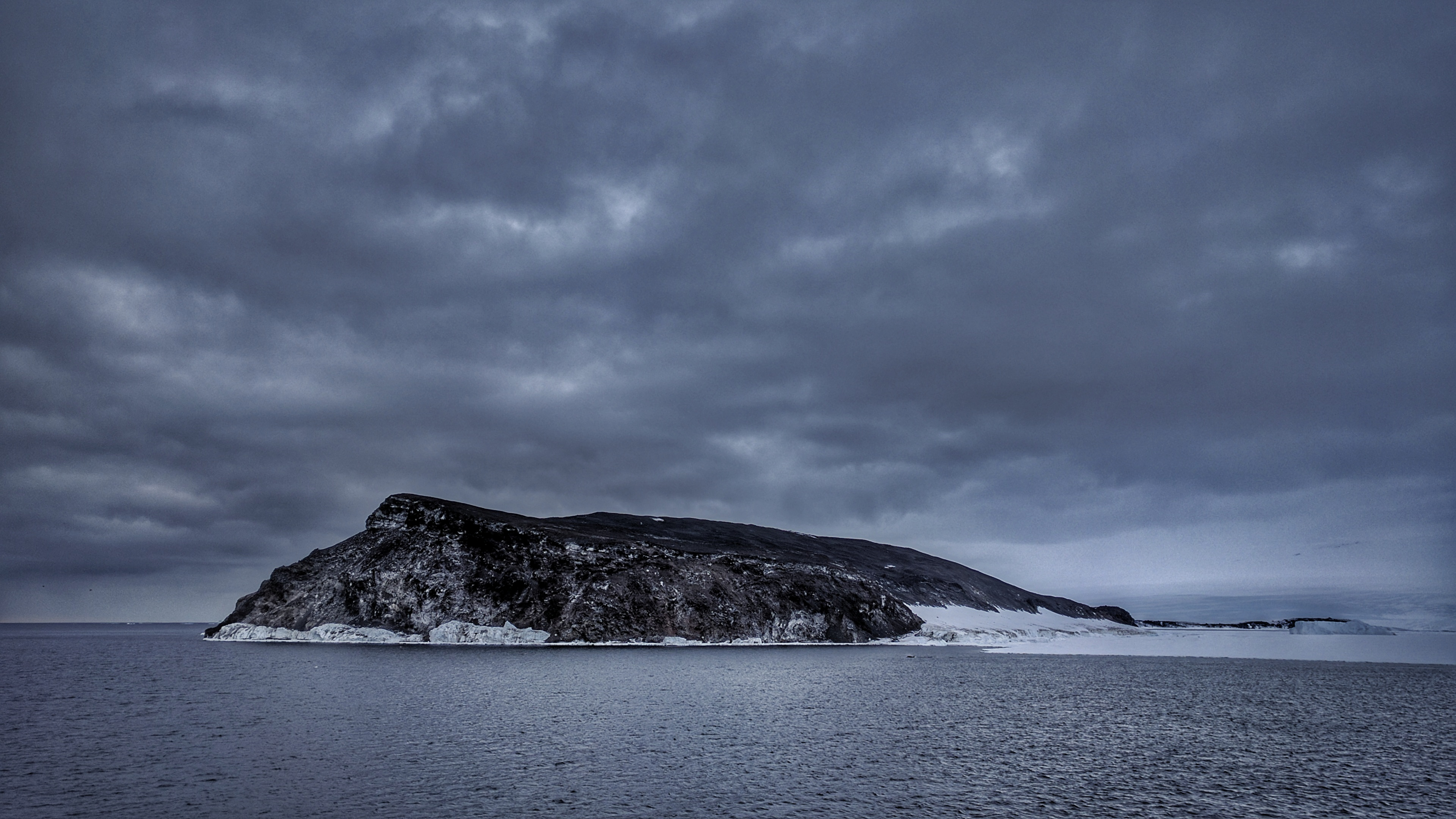
Edge of Ross Island

Capes and peninsulas include, clockwise from the south, the Hut Point Peninsula, Cape Evans, Cape Royds, Cape Bird, Cape Tennyson, Cape Crozier and Cape MacKay.

- Hut Point Peninsula is a long, narrow peninsula from 2 to 3 nautical miles (3.7 to 5.6 km; 2.3 to 3.5 mi) wide and 15 nautical miles (28 km; 17 mi) long, projecting south-west from the slopes of Mount Erebus.
- Cape Evans is a rocky cape on the west side of Ross Island, forming the north side of the entrance to Erebus Bay.
- Cape Royds is a dark rock cape forming the western extremity of Ross Island, facing on McMurdo Sound.
- Cape Bird marks the north extremity of Ross Island.
- Cape Tennyson is a rock cape on the north coast of Ross Island, about 25 nautical miles (46 km; 29 mi) southeast of Cape Bird.
- Cape Crozier is the most easterly point of Ross Island.
- Cape MacKay is an ice-covered cape which forms the southeast extremity of Ross Island.

== Major bays ==
Large bays include Erebus Bay, Wohlschlag Bay, Lewis Bay and Windless Bight.

- Erebus Bay is about 13 nautical miles (24 km; 15 mi) wide between Cape Evans and Hut Point Peninsula, on the west side of Ross Island.
- Wohlschlag Bay is a large bay indenting the west side of Ross Island between Harrison Bluff and Cape Royds.
- Lewis Bay is a bay indenting the north coast of Ross Island between Mount Bird and Cape Tennyson.
- Windless Bight is the prominent bight indenting the south side of Ross Island eastward of Hut Point Peninsula.

== Major glaciers ==
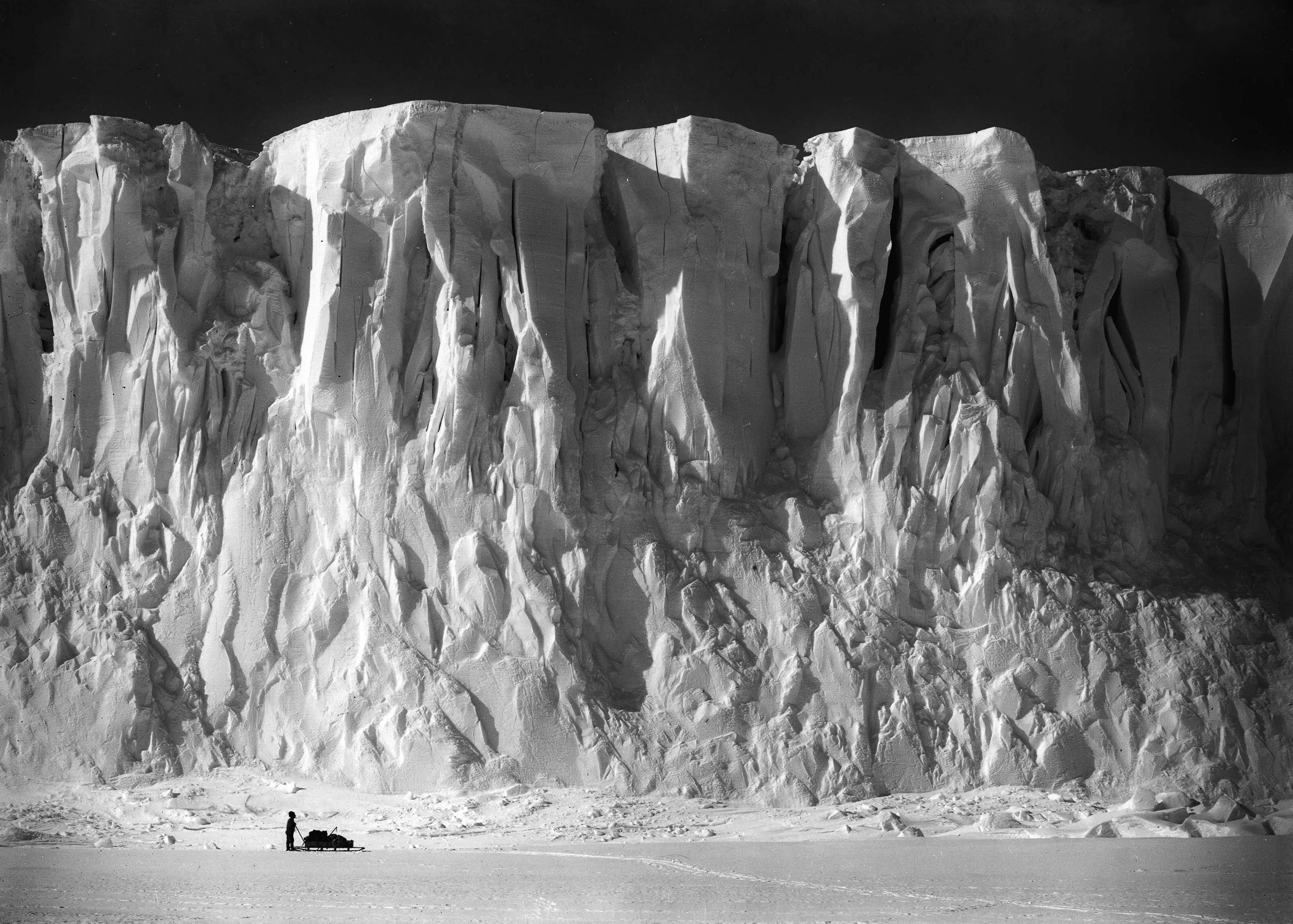
Barne Glacier around 1910

Major glaciers entering the sea or ice cap around the island include, clockwise from the south, Erebus Glacier and the Erebus Glacier Tongue, Barne Glacier, Shell Glacier, Terror Glacier and Aurora Glacier.

- Erebus Glacier is a glacier draining the lower southern slopes of Mount Erebus. It flows west to Erebus Bay where it forms the floating Erebus Glacier Tongue.
- Shell Glacier is a western lobe of the Mount Bird icecap. It descends steeply in the valley north of Trachyte Hill and Harrison Bluff in the center of the ice-free area on the lower western slopes of Mount Bird.
- Barne Glacier is a steep glacier which descends from the west slopes of Mount Erebus and terminates on the west side of Ross Island between Cape Barne and Cape Evans where it forms a steep ice cliff.
- Terror Glacier is a large glacier between Mount Terra Nova and Mount Terror, flowing south into Windless Bight.
- Aurora Glacier is a large glacier draining that part of Ross Island between Mount Erebus and Mount Terra Nova, and flowing south into McMurdo Ice Shelf.

== See also ==
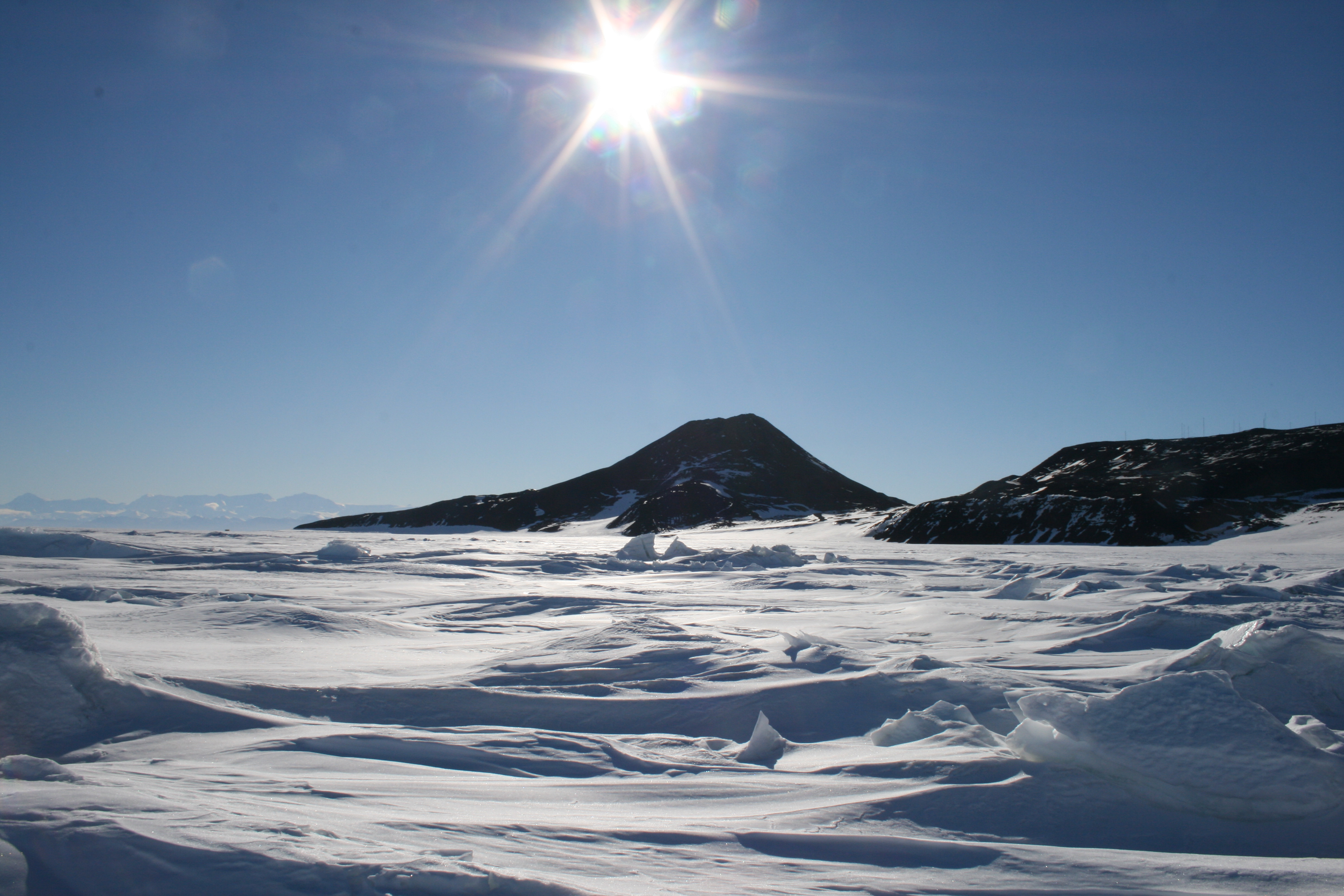
Sea ice and Ross Island

- List of Antarctic and subantarctic islands
- McMurdo Sound
- Ross Sea
- Ross Bank

== Sources ==
- Alberts, Fred G., ed. (1995), Geographic Names of the Antarctic (PDF) (2 ed.), United States Board on Geographic Names This article incorporates public domain material from websites or documents of the United States Board on Geographic Names.
- Antarctic Station Catalogue (PDF) (catalogue), Council of Managers of National Antarctic Programs, August 2017, p. 93, ISBN 978-0-473-40409-3
- Ernest Shackleton’s Hut, Antarctic Heritage Trust
- LeMasurier, W. E.; Thomson, J. W., eds. (1990), Volcanoes of the Antarctic Plate and Southern Oceans, American Geophysical Union, p. 512, ISBN 0-87590-172-7
- McMurdo Station, US National Science Foundation
- Morgan, W.J.; Phipps Morgan, J. (2007), Plate velocities in hotspot reference frame: electronic supplement (PDF)
- Ross Island, USGS: United States Geological Survey
- Scott’s Terra Nova Hut, Antarctic Heritage Trust
- Varetto, Gianni (13 October 2021), "Cape Bird Hut, WAP NZL-NEW", W.A.P. Worldwide Antarctic Program
- Scott's Discovery Hut, Antarctic Heritage Trust

This article incorporates public domain material from websites or documents of the United States Geological Survey.
