= Mount Terror (Antarctica) =

Shield volcano in Antarctica

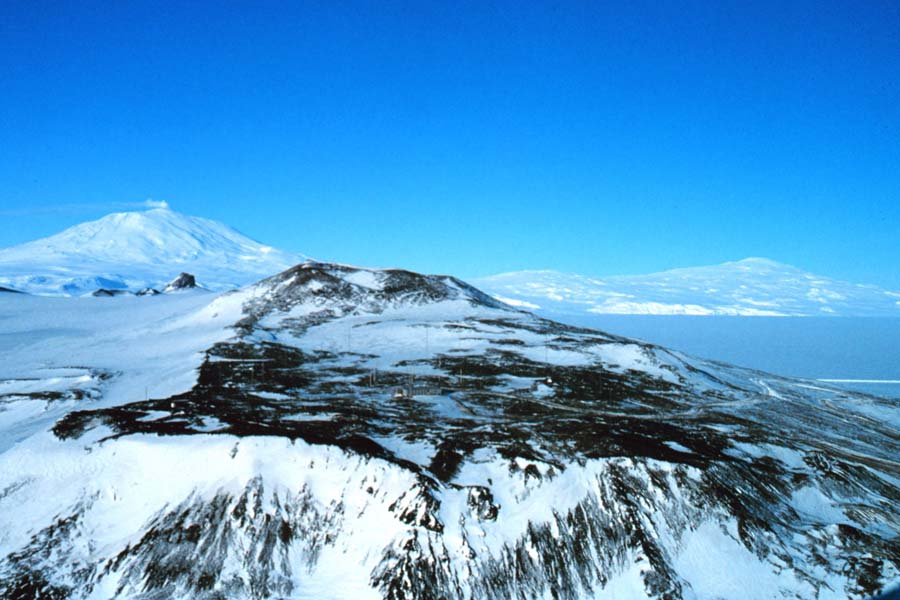
- Mount Terror (right, distant), Mount Erebus (left, nearer) seen from Hut Point Peninsula (foreground), the southernmost point on Ross Island.

Highest point
- Elevation: 3,230 m (10,600 ft)
- Prominence: 1,728 m (5,669 ft)
- Listing: Ultra, Ribu
- Coordinates: 77°31′S 168°32′E

Geography
- Location within Antarctica
- Location: Ross Island, Antarctica

Geology
- Rock age: 820,000–1.75 million years
- Mountain type: Shield volcano (extinct)
- Volcanic belt: McMurdo Volcanic Group

Climbing
- First ascent: 1959
- Easiest route: snow/ice climb

Mount Terror is an extinct volcano about 3,230 metres (10,600 ft) high on Ross Island, Antarctica, about 20 nautical miles (37 km; 23 mi) eastward of Mount Erebus. Mount Terror was named in 1841 by polar explorer James Clark Ross after his second ship, HMS Terror.

== Geology ==
Mount Terror is a shield volcano that forms the eastern part of Ross Island, Antarctica. It has numerous cinder cones and domes on the flanks of the shield and is mostly under snow and ice. It is the second-largest of the four volcanoes that make up Ross Island.

== Geography ==
The rocks at the summit have not been studied, but rocks from the lower areas range from 0.82 to 1.75 million years old, and Mount Terror shows no signs of more recent volcanic activity. The first ascent of Mount Terror was made by a New Zealand party in 1959. The mountain is to the west of Cape Crozier, and east of Mount Terra Nova and Mount Erebus.

== Central features ==
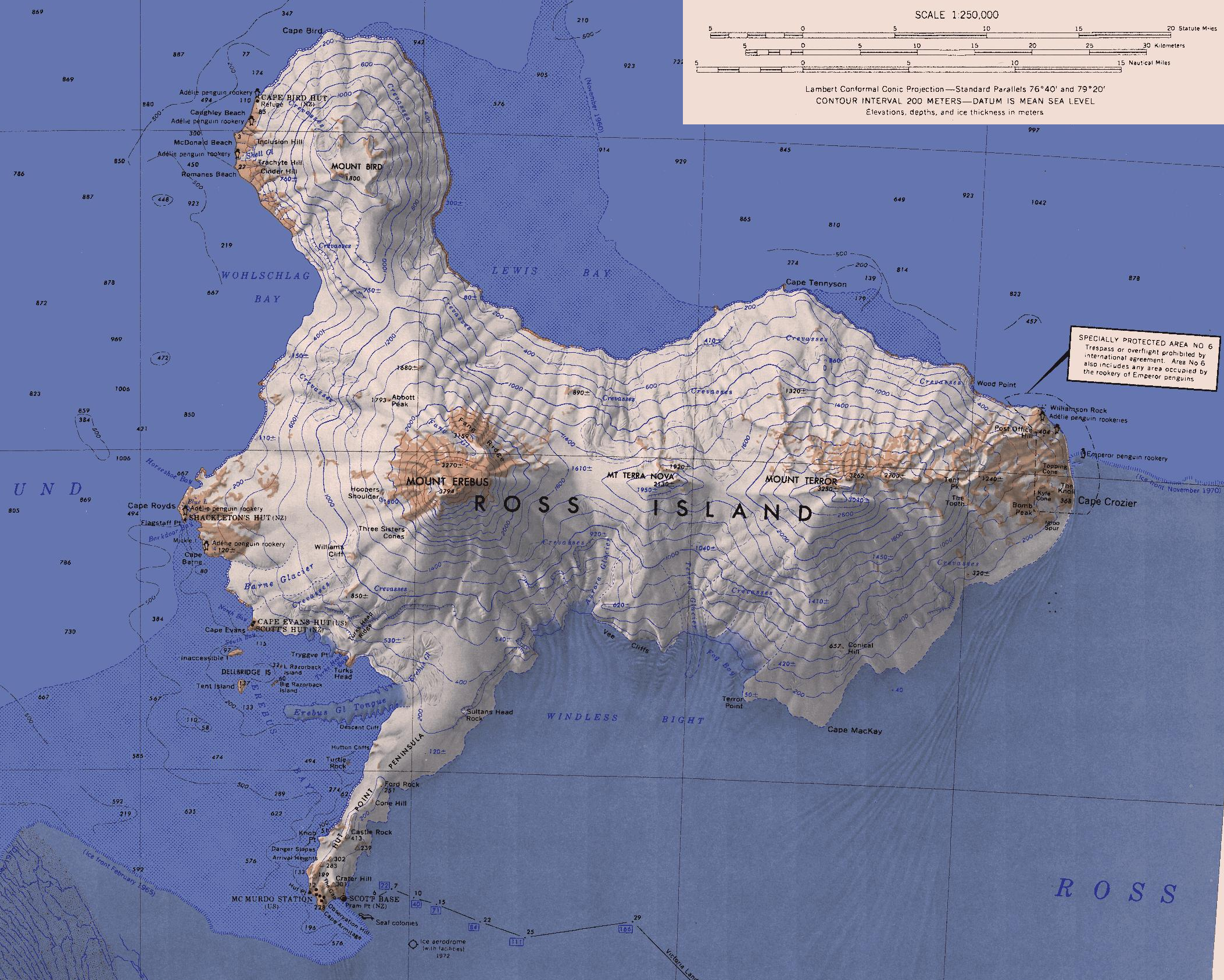
Ross Island. Mount Terror is to the east

=== Kienle Nunataks ===
77.4666667°S 168.6°E. Three aligned nunataks to the north of Mount Terror in northeast Ross Island. The nunataks trend east-west for 1 nautical mile (1.9 km; 1.2 mi) and rise to about 1,700 metres (5,600 ft). The central nunatak is 2.5 nautical miles (4.6 km; 2.9 mi) north-northeast of the Mount Terror summit. At the suggestion of P.R. Kyle, named by Advisory Committee on Antarctic Names (US-ACAN) after Juergen Kienle (d.), Geophysical Institute, University of Alaska, Fairbanks, a United States Antarctic Project (USAP) team leader for the investigation of volcanic activity and seismicity on Mount Erebus in six field seasons, 1980-81 through 1985-86.

=== Mount Sutherland ===
77.5°S 168.4666667°E. A peak 1.4 nautical miles (2.6 km; 1.6 mi) west-northwest of the summit of Mount Terror on Ross Island. The feature rises to about 2,500 metres (8,200 ft). Named by Advisory Committee on Antarctic Names (US-ACAN) (2000) after Alexander L. Sutherland, Jr., Ocean Projects Manager, OPP, NSF, with responsibility for directing operations and logistics for United States Antarctic Project (USAP) research vessels from 1989; responsible for acquisition of the Research Vessel/Ice Breakers Nathaniel B. Palmer and Laurence M. Gould.

=== Rohnke Crests ===
77.5833333°S 168.6833333°E. Two rock ridges, about 1,400 metres (4,600 ft) high, that are parallel and rise above the general ice mantle on the southeast slopes of Mount Terror. This feature is east of the head of Eastwind Glacier and 4 nautical miles (7.4 km; 4.6 mi) northeast of Conical Hill. Names in association with Eastwind Glacier after Captain (later Rear Admiral) Oscar C. Rohnke, USCG, who commanded United States Coast Guard Cutter (USCGC) Eastwind in Ross Sea during United States Navy (United States Navy) Operation Deep Freeze (OpDFrz) I, 1955-56.

=== Moore Peak ===
77.5166667°S 168.45°E. A peak rising to 2,500 metres (8,200 ft) high on the west slope of Mount Terror, Ross Island. The peak is 1.6 nautical miles (3.0 km; 1.8 mi) west-southwest of the summit of Mount Terror and 1 nautical mile (1.9 km; 1.2 mi) south of Mount Sutherland. At the suggestion of P.R. Kyle, named by Advisory Committee on Antarctic Names (US-ACAN) (2000) after James A. Moore, a member of the New Mexico Institute of Mining and Technology team on Mount Erebus in the 1983–84 and 1985-86 field seasons. He completed his M.S. thesis on the geology of Mount Erebus.

=== Ohau Peak ===
77.5°S 168.7°E. A sharp rock peak 1.9 nautical miles (3.5 km; 2.2 mi) northeast of the summit of Mount Terror on Ross Island. The feature rises to about 2,400 metres (7,900 ft) high and is central in three aligned summits 0.8 nautical miles (1.5 km; 0.92 mi) north of Mount McIntosh. Named by New Zealand Geographic Board (NZGB) (2000) after a peak near the locality of Tekapo (see Tekapo Ridge), New Zealand.

== Giggenbach Ridge ==
77.4666667°S 168.3333333°E. A north-south chain of summits, 5 nautical miles (9.3 km; 5.8 mi) long, located to the west and northwest of Mount Terror. The ridge rises to about 2,400 metres (7,900 ft) west of Mount Terror, but descends to 1,320 metres (4,330 ft) at the north end. Named at the suggestion of P.R. Kyle, named by Advisory Committee on Antarctic Names (US-ACAN) (2000) after Werner F. Giggenbach, Chemistry Division, DSIR, who worked in the NZAP at Mount Erebus in four field seasons during the 1970s. He rappelled into the Inner Crater of Mount Erebus in 1978, but had to be pulled out when an eruption showered him and colleagues on the crater rim with volcanic bombs. He was one of the leading volcanic gas geochemists of the period.

=== Chuan Peak ===
77.4833333°S 168.35°E. A peak, about 2,200 metres (7,200 ft) high, located 1 nautical mile (1.9 km; 1.2 mi) northeast of Barker Peak in the south part of Giggenbach Ridge, Ross Island. At the suggestion of P.R. Kyle, named by Advisory Committee on Antarctic Names (US-ACAN) (2000) after Raymond L. Chuan who, as a scientist with the Brunswick Corporation, Costa Mesa, CA, undertook many airborne surveys of volcanic aerosols from Mount Erebus and also did sampling at the crater rim, 1983–84 and 1986–87; investigator (with Julie Palais) on a project which examined aerosols between Mount Erebus and the South Pole.

=== Manahan Peak ===
77.4833333°S 168.4333333°E. A prominent peak 1 nautical mile (1.9 km; 1.2 mi) east of Giggenbach Ridge in northeast Ross Island. The peak rises to over 2,000 metres (6,600 ft) high 2.6 nautical miles (4.8 km; 3.0 mi) northwest of the summit of Mount Terror. Named by the Advisory Committee on Antarctic Names (US-ACAN) (2000) after biologist Donal T. Manahan, who worked eight seasons in Antarctica from 1983; United States Antarctic Project (USAP) principal investigator in study of early stages (embryos larvae) of marine animals; chair, Polar Research Board, National Academy of Sciences, 2000.

=== Barker Peak ===
77.5°S 168.3°E. A peak 3.6 nautical miles (6.7 km; 4.1 mi) west-northwest of Mount Terror on Ross Island. The feature rises to about 2,200 metres (7,200 ft) high and is the western of two peaks near the south end of Giggenbach Ridge. Name by New Zealand Geographic Board (NZGB) (2000) after Major James R. M. Barker, officer in command at Scott Base, 1970–71; a NZAP manager, 1970-86.

=== Joyce Peak ===
77.4666667°S 168.2°E. A peak rising to over 1,400 metres (4,600 ft) high in the north-central part of Ross Island. It stands west of the main summits of Giggenbach Ridge and 5.3 miles (8.5 km) south-southeast of Wyandot Point. Named by Advisory Committee on Antarctic Names (US-ACAN) (2000) after Karen Joyce, a long-term ASA employee, who from 1990 made 10 deployments to McMurdo Station, including a winter-over; assisted with computers in the Crary Science and Engineering Center.

=== Kristin Peak ===
77.4333333°S 168.3166667°E. A peak rising to over 1,300 metres (4,300 ft) high at the north end of Giggenbach Ridge on Ross Island. The feature is 4.5 nautical miles (8.3 km; 5.2 mi) south of Cape Tennyson. Named by Advisory Committee on Antarctic Names (US-ACAN) (2000) after Kristin Larson, who has participated in support activities to United States Antarctic Project (USAP) from 1988, including two winters at McMurdo Station; supervisor, Eklund Biological Center and Thiel Labs, 1988 and 1992; supervisor, Crary Science and Engineering Center, 1992–95; editor, The Antarctican Society newsletter from 1996; later of staff of OPP, NSF.

== Eastern features ==
Features to the east, towards the Kyle Hills, include:

=== Tent Peak ===
77°30′S 168°58′E. A tent-shaped peak rising to about 1,570 metres (5,150 ft) high midway between Mount Terror and Cape Crozier. It was descriptively named by a party of the New Zealand Geological Survey Antarctic Expedition (NZGSAE), 1958–59, which occupied the peak as an astronomical control station, January 5, 1959, and erected a tent below the peak.

=== The Tooth ===
77°31′S 168°59′E. A distinctive rock outcrop on the eastern slopes of Mount Terror at an elevation of about 1,400 metres (4,600 ft). The feature lies 1 nautical mile (1.9 km; 1.2 mi) south-southeast of Tent Peak and is reported to resemble a fossilized shark's tooth. Descriptively named by a party of the NZGSAE, 1958–59, working in eastern Ross Island.

=== Slattery Peak ===
77.5666667°S 168.9833333°E. A somewhat isolated rock peak, about 600 metres (2,000 ft) high, that rises above the ice mantle southeast of Mount Terror. The peak position is additionally defined as 5.5 nautical miles (10.2 km; 6.3 mi) southwest of The Knoll and 3.8 nautical miles (7.0 km; 4.4 mi) east-northeast of Rohnke Crests. Named after Leo Slattery, who wintered at Scott Base three times, twice as Officer in Charge; Post Clerk on Ross Island, summer 1973-74; Postmaster on Ross Island, summers 1979-80, 1981–82, and 1983–84.

=== Pönui Nunatak ===
77.5833333°S 169.0166667°E. A nunatak located 0.6 nautical miles (1.1 km; 0.69 mi) southeast of Slattery Peak and 5.6 nautical miles (10.4 km; 6.4 mi) southwest of The Knoll. The feature rises to 320 metres (1,050 ft) high near the juncture of the island and Ross Ice Shelf. The name Ponui (meaning south wind) is one of several Maori wind names applied by New Zealand Geographic Board (NZGB) in this vicinity.

=== Conical Hill ===
77°39′S 168°34′E. A small but distinctive rock hill, 655 metres (2,149 ft) high, on the south slopes of Mount Terror, above Cape MacKay. Given this descriptive name by the British Antarctic Expedition, 1910–13, under Scott.

== Cultural references ==
- Mount Terror is the stronghold of Russian anarchist revolutionaries in the 1894 science fiction novel Olga Romanoff by George Griffith.
- Mount Terror and Mount Erebus are mentioned in the 1936 novella At the Mountains of Madness by H.P. Lovecraft.
- Mount Terror is used as a location in the 2004 novel State of Fear by Michael Crichton.
- Mount Terror is referenced in Jules Verne's Twenty Thousand Leagues Under the Seas by the narrator Professor Arronax, after they arrive at the South Pole, in reference to two volcanic craters, the Erebus and Terror, in context to an earlier discovery by James Clark Ross.

== Sources ==
- Alberts, Fred G., ed. (1995), Geographic Names of the Antarctic (PDF) (2 ed.), United States Board on Geographic Names This article incorporates public domain material from websites or documents of the United States Board on Geographic Names.
- "Barker Peak", Geographic Names Information System, United States Geological Survey, United States Department of the Interior
- "Chuan Peak", Geographic Names Information System, United States Geological Survey, United States Department of the Interior
- "Giggenbach Ridge", Geographic Names Information System, United States Geological Survey, United States Department of the Interior
- "Joyce Peak", Geographic Names Information System, United States Geological Survey, United States Department of the Interior
- "Kienle Nunataks", Geographic Names Information System, United States Geological Survey, United States Department of the Interior
- "Kristin Peak", Geographic Names Information System, United States Geological Survey, United States Department of the Interior
- "Manahan Peak", Geographic Names Information System, United States Geological Survey, United States Department of the Interior
- "Moore Peak", Geographic Names Information System, United States Geological Survey, United States Department of the Interior
- "Mount Sutherland", Geographic Names Information System, United States Geological Survey, United States Department of the Interior
- "Ohau Peak", Geographic Names Information System, United States Geological Survey, United States Department of the Interior
- "Pönui Nunatak", Geographic Names Information System, United States Geological Survey, United States Department of the Interior
- "Rohnke Crests", Geographic Names Information System, United States Geological Survey, United States Department of the Interior
- Ross Island, USGS: United States Geological Survey
- "Slattery Peak", Geographic Names Information System, United States Geological Survey, United States Department of the Interior

This article incorporates public domain material from websites or documents of the United States Geological Survey.
