= Thelma Rodgers =

Antarctic scientist

- Born: Thelma Ann Bishton; 1 December 1947; Swansea, United Kingdom
- Died: 12 October 2021 (aged 73)
- Education: University of Canterbury
- Occupations: Architect, Antarctic science technician

Thelma Ann Rodgers (née Bishton; 1 December 1947 – 12 October 2021) was a New Zealand Antarctic science technician and architect. She was the first woman to spend a winter at Scott Base, New Zealand's scientific base in Antarctica.

== Early life and education ==
Rodgers was born in Swansea, and moved to New Zealand with her family as a child. She grew up in the Nelson area of the South Island of New Zealand. Although she wanted to study physics and chemistry in college she was discouraged from doing so because she was a woman. However despite starting an arts degree at Canterbury University, she ultimately completed a physics degree.

== Career ==
Rodgers worked as a science technician in the geophysics division of the Department of Scientific and Industrial Research. She became an equipment expert for the Geomagnetic Division in Christchurch and instructed the technicians heading to Scott Base on the operation of the geophysical equipment. She completed summer service at the base in 1976–77.

In 1978, she applied to the Antarctic Division to operate the equipment at Scott Base herself over the winter, and in 1979 she became the first woman to winter-over at the base. Just a decade earlier men believed the climate in Antarctica was too harsh for women.

Rodgers Point at Hut Point Peninsula was named after her by the New Zealand Geographic Board in 2000. In 2017, laboratories in the newly refurbished Hillary Field Centre at Scott Base were named after her, Margaret Bradshaw and Pamela Young.

Rodgers later re-trained as an architect. She died on 12 October 2021.
