= Ross Bank =

- Submerged bank Ross Bank (Antarctica)
- Interactive map of Ross Bank
- Ocean: Southern Ocean

Ross Bank (76°45′S 176°0′W) is a submarine bank located in the Ross Sea in the area of Ross Island. Name approved 6/88 (ACUF 228).
