= Lewis Bay =

Bay in Antarctica

- Location within Antarctica
- Location: Ross Island, Antarctica
- Coordinates: 77°20′S 167°31′E
- Basin countries: Antarctica

Lewis Bay is a bay indenting the north coast of Ross Island, Antarctica, between Mount Bird and Cape Tennyson.

== History ==
The bay was charted by the British National Antarctic Expedition under Robert Falcon Scott, 1901–04. It was named by the Advisory Committee on Antarctic Names in 1964 for Captain Price Lewis, commanding officer of the USS Staten Island (AGB-5) during the US Navy's Operation Deep Freeze in 1959, and who in 1963 and 1964 was assistant chief of staff and ship group commander of the United States Naval Support Force in Antarctica.

=== Air crash ===
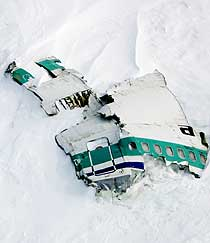
Debris from the air crash photographed at the site in 2004, on the 25th anniversary of the disaster

On 28 November 1979 an Air New Zealand aircraft carrying 257 people on a sightseeing flight to Antarctica crashed on the side of Mount Erebus, killing everyone aboard and scattering bodies and aircraft debris on the slopes above the bay. Not all the bodies were subsequently recovered.

=== Antarctic Specially Protected Area ===
An area above Lewis Bay, on the lower slopes of Mount Erebus and extending to the coast, is protected as Antarctic Specially Protected Area No.156 because it has been declared a tomb in order to ensure that the area be left in peace. The declaration was made as a mark of respect and sympathy with the relatives of those who died in the 1979 crash, and with the Government and people of New Zealand, in remembrance and in order to protect the site's emotional values.

=== Historic site ===
A stainless steel cross was erected in January 1987 on a rocky promontory 3 km from the 1979 crash site as a mark of respect and in remembrance of those who died. The cross has been designated a Historic Site or Monument (HSM 73), following a proposal by New Zealand to the Antarctic Treaty Consultative Meeting.

== Features ==
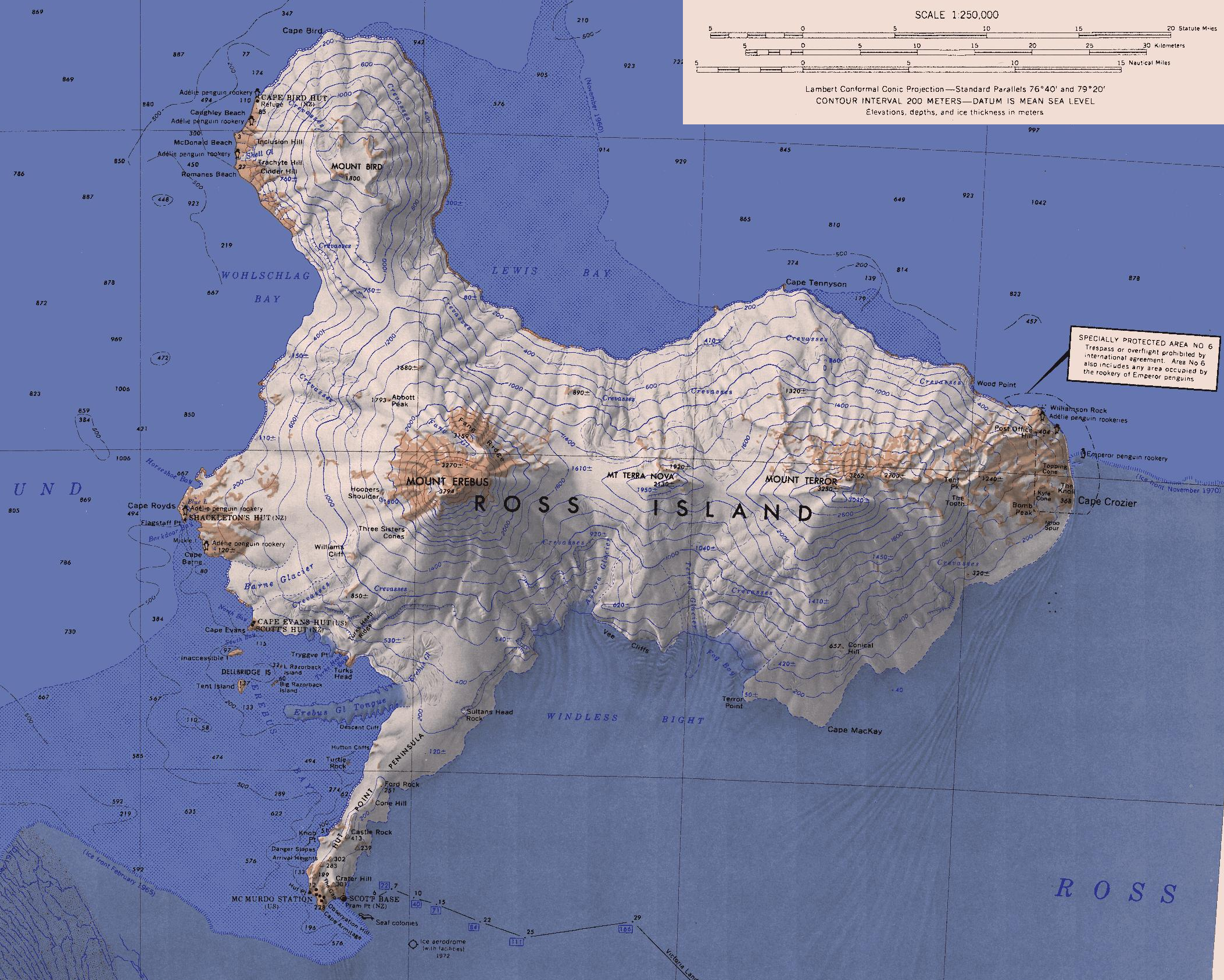
Ross Island. Lewis Bay in north center of map

=== Cape Tennyson ===
77°22′S 168°18′E. A rock cape on the north coast of Ross Island, about 25 nautical miles (46 km; 29 mi) southeast of Cape Bird. Discovered in February 1900 by the British Antarctic Expedition, 1898–1900 under Carsten Borchgrevink, and named by him for English poet Alfred, Lord Tennyson.

=== Wyandot Point ===
77.3833333°S 168.0666667°E. A rock point 3 nautical miles (5.6 km; 3.5 mi) west-southwest of Cape Tennyson on the north side of Ross Island. In association with the names of expedition ships grouped on this island, named after United States Naval Ship (United States NavyS) Wyandot, a transport ship that carried supplies to this area in at least 13 seasons, 1955-56 to 1971-72.

== Sources ==
- Alberts, Fred G., ed. (1995), Geographic Names of the Antarctic (PDF) (2 ed.), United States Board on Geographic Names This article incorporates public domain material from websites or documents of the United States Board on Geographic Names.
- "Wyandot Point", Geographic Names Information System, United States Geological Survey, United States Department of the Interior

This article incorporates public domain material from websites or documents of the United States Geological Survey.
