= Hut Point Peninsula =

Landform on Ross Island, Antarctica

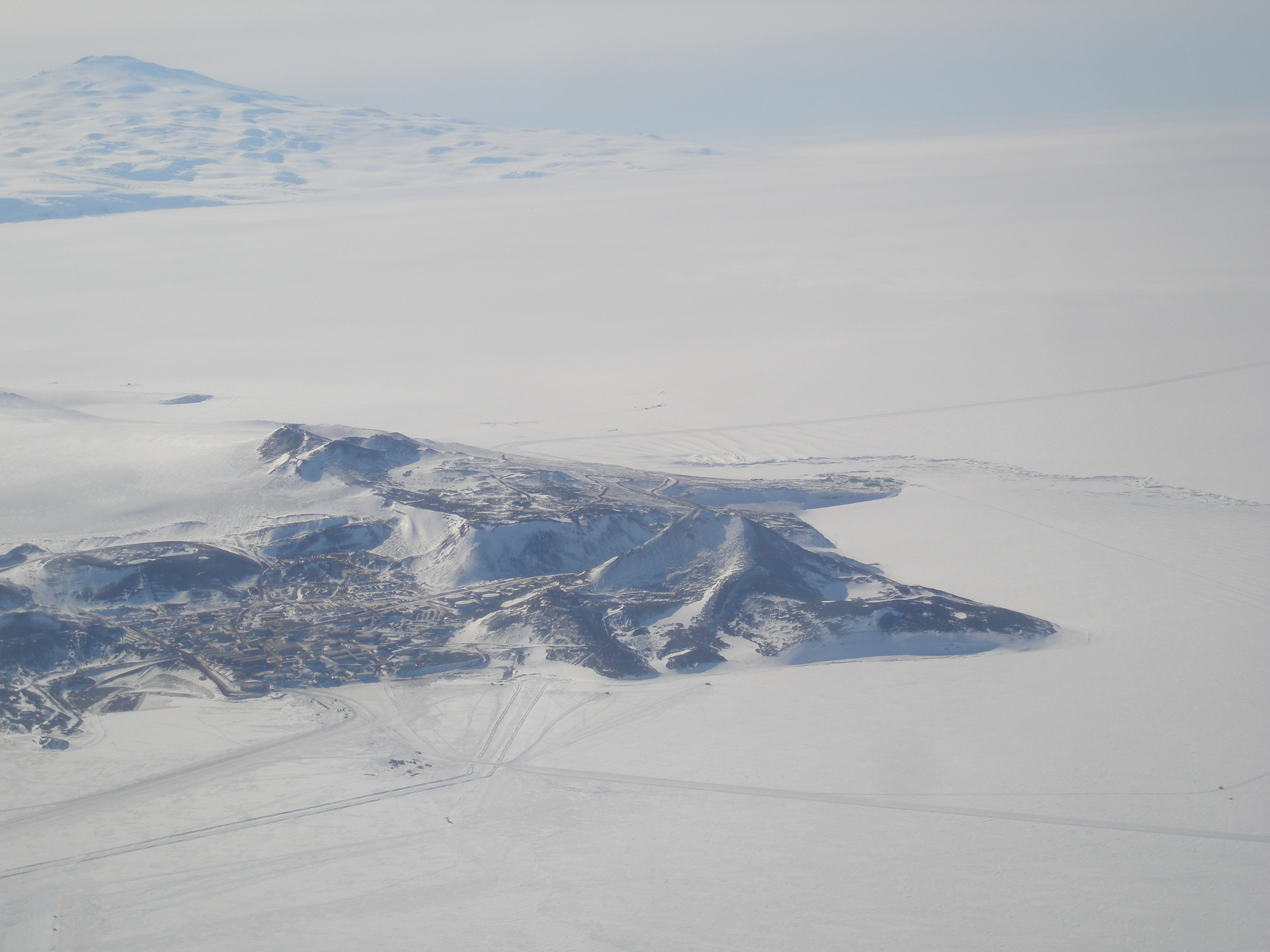
- Aerial view of the tip of Hut Point Peninsula with McMurdo Station on the near side and Scott Base on the far side

- Location within Antarctica

Geography
- Location: Antarctica
- Coordinates: 77°47′S 166°51′E

Administration
- Antarctica
- Administered under the Antarctic Treaty System

Hut Point Peninsula (77°47′S 166°51′E) is a long, narrow peninsula from 2 to 3 nautical miles (3.7 to 5.6 km; 2.3 to 3.5 mi) wide and 15 nautical miles (28 km; 17 mi) long, projecting south-west from the slopes of Mount Erebus on Ross Island, Antarctica. McMurdo Station (US) and Scott Base (NZ) are Antarctic research stations located on the Hut Point Peninsula.

It is also home to historical sites including the Discovery Hut from Robert Falcon Scott's 1901 expedition, and memorials of various types. Hut Point Peninsula is the most inhabited place on Antarctica since the 1950s and is continuously occupied.

== History ==
The British National Antarctic Expedition (1901–04) under Robert Falcon Scott built its Discovery Hut on Hut Point, at the southern headland of the peninsula. Members of the British Antarctic Expedition, 1910–13 (BAE), under Scott, wintering on Cape Evans and often using the hut during their journeys, came to refer to the whole peninsula as the Hut Point Peninsula.

=== Historic sites and monuments ===
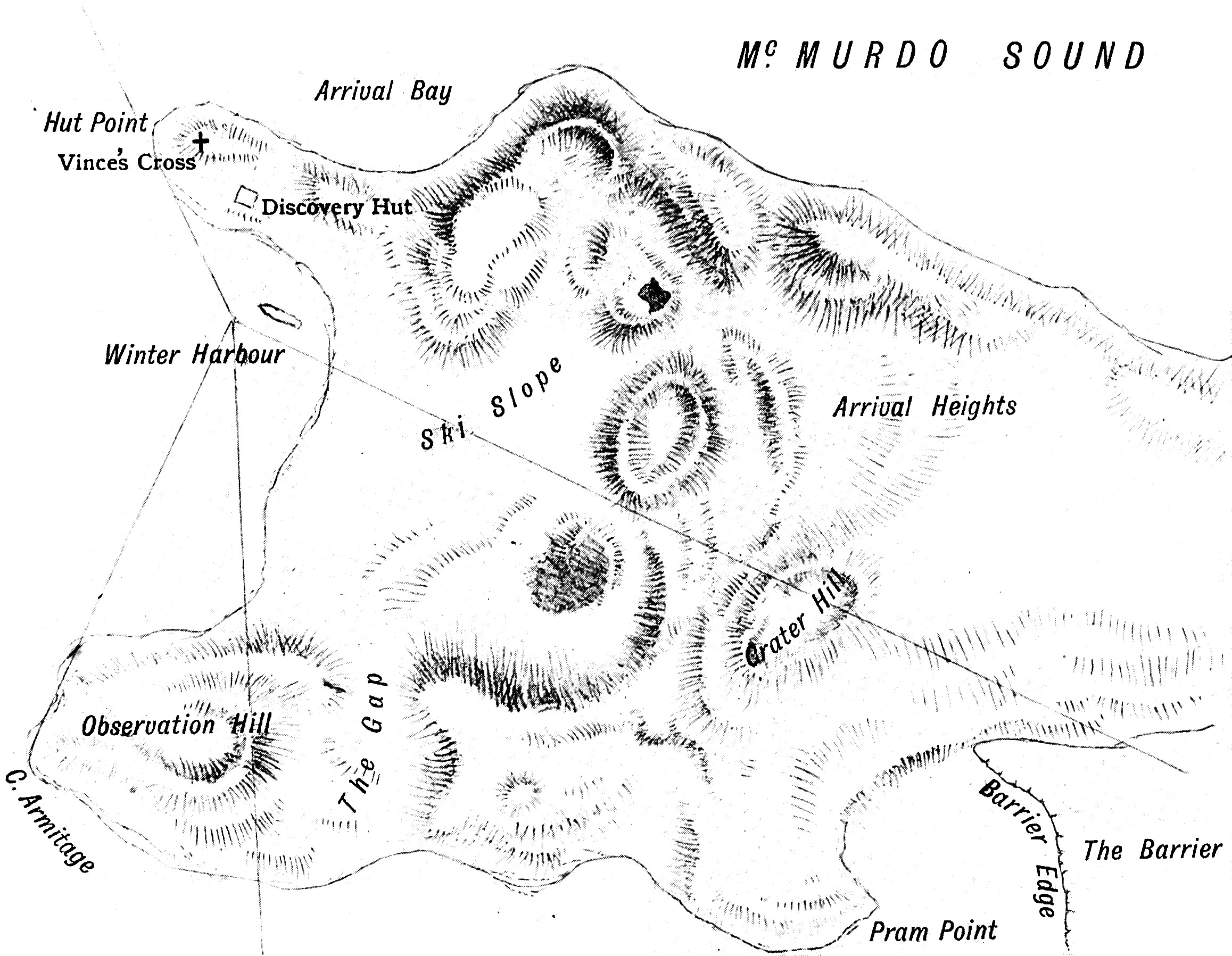
Edward Wilson's map of Hut Point Peninsula, circa 1910

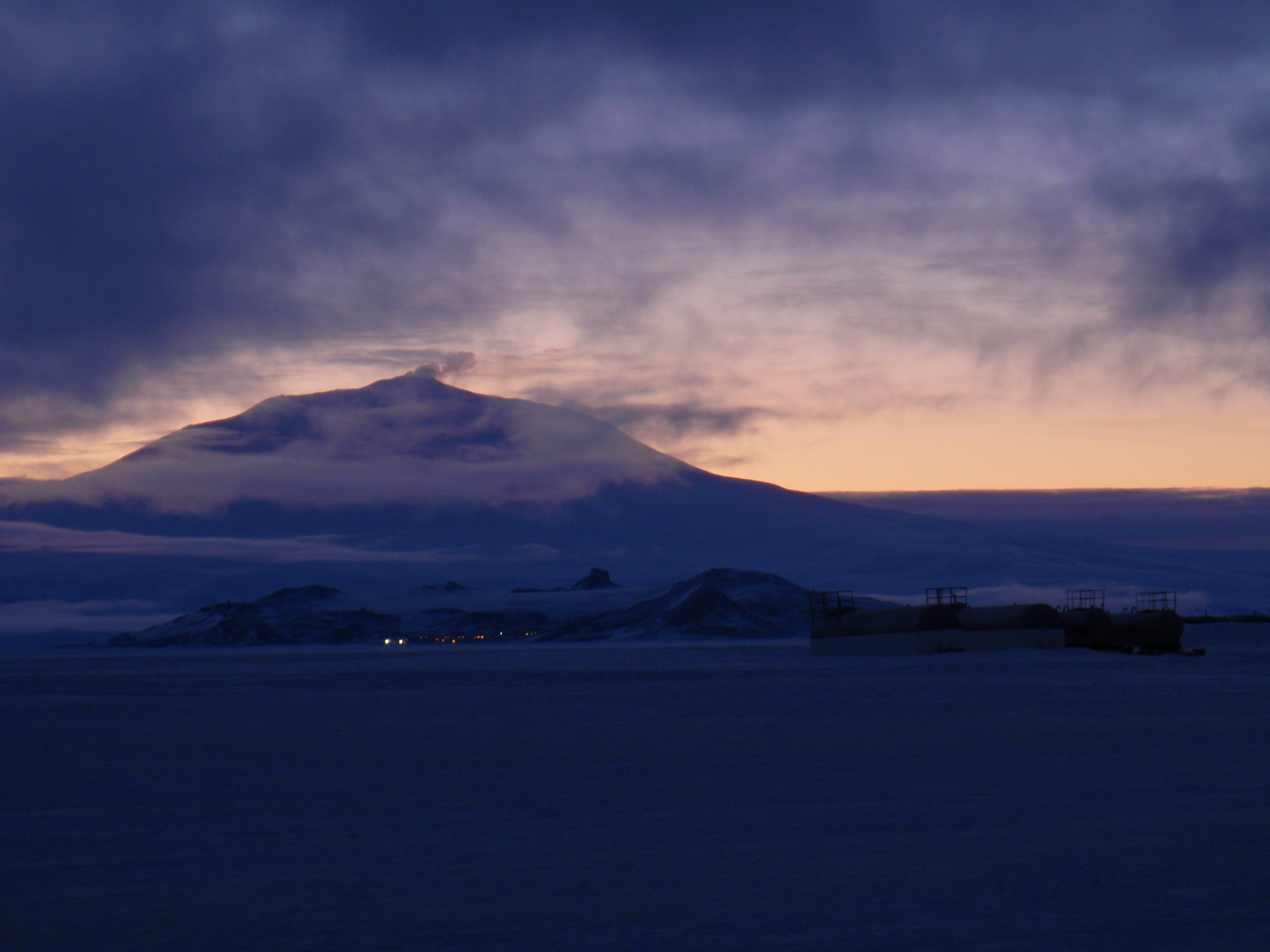
Ross Island's Mount Erebus looms over McMurdo and Scott lighting up the polar twilight on Hut Point Peninsula (view looking north)

Several features on Hut Point, including the cross memorial for George Vince and the store hut for the Scott expeditions, are protected under the Antarctic Treaty. Both the cross (HSM 19) and the hut (HSM 18) have been designated Historic Sites or Monuments, following proposals by New Zealand and the United Kingdom to the Antarctic Treaty Consultative Meeting. The point is protected as Antarctic Specially Protected Area No.158 largely because of its historic significance as one of the principal sites of early human activity in Antarctica.

== Features ==
Hut Point Peninsula consists of a series of basaltic scoria cones, craters and domes that were formed in the last 1.34 million years. Other features around the Hut Point Peninsula include Sultans Head Rock, Descent Cliff, Hutton Cliffs, Turtle Rock, Knob Point, Danger Slopes, Arrival Heights, Crater Hill, Hut Point, Cape Armitage, Observation Hill, The Gap and Pram Point.

== Craters ==
=== First Crater ===
77°50′S 166°39′E. A crater on Arrival Heights, located 0.75 nautical miles (1.39 km; 0.86 mi) north of Hut Point. Named by Debenham in 1912 on his local survey of Hut Point Peninsula during the British Antarctic Expedition, 1910-13.

=== Second Crater ===
77°49′S 166°40′E. A crater on Arrival Heights, situated 0.6 nautical miles (1.1 km; 0.69 mi) northeast of First Crater. Named by F. Debenham in 1912 on his local survey of Hut Point Peninsula during the British Antarctic Expedition, 1910-13.

=== Sheppard Crater ===
77.805347°S 166.841572°E. A distinctive breached crater rising to 200 metres (660 ft) high about 0.8 nautical miles (1.5 km; 0.92 mi) east of Castle Rock. Named in 2000 by New Zealand Geographic Board (NZGB) after Deirdre Jeanette Sheppard, DSIR Antarctic Division/NZAP/Antarctica NZ librarian, 1980-96, who worked one season at Vanda Station.

=== Half Moon Crater ===
77.807744°S 166.747093°E. A crater 0.5 nautical miles (0.93 km; 0.58 mi) southwest of Castle Rock. Descriptively named for its shape by Frank Debenham of British Antarctic Expedition (British Antarctic Expedition), 1910-13, who made a plane table survey of the peninsula in 1912.

=== Twin Crater ===
77.840604°S 166.686128°E. A crater with twin nested cones that rises behind McMurdo Station and 0.5 nautical miles (0.93 km; 0.58 mi) west of Crater Hill. This crater was named Middle Crater by Frank Debenham of the British Antarctic Expedition (British Antarctic Expedition), 1910-13, apparently for its location in relation to First Crater and Crater Hill, but the name has fallen into disuse. Twin Crater, alluding to the nested cones in the crater, was applied as early as 1971 and the name has become established because of consistent use in current maps and reports.

== Northern features ==
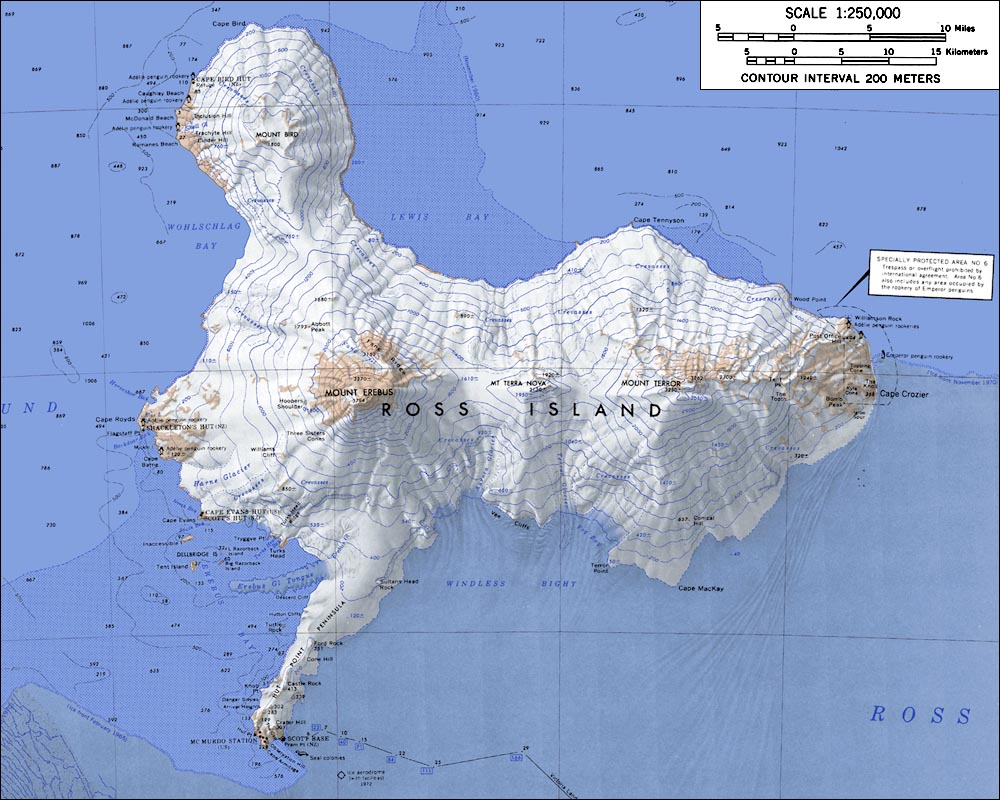
Ross Island. Hut Point in the southwest

Features in the north of the peninsula, from north to south, include

=== Centipede Nunatak ===
77.747205°S 166.892322°E. A narrow nunatak that is 0.3 nautical miles (0.56 km; 0.35 mi) long, located 0.8 nautical miles (1.5 km; 0.92 mi) north-northwest of Ford Rock in central Hut Point Peninsula. The name is allusive; snow that cuts across parts of the nunatak gives it a segmented appearance resembling that of a centipede. Named by the Advisory Committee on Antarctic Names (US-ACAN), 2000.

=== Rodgers Point ===
77.767734°S 166.783895°E. A point 2.5 nautical miles (4.6 km; 2.9 mi) northeast of Knob Point on the west side of Hut Point Peninsula. Named by New Zealand Geographic Board (NZGB) (2000) after Thelma Rodgers, scientific officer, who was the first woman to winter-over at Scott Base, 1979.

=== Ford Rock ===
77°46′S 166°53′E. A prominent rock 1 nautical mile (1.9 km; 1.2 mi) northeast of Cone Hill. Cone Hill and this rock were designated "Cone Hill I" and "Cone Hill II," respectively, by the British Antarctic Expedition under Scott, 1910-13. Cone Hill has been approved for Scott's "Cone Hill I," but a new name suggested by A.J. Heine has been substituted for this prominent rock. M.R.J. Ford, New Zealand surveyor, established a survey beacon network for the McMurdo Ice Shelf Project, 1962-63. A survey beacon was established earlier on this rock by a United States Hydrographic Office survey team, 1955-56.

=== Cone Hill ===
77°47′S 166°51′E. A hill 2 nautical miles (3.7 km; 2.3 mi) northeast of Castle Rock. The descriptive name "Cone Hill I" was used by the British Antarctic Expedition under Robert Falcon Scott, 1910-13, but the form Cone Hill has come into general use.

=== Ackley Point ===
77.789466°S 166.920391°E. An ice-covered point 1 nautical mile (1.9 km; 1.2 mi) southeast of Cone Hill on the east side of Hut Point Peninsula. Named by the Advisory Committee on Antarctic Names (US-ACAN) in 2000 after Stephen F. Ackley, Snow and Ice Division, U.S. Army Cold Regions Research and Engineering Laboratory (CRREL), Hanover, New Hampshire, a U.S. Antarctic Project (USAP) sea ice specialist who worked in McMurdo Sod and diverse parts of the Southern Ocean for more than 25 years, dating from the 1976-77 austral season.

== Central features ==
Features in the center of the peninsula, from north to south, include

=== Knob Point ===
77°48′S 166°40′E. A rounded coastal point on the west side of Hut Point Peninsula. The feature lies 1.5 nautical miles (2.8 km; 1.7 mi) west of Castle Rock. The name was adopted by US-ACAN on the recommendation of Gerald L. Kooyman, USARP biologist who studied physiological characteristics related to diving in the Weddell seal in this vicinity, 1963-64 and 1964-65. Kooyman reported that this descriptive name was already in use by other field workers in the area.

=== Castle Rock ===
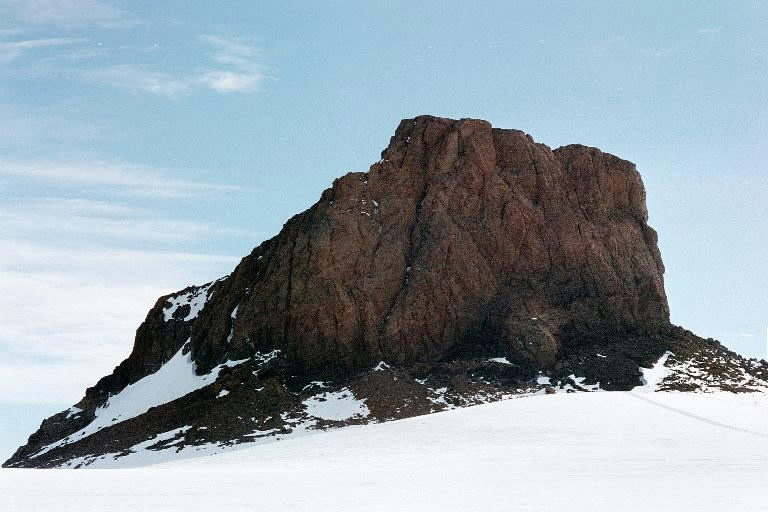
Castle Rock

77°48′S 166°46′E. Bold rock crag, 415 metres (1,362 ft) high, standing 3 nautical miles (5.6 km; 3.5 mi) northeast of Hut Point on the central ridge of Hut Point Peninsula. Discovered by the British National Antarctic Expedition (BrNAE) (1901-04) under Scott, who so named it because of its shape.

=== Boulder Cones ===
77.807266°S 166.710021°E. A descriptive name for cones 0.9 nautical miles (1.7 km; 1.0 mi) southwest of Castle Rock. Named by Frank Debenham of the British Antarctic Expedition, 1910–13 (BrAE), who made a plane table survey of the peninsula in 1912.

=== Arrival Heights ===
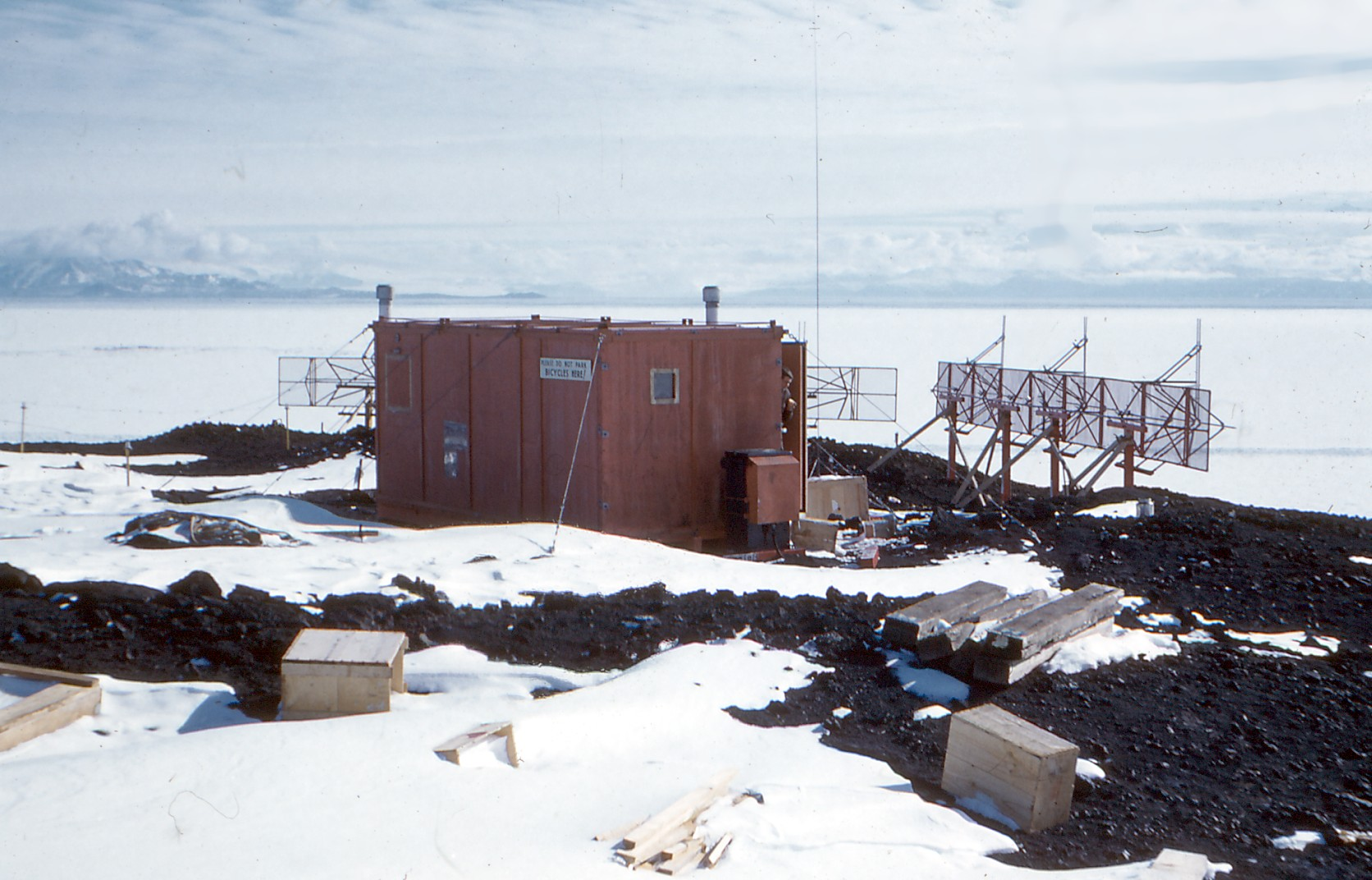
Auroral radar installed at Arrival Heights, circa 1959

77°49′S 166°39′E. Clifflike heights which extend in a NE--southwest direction along the west side of Hut Point Peninsula, just north of Hut Point. Discovered and named by the BrNAE, 1901-04, under Scott. The name suggests the expedition's arrival at its winter headquarters at nearby Hut Point.

=== Danger Slopes ===
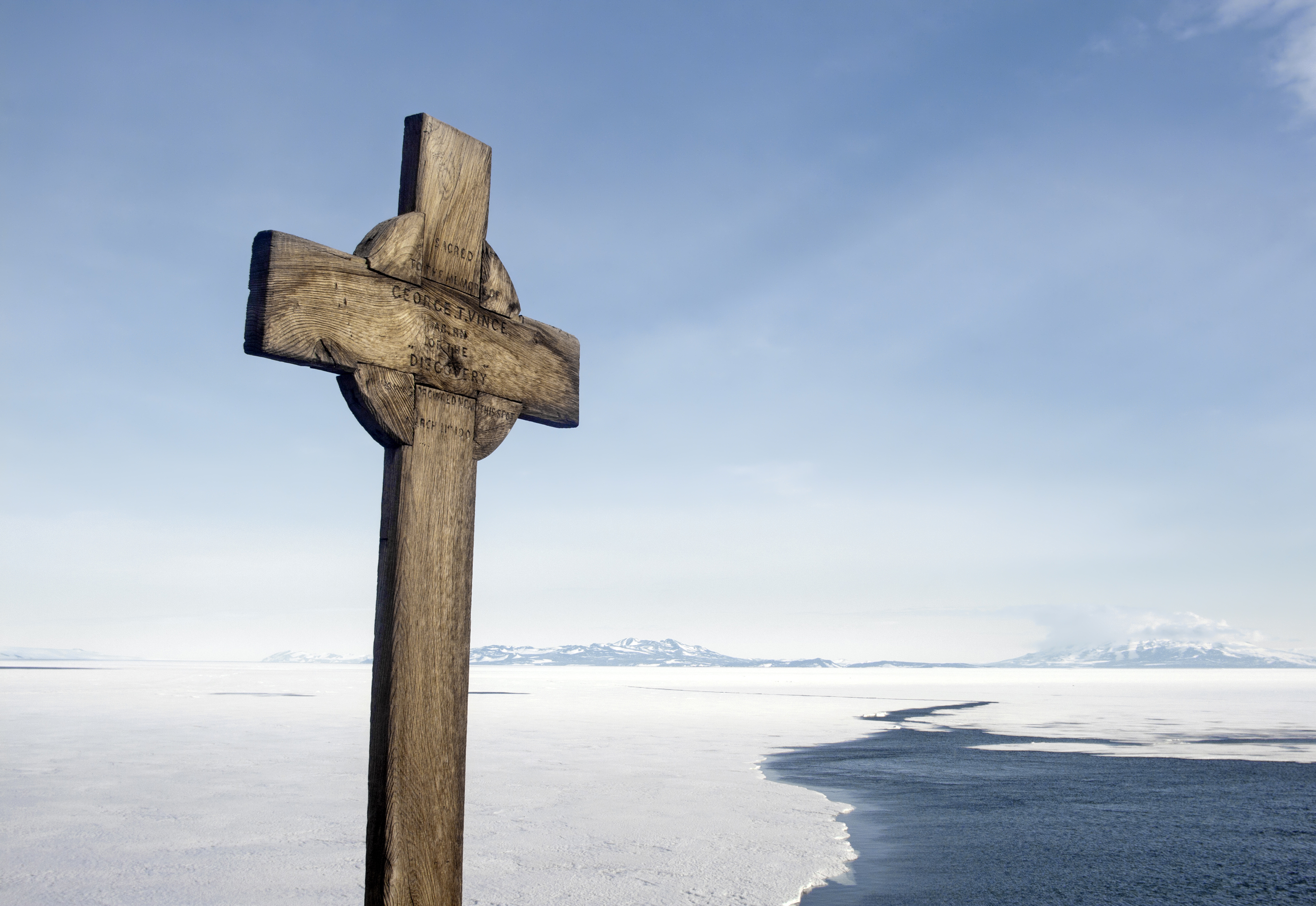
George Vince's Cross

77°49′S 166°40′E. An ice slope just south of Knob Point. The initial slope is very steep and it terminates west in a sheer drop to Erebus Bay. So named by BrNAE (1901-04) because Seaman Vince of BrNAE died here in a blizzard when he slipped and fell into the sea.

=== Starr Lake ===
77°50′S 166°40′E. A small meltwater lake which is a source of water for McMurdo Station. The lake is situated in the area of constant snow cover on Hut Point Peninsula, approximately 0.5 nautical miles (0.93 km; 0.58 mi) north of the station and midway between First Crater and Crater Hill. The name Starr Lake came into general use at McMurdo Station for this feature in the early 1970's. It is named after James W. Starr, steelworker, United States Navy, who was closely associated with the development of the lake as a source of station water.

=== Crater Hill ===
77°50′S 166°43′E. A hill, 300 metres (980 ft) high, marked by a volcanic crater at its summit, about 1 nautical mile (1.9 km; 1.2 mi) north of Observation Hill in the south part of Hut Point Peninsula. Discovered and named by the BrNAE under Scott, 1901-04.

=== Polar Bear Point ===
77.816287°S 166.851715°E. An ice-covered point 1.2 nautical miles (2.2 km; 1.4 mi) southeast of Castle Rock on the east side of Hut Point Peninsula. A breached crater stands 0.7 nautical miles (1.3 km; 0.81 mi) north-northwest, but no rock is exposed on the point which is well defined and elevated at the juncture with McMurdo Ice Shelf. The name is allusive; when viewed from the west, the appearance of the point is suggestive of the head, neck, and fore part of an Arctic polar bear. Named by the Advisory Committee on Antarctic Names (US-ACAN), 2000.

== Southern features ==
Features in the south of the peninsula, from west to east, include

=== Black Knob ===
77.838187°S 166.663478°E. A descriptive name for a rock outcrop 0.2 nautical miles (0.37 km; 0.23 mi) west of Twin Crater/Middle Crater. The name has been used in reports and maps since at least 1971.

=== Winter Quarters Bay ===
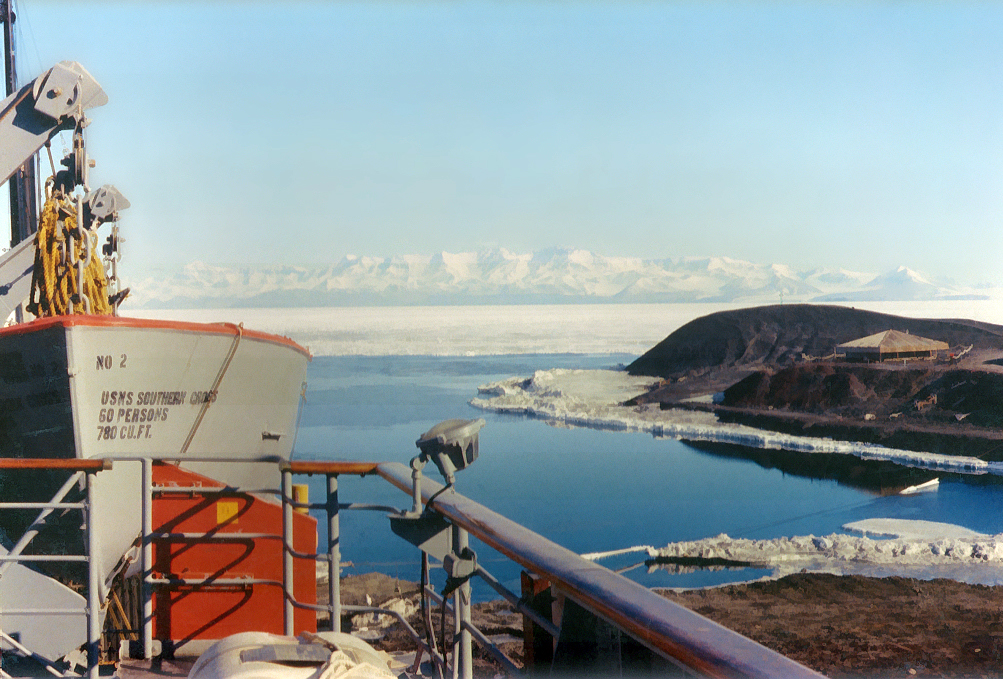
Prefabricated hut erected by the National Antarctic Discovery Expedition (1901-1904) adjacent to Winter Quarters Bay, middle right.

77°51′S 166°37′E. A small bay immediately east of Hut Point, at the south end of Ross Island. Discovered by the BrNAE, 1901-04, and so named because the expedition ship Discovery was moored in the bay and "frozen-in" during the winter seasons of 1902 and 1903.

=== Hut Point ===
77°51′S 166°38′E. A small point lying 1 nautical mile (1.9 km; 1.2 mi) northwest of Cape Armitage, at the south end of Hut Point Peninsula. Discovered and named by the BrNAE (1901-04) under Scott, who established their hut on the point.

=== Observation Hill ===
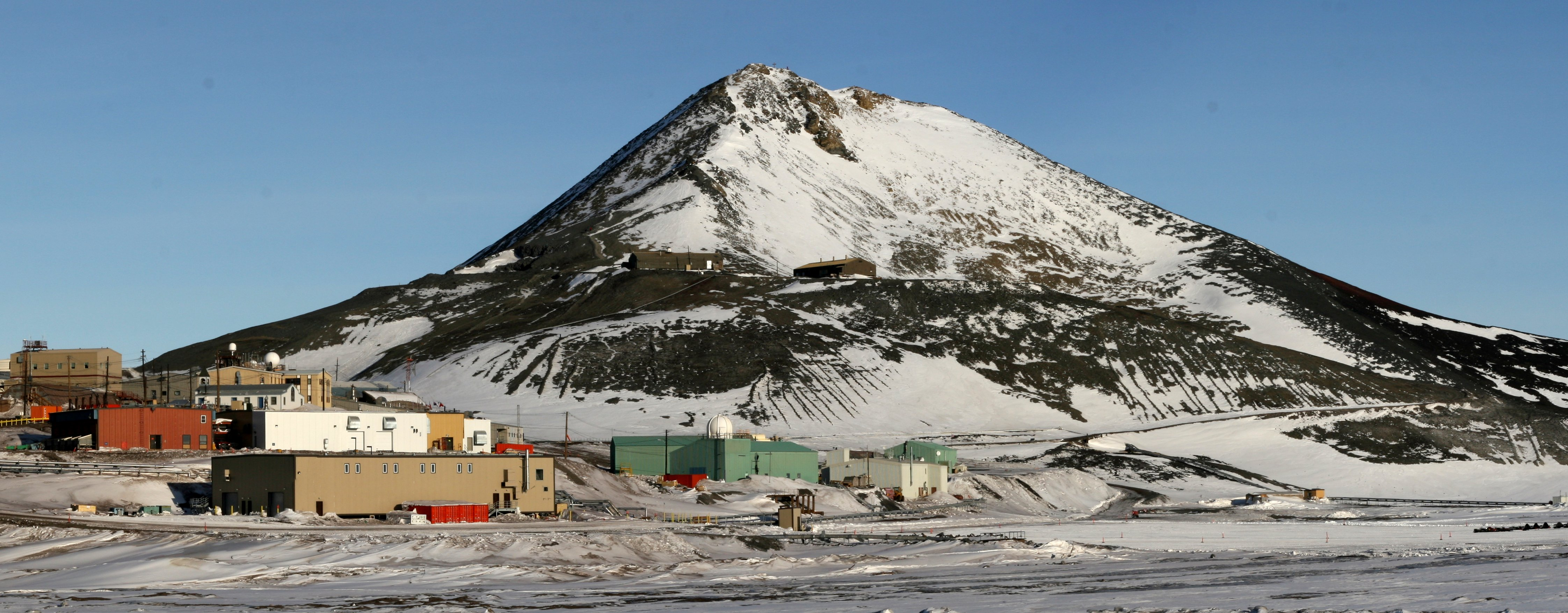
Observation Hill as seen from Hut Point

77°51′S 166°40′E. Conical hill, 230 metres (750 ft) high, surmounting Cape Armitage at the south end of Hut Point Peninsula. Discovered by the BrNAE, 1901-04, under Scott, and so named because it forms an excellent lookout station.

=== Cape Armitage ===
77°51′S 166°40′E. Cape forming the south end of Hut Point Peninsula and the southernmost point of Ross Island. Discovered by the BrNAE, 1901-04, under Scott, and named by him for Lieutenant (later Captain) Albert B. Armitage, second in command and navigator on the Discovery.

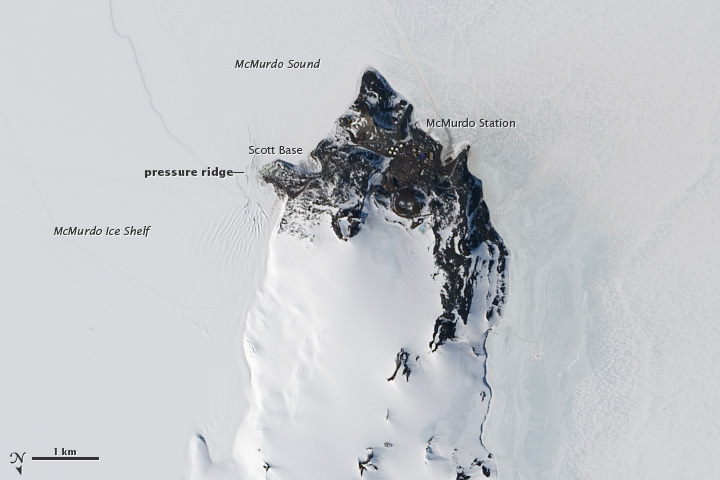
Annotated view over the Hut Peninsula with McMurdo, also showing Scott Base and the McMurdo Ice Shelf (south is up in this image)

=== Fortress Rocks ===
77°51′S 166°41′E. A cluster of low rock summits 0.5 nautical miles (0.93 km; 0.58 mi) north of the summit of Observation Hill on Hut Point Peninsula. A descriptive name given by members of the British Antarctic Expedition, 1910-13, under Scott.

=== The Gap ===
77°51′S 166°43′E. A pass between Crater Hill and Observation Hill at the south end of Hut Point Peninsula. Charted and named by the BrNAE, 1901-04, under Scott. BrNAE sledge parties traversed the south end of the peninsula via this low level passage.

=== Pram Point ===
77°51′S 166°45′E. Low rounded point on the southeast side of Hut Point Peninsula, about 1.5 nautical miles (2.8 km; 1.7 mi) northeast of Cape Armitage. Discovered by the BrNAE, under Scott, 1901-04, who so named it because it is necessary during the summer months to use a pram in the open water adjacent to the point when traveling between the south end of Hut Point Peninsula and the Ross Ice Shelf.

== Region around Hut Point Peninsula ==
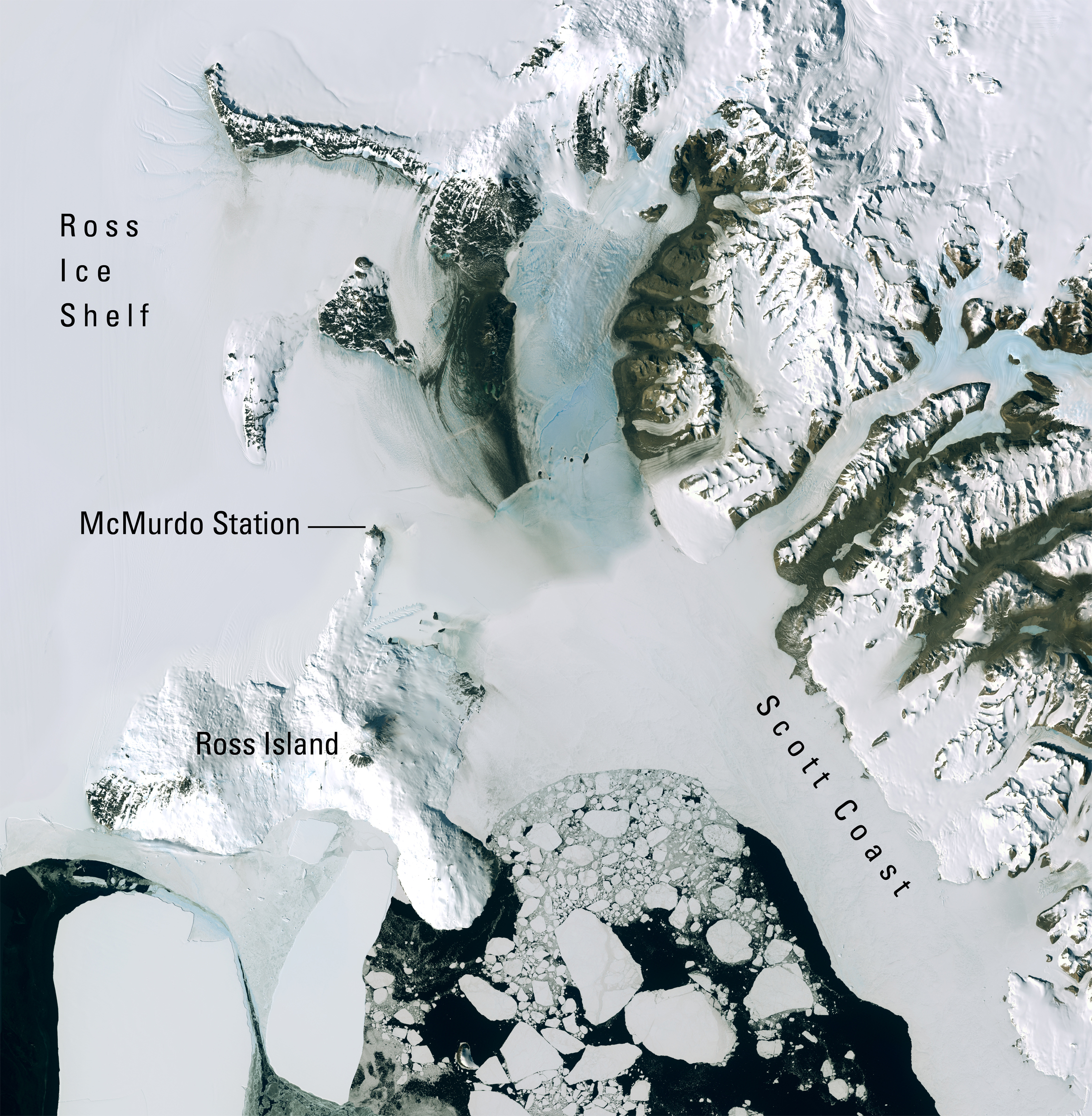
McMurdo Station (with Scott Base) lies at the tip of Hut Point Peninsula. (south is up)

== See also ==
- McMurdo Station transportation

== Sources ==
- "Ackley Point", Geographic Names Information System, United States Geological Survey, United States Department of the Interior
- Alberts, Fred G., ed. (1995), Geographic Names of the Antarctic (PDF) (2 ed.), United States Board on Geographic Names This article incorporates public domain material from websites or documents of the United States Board on Geographic Names.
- "Black Knob", Geographic Names Information System, United States Geological Survey, United States Department of the Interior
- "Boulder Cones", Geographic Names Information System, United States Geological Survey, United States Department of the Interior
- "Centipede Nunatak", Geographic Names Information System, United States Geological Survey, United States Department of the Interior
- "Half Moon Crater", Geographic Names Information System, United States Geological Survey, United States Department of the Interior
- "Polar Bear Point", Geographic Names Information System, United States Geological Survey, United States Department of the Interior
- "Rodgers Point", Geographic Names Information System, United States Geological Survey, United States Department of the Interior
- Ross Island, USGS: United States Geological Survey
- "Sheppard Crater", Geographic Names Information System, United States Geological Survey, United States Department of the Interior
- "Twin Crater", Geographic Names Information System, United States Geological Survey, United States Department of the Interior

This article incorporates public domain material from websites or documents of the United States Geological Survey.
