= South Polar Times =

The South Polar Times was a magazine created by the crew of the two Antarctic voyages led by Captain Robert Falcon Scott in the early 20th century: the Discovery Expedition (1901–04), and the Terra Nova Expedition (1910–13). It documents first-hand many professional and personal aspects of Antarctic exploration, and highlights some of the physical and psychological hardships the men suffered. It was established in part to entertain the crew, all of whom were offered the opportunity to contribute. The magazine combines watercolour paintings, cartoons, photographs with weather reports, essays, and other colloquial and scientific observations.

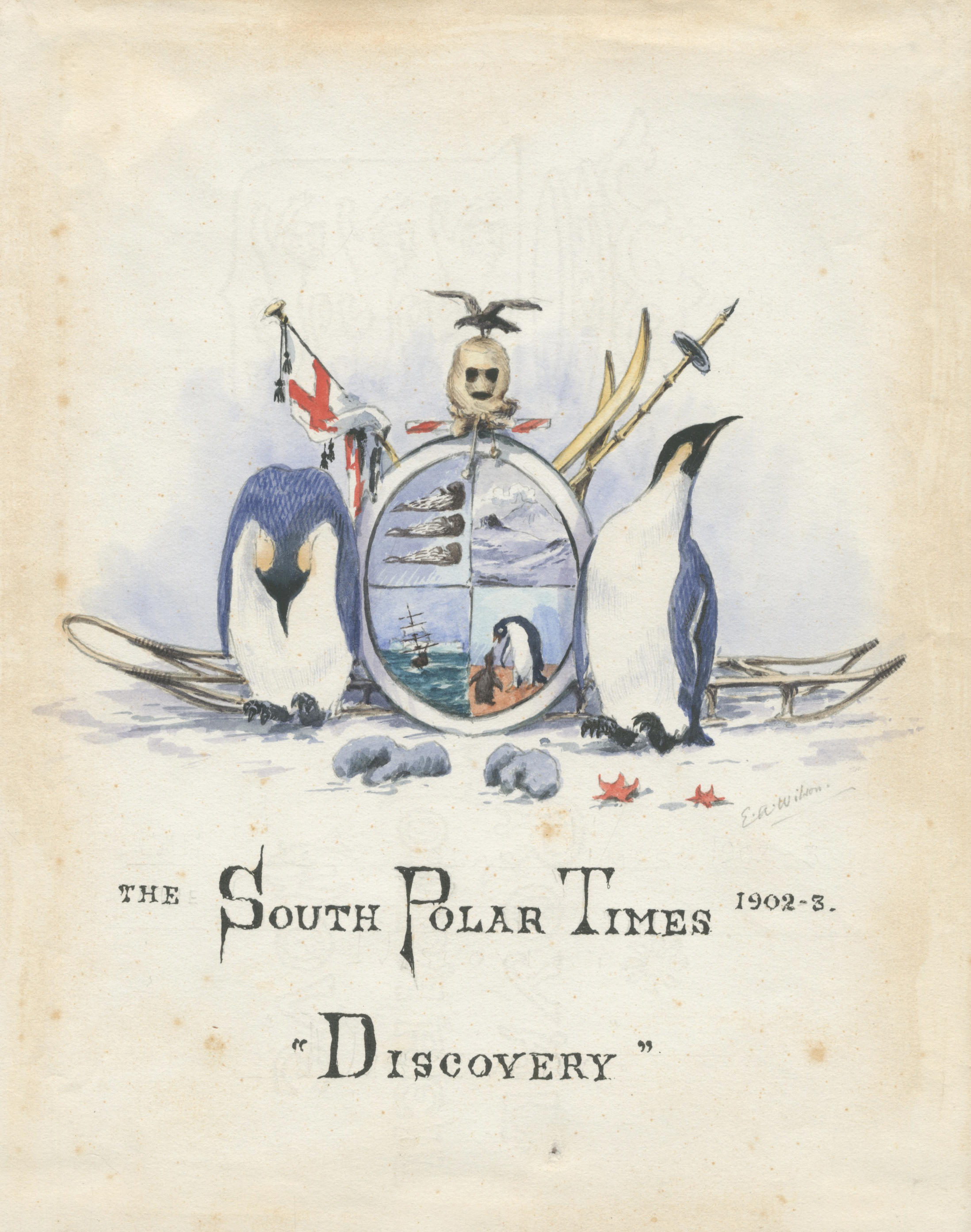
Title page of the first issue of South Polar Times.

Only one copy of each edition was originally printed. The twelve issues of the magazine are collected in four published volumes, and the Folio Society has published a complete edition.

== Founding purpose ==
The magazine was founded to provide an outlet to entertain the men throughout their time in Antarctica and keep them occupied when weather prevented exploration. Through habitual recording of stories and events, the magazine offers insight into daily Antarctic life. In his journal, Scott writes about the perfect initial copy of the magazine, but acknowledges that in the circumstances, broad circulation would not be possible from their isolated location in Antarctica. The crew therefore endeavoured to reproduce the magazine for the public upon returning from Antarctica.

The magazine was mostly produced in the months of May through to August. In these winter months, sunlight in Antarctica is scarce and often in mid-winter (June) the sun does not rise. Each completed issue of the magazine was read aloud to all men on the expedition upon the completion of each contributor's work. Illustrations were created by hand and all text was generated on typewriters in order that the magazine featured various perspectives and generated broad discussion. The magazine gives various accounts of the complex problems encountered by Scott, such as the weather, boredom, lack of resources and isolation.

== Final edition ==
The final edition of the series was produced in 1912 on the ‘Terra Nova' expedition. At this point, the men who were writing for the magazine were depleted of supplies at the Ross Island Hut. The winter of 1912 in Antarctica was marked by the death of Scott and several other members of his expedition party. The 12th edition encapsulates these events figuratively, stating that "beauty is linked to tragedy" in documenting the lifestyle in Antarctica. Although ‘Scott of the Antarctic' died attempting to reach the South Pole, no explicit reference to this event is made in the magazine. His body was found eight months later. Other men who perished included Edgar Evans, Lawrence Oates, Edward Wilson and Birdie Bowers. The magazine does not comment on these deaths either.

== Content and style ==
The style of the magazine is colloquial and recounts the extreme conditions suffered in Antarctica. Creating the memento became a traditional means of gathering in community, therefore strict editing and censorship did not apply. The article has been described by historians as a creation at the "crossroads of art and science". This interpretation offered by Michael Bartalos of the California Academy of Science is influenced by the fact that the publication was a single typewritten copy accompanied by detailed diagrams for aesthetic results.

Scott explained in his preface of the first edition in 1902 that the men "knew that daylight would shortly disappear for four whole months", and consequently, the thoughts of expedition members turned to the long dark period ahead. Ultimately, this foreword frames the magazine as a means by which the men could lighten the winter's monotony." In the preface, Scott also proposed that the format should follow a mixed approach. Scott states that scientists contributions should be about their special subjects and scientific events of general interest. Lighter matter such as humorous anecdotes and poems was also encouraged. Illustrations of the landscape and wildlife also make up a substantial aspect of the magazine. A key contributor of these illustrations was the chief of scientific staff, Edward Wilson, who was an experienced artist. Wilson's notable roles on the expeditions was that of junior surgeon and zoologist. The extent of his artistry is exemplified by the fact that Wilson's created over two hundred sketches that feature in the South Polar Times.

An example of the written work included in the South Polar Times is an entry titled ‘Extracts from some Antarctic Archives', which is satirical in nature. It recounts the ‘barkinofdogs' and ‘neighinof horses' around the men's base. The excerpt also uses hieroglyphics. The magazine resembles a casual tone as the recounts are often told first hand. For example, segments of the publication are titled ‘Events of the month' and offer stories such as ‘April 6: An exciting seal chase' , ‘April 11: His Majesty the King became Patron of the Expedition' and ‘April 13: Windmill collapsed.' The variation of the works in the magazine extended to skits by Griffith Taylor who composed ‘Valhalla.' Further, a common activity to pass time in the winter that is revealed in the South Polar Times is the composition of sonnets – a popular format of poetry in the Edwardian period. A diary is also kept alongside the South Polar Times which describes the types of events conducted on a monthly basis. It offers insight into the Local Debating Society competition. Other events that are documented include the monthly acrostic. Insights of personal value such as nicknames can be located in the South Polar Times. For example, the expedition's chief doctor is referred to as ‘Cutlets' throughout the publishment rather than his actual name, Reginald Koettlitz.

The South Polar Times also includes a number of photographs. The photographer was Herbert Ponting and he developed his work with equipment set up on both the huts and ships. Footage includes photographs of the transantarctic mountains and the expedition ships.

== Mainstream production ==
The Folio Society has published a complete edition of all original issues of the expedition magazine. The reason the Folio Society engaged in mainstream production was to publish the fourth volume of The South Polar Times for the first time. This final volume was created during the winter of 1912.

The production of this final volume also acts as a companion to volumes I, II and III which were published in London in 1907 and 1914 upon the return of the ‘Discovery' and ‘Terra Nova' expeditions respectively. The centenary edition which holds the first three volumes was originally reprinted in London by Smith, Elder & Co. It is printed on one side of leaf only. It only includes the first three volumes and is regarded as periodical material. The first two volumes consisted of 250 copies each, and the third edition was made up of 350 copies.

The modern Folio Society edition was published with the resources of the Royal Geographical Society and the British Library. It is bound in printed cloth. The pages are reprinted in the same dimensions as the original journal (11" x 8 ¼ "). It was reproduced to fulfil Scott's vision that the South Polar Times' audience would grow beyond the men on the expedition and transcend time. The Folio edition includes an introduction specifically curated by Ann Savours Shirley, who is an expert in historical polar publishing. The introduction describes the editorial process and the eventual publication. The front cover of this edition uses the same watercolour painting by Wilson as the cover of the 1902 cover. The front piece is an artistic work of three men hauling a sledge. Some of Wilsons notable works include the armorial title page which shows two emperor penguins framing a shield. The shield is an impression of Mt Erebus. Although Wilson was the principal illustrator, officers and crew often contributed in creating illustrations to be published alongside poems and other written work.

In the preface of the first edition, Scott provides some context for future readers by stating that "Owners of these volumes will possess an exact reproduction of the original South Polar Times." No explanatory notes accompany any editions of Scott's Antarctic journal. The sole edification of the end product ensures that readers are provided with the same experience as the men who created the original copy of the South Polar Times.

== Editors and contributors ==
Over the course of the magazine's creation, three key figures were effectively editors. The original editor was Ernest Shackleton. Shackleton's editorship of the South Polar Times has been described as "natural" as he "had a fondness for literature." Whilst editor, Shackleton also contributed substantially with original verses and writings. From 1903, Louis Bernacchi played a central role as editor. Since Bernacchi had substantial scientific knowledge, information recorded in the South Polar Times was drawn upon in subsequent presentations given globally. In Scott's 1911 expedition, Apsley Cherry-Garrard edited the third edition but did not publish it until 1914. Although specific roles were assigned to particular members of Scott's Antarctic expeditions, it is noted in the preface to the first edition that a central condition of the production relied on the notion that it was to be open to all and that "the men as well as the officers were to be invited to contribute to its pages."

Also noted by some researchers of the South Polar Times is the fact that the success of this publication was a likely impetus for the printing of the Aurora Australis publication in 1908.

== Access to wider audiences ==
The South Polar Times is focused on the human aspect of Polar exploration. It is held by numerous public libraries worldwide. Libraries in Australia, New Zealand, the UK, the US hold copies for members of the public to access and is most often held in the rare books collection. Although the item is accessible to read, it must often be requested in advance and viewed in the library's reading rooms. Furthermore, some copies are listed as fragile material and therefore cannot be used by the public. In such circumstances, libraries such as the National Library of Australia offer a microform copy.

Various videos and voiceovers have also been published online which include details about the various essays included in the South Polar Times, such as ‘Physical Observations being conducted in the Winter Quarters and the purpose of such investigations.' Footage of the primary source is evident in this content and shares the men's observations with a wider audience. As the magazine contains information with reference to maps, plans and diagrams, readers can be both entertained and informed about the conditions in Antarctica.

The copyright status of the South Polar Times is also an important factor in the ability for publishing houses to print extensive copies of the test. For example, in Australia, the magazine is protected under copyright until 2029. This copyright status is determined by the fact that the presumed death of the latest creator was 1959 plus 70 years.

== Cultural significance ==
The South Polar Times is reflective of the shift from commercial exploitation to scientific exploration in Antarctica. The renewed interest in science is reflected by editor Bernacci's statement that "Antarctic exploration is of capital importance to science". Those who conducted such research offer another perspective in the South Polar Times. The emotive language employed by the contributors adds a layer of struggle to the period of Antarctic exploration. Scott expresses the fact that after each volume was completed, it was "held fast in the Antarctic Ice." The harsh conditions of exploration are recounted in a segment of the publishment which tells the story of the disappearance of one man in the sledging party after a blizzard occurred.

The scientific findings that are dispersed throughout the South Polar Times are reflective of the substantial contributions the expeditions made to meteorology, magnetism, geology and biology. Further, of all the 400 total pages on such content, almost every text is accompanied by an illustration. The South Polar Times has been described as a literary work that has never been equalled in similar conditions.
