= Albert Armitage =

Scottish polar explorer (1864–1943)

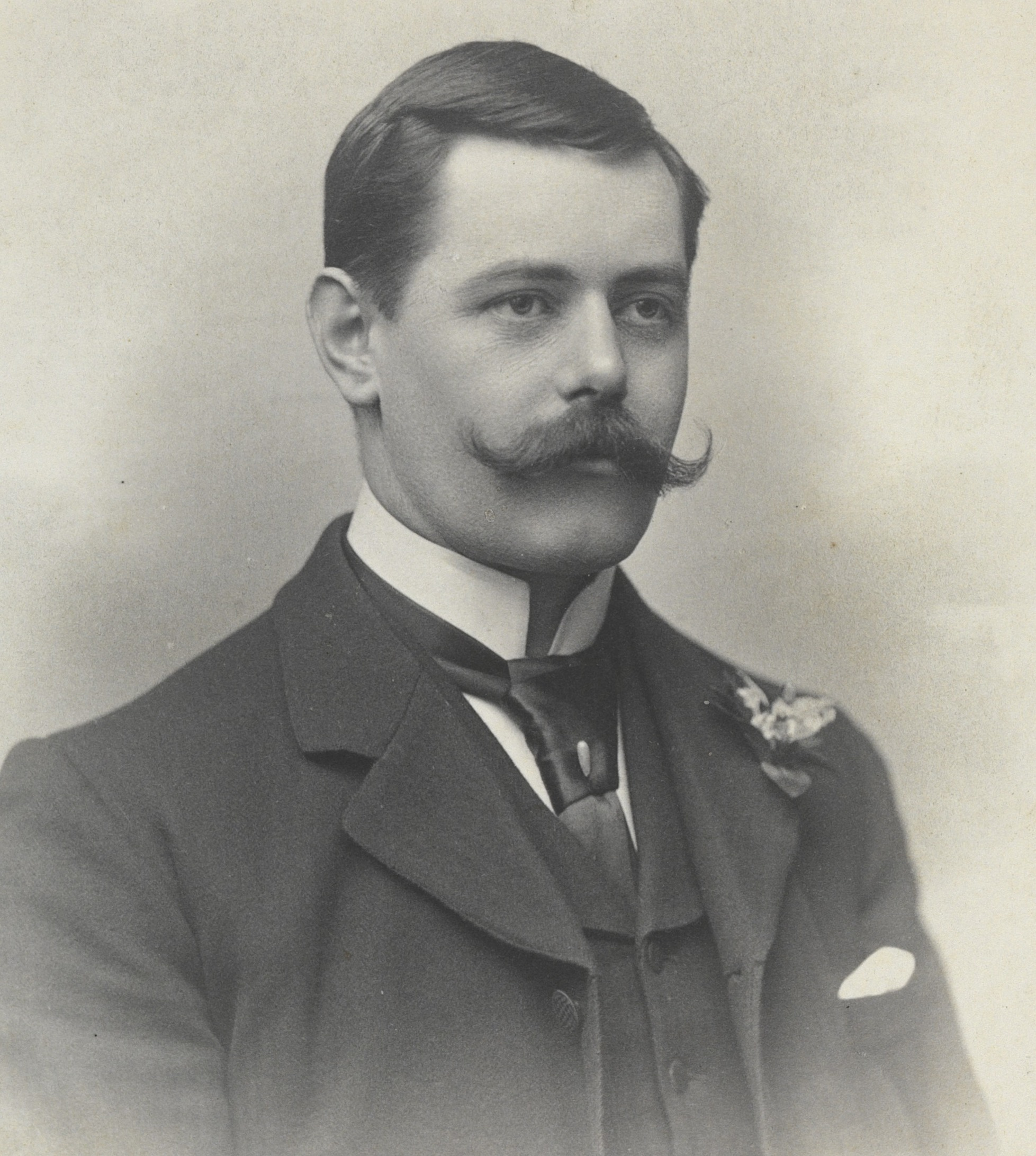
- Born: Albert Borlase Armitage; 2 July 1864; Balquhidder, Scotland
- Died: 31 October 1943 (aged 79); Surrey, England
- Military career
- Branch: Royal Navy
- Years of service: 1878–1886

Albert Borlase Armitage (2 July 1864 – 31 October 1943) was a Scottish polar explorer and officer in the Merchant Navy.

== Early life ==
Armitage was born in Balquhidder, near Loch Lubnaig in Perthshire on 2 July 1864. He was one of eight children to Samuel Harris Tatham Armitage, a Yorkshire doctor, and Alice (Lees) Armitage.

In 1878 Armitage enlisted as a cadet aboard the Royal Navy's training ship, HMS Worcester, which was moored at the time in the River Thames near Greenhithe. At the conclusion of basic training he attempted to resign from the Navy and seek a position with P&O, but was prevented from doing so by his father. Instead, Armitage was signed on as an apprentice aboard the former Indian Navy frigate Punjaub, now owned by the East India Company. He sailed with Punjaub to Calcutta, where he transferred to another Company vessel, the Lucknow, as Third Mate.

After seven years as a company sailor, Armitage again sought parental consent to join P&O. Approval was received and in 1886 Armitage was appointed Fifth Officer aboard the P&O passenger ship Bokhara.

== Polar exploration ==
Between 1894 and 1897, he was second-in-command, of the Jackson–Harmsworth expedition to Franz Josef Land, and was involved in the 1895 rescue of explorer Fridtjof Nansen and his men.

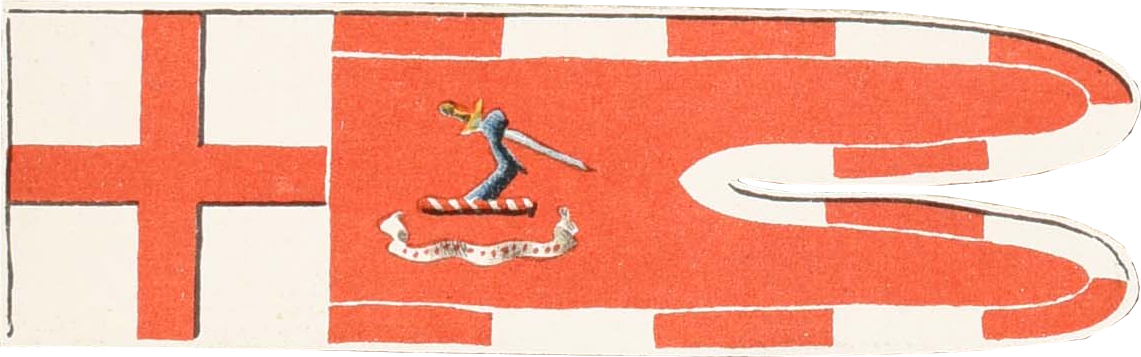
Sledge flag used by Armitage in Antarctica during the Discovery Expedition

Armitage was then Robert Falcon Scott's navigator and second-in-command on the Discovery Expedition to Antarctica. The other members were Ernest Shackleton, George Mulock, Edward Adrian Wilson, Charles Royds, Frank Wild, Koettlitz, Skelton, Heald, Barne, Plumley, Quartley, Weller, Hare, Allen, Evans, Ferrar, Hodgson, Louis Bernacchi, Vince. On this expedition, he became the first person to walk on the polar plateau.

Armitage got on very well with Scott during the preparations for the voyage and his RNR rank of lieutenant ensured that he was made second in command of the Discovery expedition. However, he later fell out with Scott and claimed that he and Markham failed to honour a number of promises they had made and on his return to Britain Armitage was paid off by the expedition and it took him nearly nine months to find an appointment with P & O.

== Post-Antarctic ==
On his return to the UK he filled in his time by writing "Two Years in the Antarctic" (Edward Arnold, 1905). A row followed with Scott's publishers because Scott's "Discovery Expedition" didn't come out until after Armitage's book. However, according to Armitage, he was at sea when this happened and he and Scott later met up for lunch "and all was sunshine." They never met again.

Eventually he was given his own command, the Royal Mail Steamer "Isis", carrying mails between Brindisi and Port Said. This was the story of his life until retirement, carrying passengers and mails on "little ferry boats" across the Mediterranean and later, in command of the "Salsette" between Bombay and Aden, living for many years away from England with his family in Brindisi and Malta. Toward the end of the First World War the "Salsette" was torpedoed in the English Channel with a loss of 14 crew. Armitage was then given command of the "Karmala" which was used to transporting cargo and U.S. and Canadian troops across the Atlantic and, later, for repatriating Australian soldiers.

His last command was the 11,000 ton mail steamer the "Mantua" on the Bombay to China run. After over 40 years at sea he was appointed Commodore of P&O and, by the company rules, required to retire at the age of 60 years, just one year later. In 1928 he published "Cadet To Commodore", an autobiography with only a few passing references to the Scott Expedition.

Armitage was married with a single daughter who married a naval lieutenant. His wife died, possibly in Malta, before World War I after a period of ill-health. He died in Surrey on 31 October 1943 aged 79.

Armitage's diaries of his time in the Antarctic were sold at auction for £36,000 in 2004 in two lots to a single buyer.

== Bibliography ==
- Walton, D. W. H. (May 1985). "Profile: Albert Borlase Armitage". Polar Record. 22 (140): 511–518. doi:10.1017/S0032247400005969. S2CID 129402259.
