= Discovery Expedition =

British scientific expedition to Antarctica (1901 to 1904)

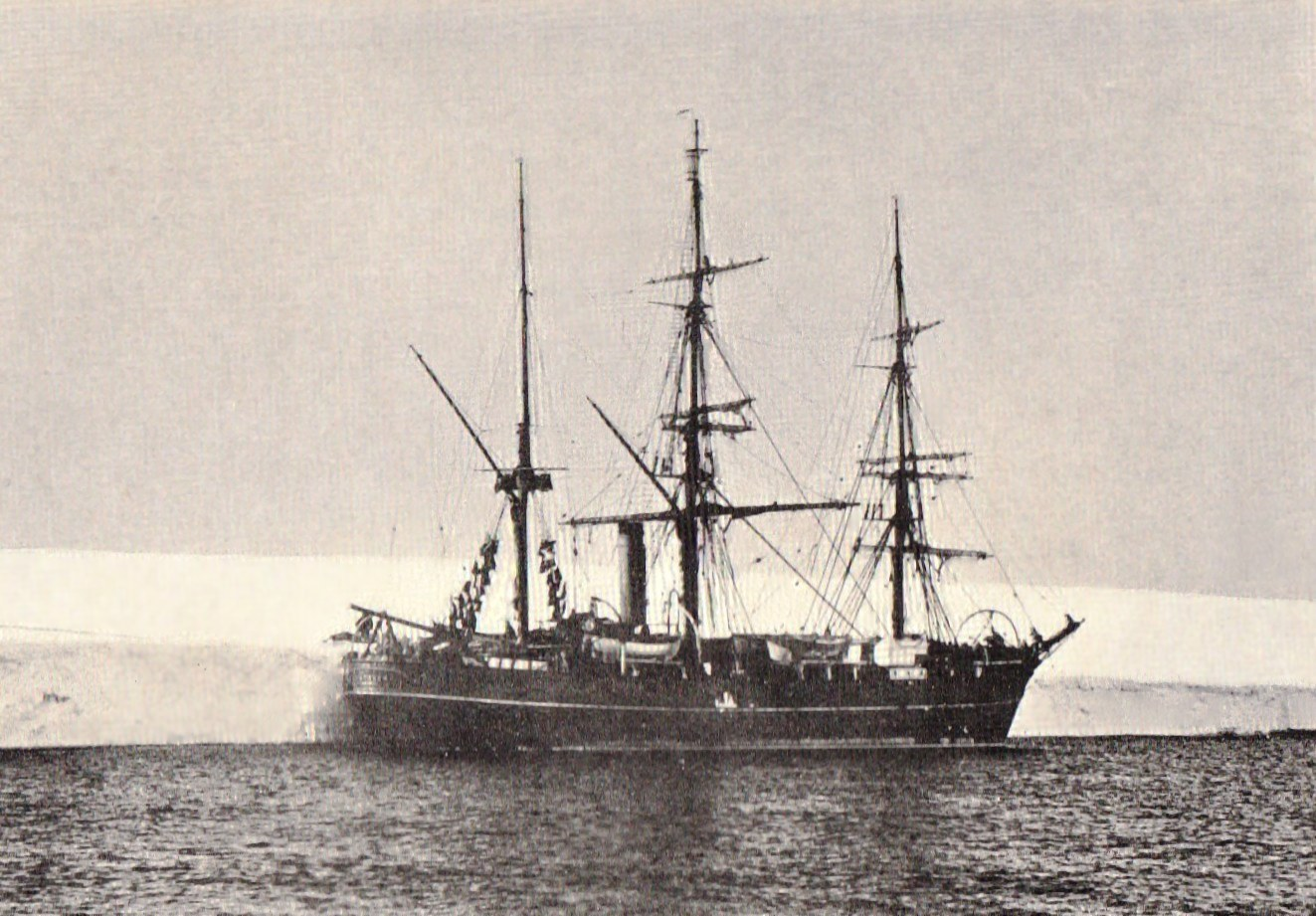
The expedition ship RRS Discovery in the Antarctic alongside the Great Ice Barrier, now known as the Ross Ice Shelf

The Discovery Expedition of 1901–1904, known officially as the British National Antarctic Expedition, was the first official British exploration of the Antarctic regions since the voyage of James Clark Ross sixty years earlier (1839–1843). Organized on a large scale under a joint committee of the Royal Society and the Royal Geographical Society (RGS), the new expedition carried out scientific research and geographical exploration in what was then largely an untouched continent. It launched the Antarctic careers of many who would become leading figures in the Heroic Age of Antarctic Exploration, including Robert Falcon Scott who led the expedition, Ernest Shackleton, Edward Wilson, Frank Wild, Tom Crean and William Lashly.

Its scientific results covered extensive ground in biology, zoology, geology, meteorology and magnetism. The expedition discovered the existence of the only snow-free Antarctic valleys, which contains the longest river of Antarctica. Further achievements included the discoveries of the Cape Crozier emperor penguin colony, King Edward VII Land, and the Polar Plateau (via the western mountains route) on which the South Pole is located. The expedition tried to reach the South Pole travelling as far as the Farthest South mark at a reported 82°17′S.

As a trailbreaker for later ventures, the Discovery Expedition was a landmark in British Antarctic exploration history.

== Background to the expedition ==
=== Forerunners ===
Between 1839 and 1843 Royal Naval Captain James Clark Ross, commanding his two ships HMS Erebus and HMS Terror, completed three voyages to the Antarctic continent. During this time he discovered and explored a new sector of the Antarctic that would provide the field of work for many later British expeditions.

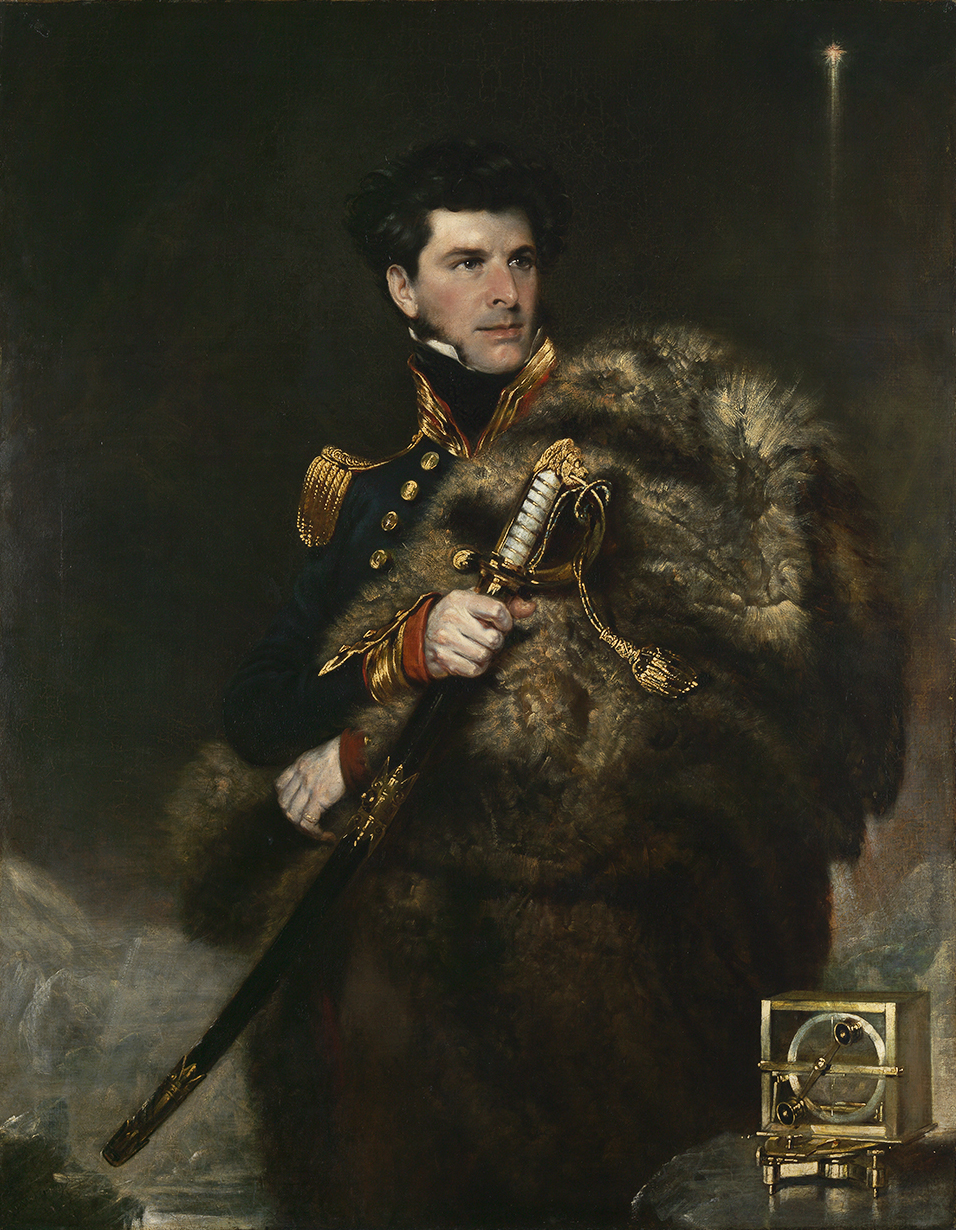
Sir James Clark Ross, discoverer of the Ross Sea, the Ross Ice Shelf and McMurdo Sound

Ross established the general geography of this region, and named many of its features; the Ross Sea, the Great Ice Barrier (later renamed the Ross Ice Shelf), Ross Island, Cape Adare, Victoria Land, McMurdo Sound, Cape Crozier and the twin volcanoes Mount Erebus and Mount Terror. He returned to the Barrier several times, hoping to penetrate it, but was unable to do so, achieving his Farthest South in a small Barrier inlet at 78°10′, in February 1842. Ross suspected that land lay to the east of the Barrier, but was unable to confirm this. (Note: Captain Scott's instructions, as leader of the 1901 Discovery Expedition, required him to "discover the land which as believed by Ross to flank the barrier to the eastward". Savours, pp. 16–17.)

After Ross there were no recorded voyages into this sector of the Antarctic for fifty years. Then, in January 1895, a Norwegian whaling trip made a brief landing at Cape Adare, the northernmost tip of Victoria Land. Four years later Carsten Borchgrevink, who had participated in that landing, took his own expedition to the region, in the Southern Cross. This expedition was financed by a donation of £35,000 from British publishing magnate Sir George Newnes, on condition that the venture be called the "British Antarctic Expedition". Borchgrevink landed at Cape Adare in February 1899, erected a small hut, and spent the 1899 winter there. The following summer he sailed south, landing at Ross's inlet on the Barrier. A party of three then sledged southward on the Barrier surface, and reached a new Furthest South at 78°50′.

The Discovery Expedition was planned during a surge of international interest in the Antarctic regions at the turn of the 19th and 20th centuries. At the 7th International Geographical Congress in Berlin, Sir Clements Markham presented the idea of a joint procedure in Antarctica with the planned German expedition under Erich von Drygalski. Furthermore Drygalski proposed the idea of an international cooperation, similar to the International Polar Year 1882-1883, which was unanimously passed. Apart from the British and German expedition, the Swedish expedition under Otto Nordenskjöld was also part of the international cooperation, as was the Scottish expedition led by William Speirs Bruce.

=== Royal Navy, Markham and Scott ===
Under the influence of John Barrow, Second Secretary to the Admiralty, polar exploration had become the province of the peacetime Royal Navy after the Napoleonic War. Naval interest diminished after the disappearance in 1845 of the Franklin expedition, and the many fruitless searches that followed. After the problems encountered by the 1874–76 North Pole expedition led by George Nares, and Nares's own declaration that the North Pole was "impracticable", the Admiralty decided that further polar quests would be dangerous, expensive and futile.

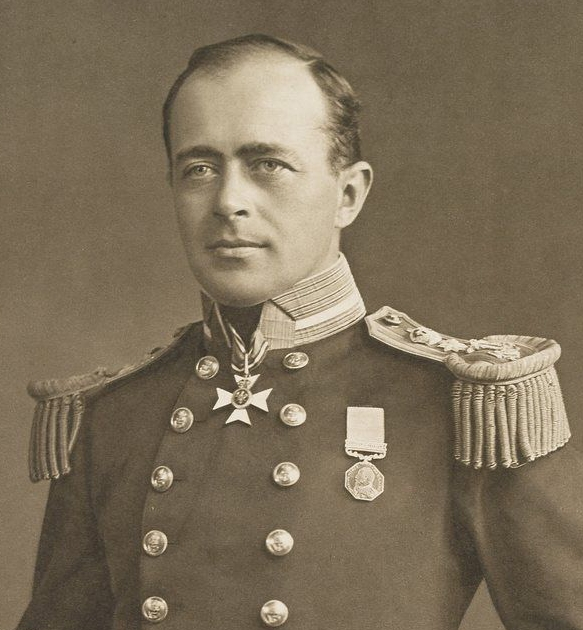
Captain Robert Falcon Scott, appointed leader of the Discovery Expedition

However, the Royal Geographical Society's secretary (and later president) Sir Clements Markham was a former naval man who had served on one of the Franklin relief expeditions in 1851. He had accompanied Nares for part of the 1874–76 expedition, and remained a firm advocate for the navy's resuming its historic role in polar exploration. An opportunity to further this ambition arose in November 1893, when the prominent biologist Sir John Murray, who had visited Antarctic waters as a biologist with the Challenger Expedition in the 1870s, addressed the RGS. Murray presented a paper entitled "The Renewal of Antarctic Exploration", and called for a full-scale expedition for the benefit of British science. This was strongly supported, both by Markham and by the country's premier scientific body, the Royal Society. A joint committee of the two societies was established to decide the form in which the expedition should take. Markham's vision of a full-blown naval affair after the style of Ross or Franklin was opposed by sections of the joint committee, but his tenacity was such that the expedition was eventually moulded largely to his wishes. His cousin and biographer later wrote that the expedition was "the creation of his brain, the product of his persistent energy".

It had long been Markham's practice to take note of promising young naval officers who might later be suitable for polar responsibilities, should the opportunity arise. He had first observed Midshipman Robert Falcon Scott in 1887, while the latter was serving with HMS Rover in St Kitts, and had remembered him. Thirteen years later, Scott, by now a torpedo lieutenant on HMS Majestic, was looking for a path to career advancement, and a chance meeting with Sir Clements in London led him to apply for the leadership of the expedition. Scott had long been in Markham's mind, though by no means always his first choice, but other favoured candidates had either become in his view too old, or were no longer available. With Markham's determined backing, Scott's appointment was secured by 25 May 1900, followed swiftly by his promotion to commander.

=== Science versus adventure ===
The command structure of the expedition had still to be settled. Markham had been determined from the beginning that its overall leader should be a naval officer, not a scientist. Scott, writing to Markham after his appointment, reiterated that he "must have complete command of the ship and landing parties", and insisted on being consulted over all future appointments. However, the Joint Committee had, with Markham's acquiescence, secured the appointment of John Walter Gregory, Professor of Geology at the University of Melbourne and former assistant geologist at the British Museum, as the expedition's scientific director. Gregory's view, endorsed by the Royal Society faction of the Joint Committee, was that the organisation and command of the land party should be in his hands: "...The Captain would be instructed to give such assistance as required in dredging, tow-netting etc., to place boats where required at the disposal of the scientific staff." In the dispute that followed, Markham argued that Scott's command of the whole expedition must be total and unambiguous, and Scott himself was insistent on this to the point of resignation. Markham's and Scott's view prevailed, and Gregory resigned, saying that the scientific work should not be "subordinated to naval adventure".

This controversy soured relations between the Societies, which lingered after the conclusion of the expedition and was reflected in criticism of the extent and quality of some of the published results. Markham claimed that his insistence on a naval command was primarily a matter of tradition and style, rather than indicating disrespect for science. He had made clear his belief that, on its own, the mere attainment of higher latitude than someone else was "unworthy of support."

== Personnel ==
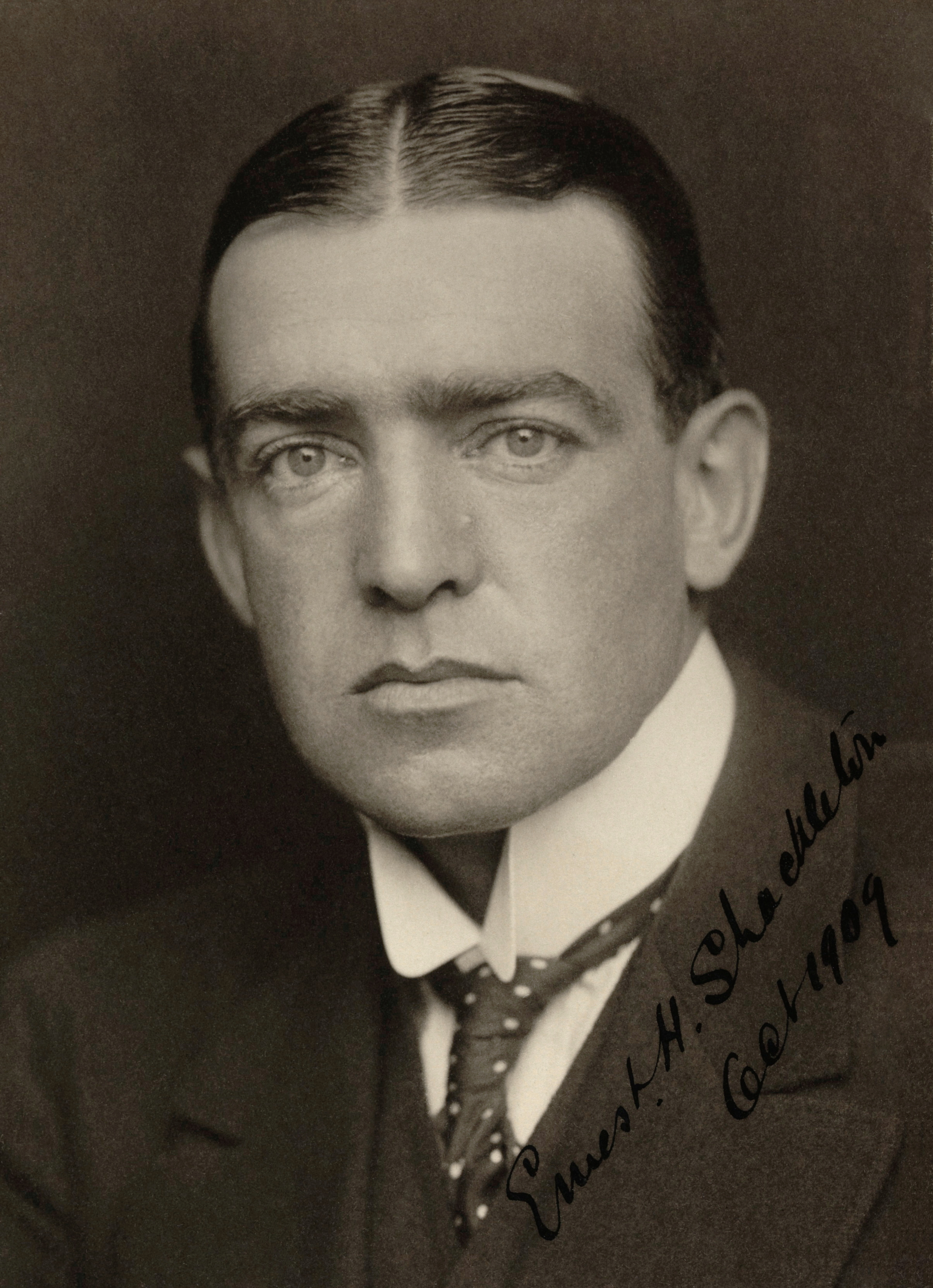
Ernest Shackleton, Third Officer on the Discovery

Markham had hoped for a fully fledged Royal Naval expedition, but was warned by the Admiralty that "the present exigencies of the Naval Service [would] prevent them from lending officers..." However, the Admiralty agreed to release Scott and Charles Royds, and later allowed Michael Barne and Reginald Skelton to join the expedition. The remaining officers were from the Merchant Marine, including Albert Armitage, the second-in-command, who had experience with the Jackson–Harmsworth Arctic expedition, 1894–97, and Ernest Shackleton, designated Third Officer in charge of holds, stores and provisions, and responsible for arranging the entertainments. The Admiralty also released around twenty petty officers and seamen, the rest of the crew being from the merchant service, or from civilian employment. (Note: The complete crew list is given in Savours, p. 19.) Among the lower deck complement were some who became Antarctic veterans, including Frank Wild, William Lashly, Thomas Crean (who joined the expedition following the desertion of a seaman in New Zealand), Edgar Evans and Ernest Joyce. Although the expedition was not a formal Navy project, Scott proposed to run the expedition on naval lines, and secured the crew's voluntary agreement to work under the Naval Discipline Act.

The scientific team was inexperienced. Dr George Murray, Gregory's successor as chief scientist, was due to travel only as far as Australia (in fact he left the ship at Cape Town), using the voyage to train the scientists, but with no part to play in the detailed work of the expedition. The only scientist with previous Antarctic experience was Louis Bernacchi, who had been with Borchgrevink as magnetic observer and meteorologist. The geologist, Hartley Ferrar, was a 22-year-old recent Cambridge graduate who Markham thought "might be made into a man." Marine biologist Thomas Vere Hodgson, from Plymouth Museum, was a more mature figure, as was the senior of the two doctors, Reginald Koettlitz, who, at 39, was the oldest member of the expedition. He, like Armitage, had been with the Jackson–Harmsworth expedition. The junior doctor and zoologist was Edward Wilson, who became close to Scott and provided the qualities of calmness, patience and detachment that the captain reportedly lacked.

== Organisation and objectives ==
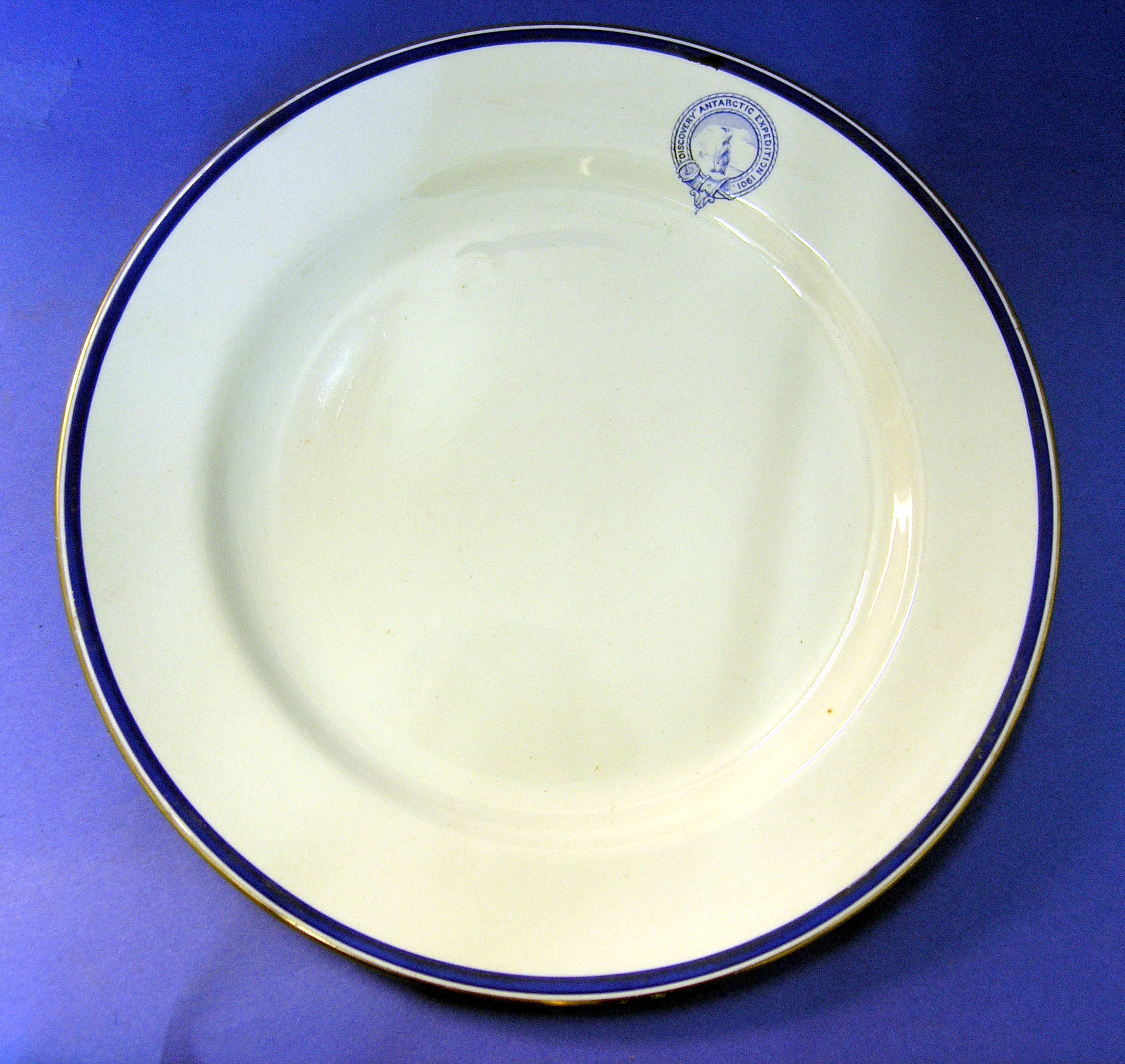
Royal Doulton bone china plate from the expedition, marked "'DISCOVERY' ANTARCTIC EXPEDITION 1901" around a penguin. Brought back by C. Reginald Ford.

=== Finance ===
The total cost of the expedition was estimated at £90,000 (2009 equivalent about £7.25 million), of which £45,000 was offered by the British Government provided that the two Societies could raise a matching sum. Lord Curzon and Edward Somers Cocks, Treasurer of the society played important roles in the finance of the expedition. Thanks largely to a donation of £25,000 from wealthy RGS member Llewellyn W. Longstaff. The RGS itself contributed £8,000, its largest single contribution to any expedition to date, and £5,000 came from Alfred Harmsworth, later Lord Northcliffe, who had earlier financed the Jackson–Harmsworth expedition to the Arctic, 1894–97. The rest was raised from smaller donations. The expedition also benefited from significant commercial sponsorship: Colman's provided mustard and flour, Cadbury's gave 3,500 lb (1,600 kg) of chocolate, Bird's donated baking and custard powders, Evans, Lescher & Webb provided all the lime juice. Jaeger gave a 40% discount on special clothing, Bovril supplied beef extract, and others made significant contributions.

=== Ship ===
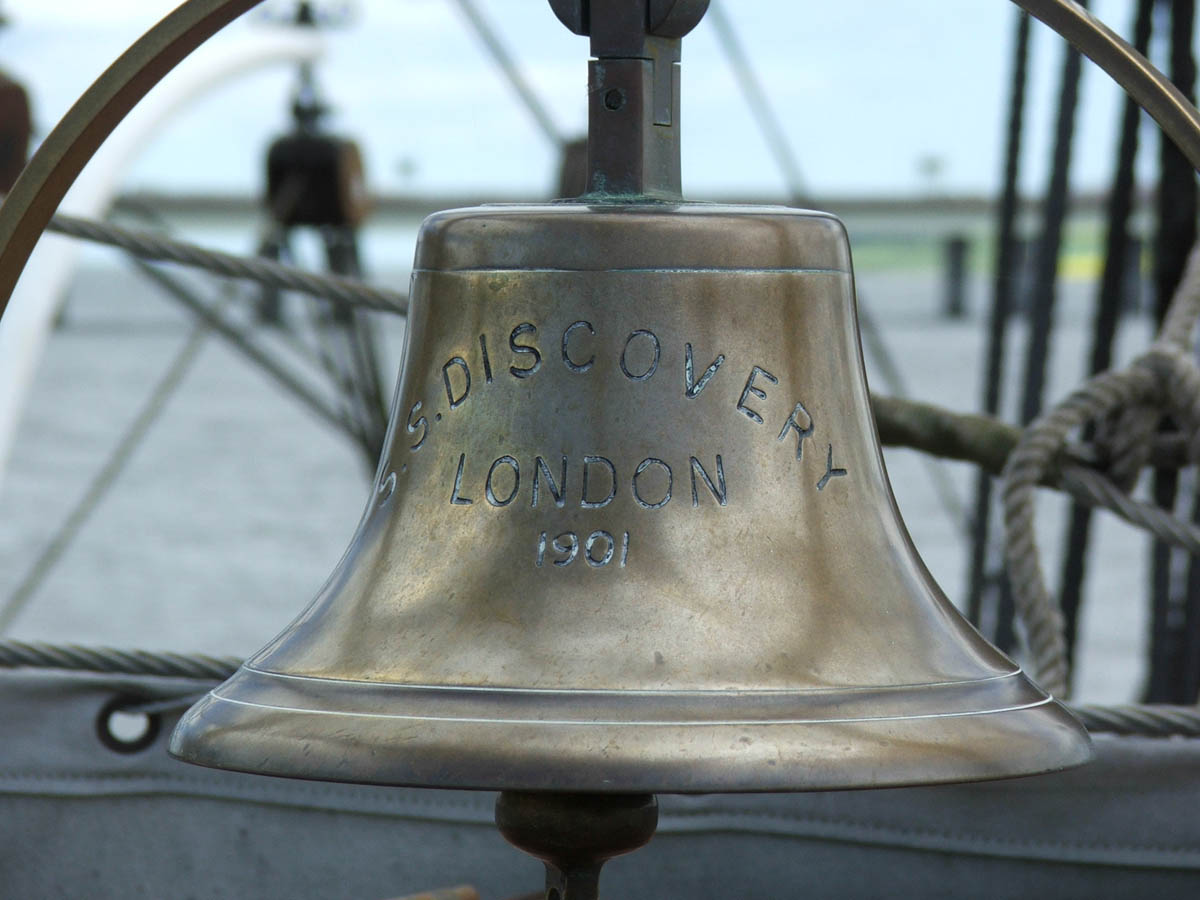
The ship's bell of SS Discovery

The expedition's ship was built by the Dundee Shipbuilders Company as a specialist research vessel designed for work in Antarctic waters, and was one of the last three-masted wooden sailing ships built in Britain. The construction cost was £34,050 (2009 = £2.7 million), plus £10,322 (£830,000) for the engines, and the final cost after all modifications was £51,000 (£4.1 m). The name had historic naval associations, most recently as one of the ships used in the Nares expedition, and certain features of this older vessel were incorporated into the design of the new ship. She was launched by Lady Markham on 21 March 1901 as S.Y. Discovery (the Royal Research Ship designation was acquired in the 1920s). The ship was fitted with special ventilating equipment, which reflected the importance of clean air within medical theories in this period.

As she was not a Royal Naval vessel the Admiralty would not allow Discovery to fly the White Ensign. She eventually sailed under the Merchant Shipping Act, flying the RGS house flag and the Blue Ensign and burgee of the Royal Harwich Yacht Club.

=== Dogs ===
Scott contacted Fridtjof Nansen in Kristiania (now Oslo), whom he trusted more than his own "quarrelling" committee in London, and followed his advice on equipment. Subsequently, Armitage ordered 25 Siberian sledge-dogs via a Scots dog and ski expert based in Archangel, Russia. According to Huntford, however, this expert was not invited to join the expedition.

=== Objectives ===
The Discovery Expedition, like those of Ross and Borchgrevink before it, was to work in the Ross Sea sector of Antarctica. Other areas of the continent had been considered, but the principle followed was that "in going for the unknown they should start from the known". The two main objectives of the expedition were summarised in the joint committee's "Instructions to the Commander" as: "to determine, as far as possible, the nature, condition and extent of that portion of the south polar lands which is included in the scope of your expedition", and "to make a magnetic survey in the southern regions to the south of the fortieth parallel and to carry out meteorological, oceanographic, geological, biological and physical investigations and researches". The instructions stipulated that "neither of these objectives was to be sacrificed to the other".

The instructions concerning the geographical objective became more specific: "The chief points of geographical interest are [...] to explore the ice barrier of Sir James Ross to its eastern extremity; to discover the land which was believed by Ross to flank the barrier to the eastward, or to ascertain that it does not exist [...] If you should decide to winter in the ice...your efforts as regards geographical exploration should be directed to [...] an advance to the western mountains, an advance to the south, and an exploration of the volcanic region".

== Expedition ==
=== First years ===
==== Outward journey ====
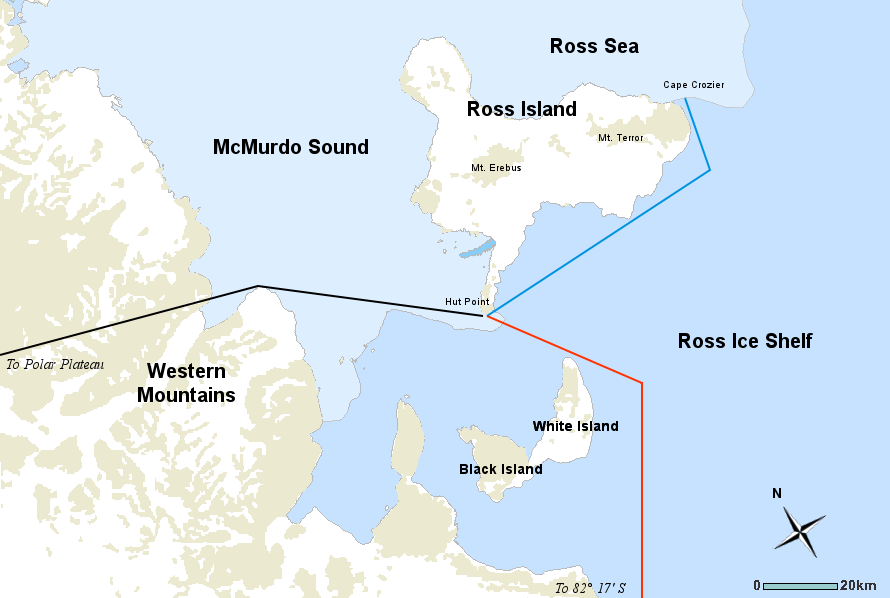
Farthest South, November 1902 – February 1903 Polar Plateau, October–December 1903 Cape Crozier, October 1902; September–October 1903.

Discovery left Cowes on 6 August 1901, and arrived in New Zealand via Cape Town on 29 November after a detour below 40°S for a magnetic survey. Quail Island in Lyttelton Harbour was used as the quarantine station for the expedition's dogs. After three weeks of final preparation she was ready for the journey south. On 21 December, as the ship was leaving Lyttelton to the cheers of large crowds, a young able seaman, Charles Bonner, fell to his death from the top of the mainmast, which he had climbed so as to return the crowd's applause. He was buried at Port Chalmers, two days later.

Discovery then sailed south, arriving at Cape Adare on 9 January 1902. After a brief landing and examination of the remains of Borchgrevink's camp, the ship continued southwards along the Victoria Land coast. At McMurdo Sound Discovery turned eastward, touching land again at Cape Crozier where a pre-arranged message point was set up so that relief ships would be able to locate the expedition. She then followed the Barrier to its eastern extremity where, on 30 January, the land predicted by Ross was confirmed, and named King Edward VII Land.

On 4 February, Scott landed on the Barrier and unpacked an observation balloon which he had acquired for aerial surveys. Scott climbed aboard and rapidly ascended to above 600 feet (180 m) in the firmly tethered balloon. Shackleton followed with a second flight. All either could see was unending Barrier surface. Wilson privately thought the flights "perfect madness".

==== Winter Quarters Bay ====
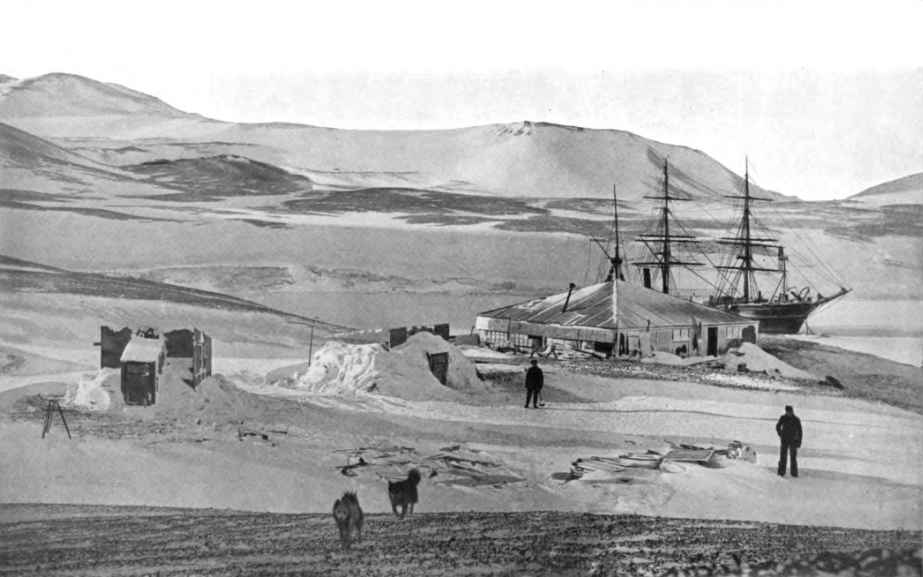
General view of the huts

Discovery then proceeded westward in search of permanent quarters. On 8 February she entered McMurdo Sound and later that day anchored in a spot near its southern limit which was afterwards christened Winter Quarters Bay. Wilson wrote: "We all realized our extreme good fortune in being led to such a winter quarter as this, safe for the ship, with perfect shelter from all ice pressure." Stoker Lashly, however, thought it looked "a dreary place." Work began ashore with the erection of the expedition's huts on a rocky peninsula designated Hut Point. Scott had decided that the expedition should continue to live and work aboard ship, and he allowed Discovery to be frozen into the sea ice, leaving the main hut to be used as a storeroom and shelter.

Of the entire party, none were skilled skiers and only Bernacchi and Armitage had any experience with dog-sledges. The results of the men's early efforts to master these techniques were not encouraging, and tended to reinforce Scott's preference for man-hauling. The dangers of the unfamiliar conditions were confirmed when, on 11 March, a party returning from an attempted journey to Cape Crozier became stranded on an icy slope during a blizzard. In their attempts to find safer ground, one of the group, Able Seaman George Vince, slid over the edge of a cliff and was killed. His body was never recovered; a cross with a simple inscription, erected in his memory, still stands at the summit of the Hut Point promontory.

During the winter months of May–August the scientists were busy in their laboratories, while elsewhere equipment and stores were prepared for the next season's work. For relaxation there were amateur theatricals, and educational activities in the form of lectures. A newspaper, the South Polar Times, was edited by Shackleton. Outside pursuits did not cease altogether; there was football on the ice, and the schedule of magnetic and meteorological observations was maintained. As winter ended, trial sledge runs resumed, to test equipment and rations in advance of the planned southern journey which Scott, Wilson and Shackleton were to undertake. Meanwhile, a party under Royds travelled to Cape Crozier to leave a message at the post there, and discovered an emperor penguin colony. Another group, under Armitage, reconnoitred in the mountains to the west, returning in October with the expedition's first symptoms of scurvy. Armitage later blamed the outbreak on Scott's "sentimental objection" to the slaughter of animals for fresh meat. The entire expedition's diet was quickly revised, and the trouble was thereafter contained. Nevertheless, the scurvy outbreak did cause concern about the expedition's safety when news of it reached Britain, leading to demands for a relief expedition. For instance, The Yorkshire Evening Post claimed that 'the lives of the gallant explorers and scientific staff of the Discovery may actually be in peril if they have to stay out for another winter.'

==== Southern journey ====
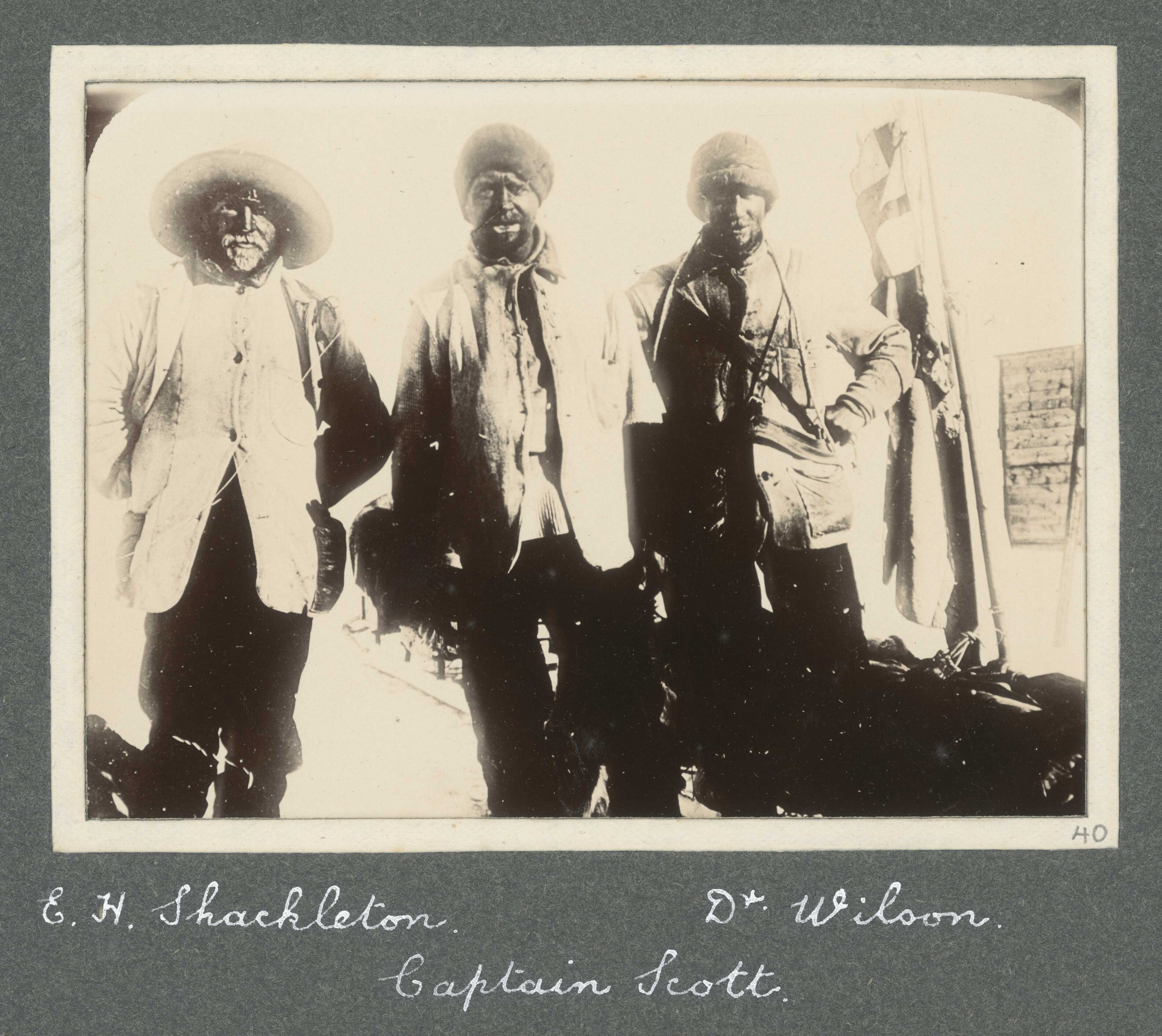
Shackleton, Scott and Wilson on 3 February 1903, on their return from the attempt to reach the South Pole

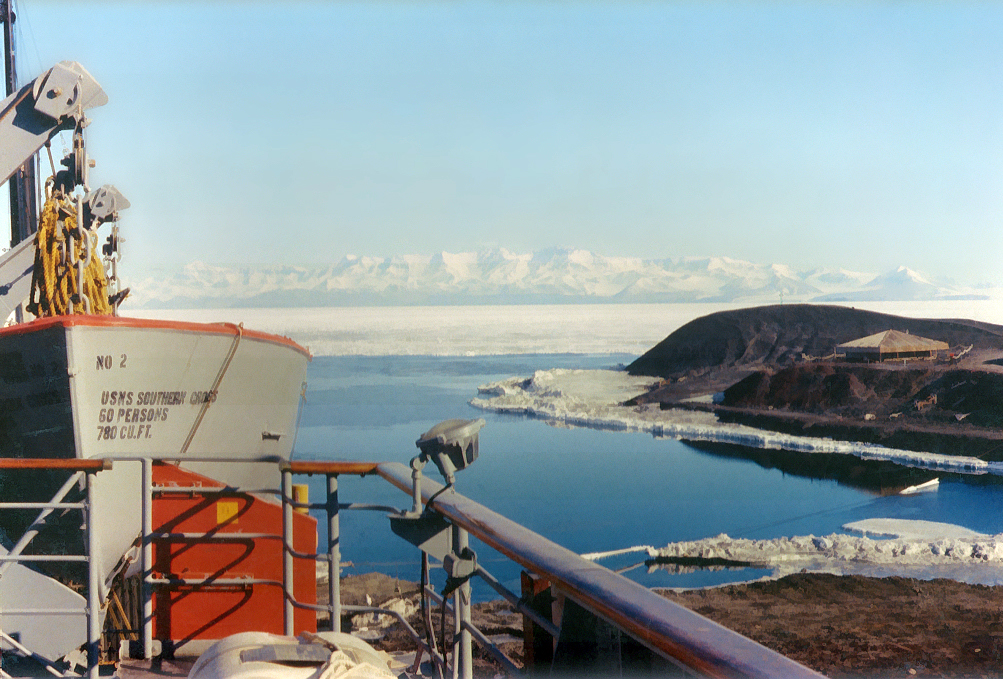
A modern photograph of the Discovery's old anchorage in Winter Quarters Bay, McMurdo Sound, alongside the Hut Point hut in the right background

Scott, Wilson and Shackleton left on 2 November 1902 with dogs and supporting parties. Their goal was "to get as far south in a straight line on the Barrier ice as we can, reach the Pole if possible, or find some new land". The first significant milestone was passed on 11 November, when a supporting party passed Borchgrevink's Farthest South record of 78°50′. However, the lack of skill with dogs was soon evident, and progress was slow. After the support parties had returned, on 15 November, Scott's group began relaying their loads (taking half loads forward, then returning for the other half), thus travelling three miles for every mile of southward progress. Mistakes had been made with the dogs' food, and as the dogs grew weaker, Wilson was forced to kill the weakest as food for the others. The men, too, were struggling, afflicted by snow blindness, frostbite and symptoms of early scurvy, but they continued southwards in line with the mountains to the west. Christmas Day was celebrated with double rations, and a Christmas pudding that Shackleton had kept for the occasion, hidden with his socks. On 30 December 1902, without having left the Barrier, they reached their Furthest South at 82°17′S. (Note: Modern calculations of the position, based on photographs, suggest that the latitude reached was 82° 11′. Crane, pp. 214–15 and Fiennes, p. 98.) Troubles multiplied on the home journey, as the remaining dogs died and Shackleton collapsed with scurvy. Wilson's diary entry for 14 January 1903 acknowledged that "we all have slight, though definite symptoms of scurvy". Scott and Wilson struggled on, with Shackleton, who was unable to pull, walking alongside and occasionally carried on the sledge. The party eventually reached the ship on 3 February 1903 after covering 960 miles (1,540 km) including relays, in 93 days' travel at a daily average of just over 10 miles (16 km).

=== Arrival of relief ship ===
During the southern party's absence the relief ship Morning arrived, bringing fresh supplies. The expedition's organisers had assumed that the Discovery would be free from the ice in early 1903, enabling Scott to carry out further seaborne exploration and survey work before winter set in. It was intended that Discovery would return to New Zealand in March or April, then home to Britain via the Pacific, continuing its magnetic survey en route. Morning would provide any assistance that Scott might require during this period.

This plan was frustrated, as Discovery remained firmly icebound. Markham had privately anticipated this, and Morning's captain, William Colbeck, was carrying a secret letter to Scott authorising another year in the ice. This now being inevitable, the relief ship provided an opportunity for some of the party to return home. Among these, against his will, was the convalescent Shackleton, who Scott decided "ought not to risk further hardships in his present state of health". Stories of a Scott-Shackleton rift date from this point, or from a supposed falling-out during the southern journey which had provoked an angry exchange of words. Some of these details were supplied by Armitage, whose relationship with Scott had broken down and who, after Scott, Wilson and Shackleton were all dead, chose to reveal details which tended to show Scott in a poor light. Other evidence indicates that Scott and Shackleton remained on generally good terms for some while; Shackleton met the expedition on its return home in 1904, and later wrote a very cordial letter to Scott.

=== Second year ===
After the 1903 winter had passed, Scott prepared for the second main journey of the expedition: an ascent of the western mountains and exploration of the interior of Victoria Land. Armitage's reconnaissance party of the previous year had pioneered a route up to altitude 8,900 feet (2,700 m) before returning, but Scott wished to march west from this point, if possible to the location of the South Magnetic Pole. After a false start due to faulty sledges, a party including Scott, Lashly and Edgar Evans set out from Discovery on 26 October 1903.

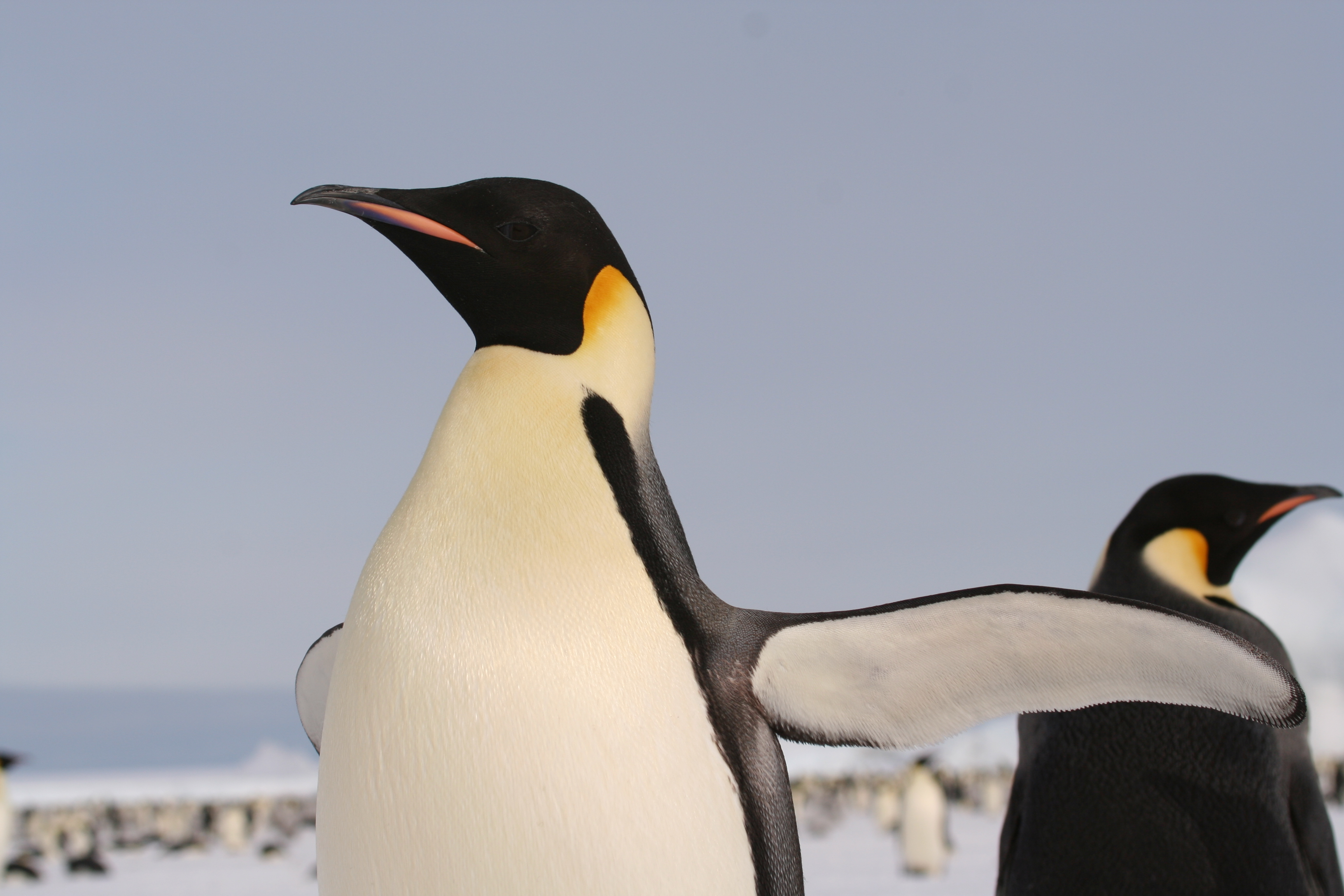
Emperor penguins. The colony at Cape Crozier had been discovered by a party led by Charles Royds, in October 1902.

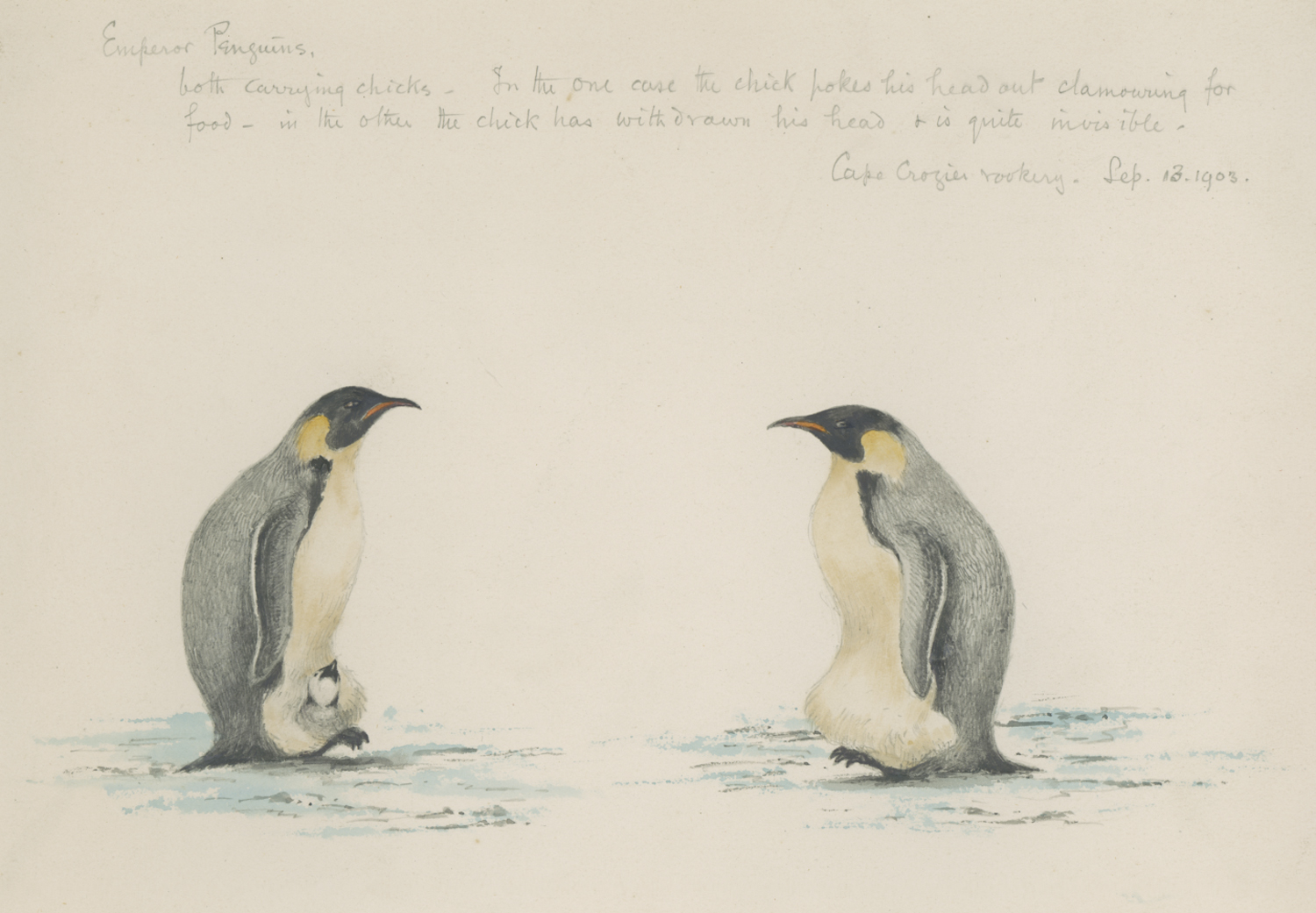
Drawing of two emperor penguins with chicks by Wilson (Sept. 1903)

Ascending the Ferrar Glacier, which they named after the party's geologist, they reached a height of 7,000 feet (2,100 m) before being held in camp for a week by blizzards. This prevented them from reaching the glacier summit until 13 November. They then marched on beyond Armitage's furthest point, discovered the Polar Plateau and became the first party to travel on it. After the return of geological and supporting parties, Scott, Evans and Lashly continued westward across the featureless plain for another eight days, covering a distance of about 150 miles to reach their most westerly point on 30 November. Having lost their navigational tables in a gale during the glacier ascent, they did not know exactly where they were, and had no landmarks to help them fix a position. The return journey to the Ferrar Glacier was undertaken in conditions which limited them to no more than a mile an hour, with supplies running low and dependent on Scott's rule of thumb navigation. On the descent of the glacier Scott and Evans survived a potentially fatal fall into a crevasse, before the discovery of a snow-free area or dry valley, a rare Antarctic phenomenon. Lashly described the dry valley as "a splendid place for growing spuds". The party reached Discovery on 24 December, after a round trip of seven hundred miles covered in 59 days. Their daily average of over 14 miles on this man-hauling journey was significantly better than that achieved with dogs on the previous season's southern journey, a fact which further strengthened Scott's prejudices against dogs. Polar historian David Crane calls the western journey "one of the great journeys of polar history".

Several other journeys were completed during Scott's absence. Royds and Bernacchi travelled for 31 days on the Barrier in a SE direction, observing its uniformly flat character and making further magnetic readings. Another party had explored the Koettlitz Glacier to the south-west, and Wilson had travelled to Cape Crozier to observe the emperor penguin colony at close quarters.

=== Second relief expedition ===
Scott had hoped on his return to find Discovery free from the ice, but she remained held fast. Work had begun with ice saws, but after 12 days' labour only two short parallel cuts of 450 feet (140 m) had been carved, with the ship still 20 miles (32 km) from open water. On 5 January 1904 the relief ship Morning returned, this time with a second ship, the Terra Nova. Colbeck was carrying firm instructions from the Admiralty that, if Discovery could not be freed by a certain date she was to be abandoned and her complement brought home on the two relief ships. This ultimatum resulted from Markham's dependence on the Treasury for meeting the costs of this second relief expedition, since the expedition's coffers were empty. The Admiralty would foot the bill only on their own terms. The deadline agreed between the three captains was 25 February, and it became a race against time for the relief vessels to reach Discovery, still held fast at Hut Point. As a precaution Scott began the transfer of his scientific specimens to the other ships. Explosives were used to break up the ice, and the sawing parties resumed work, but although the relief ships were able to edge closer, by the end of January Discovery remained icebound, two miles (approx. 3 km) from the rescuers. On 10 February Scott accepted that he would have to abandon her, but on 14 February most of the ice suddenly broke up, and Morning and Terra Nova were at last able to sail alongside Discovery. A final explosive charge removed the remaining ice on 16 February, and the following day, after a last scare when she became temporarily grounded on a shoal, Discovery began the return journey to New Zealand.

== Homecoming and results ==
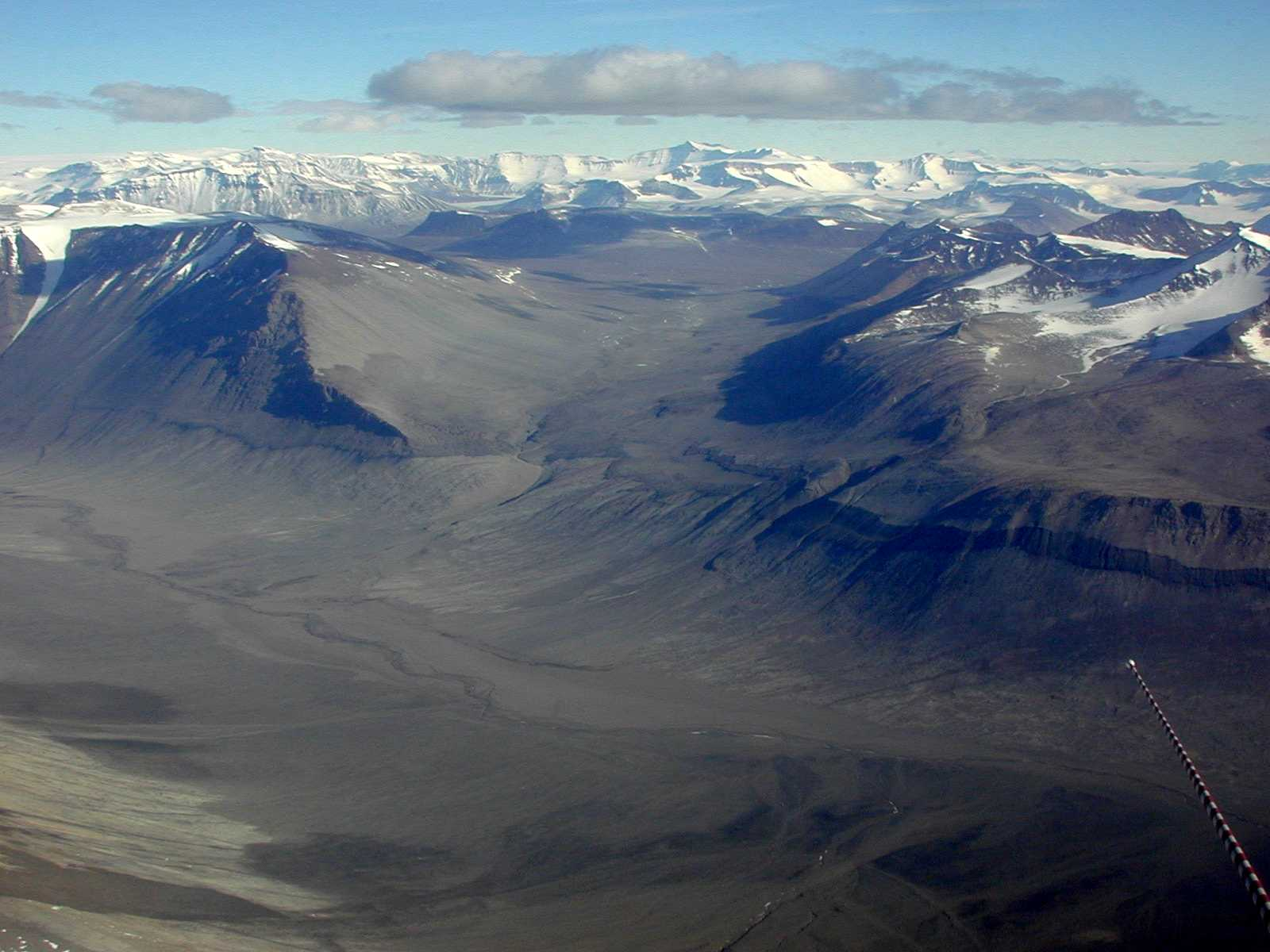
The Dry Valleys in the western mountains of Victoria Land, discovered during the expedition's western journey.

On its return to Britain, the expedition's reception was initially muted. Some press reporters were surprised at the good physical condition of the men when they arrived in Portsmouth, as they had read previous reports about the expedition's problems with scurvy and bad food. Markham was present to meet the ship in Portsmouth when Discovery docked there on 10 September 1904, but no dignitaries greeted the party when it arrived in London a few days later. However, there was considerable public enthusiasm for the expedition, and official recognition followed. Scott was quickly promoted to captain, and invited to Balmoral Castle to meet King Edward VII, who invested him as a Commander of the Royal Victorian Order (CVO). He also received a cluster of medals and awards from overseas, including the French Légion d'honneur. Polar Medals and promotions were given to other officers and crew members.

The main geographical results of the expedition were the discovery of King Edward VII Land; the ascent of the western mountains and the discovery of the Polar Plateau; the first sledge journey on the plateau; the Barrier journey to a Furthest South of 82°17′S. The island nature of Ross Island was established, the Transantarctic Mountains were charted to 83°S, and the positions and heights of more than 200 individual mountains were calculated. Many other features and landmarks were also identified and named, and there was extensive coastal survey work.

There were also discoveries of major scientific importance. These included the snow-free Dry Valleys in the western mountains, the emperor penguin colony at Cape Crozier, scientific evidence that the Ice Barrier was a floating ice shelf, and a leaf fossil discovered by Ferrar which helped to establish Antarctica's relation to the Gondwana super-continent. Thousands of geological and biological specimens had been collected and new marine species identified. The location of the South Magnetic Pole had been calculated with reasonable accuracy. On the medical side, Wilson discovered the anti-scorbutic effects of fresh seal meat, which resolved the lethal threat of scurvy to this and subsequent expeditions. But the explorers were still left confused as to the exact causes of the outbreak.

A general endorsement of the scientific results from the navy's Chief Hydrographer (and former Scott opponent) Sir William Wharton was encouraging. However, when the meteorological data were published their accuracy was disputed within the scientific establishment, including by the President of the Physical Society of London, Dr Charles Chree. Scott defended his team's work, while privately acknowledging that Royds's paperwork in this field had been "dreadfully slipshod".

The expedition succeeded in combating incipient scurvy through a fresh seal meat diet, and Scott recommended it for future polar expeditions. This was despite the medical profession being ignorant of the causes of the disease. At that time it was known that a fresh meat diet could provide a cure, but not that lack of fresh meat or other fresh food containing the as yet undiscovered vitamin C was a cause. Thus, fresh seal meat was taken on the southern journey "in case we find ourselves attacked by scurvy", On his 1907–09 Nimrod expedition Shackleton also avoided the disease through careful dietary provision, including extra penguin and seal meat. However, Lieutenant Edward Evans almost died of presumably self-inflicted scurvy during the 1910–13 Terra Nova Expedition, and scurvy was particularly devastating to Shackleton's marooned Ross Sea party during 1915–16. It remained a danger until its causes were finally established, some 25 years after the Discovery Expedition.

== Aftermath ==
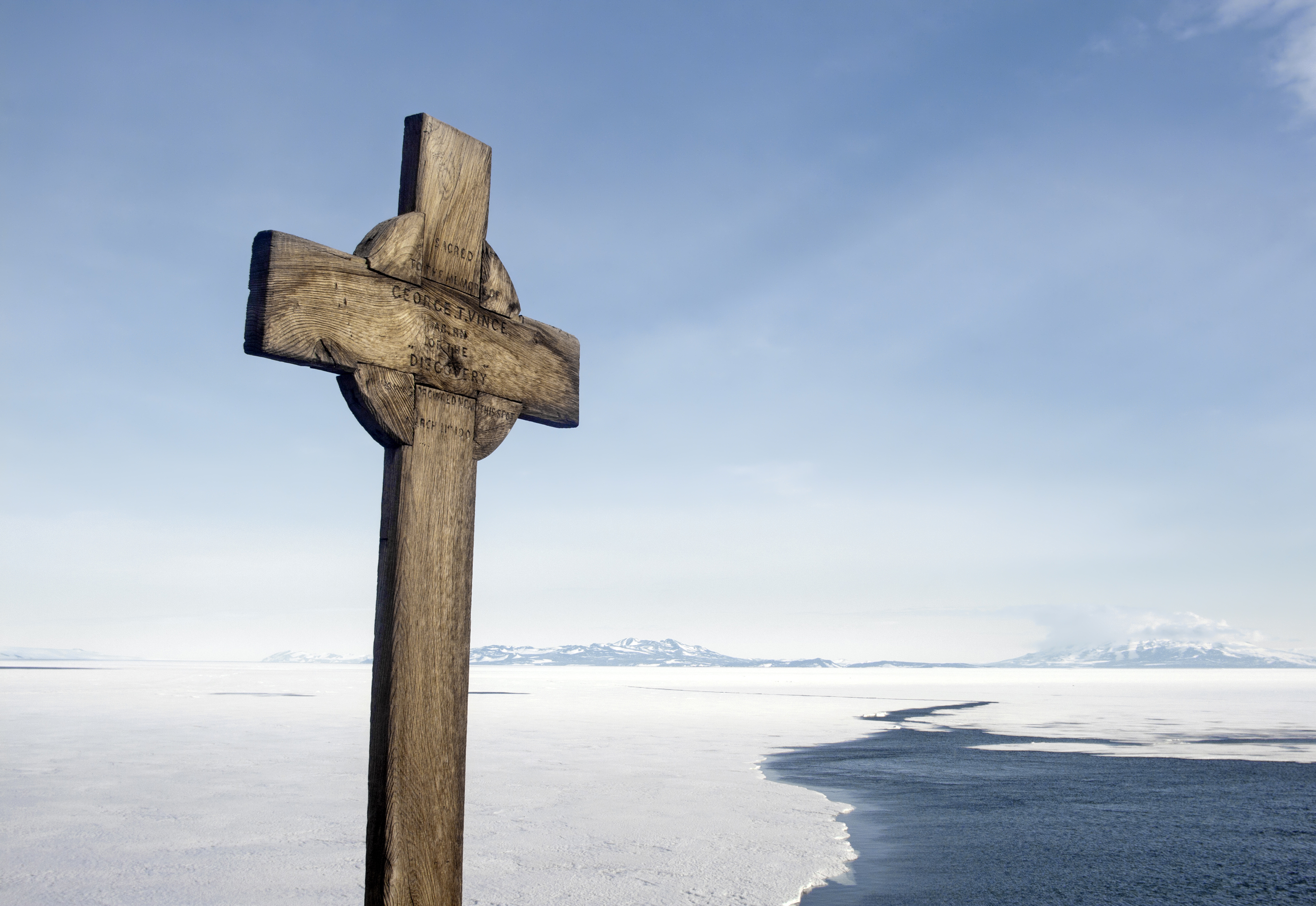
The Vince memorial cross, erected on the Hut Point promontory

Scott was given leave from the Navy to write the official expedition account, The Voyage of the Discovery; this was published in 1905, and sold well. However, Scott's account in the book of Shackleton's breakdown during the southern journey led to disagreement between the two men, particularly over Scott's version of the extent to which his companion had been carried on the sledge. The implication was that Shackleton's breakdown had caused the relatively unimpressive southern record.

Scott eventually resumed his naval career, first as an assistant to the Director of Naval Intelligence and then, in August 1906, as Flag-captain to Rear-Admiral George Egerton on HMS Victorious. He had by this time become a national hero, despite his aversion to the limelight, and the expedition was being presented to the public as a triumph. This euphoria was not conducive to objective analysis, or to thoughtful appraisal of the expedition's strengths and weaknesses. In particular, the glorification by Scott of man-hauling as something intrinsically more noble than other ice travel techniques led to a general distrust of methods involving ski and dogs, a mindset that was carried forward into later expeditions. This mystified seasoned ice travellers such as Fridtjof Nansen, whose advice on such matters was usually sought, but often set aside.

The Discovery Expedition launched the Antarctic careers of several who became stalwarts or leaders of expeditions in the following fifteen years. Apart from Scott and Shackleton, Frank Wild and Ernest Joyce from the lower deck returned repeatedly to the ice, apparently unable to settle back into normal life. William Lashly and Edgar Evans, Scott's companions on the 1903 western journey, aligned themselves with their leader's future plans and became his regular sledging partners. Tom Crean followed both Scott and Shackleton on later expeditions. Lieutenant "Teddy" Evans, first officer on the relief ship Morning, began plans to lead an expedition of his own, before teaming up with Scott in 1910.

Soon after resuming his naval duties, Scott revealed to the Royal Geographical Society his intention to return to Antarctica, but the information was not at that stage made public. Scott was forestalled by Shackleton, who early in 1907 announced his plans to lead an expedition with the twin objectives of reaching the geographic and magnetic South Poles. Under duress, Shackleton agreed not to work from McMurdo Sound, which Scott was claiming as his own sphere of work. In the event, unable to find a safe landing elsewhere, Shackleton was forced to break this promise. His expedition was highly successful, its southern march ending at 88°23′, less than 100 geographical miles from the South Pole, while its northern party reached the location of the South Magnetic Pole. However, Shackleton's breach of his undertaking caused a significant break in relations between the two men, with Scott dismissing his former companion as a liar and a rogue.

Scott's plans gradually came to fruition – a large-scale scientific and geographical expedition with the conquest of the South Pole as its principal objective. Scott was anxious to avoid the amateurism that had been associated with the Discovery Expedition's scientific work. He appointed Edward Wilson as his chief scientist, and Wilson selected an experienced team. The expedition set off in June 1910 in Terra Nova, one of Discovery's relief ships. Its programme was complicated by the simultaneous arrival in the Antarctic of Roald Amundsen's Norwegian expedition. Amundsen's party reached the South Pole on 14 December 1911 and returned safely. Scott and four companions, including Wilson, arrived at the Pole on 17 January 1912; all five perished on the return journey.

== See also ==
- Heroic Age of Antarctic Exploration
- List of Antarctic expeditions

== Notes and references ==
Notes

== Sources ==
- Armston-Sheret, Edward (July 2019). "Tainted bodies: scurvy, bad food and the reputation of the British National Antarctic Expedition, 1901–1904". Journal of Historical Geography. 65: 19–28. doi:10.1016/j.jhg.2019.05.006.
- Armston-Sheret, Edward (2024). "Nourishing food, clean air and exercise: medical debates over environment and polar hygiene on Robert Falcon Scott's British National Antarctic Expedition, 1901–1904". Medical History. 68 (3): 308–324. doi:10.1017/mdh.2024.3. PMC 11655163. PMID 38497456.
- Coleman, E. C. (2006). The Royal Navy in Polar Exploration, from Frobisher to Ross. Stroud (Gloucestershire): Tempus Publishing. ISBN 0-7524-3660-0.
- Crane, David (2005). Scott of the Antarctic: A Life of Courage, and Tragedy in the Extreme South. London: HarperCollins. ISBN 978-0-00-715068-7. OCLC 60793758.
- Fiennes, Ranulph (2003). Captain Scott. London: Hodder & Stoughton Ltd. ISBN 0-340-82697-5.
- Fisher, Marjorie and James (1957). Shackleton. London: James Barrie Books.
- Huntford, Roland (1985). The Last Place on Earth. London: Pan Books. ISBN 0-330-28816-4. OCLC 12976972.
- Huntford, Roland (1985). Shackleton. London: Hodder & Stoughton. ISBN 0-340-25007-0. OCLC 13108800.
- Jones, Max (2003). The Last Great Quest: Captain Scott's Antarctic Sacrifice. Oxford (UK): Oxford University Press. ISBN 0-19-280483-9. OCLC 59303598.
- Markham, Albert H. (1917). The Life of Sir Clements R. Markham KCB FRS. London: John Murray. OCLC 3096468.
- Preston, Diana (1999). A First Rate Tragedy: Captain Scott's Antarctic Expeditions (paperback ed.). London: Constable. ISBN 0-09-479530-4. OCLC 59395617.
- Riffenburgh, Beau (2005). Nimrod: Ernest Shackleton and the Extraordinary Story of the 1907–09 British Antarctic Expedition (paperback ed.). London: Bloomsbury Publishing. ISBN 0-7475-7253-4. OCLC 56659120.
- Savours, Ann (2001). The Voyages of the Discovery: Illustrated History. London: Chatham Publishing. ISBN 1-86176-149-X.
- Scott, Robert Falcon (1905). Voyage of the Discovery (2 vols). London: Smith, Elder & Co.
- Skelton, Judy, ed. (2004). The Antarctic Journals of Reginald Skelton: 'Another Little Job for the Tinker'. Cheltenham: Reardon. ISBN 1-873877-68-4.
- Smith, Michael (2000). An Unsung Hero: Tom Crean, Antarctic Survivor. London: Headline Book Publishing. ISBN 1-903464-09-9.
- Wilson, Edward (1966). Savours, Ann (ed.). Diary of the Discovery Expedition. London: Blandford Press. ISBN 0-7137-0431-4.

Online sources

- "Purchasing Power of British Pounds from 1264 to Present". MeasuringWorth.
