= David Walton (ecologist) =

British ecologist (1945–2019)

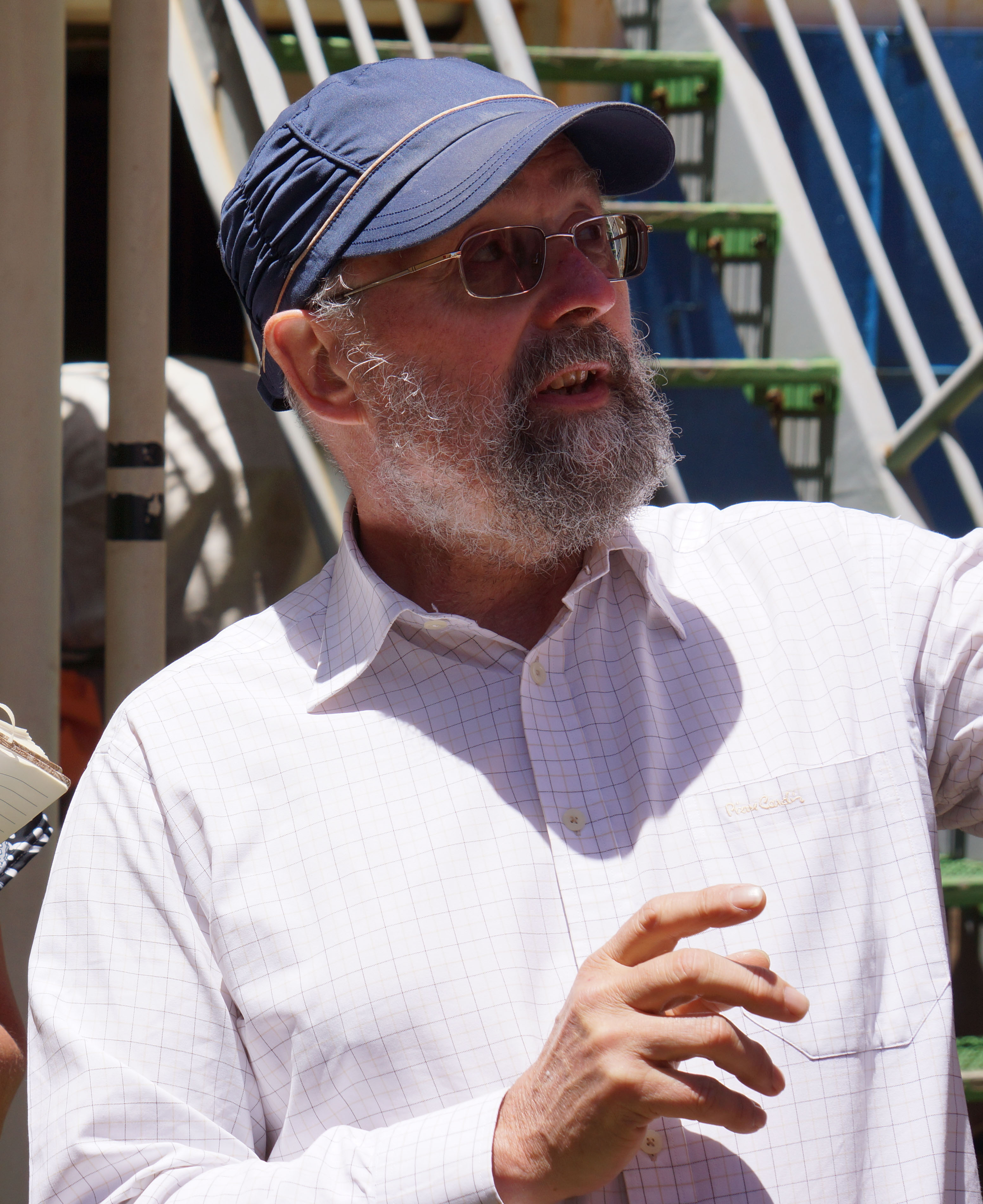
- David Walton in 2016
- Died: 12 February 2019
- Education: BSc Edinburgh; PhD University of Birmingham
- Scientific career
- Fields: Terrestrial Biology
- Workplaces: British Antarctic Survey

David W. H. Walton (1945 – 12 February 2019) was a British academic with the British Antarctic Survey.

== Career ==
Walton trained as an ecologist and was a specialist in the Antarctic. He was the first chair of the Scientific Committee on Antarctic Research (SCAR) Standing Committee on the Antarctic Treaty System and held this position from 2002 to 2006.

He was the Chief Scientist on the Antarctic Circumpolar Expedition (ACE) which took place from December 2016 to March 2017 aboard the Russian research vessel Akademik Treshnikov.

== Awards and honours ==
2006 SCAR Medal for International Scientific Coordination.

== Selected publications ==
- Antarctic Science. (founding and Chief editor, 1987–2019).
- Politics in a Cold Climate: Antarctic Science and Governance. Cambridge University Press. (With John Dudeney)
- Antarctica: Global Science from a Frozen Continent. Cambridge University Press, 2013. (Editor) ISBN 978-1107003927
