= William Lashly =

English sailor (1867–1940)

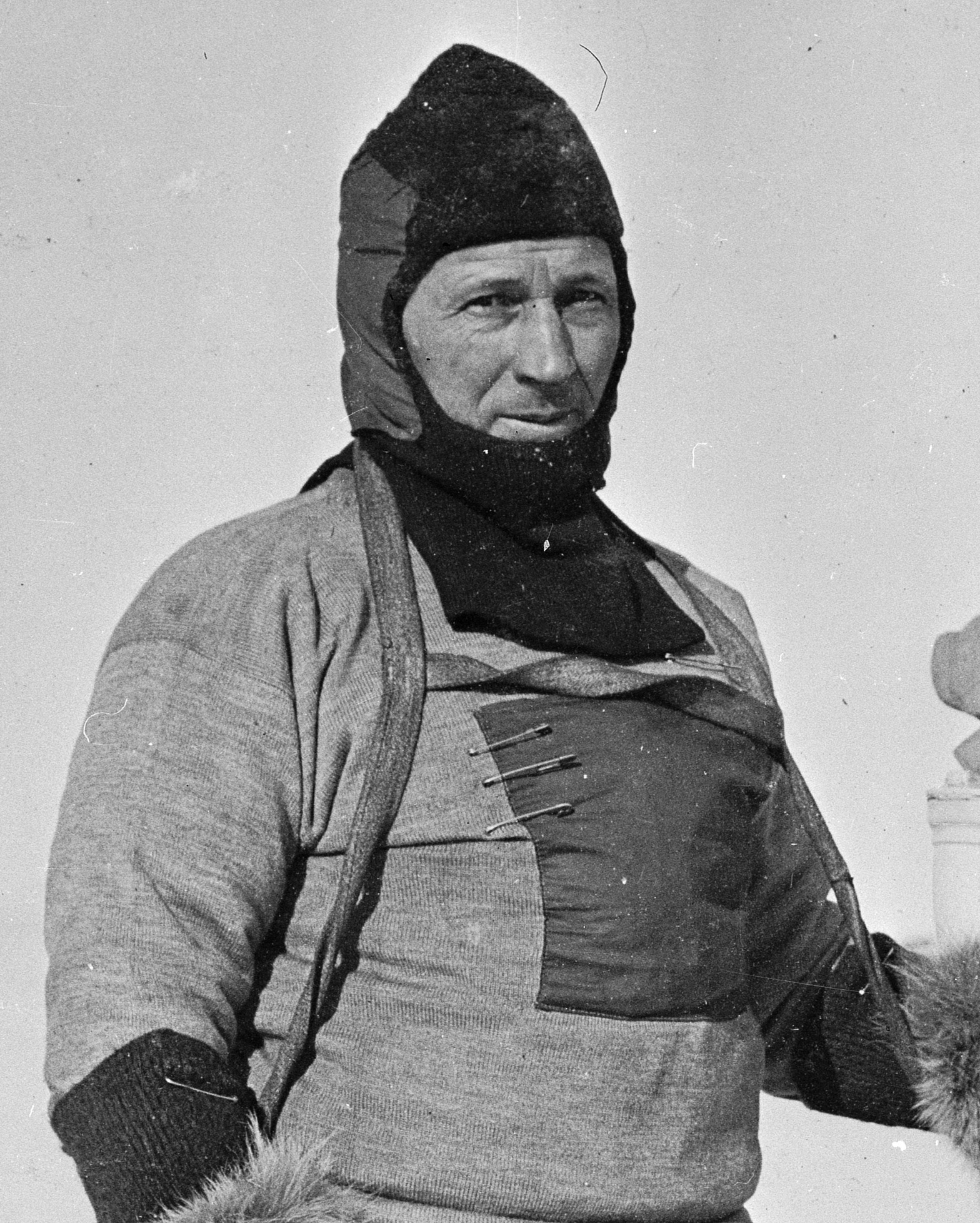
- Lashly in November 1911
- Born: 25 December 1867; Hambledon, Hampshire, England
- Died: 12 June 1940 (aged 72); Hambledon, Hampshire, England
- Military career
- Branch: Royal Navy
- Service years: 1889–1918
- Conflict: World War I
- Awards: Albert Medal, Polar Medal

William Lashly (25 December 1867 – 12 June 1940) was a Royal Navy seaman who served as lead stoker on both the Discovery expedition and the Terra Nova expedition to Antarctica, for which he was awarded the Polar Medal. Lashly was also recognised with the Albert Medal for playing a key role in saving the life of a comrade on the second of the two expeditions.

== Career ==
=== Discovery expedition ===
The son of a farm worker, Lashly was born in Hambledon, Hampshire, a village near Portsmouth, England. At the time he joined Captain Robert Falcon Scott's Discovery expedition in 1901, he was a 33-year-old leading stoker in the Royal Navy, serving on HMS Duke of Wellington. On this expedition, Lashly proved a success and was a member of Scott's "Farthest West" party exploring Victoria Land in 1903.

A teetotaller and non-smoker, he was quiet and strong, good-natured, dependable and acknowledged by Reginald Skelton as 'the best man far and away in the ship'. Before joining Scott's next Antarctic expedition in 1910, he served as an instructor at the Royal Naval College, Osborne, on the Isle of Wight.

=== Terra Nova expedition ===
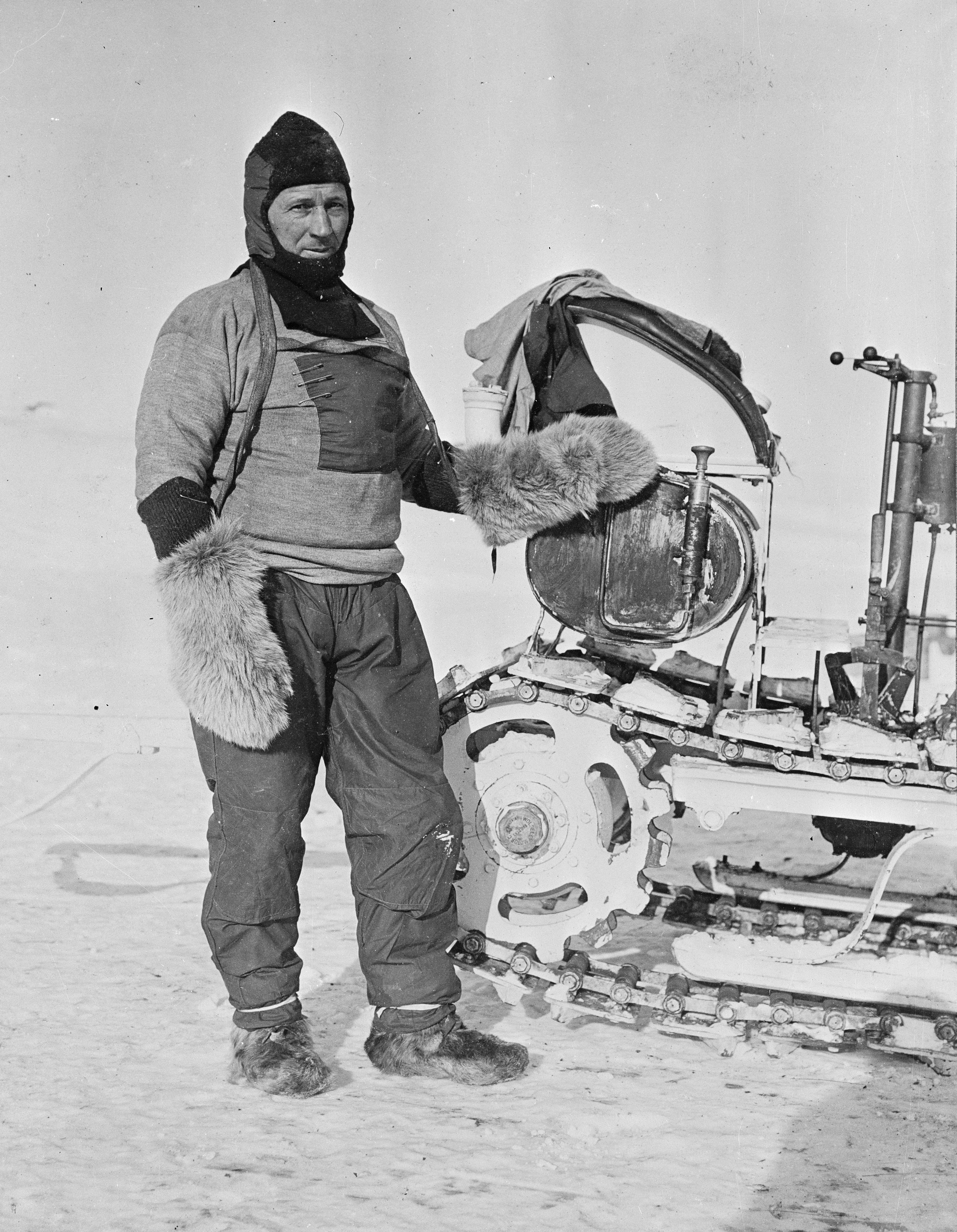
William Lashly by a motor sledge in November 1911.

On Scott's second expedition in 1911–1913, Lashly was initially in charge of one of the expedition's two motor sledges which were to haul supplies southward in support of the polar party. However, the sledges quickly broke down, and the motor party had to switch to man-hauling the supplies.

On 25 December 1911, Lashly celebrated his birthday by falling into a crevasse on the Antarctic Plateau. Scott recorded the following in his diary:

I looked round and found the second sledge halted some way in rear – evidently someone had gone into a crevasse. We saw the rescue work going on, but had to wait half an hour for the party to come up, and got mighty cold. It appears that Lashly went down very suddenly, nearly dragging the crew with him. The sledge ran on and jammed the span so that the Alpine rope had to be got out and used to pull Lashly to the surface again. Lashly says the crevasse was 50 feet deep and 8 feet across, in form U, showing that the word ‘unfathomable’ can rarely be applied. Lashly is 44 to-day and as hard as nails. His fall has not even disturbed his equanimity.

On 4 January 1912, along with Lieutenant Edward Evans and Tom Crean, he was a member of the last support party to be sent back by Scott on his way to the pole. During the 730-mile (1,170 km) return journey, Evans became seriously ill with scurvy, and on 11 February, collapsed, unable to walk any further. Still 100 miles (160 km) from Hut Point camp and safety, he tried to persuade Lashly and Crean to leave him to save themselves, but they refused.

Strapping him onto the sledge, they pulled him for days until with only one to two days' food rations left, but still four or five days' sledge pulling to do, they had to stop. Lashly then stayed with Evans in the tent to nurse him while Crean walked the remaining 35 miles (60 km) alone in 18 hours to reach Hut Point camp, where he was able to fetch help. Extracts from Lashly's polar journals, chronicling his tribulations with the motor sledges and the return journey with Evans, were included in Apsley Cherry-Garrard's book, The Worst Journey in the World. Both Lashly and Crean received the Albert Medal for saving Evans' life.

=== Royal Navy ===
After returning from the Antarctic, Lashly retired from the Royal Navy with a pension, but promptly joined the reserves and served in World War I on HMS Irresistible and HMS Amethyst. Later he served as a customs officer in Cardiff. Upon his retirement in 1932, he returned to Hambledon where he lived in a house he called "Minna Bluff", after one of the landmarks on the road to the South Pole. Lashly died on 12 June 1940.

== Antarctic diaries ==
In 1969, Lashly's diaries were edited and published by A. R. Ellis as Under Scott's Command: Lashly's Antarctic Diaries. It provides insight into both the Discovery and Terra Nova expeditions from the perspective of one of the men rather than the more common accounts published by officers.

== In popular culture ==
Lashly was portrayed by Norman Williams in the 1948 film Scott of the Antarctic, and by Tom Georgeson in the 1985 television serial The Last Place on Earth.
