= Edgar Evans =

Welsh explorer (1876–1912)

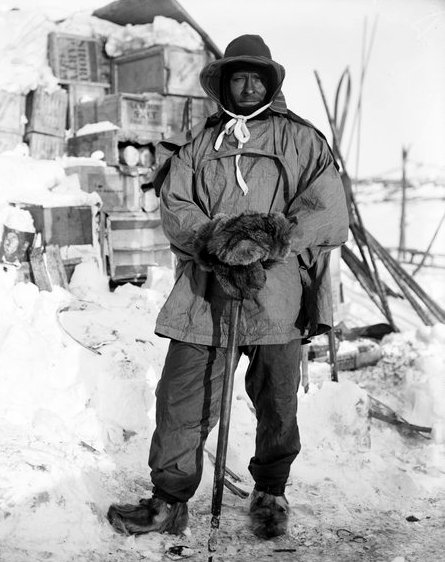
- Edgar Evans in 1911
- Born: 7 March 1876; Rhossili, Wales
- Died: 17 February 1912 (aged 35); Ross Ice Shelf, Antarctica
- Spouse: Lois (m. 1904)
- Military career
- Allegiance: United Kingdom
- Branch: Royal Navy
- Service years: 1891–1912
- Rank: Petty Officer, First Class
- Memorials: Church of St. Mary the Virgin, Rhossili; Evans Building, HMS Excellent; Ski Memorial, Evans Building; Evans Névé, Antarctica

Petty Officer Edgar Evans (7 March 1876 – 17 February 1912) was a Welsh Royal Navy petty officer and member of the polar party in Robert Falcon Scott's Terra Nova Expedition to the South Pole in 1911–1912. This group of five men, personally selected for the final expedition push, attained the Pole on 17 January 1912. The party died as they attempted to return to the base camp, when extreme weather conditions prevented them from reaching a vital supply depot.

== Background ==
Evans was born in Rhossili, Wales, the son of a seaman. He attended St. Helen's Boys School from the age of six until he was thirteen, then enlisted in the Royal Navy in 1891, and in 1899 began service on HMS Majestic, where Scott was serving as a torpedo lieutenant.

== Discovery Expedition ==
Evans then joined Scott's first Antarctic expedition in Discovery in 1901–1904. Along with William Lashly, he accompanied Scott on his "Furthest West" sledge journey to the interior of Victoria Land in 1903.

== Terra Nova expedition ==
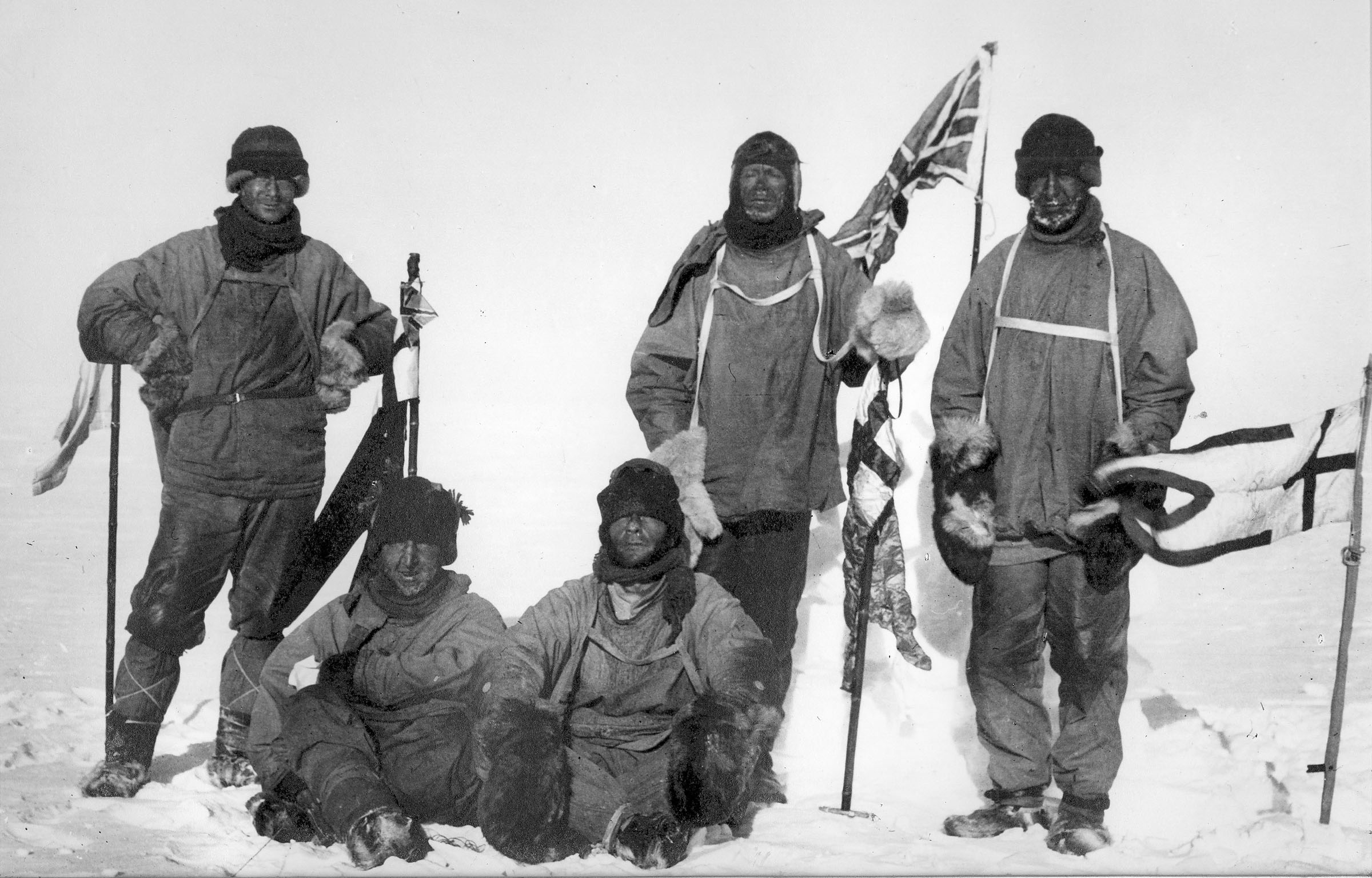
At the South Pole: Evans seated on the right

Scott's biographer Roland Huntford described Evans as "a huge, bull-necked beefy figure" and a "beery womanizer" who was "running a bit to fat" by the time of Scott's second expedition in Terra Nova. Evans was nearly left behind in New Zealand when he drunkenly fell into the water while boarding the ship. However, held in high regard by Scott for "his resourcefulness, his strength and fund of anecdotes," Scott decided to overlook the incident.

Scott chose Evans as a member of his polar party, with Lieutenant Henry Robertson Bowers, Lawrence Oates, and Edward Adrian Wilson. Scott described Evans as "a giant worker—he is responsible for every sledge, every sledge-fitting, tents, sleeping-bags, harness, and when one cannot recall a single expression of dissatisfaction with any one of these items, it shows what an invaluable assistant he has been". Eleven weeks after setting off from base camp, the Polar party reached the South Pole on 17 January 1912, only to discover that Roald Amundsen's five-man party had beaten them to the Pole by five weeks.

Their return journey soon became a desperate affair. Evans had cut his hand in an accident as they were nearing the pole, and the wound did not heal properly. During the return journey Evans began to deteriorate mentally as well as physically, suffering from frostbite to his fingers, nose and cheeks. As they descended the Beardmore Glacier, he is thought to have suffered a head injury in a fall into a crevasse on 4 February, sustaining a serious concussion which caused his condition to rapidly worsen. During the whole descent his condition delayed the party, and the surplus food gradually diminished.

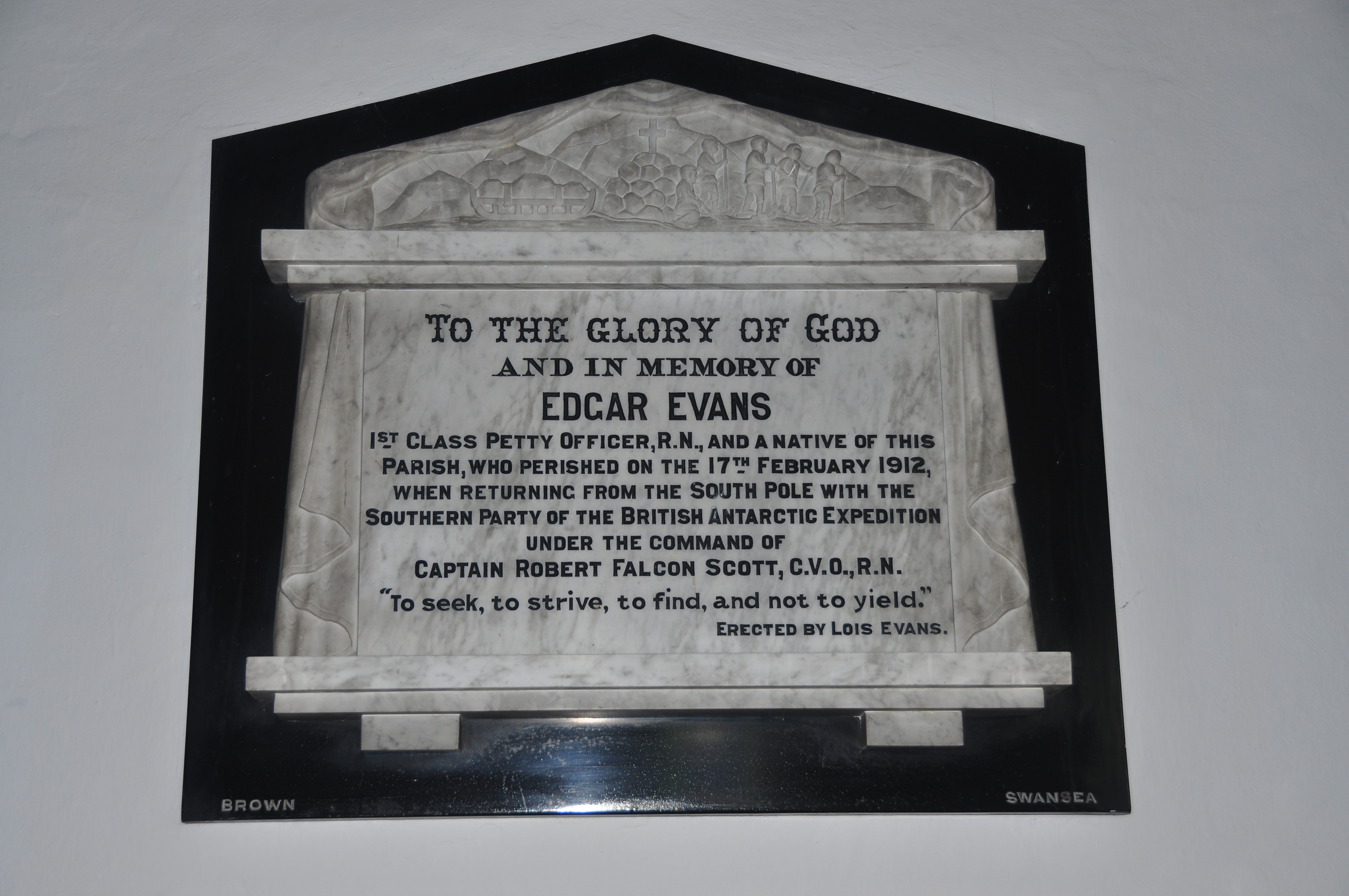
Memorial to Evans in St Mary's Church, Rhossili, Wales

On 16 February 1912, nearing the base of the glacier, Evans collapsed. The next morning, unable to keep up, he was left behind while the others went ahead man-hauling the sledge towards the next supply depot; they had to make a return journey to fetch him. Scott's diary described Evans's condition when they found him: "He was on his knees with clothing disarranged, hands uncovered and frostbitten, and a wild look in his eyes." He was placed onto a sledge and taken to the camp they had set up. By the time he was placed in the tent, he was comatose. He died in the tent that night. It was not recorded what was done with his body, and none of the other members of the polar party survived the return journey.

His widow erected a plaque in his memory in the Norman church at Rhossili. It reads "To the Glory of God and in memory of Edgar Evans 1st Class Petty Officer, R.N., and a native of this Parish, who perished on 17 February 1912, when returning from the South Pole with the Southern Party of the British Antarctic Expedition under the command of Captain Robert Falcon Scott, C.V.O., R.N. 'To seek, to strive, to find, and not to yield.'"

Evans was also remembered at the naval shore establishment on Whale Island, Portsmouth where the Edgar Evans Building was opened in 1964, the first to be named after a petty officer rather than an admiral. The building was demolished in 2010, but a new accommodation block was named after Evans. The new building contains a memorial to him that incorporates two skis he used in Antarctica. An award, named the 'Edgar Evans Award', is also given each year to the highest placed student of all Petty Officer (Missile) courses for that year.

There is also a commemorative plaque on the Scott lighthouse memorial in Roath Park Lake in Cardiff, South Wales, which lists all of the crew members including Evans. Evans Névé, Victoria Land, is named in honour of Edgar Evans.

== In popular culture ==
In the film Scott of the Antarctic, Evans was played by James Robertson Justice. In the Central TV production The Last Place on Earth, Evans was played by Pat Roach, and in BBC Radio 4's The Worst Journey in the World by Huw Davies.
