= Louis Bernacchi =

Australian physicist and astronomer

Louis Charles Bernacchi
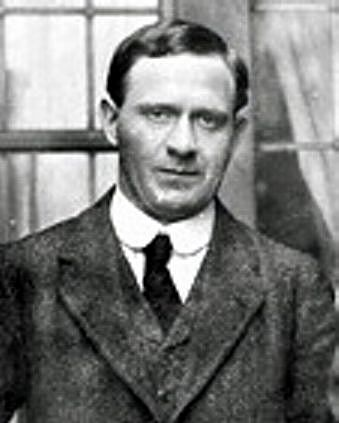
- Bernacchi in 1910
- Born: 8 November 1876; Belgium
- Died: 24 April 1942 (aged 65); London, England
- Spouse(s): Winifred Edith, née Harris (m. 1906)
- Children: Michael Bernacchi
- Military career
- Allegiance: United Kingdom
- Branch: Royal Navy
- Years of service: 1914-1919 & 1939-1942
- Rank: Lieutenant commander
- Expeditions: Southern Cross expedition; Discovery expedition
- Awards: Polar Medal (1904); French Cross of the Légion d'honneur (1906); United States Navy Cross (1919); Royal Geographical Society medal

Louis Charles Bernacchi CMG OBE (8 November 1876 – 24 April 1942) was an Australian physicist and astronomer best known for his role in several Antarctic expeditions.

== Early life ==
Bernacchi was born in Belgium on 8 November 1876 to Italian parents in one of the communes of Brussels known as Schaerbeek. His father, Diego Bernacchi, established a vineyard on Maria Island in 1884. He was educated in Hobart, Tasmania, at the Hutchins School from May 1889 and finished at the school around Easter 1891. He entered the Melbourne Observatory in 1895, where he spent about three years studying magnetism and meteorology. During this period, he developed an interest in Antarctic exploration, expressed in letters to the press and by following the proceedings of Antarctic Exploration Committees.

== Polar exploration ==
He joined Carstens Borchgrevink's Southern Cross expedition (1898–1900), which wintered at Cape Adare, Antarctica, joining the expedition in Christchurch, New Zealand, after the previous physicist candidate had been rejected on medical grounds. The expedition was the first to spend the winter on the Antarctic continent (the Belgian Antarctic Expedition having been first to overwinter in 1898) and the first to sledge towards the South Pole. He was awarded the Cuthbert-Peek Grant of the Royal Geographical Society that allowed him to work on the geomagnetic data. He wrote a book about the expedition "To the South Polar Regions: Expedition of 1898–1900", published in 1900. His granddaughter Janet Crawford has edited a version of his diaries from the expedition under the title "That First Antarctic Winter: The Story of the Southern Cross Expedition of 1898–1900".

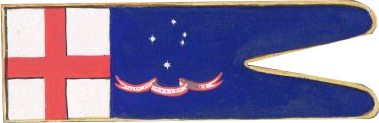
Sledge flag used by Bernacchi in Antarctica during the Discovery expedition

He was again a physicist on the Discovery expedition led by Robert Falcon Scott (1901–1904). Bernacchi was the only man on this expedition who had previously been to the Antarctic. During the trip, he made extensive magnetic observations. Following the trip, Bernacchi was awarded the Royal Geographical Society and Polar Medals as well as the Légion d'honneur. Scott was the best man at Bernacchi's marriage in 1906.

== Subsequent career ==
Following two short expeditions to Africa and the upper Amazon Basin in Peru, Bernacchi made two unsuccessful attempts to run for the House of Commons as a Liberal Party candidate, standing in Widnes in 1910. He also invested in rubber plantations in Malaya, Java and Borneo.

During World War I, he served in the Royal Naval Volunteer Reserve, the Admiralty in the anti-submarine division, and later with the United States Navy. In 1919, he received both an Order of the British Empire and the United States Navy Cross. Following the war, he returned to his interests in rubber.

He remained active in scientific organisations, most notably the Royal Geographical Society, serving as a council member between 1928 and 1932. Bernacchi planned his own expedition to the Antarctic in 1925, but failed to raise sufficient funds. In 1930, he organised the British Polar Exhibition and helped to organise the Second International Polar Year in 1932.

Bernacchi wrote a number of books on the Antarctic including a biography of Lawrence Oates called A Very Gallant Gentleman published in 1933, and Saga of the Discovery in 1938. In World War II, he returned to the Royal Naval Reserve Volunteers before his death in 1942.

== Commemoration ==
Three landmarks in Antarctica are named after him: Bernacchi Head, on Franklin Island, Cape Bernacchi and Bernacchi Bay, both on the coast of Victoria Land.

== Taxon named in his honor ==
A species of Antarctic fish, the Trematomus bernacchii, was named in his honor.

== Stamps ==
In 2001, Australia Post issued a postal stamp in honour of the 100th anniversary of Australia's involvement in Antarctic exploration.

== Sculptures ==
The Premier of Tasmania, Jim Bacon, unveiled sculptures of Bernacchi and fellow explorers at Sullivans Cove.

== Writings ==
- The South Polar Times. London: Smith, Elder & co., 1907–1914. (Volume 2 editor.) An exact reproduction of the South Polar Times originally issued during the Antarctic expeditions of Robert F. Scott.
- Saga of the "Discovery". London: Glasgow, Blackie and son, Ltd. [1938] : Re-printed by Rooster Books Ltd (2001) ISBN 9781871510225
- To the south polar regions: expedition of 1898–1900. By Louis Bernacchi; introduction by D.W.H. Walton. Denton, Harleston, Norfolk: Bluntisham Books : Erskine Press, 1991. ISBN 1-85297-035-9
- A very gallant gentleman. London: T. Butterworth, ltd. [1933].
- That first Antarctic winter : the story of the Southern Cross Expedition of 1898–1900 as told in the diaries of Louis Charles Bernacchi / written and edited by Janet Crawford (Louis' granddaughter). Christchurch, N.Z.: South Latitude Research Ltd., in association with P.J. Skellerup, c1998. ISBN 0-473-04966-X
- Bernacchi, Louis; Royal Geographical Society (Great Britain) (1901), Topography of South Victoria Land (Antarctic), Royal Geographical Society,]
