= Terra Nova (ship) =

Early 1900s ship

Coordinates: 60.254167°N 45.929167°W

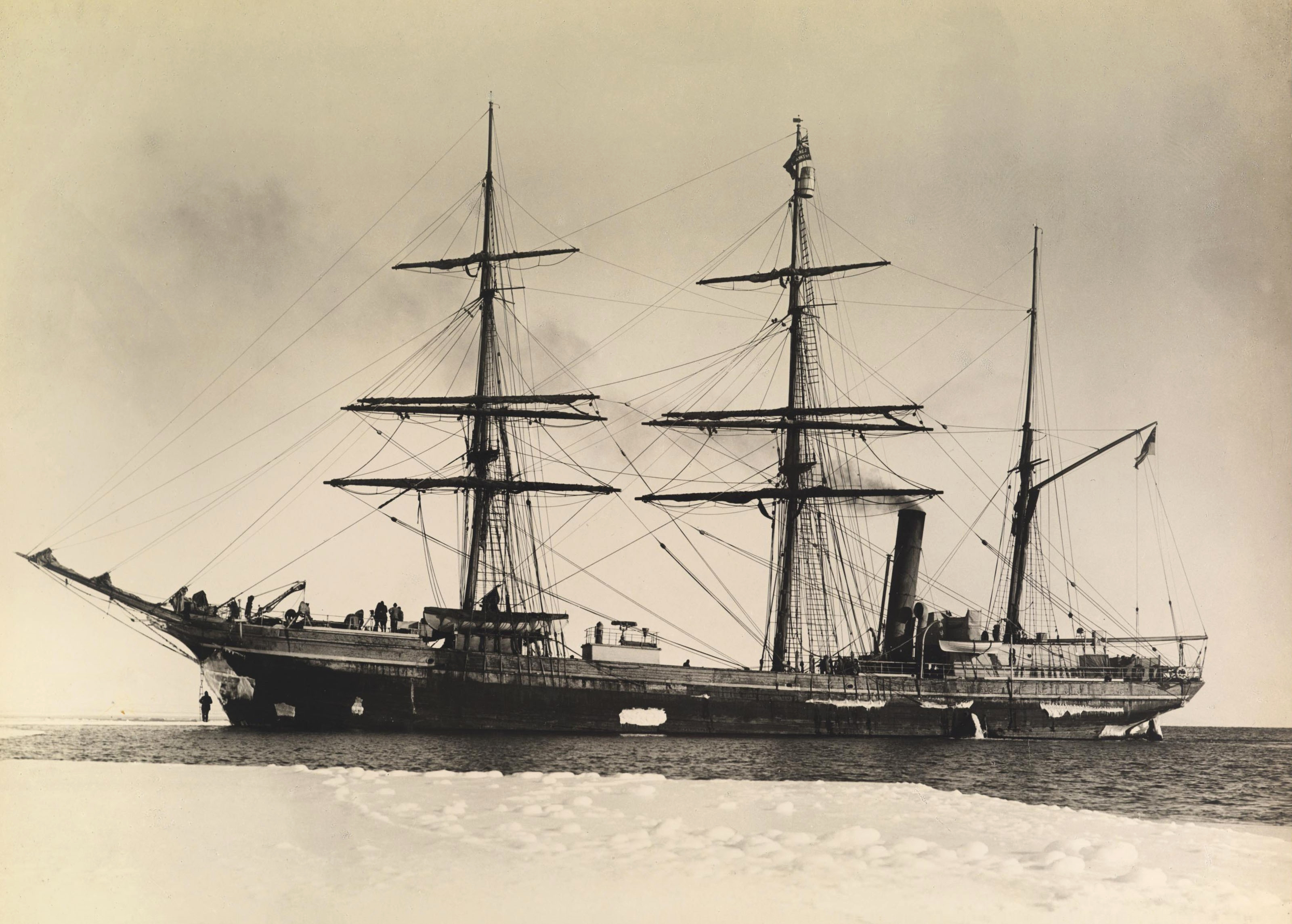
- Terra Nova in 1911

History
- Namesake: Newfoundland (Terra Nova in Latin)
- Builder: Alexander Stephen and Sons, Dundee, Scotland
- Launched: 1884
- Fate: Sunk off Greenland, 13 September 1943

General characteristics
- Type: Wooden-hulled barque; 1 funnel, 3 masts
- Tonnage: 764 grt
- Length: 187 ft (57 m)
- Beam: 31.4 ft (9.6 m)
- Draught: 19 ft (5.8 m)
- Propulsion: Compound Steam Engine; 140 bhp (100 kW), 1 screw propeller
- Crew: 65

Terra Nova was a whaler and polar expedition ship. The ship carried the 1910 British Antarctic Expedition, Robert Falcon Scott's last expedition.

== Construction ==
Terra Nova (Latin for "new land") was built in 1884 for the Dundee whaling and sealing fleet and was ideally suited to the polar regions and had been operating for 10 years in the annual seal fishery in the Labrador Straits.

== Expedition relief ==
In 1903, Terra Nova sailed in company with fellow ex-whaler SY Morning to assist in freeing the National Antarctic Expedition's RRS Discovery from McMurdo Sound. On return to Great Britain, expedition leader Commander Robert Falcon Scott was promoted to the rank of captain.

On return from the Antarctic, Terra Nova was purchased by the American millionaire William Ziegler and placed under the command of a Norwegian, Captain Johan Kjeldsen. She sailed to the Arctic to return members of the US Fiala/Ziegler expedition from Franz Josef Land to Norway. This expedition had lost its ship America, crushed by ice, during an attempt to reach the North Pole.

After returning to Newfoundland in 1906, Terra Nova resumed sealing duties with her owners, C. T. Bowring & Co. of St. John's and Liverpool.

== British Antarctic Expedition, 1910 ==
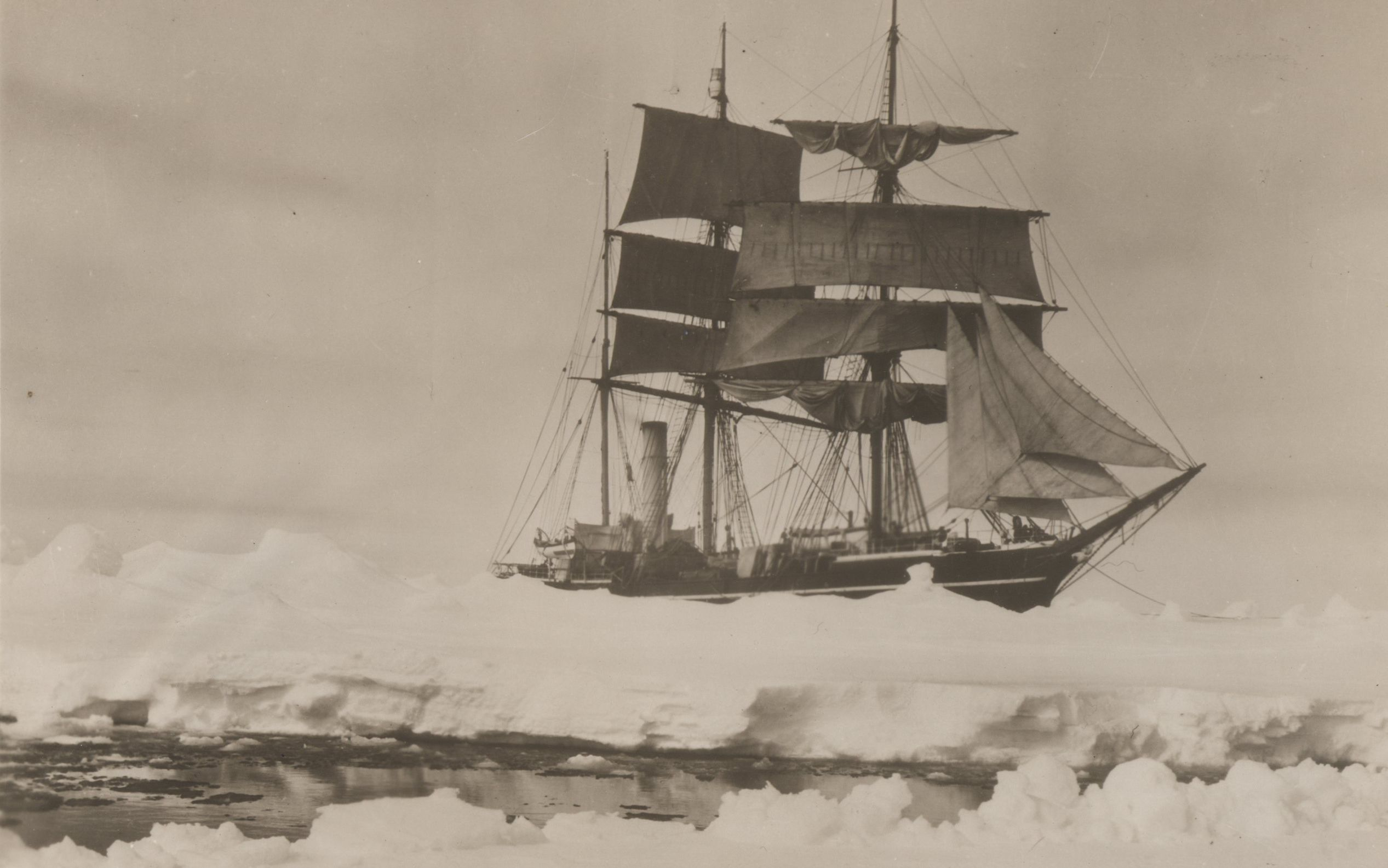
Terra Nova, photographed in December 1910 by Herbert Ponting

In 1909, Terra Nova was bought by Captain Robert Scott for £12,500, as the expedition ship for the British Antarctic Expedition 1910. Reinforced from bow to stern with seven feet of oak to protect against the Antarctic ice pack, she sailed from Cardiff Docks on 15 June 1910 under Scott's command. He described her as "a wonderfully fine ice ship.... As she bumped the floes with mighty shocks, crushing and grinding a way through some, twisting and turning to avoid others, she seemed like a living thing fighting a great fight".

The twenty-four officers and scientific staff made valuable observations in biology, geology, glaciology, meteorology, and geophysics along the coast of Victoria Land and on the Ross Ice Shelf. After wintering at Cape Evans on Ross Island, Scott, Henry Bowers, Edgar Evans, Lawrence Oates, and Edward Wilson set out on a race to be the first men at the South Pole. Starting with tractors and Mongolian ponies, the final 800 miles (1,300 km) was covered by man-hauling alone. Reaching the South Pole on 17 January 1912, they found that Roald Amundsen's expedition (based on Fram) had beaten them by thirty-four days. After experiencing extreme weather during the return journey, they were unable to reach one of their vital supply depots, and all five men died. The frozen bodies of three were discovered eight months later, in November 1912. Their journals and papers were found and retrieved.

== Later career ==
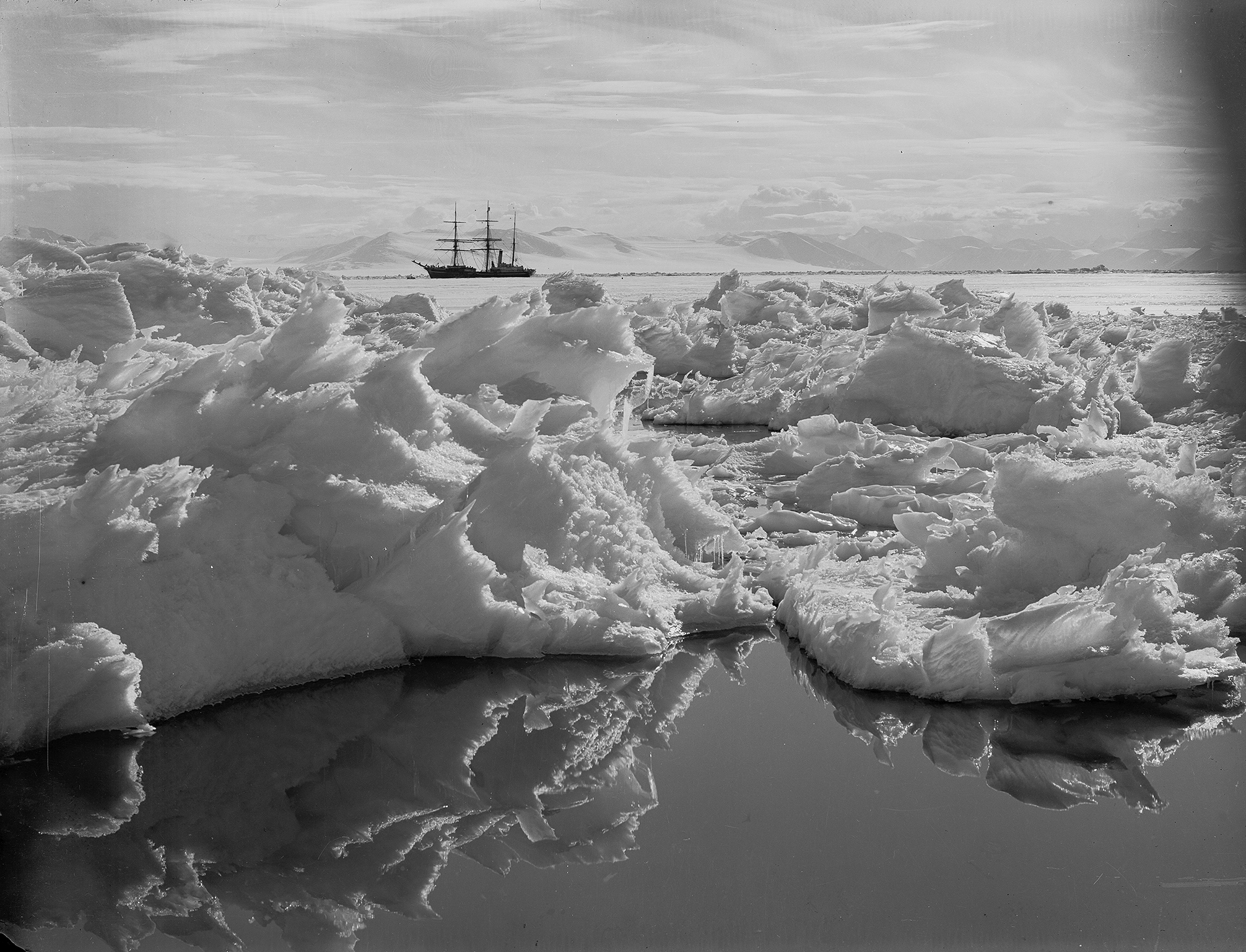
Terra Nova (1911)

After returning from the Antarctic in 1913, Terra Nova was repurchased by her former owners and resumed work in the Newfoundland seal fishery. In 1918 she was chartered by the Dominion Steel and Coal Corporation to transport coal from the coal mines at North Sydney to Bell Island.

In 1942, Terra Nova was chartered by Newfoundland Base Contractors to carry supplies to base stations in Greenland. On 12 September 1943 at 2205, the vessel sent an SOS reporting that water was over the boilers and pumps were not working. The US Coast Guard Cutters Atak, Amarok, Laurel, and Manitou, all part of the Greenland Patrol of the US Atlantic Fleet, responded. Atak reached Terra Nova on 13 September. They rescued all personnel aboard and set the ship alight before proceeding to Narsarssuak, Greenland. Laurel proceeded to the site of Terra Nova. The burning hulk was sunk by gunfire the same day.

== Artefacts ==
The figurehead from Terra Nova was removed in 1913 and presented to Cardiff City Council which in 1932 donated it to the National Museum of Wales. Her bell is kept at the Scott Polar Research Institute, part of the University of Cambridge. It was given to the institute on 20 October 1952 by Lady Nicholson of Eden, who was given the bell by her nephew, Edward L. Atkinson, the surgeon on Scott's last expedition.

The ship's binnacle is displayed in the Pierhead Suite of the Pierhead Building, Cardiff Bay, a short distance from the point where Scott's crew sailed from Cardiff.

In July 2012, the wreck of Terra Nova was discovered by the Schmidt Ocean Institute’s flagship RV Falkor. In June 2025, a visual survey of the wreck was completed by a team of maritime archaeologists aboard the MY Legend. Using a submersible, the expedition captured high-resolution imagery of the wreck which confirmed its identity and revealed key structural features such as the helm station and the winch motors. The survey also documented the marine life living around the wreck.

== See also ==
- List of Antarctic exploration ships from the Heroic Age, 1897–1922
