= Stuart Robertson (photographer) =

Entrepreneur born in New Zealand

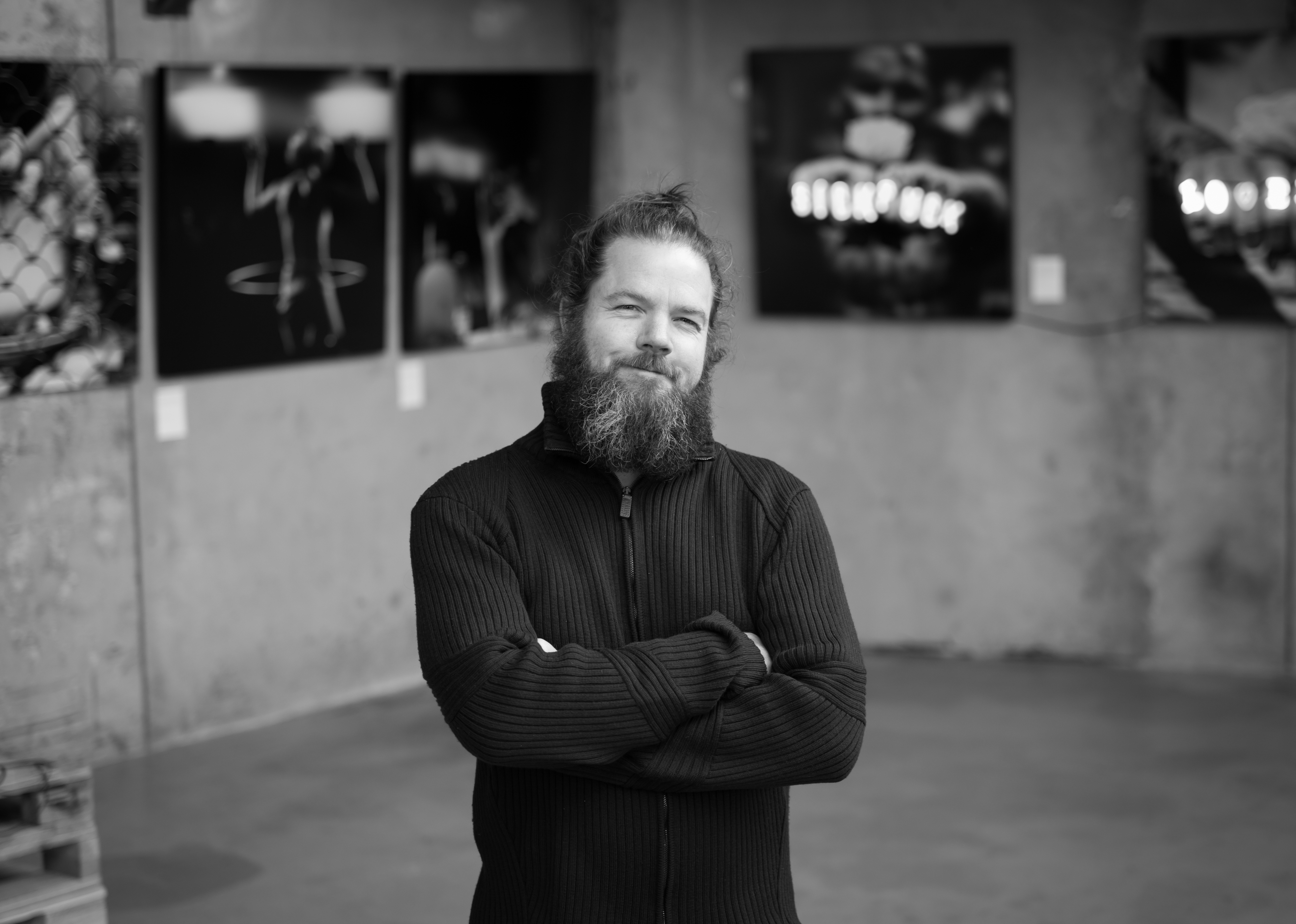
- Born: November 10, 1969 (age 57); Auckland, New Zealand
- Education: Auckland University of Technology
- Occupations: Photographer, entrepreneur
- Known for: Portraits and artwork
- Notable work: Peace in 10,000 Hands
- Website: www.stuartrobertson.me; www.peacein10000hands.com

Stuart Robertson (born 10 November 1969), is a New Zealand entrepreneur, designer, and photographer. He is known for taking portraits of the Dalai Lama and Archbishop Desmond Tutu. He has also founded creative companies in New Zealand and California.

== Early career ==
Robertson started his career as an entertainer on TVNZ and stage as a pickpocket, magician, comedian, presenter and emcee. Television shows were prank based shows including the Great Kiwi Video Show and Just Kidding, where he performed all of the pranks.

== Career in art ==
Robertson is a contemporary artist, adventurer and humanitarian who often works with photography, sculpture, film, symbolism, and social media with cast glass, gold leafs, neon, and lightboxes.

Robertson has two permanent galleries: one in Queenstown for Peace in 10,000 Hands and one in Auckland – Gallery 33

=== Peace in 10,000 Hands ===
Robertson defined the project as:

"An evocative and unstoppable global art project creating a visual provocation to challenge and reinvigorate the conversation for peace. Contemporary artworks that speak profoundly to our similarities in the human condition"

His goal is to capture profound images of a single white rose as a symbol of peace. The project has received global media attention and coverage. Robertson has traveled to seven continents and takes the rose on road with him as he travels and photographs it in the hands of people around the world.

In 2015, Robertson published a coffee table book featuring a collection of images and stories from the first five years of the project.

=== Antarctic visits ===
Invited by Antarctica New Zealand as part of the Community Engagement Programme for the 2014 / 2015 and the 2017 / 18 seasons, Robertson stayed at Scott Base on both trips and visited McMurdo Station as part of his Peace in 10,000 Hands Project to raise the importance of Antarctica in his "global context of Peace".

Robertson visited and photographed Hillary's Hut, Scott's Hut and Captain Shackleton's hut at Cape Royds, and Discovery Hut on Ross Island. As part of his trip, Robertson camped in the McMurdo Dry Valleys to document the driest and harshest conditions on Earth.

== Career in film ==
Robertson was commissioned by the Auckland War Memorial Museum to create a film for International Day of Peace. The film was projected onto the front of the Museum.

Robertson produced The Exquisite Clarity of Standing Together, a collaboration with Tiki Taane for his exhibition at Pataka Art + Museum. The collaboration utilized Robertson's images with a specially written original piece of music.

== Bibliography ==
- Peace In 10,00 Hands, self-published, 2014. ISBN 978-0-473-30905-3
- Colours Of Antarctica, Glorious Digital, 2024. ISBN 978-0-473-71498-7
