= Pennycook =

Pennycook is a surname. Notable people with the surname include:

- Alastair Pennycook (born 1957), linguist
- Chevvy Pennycook (born 1985), English rugby union player for Bristol Rugby
- Gordon Pennycook, Canadian psychologist
- Jean Pennycook, American educator and zoologist.
- Matthew Pennycook (born 1982), British Labour Party politician, Member of Parliament (MP) for Greenwich & Woolwich since 2015
- Neil Scott Pennycook, Scottish musician and member of indie rockband Meursault.
- Redford Pennycook (born 1987), English rugby union player for Moseley in the Aviva Championship
- Richard Pennycook (born 1964), British business executive
