= Artists to Antarctica =

- Date: 1957 -->
- Country: New Zealand
- Hosted by: Antarctica New Zealand
- Website: Official Webpage

The Artists to Antarctica programme, also known as the Antarctica New Zealand Arts Fellowship and the Invited Artists Programme Antarctic Arts Fellows, was a community engagement programme run by Antarctica New Zealand, the government agency conducting New Zealand's activities in Antarctica.

From the 2014/15 season, this program was replaced by The Antarctica New Zealand Community Engagement Programme.

== Recipients ==
Recipients of Antarctica New Zealand Arts Fellowship under the Artists to Antarctica Programme and the Invited Artists Programme include:

| Date | Recipient | Occupation/organization | Position |
|---|---|---|---|
| 2013/14 | Nigel Latta | NZ on Air | Invited Media |
| 2013/14 | Andris Apse | Photographer | Invited Artist |
| 2013/14 | Brent Waters and Will Hine | TVNZ | Invited Media |
| 2013/14 | Hamish Clark | TV3 | Invited Media |
| 2013/14 | Deidre Mussen and Karl Drury | Fairfax, Videographer | Invited Media |
| 2012/13 | Roger Donaldson | Film Maker | Invited Artist |
| 2012/13 | Don McGlashan | Musician | Invited Artist |
| 2012/13 | Aaron and Hannah Beehre | Design, painting, interactive surfaces and digital media | Invited Artist |
| 2011/12 | Matt Gauldie | NZ Defence Force Painter | Invited Artist |
| 2011/12 | Jae Hoon Lee | Multi-media | Invited Artist |
| 2010/11 | Laurence Aberhart | Photographer | Invited Artist |
| 2010/11 | Joe Sheehan | Sculptor | Invited Artist |
| 2010/11 | Dave Dobbyn | Musician | Invited Artist |
| 2009/10 | Owen Marshall | Writer | Invited Artist |
| 2009/10 | Peter James Smith | Painter | Invited Artist |
| 2008/09 | Boyd Webb | Photographer | Invited Artist |
| 2008/09 | Lloyd Jones | Writer | Invited Artist |
| 2007/08 | Ronnie van Hout | Artist | Arts Fellow |
| 2007/08 | Tessa Duder | Writer | Arts Fellow |
| 2007/08 | John Walsh | Painter | Invited Artist |
| 2006/07 | Clare Plug | Textile artist | Arts Fellow |
| 2006/07 | Joyce Campbell | Photographer | Arts Fellow |
| 2006/07 | Neil Dawson | Sculptor | Invited Artist |
| 2005/06 | Gareth Farr | Composer | Arts Fellow |
| 2005/06 | Megan Jenkinson | Photographer | Arts Fellow |
| 2004/05 | David Trubridge | Furniture Maker/Designer | Arts Fellow |
| 2004/05 | Kirsten Haydon | Jeweller | Arts Fellow |
| 2004/05 | Bernadette Hall | Poet | Arts Fellow (joint) |
| 2004/05 | Kathryn Madill | Painter | Arts Fellow (joint) |
| 2004/05 | Dick Frizzell | Painter | Invited Artist |
| 2003/04 | Grahame Sydney | Artist | Invited Artist |
| 2003/04 | Laurence Fearnley | Writer | Arts Fellow |
| 2003/04 | Patrick Shepherd | Composer/Teacher | Honorary Arts Fellow |
| 2003/04 | Andris Apse | Photographer | Honorary Arts Fellow |
| 2002/03 | Fieke Neuman | Fashion and Wearable Arts Designer | Arts Fellow |
| 2002/03 | Philip Dadson | Intermedia and Sound Artist | Arts Fellow |
| 2001/02 | Denise Copland | Printmaker | Arts Fellow |
| 2001/02 | Anne Noble | Photographer | Arts Fellow |
| 2001/02 | Richard Thompson | Painter | Arts Fellow |
| 2000/01 | Bronwyn Judge | Choreographer | Arts Fellow |
| 2000/01 | Raewyn Atkinson | Ceramicist | Arts Fellow |
| 2000/01 | Craig Potton | Photographer | Invited Artist |
| 1999/00 | Virginia King | Sculptor | Arts Fellow |
| 1999/00 | Chris Cree Brown | Composer | Arts Fellow |
| 1998/99 | Margaret Mahy | Children's writer | Arts Fellow |
| 1998/99 | Margaret Elliot | Painter | Arts Fellow |
| 1997/98 | Bill Manhire | Poet | Invited Artist |
| 1997/98 | Nigel Brown | Painter | Arts Fellow |
| 1997/98 | Chris Orsman | Poet | Arts Fellow |
| 1997/98 | Cameron Bennett, Ken Dorman, and Dave Comas | 60 Minutes, Media | With LEARNZ |
| 1991/92 | John Hamilton | Painter | Invited |
| 1990 | Kim Westerskov | Photographer | Invited Artist/Scientist |
| 1989/90 | Jonathan White | Painter | Invited |
| 1981/82 | Austen Deans | Painter | Invited |
| 1970 & 1974 | Maurice Conly | RNZAF official artist | Invited |
| 1957 & 1958/59 | Peter McIntyre | Painter | Invited |

== See also ==
- Antarctic Artists and Writers Program
