= Chevvy =

Chevvy may refer to:

- Chevvy Pennycook, an English rugby union player
- Chevvy Cooper, technical support for Australia national wheelchair rugby team

== See also ==
- Chevy, a derivative brand name for Chevrolet vehicles
