= Antarctic gateway cities =

Five major transportation hubs to Antarctica

The Antarctic gateway cities are five cities on the rim of the Southern Ocean through which nearly all cargo and personnel bound for Antarctica pass. From west to east, they are Punta Arenas, Chile; Ushuaia, Argentina; Cape Town, South Africa; Hobart, Australia; and Christchurch, New Zealand. As Antarctica is a low-resource environment with no major transportation infrastructure of its own, gateway cities are a necessary part of all Antarctic activities.

Each of the gateway cities accommodates both planes and ships traveling to Antarctica, and generally services the areas of the continent closest to them. The cities are used by both national Antarctic programs and Antarctic commercial tourism companies, although they differ in how much of each they facilitate. As a result of their status as transportation hubs, the cities also have cultural, economic, ecological, and political connections to Antarctica.

== History ==
=== Early Antarctic exploration ===
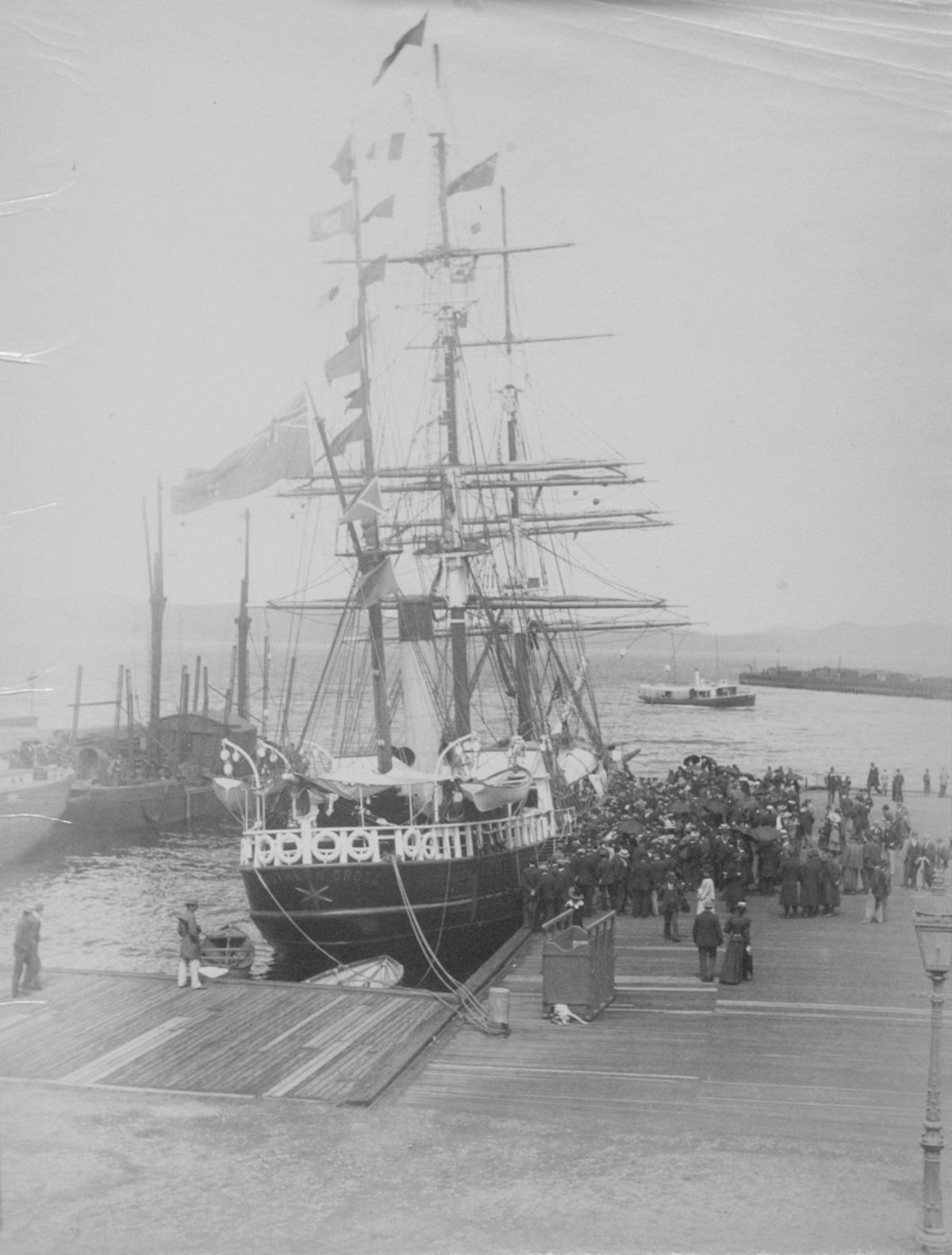
The Southern Cross docked in Hobart, Australia before its departure for Antarctica, December 17, 1898

In the 1820s when mainland Antarctica was first discovered, the current gateway cities didn't have the infrastructure to support expeditions so ships departed from more northerly ports such as Valparaíso, Chile and Sydney, Australia. The current gateway cities began establishing themselves as important Antarctic supply hubs around the turn of the 20th Century when several of the most notable Heroic Age expeditions first traveled through them, beginning with the British Southern Cross Expedition in 1898.

Heroic Age Expeditions through Antarctic Gateway Cities
Punta Arenas	Ushuaia	Cape Town	Hobart	Christchurch
Charcot's Second Antarctic Expedition (1908)	Charcot's First Antarctic Expedition (1904)	Discovery Expedition (first supply stop, 1901); Terra Nova Expedition (first supply stop, 1910)	Southern Cross Expedition (1898); Australian Antarctic Expedition (1911); Imperial Trans-Antarctic Expedition (first supply stop, 1914)	Discovery Expedition (second supply stop, 1901); Nimrod Expedition (1907); Terra Nova Expedition (second supply stop, 1910); Imperial Trans-Antarctic Expedition (second supply stop, 1914)

=== 21st century ===
Though the cities operated almost entirely independently through most of their history as Antarctic gateways, the cities have made efforts to build relationships with one another in the 21st century. In 2009, officials from each city met in Christchurch and signed a "Statement of Intent Between the Southern Rim Gateway Cities to Antarctica" to promote peaceful cooperation among the cities. The statement expired two and a half years later. From 2017 to 2020, an Australian-led project called Antarctic Cities recruited partners from each of the gateway cities to study their relationship with one another and with Antarctica. The project aimed to transition the cities from gateways, which participate in purely transportation activities, to custodial cities, which also participate in Antarctic stewardship activities. If geographic proximity to Antarctica is not considered necessary, other cities could also be called Antarctic gateways or become gateways in the future. For instance, Shanghai has a growing role through the Polar Research Institute of China and could potentially become recognized as a gateway city in the future.

== Public relationship to Antarctica ==
A 2020 survey found that roughly three-quarters of respondents from each of the gateway cities felt Antarctica was "very/fairly important to the city's identity." A majority of respondents also reported feeling "very/fairly responsible for Antarctica's future" and that it was important for their city to develop a relationship with Antarctica to promote better care for the environment. In recent years the cities have seen efforts by municipal officials to promote stronger relationships with the continent, such as Antarctic festivals, education programs for K-12 students, museum exhibits, and public outreach campaigns.

== Cities ==
=== Punta Arenas ===
Punta Arenas is located on the Southern Cone near the Antarctic Peninsula. More than 20 national Antarctic programs travel through Punta Arenas, more than any other gateway city. In 2016 the municipal government launched a project to increase infrastructure and promote a cultural connection to Antarctica.

=== Ushuaia ===
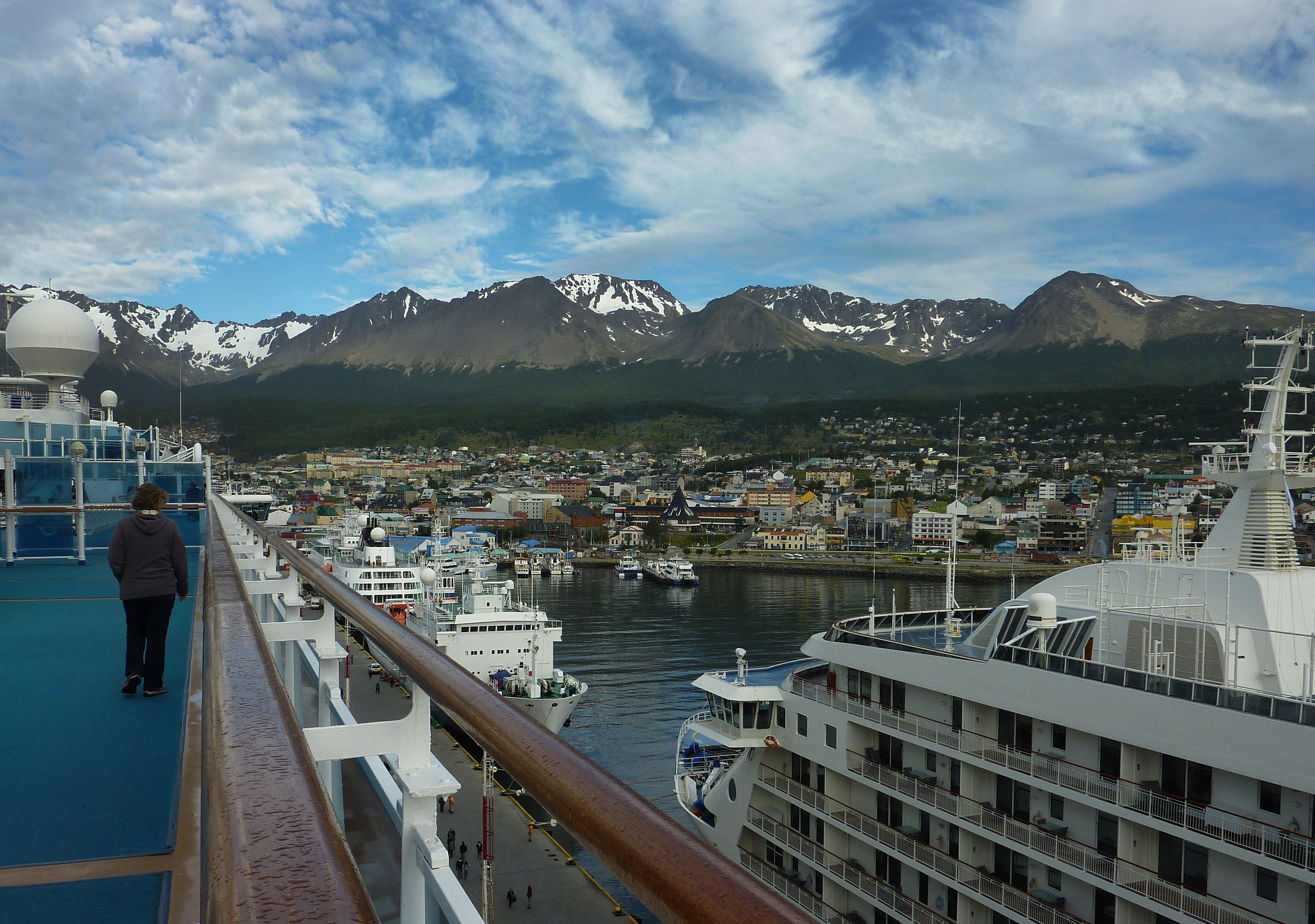
A view of Ushuaia from the deck of an Antarctic cruise ship

Ushuaia is the most southerly of the gateway cities and is located roughly 1000 km from the Antarctic Peninsula. Ushuaia is by far the most popular gateway city for tourism to Antarctica, accounting for 90% of all tourists to the continent. Nearly all of the passengers departing Ushuaia for Antarctica travel by cruise ship. It services Argentina's own National Antarctic Directorate, but no other national Antarctic program. It is also home to Antarctic-related tourism attractions, such as the Antarctic Museum.

=== Cape Town ===
Cape Town is the largest of the gateway cities and the farthest from Antarctica. In addition to South Africa's own national Antarctic program, the programs of Russia, Germany, Belgium, Norway, and Japan also reach Antarctica via Cape Town. As of 2021, tourism company White Desert has offered direct commercial flights from Cape Town to Antarctica.

=== Hobart ===
Hobart services the national Antarctic programs of Australia, France, and China. Hobart offers the least transportation to Antarctica among the gateway cities, but has the highest number of Antarctic scientists. It also houses several Antarctic policy and research organizations including the Convention for the Conservation of Antarctic Marine Living Resources, the Institute for Marine and Antarctic Studies at the University of Tasmania, the Tasmanian Polar Network, and Antarctica Tasmania. It also hosts Antarctic museum exhibits and an annual Australian Antarctic Festival.

=== Christchurch ===
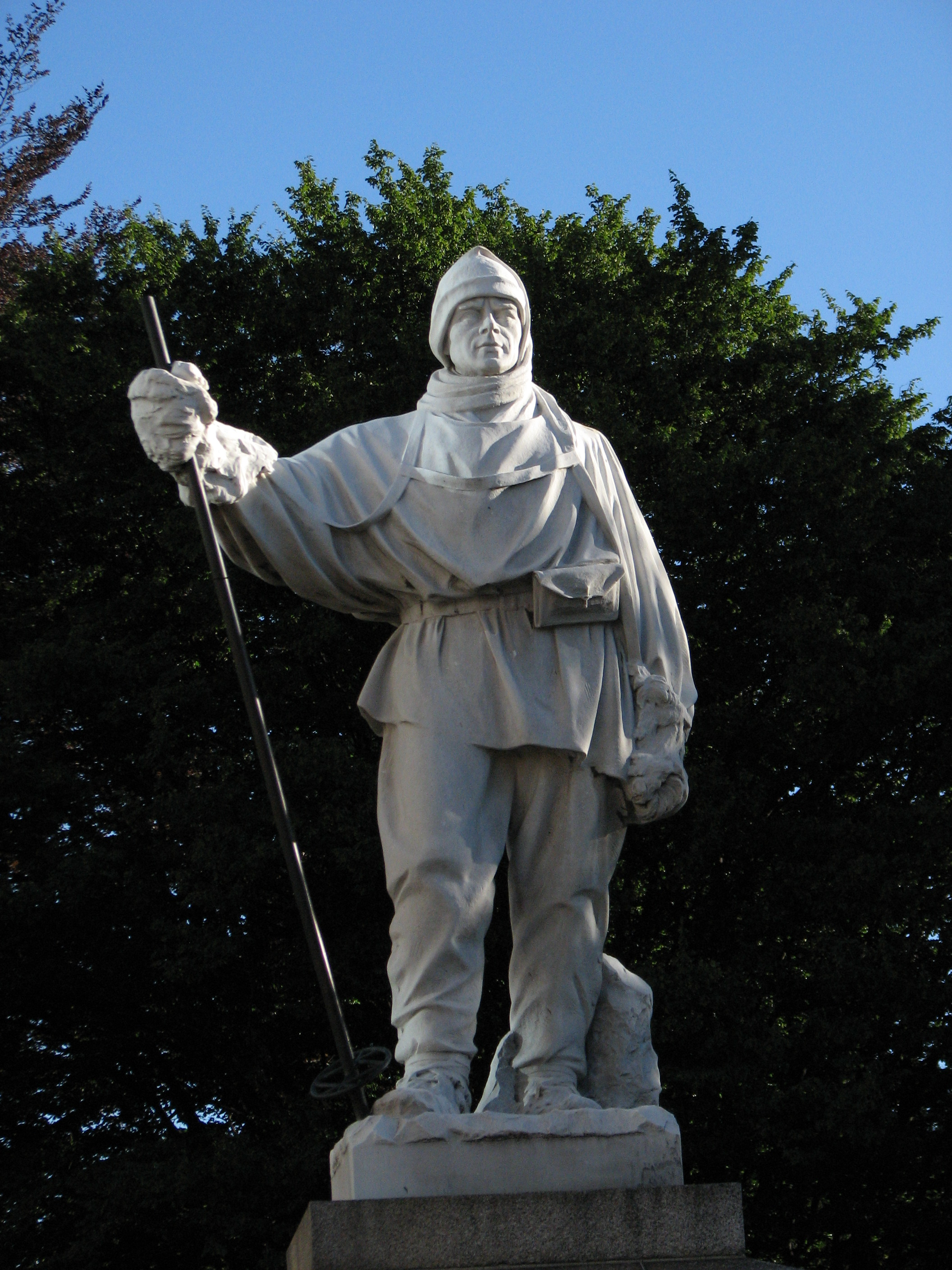
A statue of Robert Falcon Scott in Christchurch. Scott traveled through Christchurch on his Discovery and Terra Nova expeditions.

Christchurch offers almost no commercial travel to Antarctica, but it is a logistics center for the national Antarctic programs of New Zealand, the United States, Italy, and South Korea. Christchurch also houses the headquarters for the Council of Members of National Antarctic Programs, an international organization comprising representatives from each of the governmental research programs operating in Antarctica. In addition to its services for national Antarctic programs, Christchurch is home to several locations and events for the local public. These include the International Antarctic Centre, the Christchurch Antarctic Office, an annual Antarctic festival called Days of Ice, and many permanent museum exhibits. The local University of Canterbury houses Gateway Antarctica, a center for Antarctic studies and research.
