= Scott's Hut =

- Antarctic base
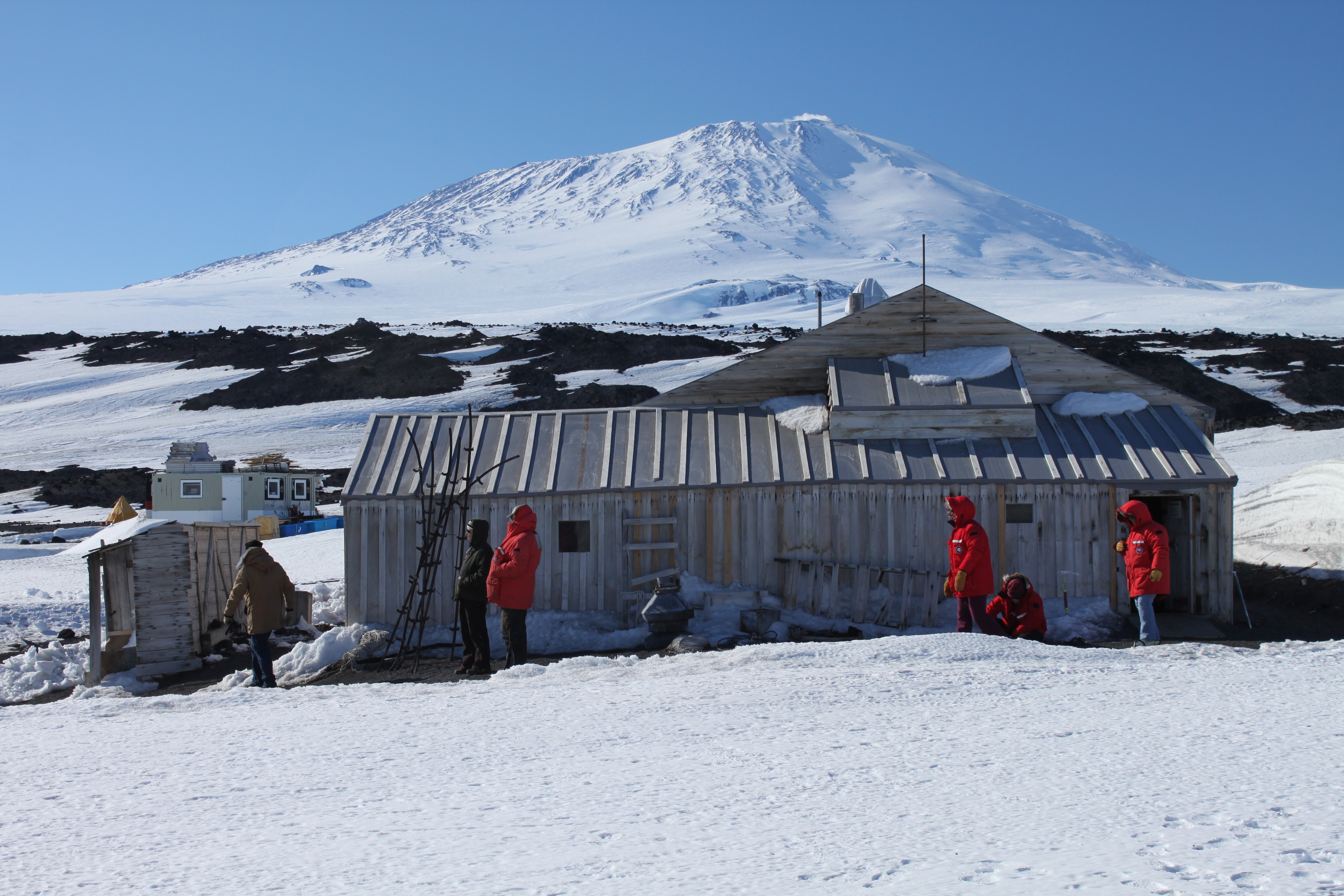
- Antarctica Delta Trip to Cape Evans Scott's Hut

- Location of Scott's Hut in Antarctica
- Coordinates: 77°38′10″S 166°25′04″E
- Country: New Zealand
- Location in Antarctica: Cape Evans; Ross Island; Antarctica
- Administered by: Terra Nova Expedition
- Established: 18 January 1918; 108 years ago
- Named after: Captain Robert Falcon Scott

Population
  - Total: Up to 25
- Type: All year-round
- Period: Annual
- Status: Restored and preserved

Scott's Hut is a building located on the north shore of Cape Evans on Ross Island in Antarctica. It was erected in 1911 by the British Antarctic Expedition of 1910–1913 (also known as the Terra Nova Expedition) led by Robert Falcon Scott.

In selecting a base of operations for the 1910–1913 Expedition, Scott rejected the notion of reoccupying the hut he had built by McMurdo Sound during the Discovery Expedition of 1901–1904. This first hut was located at Hut Point, 20 km south of Cape Evans. Two factors influenced this decision. One was that the original hut was extremely cold for living quarters and the other was that Scott's ship, the Discovery, had been trapped by sea ice at Hut Point, a problem he hoped to avoid by establishing his new base farther north.

Some confusion arises because the Discovery Hut can technically be referred to as Scott's hut, in that his expedition built it, and it was his base ashore during the 1901–1904 expedition. But the title Scott's Hut popularly belongs to the building erected in 1911 at Cape Evans.

== Description ==
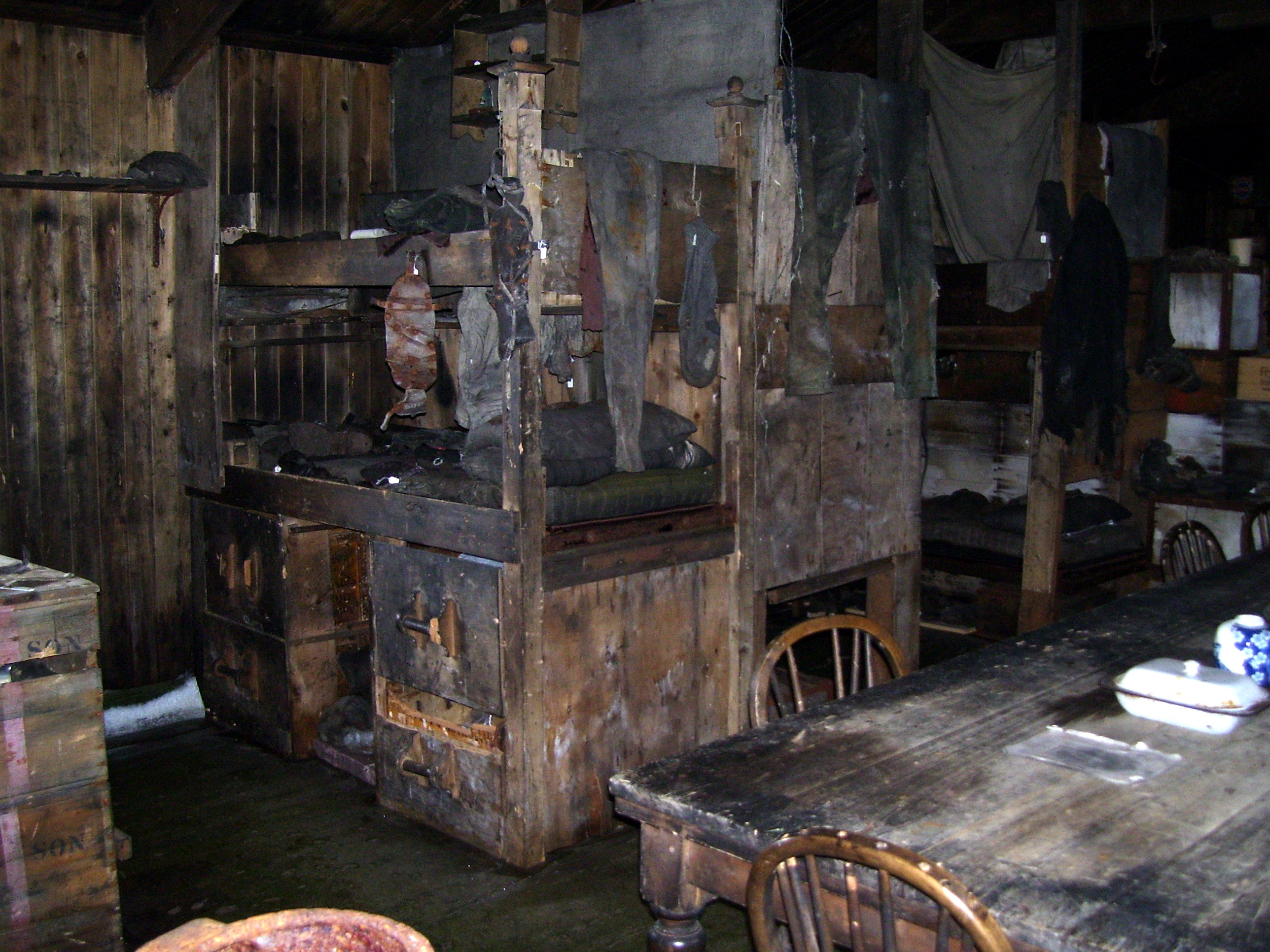
Interior showing beds

Scott's Hut was prefabricated in England before being brought south by ship. It is rectangular, 50 feet (15 m) long and 25 feet (7.6 m) wide. Insulation was provided by seaweed sewn into a quilt, placed between double-planked inner and outer walls. The roof was a sandwich of three layers of plank and two layers of rubber ply enclosing more quilted seaweed. Lighting was provided by acetylene gas, and heating came from the kitchen and a supplementary coal-burning stove.

Apsley Cherry-Garrard wrote that the hut was divided into separate areas for sleeping and working by a bulkhead made of boxes of stores. A stables building (for nineteen Siberian ponies), approximately 50 by 16 feet (15.2 by 4.9 m), was subsequently attached to the north wall of the main building. A utility room, approximately 40 by 12 feet (12.2 by 3.7 m), was also added later, built around the original small porch at the southwest end of the main building.

Considerable effort was made to insulate the building, and to extract the maximum amount of heat from the flues from the stove and the heater, based on lessons learned from the Discovery Hut. Terra Nova expeditioners described the hut as being warm to the point of being uncomfortable.

A cross is erected on a hill behind Scott's Hut at Cape Evans, but this is not connected to Captain Scott, having been erected in memory of the three members of Shackleton's later Ross Sea Party expedition, who died nearby. The cross erected in memory of Captain Scott and his polar companions is to be found atop Observation Hill.

== Use of Scott's Hut ==
During the winter of 1911, 25 men of the Terra Nova shore party lived in the hut. From here Scott and his men set out on the ultimately fatal trek to the South Pole. Following the failure of Scott's southern party to return, several men remained behind for a further winter (1912) in order to search for the bodies the next spring. In 1913, with the Terra Nova expedition over, it was left well supplied with stores in the way of food and oil, and a certain amount of coal.

The hut was reused from 1915 to 1917 by several of Shackleton's Ross Sea party after the Aurora, which was to have been the permanent winter quarters, broke adrift in May 1915, and went north with the ice, unable to return. The hut became the permanent living quarters for the ten marooned men, and thanks to the stores, they were able to sustain life in comparative comfort, supplementing these stores from Shackleton's Hut at Cape Royds. In January 1917, after Shackleton had rescued the survivors, he had the hut put in order and locked up.

Although abandoned from 1917, the hut and its contents are remarkably well preserved today due to the consistently sub-freezing conditions.

== Preservation and decay at Scott's Hut ==
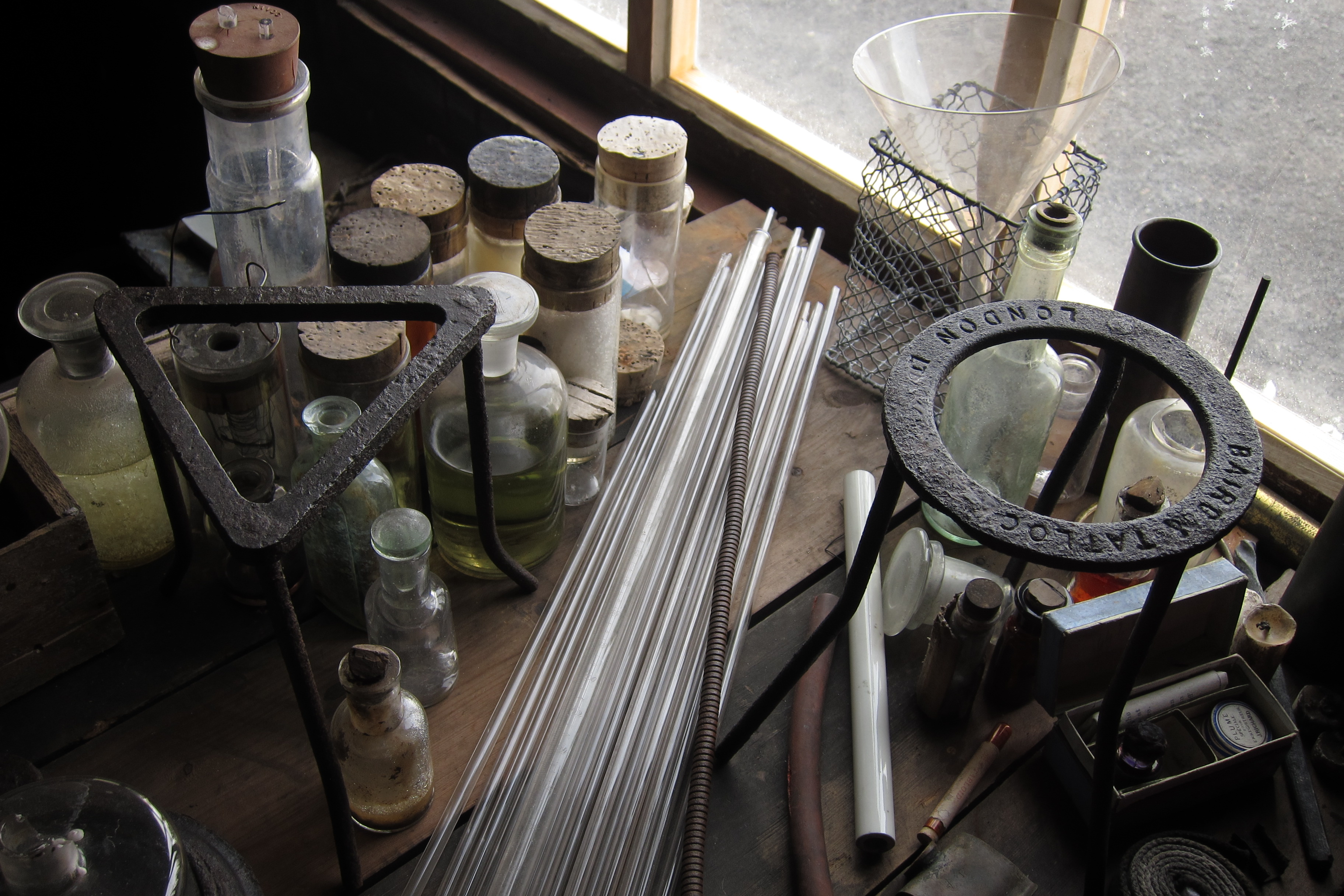
Scientific instruments located inside the hut, as they appeared in 2013.

After 1917, the hut remained untouched until 1956, when US expeditioners dug it out of the snow and ice. It was found to be in a remarkable state of preservation, and included many artifacts from both the earlier expeditions. While some artifacts were taken as souvenirs at the time (and since), this hut has remained largely as it was in 1917.

New Zealand and the UK have undertaken responsibility at various times since the 1970s to restore (largely by removing snow and ice) both Scott's hut and Discovery Hut.

While the preservation of food in the freezing temperatures and dry climate has been noted, bacterial decay still occurs. Visitors describe the seal meat preserved at the Discovery Hut as smelling 'quite rancid', and some have expressed concerns that the fabric of these huts are being affected by fungal decay.

In 2016 there was a preservation project, by photographic and laser measurements for the entire house and the surrounding area. This data was then used to build a 3D model, which is open for public virtual tour.

== Historic site ==
Both Scott's Hut and Shackleton's Hut have been included on the World Monuments Watch. Shackleton's was included in 2004 and 2006, and Scott's in 2008.

The hut has been designated an Antarctic Historic Site or Monument (HSM 16), following a proposal by New Zealand and the United Kingdom to the Antarctic Treaty Consultative Meeting.

== See also ==
- List of Antarctic expeditions
- List of organizations based in Antarctica
- Winter Quarters Bay
- Research stations in Antarctica
- List of Antarctic field camps
