= Stuart Robertson =

Stuart or Stewart Robertson may refer to:

- Stuart A. Robertson (1918–2005), co-founder of Milliman, Inc., an actuarial and business consulting firm
- Stuart Robertson (gardener) (1944–2009), professional gardener from Montreal, Quebec
- Stuart Robertson (footballer, born 1946), English footballer who played centre half
- Stuart Robertson (cricketer) (born 1947), former Zimbabwean first class cricketer
- Stewart Robertson (born 1948), Scottish composer
- Stuart Robertson (footballer, born 1959), Scottish footballer who played in the Football League and the Scottish Football League
- Stuart Robertson (visual effects artist), American visual effects artist
- Stuart Robertson (photographer) (born 1969), New Zealand photographer

== See also ==
- Robertson (surname)
