= List of organizations based in Antarctica =

This is a list of organizations based in Antarctica.

== Organizations based in Antarctica ==
- Antarctic and Southern Ocean Coalition

=== Antarctic agencies ===
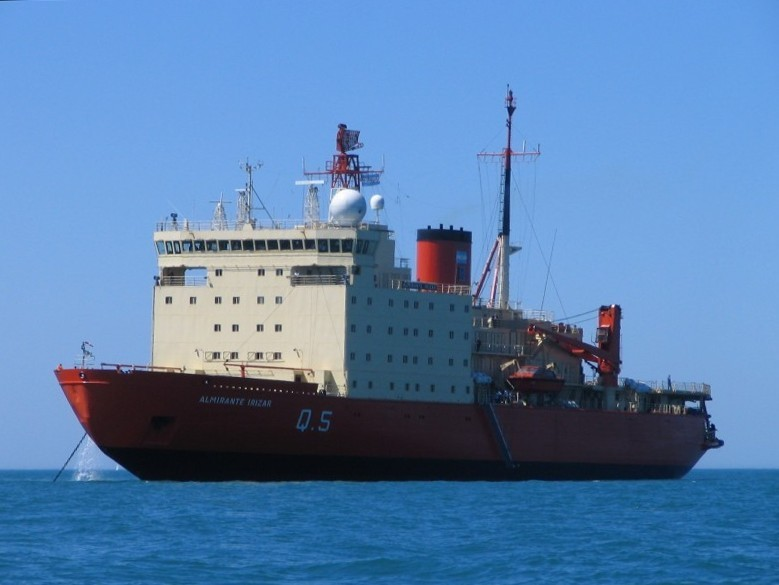
The icebreaker Almirante Irizar has been the principal supply line for Argentine bases in Antarctica since 1978.

- Antarctica New Zealand
- Argentine Antarctic Program
- Australian Antarctic Division
- Brazilian Antarctic Program
- British Antarctic Survey
- Instituto Antártico Argentino
- Instituto Antártico Chileno
- IPEV French Polar Institute
- National Antarctic Research Program
- New Zealand Antarctic Place-Names Committee
- Norwegian Polar Institute
- Tasmanian polar network
- United States Antarctic Program

=== Museums in Antarctica ===
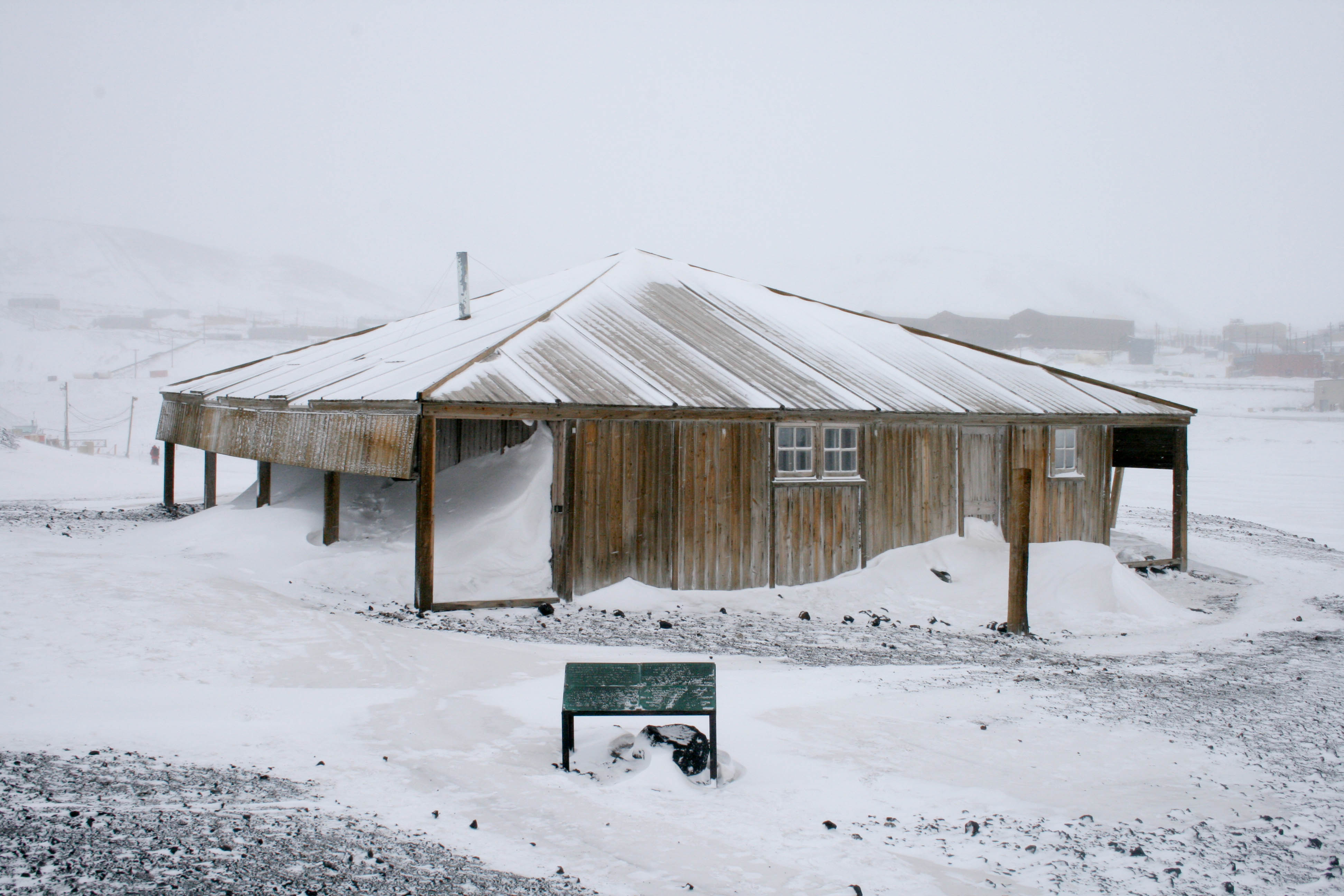
Discovery Hut in 2008. It was erected in 1902 by Robert Falcon Scott's 1903–1907 Discovery expedition.

- Discovery Hut
- Port Lockroy base
- Scott's Hut
- South Georgia Museum

== See also ==
- Scouting in the Antarctic
