= Argentine Antarctic Program =

Argentina was one of the twelve original signatories of the Antarctic Treaty which was signed on December 1, 1959, and came in force on 21 June 1961.

Argentina's scientific activities started at the beginning of the twentieth century when an Argentine named José María Sobral joined the Swedish South Polar Expedition (1901–1904) commanded by Otto Nordenskjold, which wintered two years in Antarctica. In 1904, W. S. Bruce, leader of the Scottish National Antarctic Expedition, turned over to Argentina the meteorological and geomagnetic observatory on Laurie Island, South Orkney Island which had been established in the previous year. Since then the observatory has been run by Argentina and is the location of the Orcadas Station. It claims to be the first permanent facility south of 60° Southern latitude.

The Argentine Antarctic Program is composed of several organizations forming the highest levels of the National Government. Logistics are provided by the Argentine Army, under the Defense Ministry, whereas all other activities are ruled by the Direccion Nacional del Antartico– ‘Instituto Anta´rtico Argentino’ of the Ministry of Foreign Affairs. The Instituto Antartico Argentino (IAA) was created under the Decree Nº 7338 on April 17, 1951, and is the first organization in the world to be exclusively devoted to Antarctic research.

== Mission, research and logistics ==
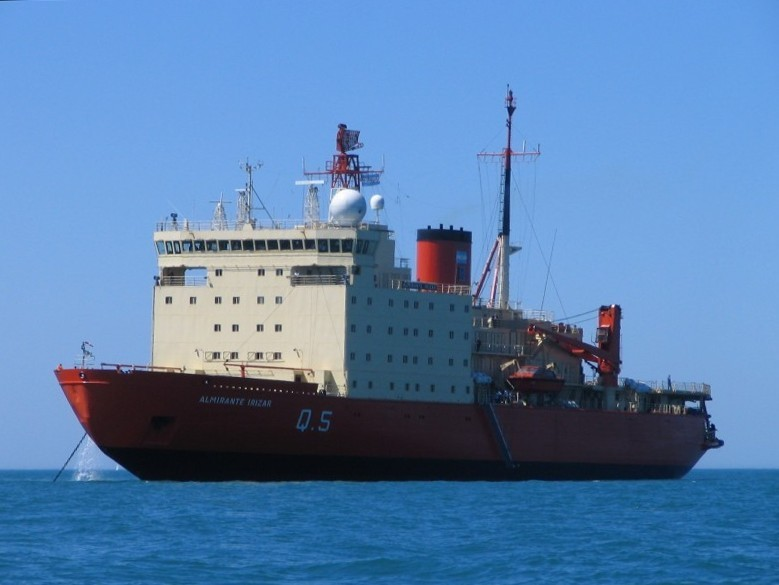
The icebreaker Almirante Irizar, the principal supply line for Argentine bases in Antarctica since 1978

The purpose of the Argentine Antarctic Program is to support, strengthen, and increase the Argentine sovereign claims over the portion of the Antarctic continent and surrounding seas from 25W to 74 W and from 60S to the Pole.

The science program is run by the Instituto Antartico Argentino (IAA). The scientific priorities were set according to the National Antarctic Policy to investigate, understand, and preserve natural resources, to protect the environment, and to maintain the historical monuments. IAA is divided into scientific departments grouped into three major areas: Life sciences, Earth sciences, and Ocean and Atmospheric sciences.

The Argentine Navy operates a large icebreaker named Almirante Irizar, an oceanographic vessel (Puerto Deseado) and several smaller patrol vessels. Air operations from South America and within Antarctica is provided by the Argentine Air Force through several C-130 Hercules planes, a small DHC-6 Twin Otter plane year round based on Marambio Station, and Bell 212 helicopters deployed in Marambio Station during the summer.

== Research stations ==
Argentina is the closest country to Antarctica and runs six permanent scientific stations, the most of any country. They are:

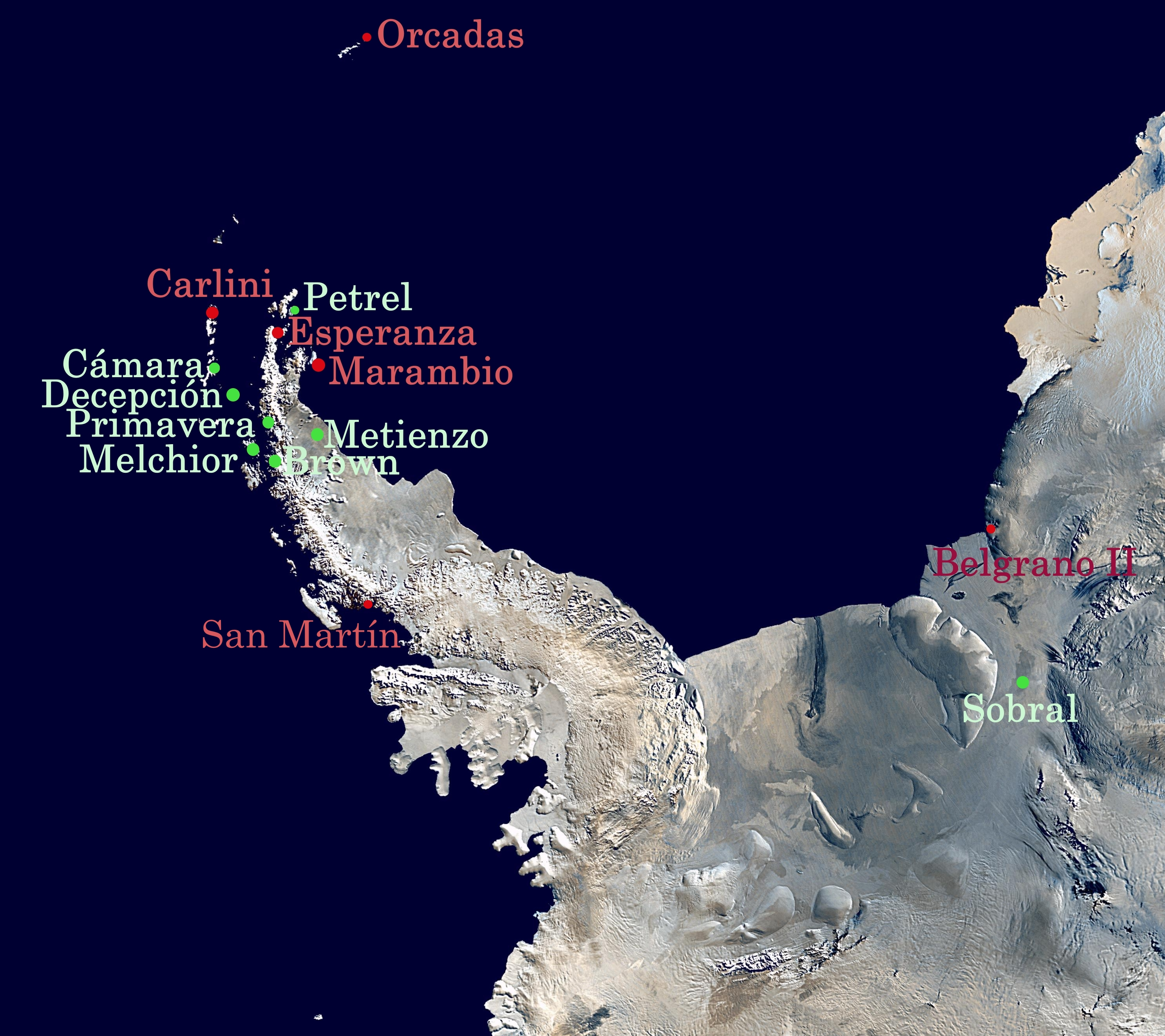
Map depicting Argentine bases in Antarctica (permanent in red)

- Orcadas Base (60º44'S 44º44'W). Located on Laurie Island, South Orkney Islands. Operational on February 22, 1904.
- Carlini Base (62º14'S 58º40'W). Located on King George (25 de Mayo) Island, South Shetland Islands. Operational on December 17, 1952.
- Esperanza Base (63º24'S 56º59'W). Located on Hope Bay, northern tip of the Antarctic Peninsula. Operational on December 17, 1952.
- Marambio Base (64º14'S 56º38'W). Located on Seymour (Marambio) Island, northwestern Weddell Sea. Operational on October 29, 1969.
- San Martín Base (68º08'S 67º06'W). Located on Barry Island, Margarite Bay. Operational on March 21, 1951.
- Belgrano II Base (77º51'S 34º33'W). Located on Coats Land, Bertrab Nunatak, southeastern Weddell Sea. Operational on February 5, 1979.

Orcadas Station is the oldest Argentine station in the Antarctic, and Marambio the newest.

Additionally, Argentina maintains seven seasonal (nonpermanent) stations:

- Almirante Brown (64º52'S 62º54'W). Located on Paradise Cove. Operational on April 6, 1951
- Primavera (64º09'S 60º58'W). Located on Danco Coast, Gerlache Strait. Operational on March 8, 1977
- Decepción (62_59 S, 60_41 W). Located on 1° de Mayo Bay, Port Foster, Deception Island, South Shetland Islands. Operational on January 25, 1948
- Melchior (64_20 S, 62_59 W). Located on Gamma Island, Melchior Archipelago. Operational on March 31, 1947.
- Matienzo (64_58 S, 60_08 W). Located on Larsen Nunatak, Larsen Ice Shelf, Weddell Sea. Operational on March 15, 1961.
- Cámara (62_36 S, 59_54 W). Located on Half Moon Island, MacFarlane Strait, South Shetland Islands. Operational on April 1, 1953.
- Petrel (63_28 S, 56_12 W). Located on Dundee Island, Welchness Cape, Antarctic Strait. Operational in December 1952.

== See also ==
- List of organizations based in Antarctica
- Argentine Antarctica
