= AWIPEV Arctic Research Station =

Research station on the Svalbard archipelago of Norway

AWIPEV
- AWIPEV Arctic Research Station
- Location within Arctic
- Coordinates: 78°55′30″N 11°55′20″E
- Country: Norway
- Administered by: AWI; IPEV
- Activities: Atmospheric Sciences; Permafrost studies; Glaciology; Balloon soundings; Biology; Satellite telecommunication
- Established: 2003

Population
  - Total: Ny-Alesund max capacity : 180; AWIPEV max capacity: 40
- Type: All Year-round
- Period: Annual
- Status: Operational

The AWIPEV Arctic Research Station is located in the arctic, on the Svalbard archipelago of Norway. The station is part of the research base of Ny-Ålesund, owned and managed by Kings Bay AS. Researchers from more than 10 countries are based here. The AWIPEV station is leased and operated by the French Polar Institute (IPEV) and its German counterpart, the Alfred Wegener Institute for Polar and Marine Research (AWI).

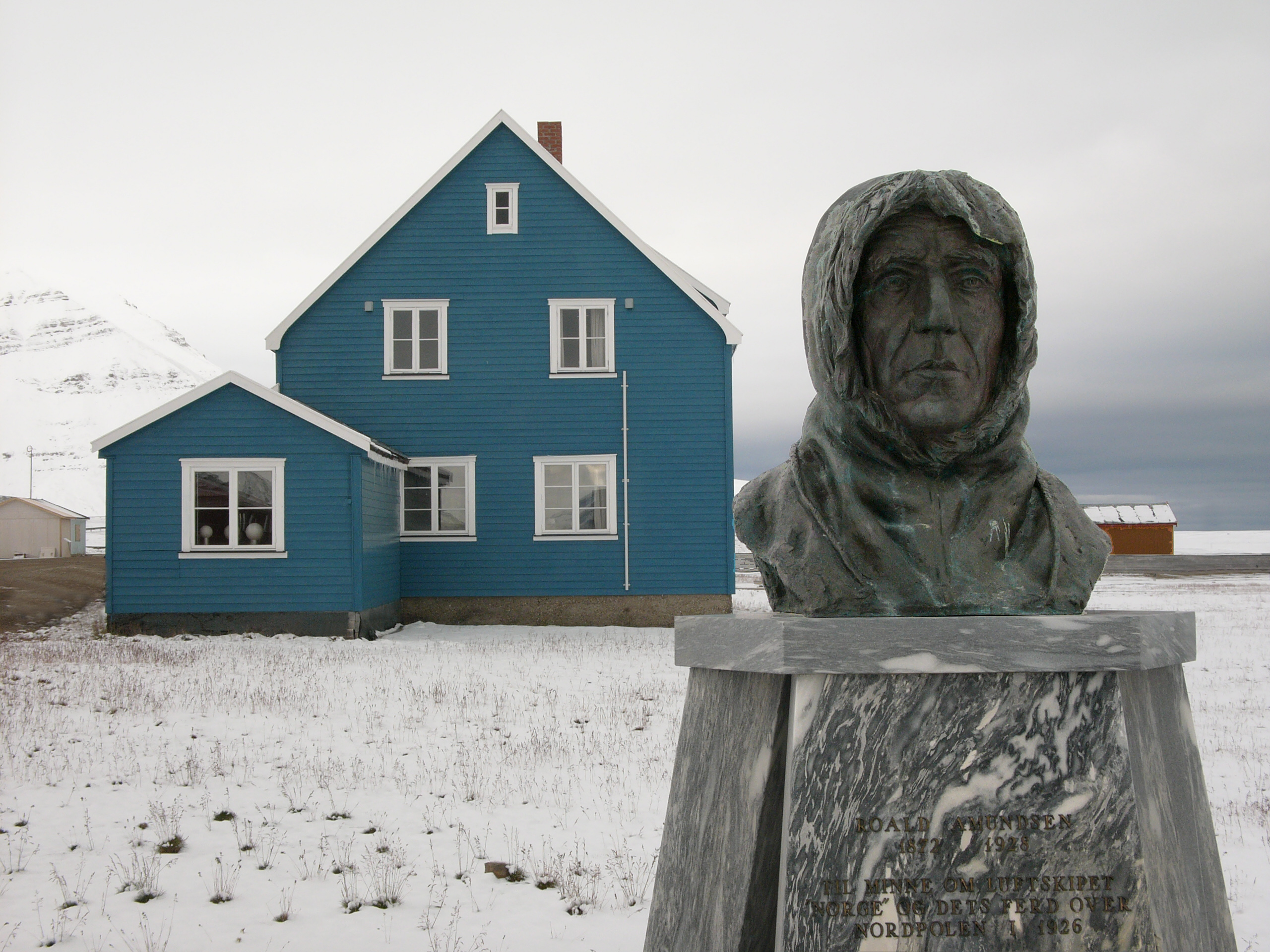
AWIPEV "Blue House", administrative building and temporary staff housing

== History ==
The AWIPEV station is founded in 2003 by IPEV and AWI. At the time, IPEV was managing the French Arctic stations of Rabot and Corbel, AWI was managing the German station Koldewey. In order to increase French-German cooperation in the Arctic, making bi-national projects and sharing the logistics, both polar institutes decided to merge their resources and create the first German-French bi-national polar station. AWIPEV can host up to 40 people. The maximum capacity at Ny-Alesund is 180 persons.

== Infrastructures & Facilities ==
The AWIPEV research station disposes of several buildings:

- The "Blue House" : base leader office, guest rooms and offices
- Rabot building : Logistics engineer office, workshop, guest rooms
- Atmospheric Observatory: Observatory engineer office, LIDARs, Instruments roof bay
- Sounding balloon house
- Corbel Station
- Champ antennas
- Snow scooters garage
