= Denise Copland =

New Zealand artist

Denise Copland (born 1952) is a New Zealand artist, born in Timaru. Her works are held in the permanent collections of Auckland Art Gallery Toi o Tāmaki and Museum of New Zealand Te Papa Tongarewa.

Copland graduated with a Diploma of Fine Arts with Honours in Printmaking from Ilam School of Fine Arts in Christchurch in 1977, and prior to that a Certificate of Graphic Design from Christchurch Polytechnic Institute of Technology in 1971.

== Career ==
Copland's practice focuses on the intersection of humans and natural ecosystems, and the concerns of our changing planet. She has exhibited her prints throughout New Zealand, and has had works included in many international group exhibitions. From 1982 to 1984, Copland lectured at the Ilam School of Fine Arts. She also a senior lecturer in the School of Art and Design at Christchurch Polytechnic Institute of Technology until 2006.

== Notable exhibitions ==
- Denise Copland: Implantations, Christchurch Art Gallery, Christchurch (1991) - a collection of 23 prints exploring the changes wrought in New Zealand forestry by human beings.
- A Standing Place, Christchurch Art Gallery, Christchurch (2004) - this solo show was Copland's response to her Antarctic expedition, and included prints and three-dimensional objects such as flags. The show was dedicated to Ernest Shackleton.
- Melt, University Art Gallery, Sydney (2009) - a group show with Lesley Duxbury and Kirsten Haydon. This show explored the three artists' responses to residencies in the polar regions.
- Shared Lines; Sendai x Christchurch Art Exchange, Christchurch (2012) - a group exhibition featuring and artist exchange in response to the earthquakes that devastated Canterbury, New Zealand and Fukushima, Japan.

== Awards ==
- Artist-in-residence at the Otago Polytechnic School of Art in 1985.
- Antarctic Arts Fellowship in 2001-2002 - also known as Artists to Antarctica. Copland devised her own chemicals, printing media and techniques using her small home freezer to test the processes she wanted to use in Antarctica.
