= French Polar Institute =

French organization leading France's National Antarctic Program

French Polar Institute Paul-Émile Victor
- Institut polaire français Paul-Émile Victor
- Abbreviation: IPEV
- Formation: January 1992
- Legal status: Government organization
- Purpose: Polar research
- Location: Plouzané, Finistère
- Region served: France
- Director: Yves Frenot
- Parent organisation: French Ministry of Higher Education and Research
- Website: institut-polaire.fr

The French Polar Institute Paul-Émile Victor (French: Institut polaire français Paul-Émile Victor, IPEV) is the organization leading the French National Antarctic Program since 1992.

Based in Plouzané, Finistère, it operates the Dumont d'Urville Station and jointly operates the Concordia Station with the Italians and the AWIPEV Arctic Research Station with the Germans.

It also supports activities at the Martin de Viviés scientific station on Île Amsterdam.

== See also ==
- List of organizations based in Antarctica
