= National Antarctic Program =

Government operated or supported program

A national Antarctic program is any government operated or supported program which is mandated with managing the support of scientific research and contributing to the governance and protection of the Antarctic environment on behalf of its nation and in the spirit of the Antarctic Treaty. The Antarctic Treaty, the international agreement that regulates Antarctic activity, has been signed by 54 countries. Of those, 38 have national Antarctic programs. 33 of these programs have a permanent presence in Antarctica and are members of Council of Managers of National Antarctic Programs (COMNAP). Four countries have no permanent presence in Antarctica, but have programs that are observers to COMNAP. Only one country, Pakistan, maintains a national Antarctic program with no affiliation to COMNAP.

== List of programs ==
Program Name	Operating Country	Number of Active Research Stations	COMNAP Status
Dirección Nacional del Antártico	Argentina	13	Member
Australian Antarctic Division	Australia	3	Member
National Academy of Sciences	Belarus	1	Member
Belgian Federal Science Policy and Polar Secretariat	Belgium	1	Member
Programa Antártico Brasileiro	Brazil	1	Member
Bulgarian Antarctic Institute	Bulgaria	1	Member
Instituto Antártico Chileno	Chile	9	Member
Chinese Arctic and Antarctic Administration & Polar Research Institute of China	China	4	Member
Masaryk University	Czech Republic	1	Member
Instituto Oceanográfico y Antartico de la Armada	Ecuador	1	Member
Finnish Antarctic Research Program at the Finnish Meteorological Institute	Finland	1	Member
Institut Polaire Français Paul-Émile Victor	France	1 independently operated, 1 jointly operated with Italy	Member
Alfred Wegener Institute	Germany	3	Member
National Centre for Polar & Ocean Research	India	2	Member
Programma Nazionale Di Ricerche in Antartide	Italy	1 independently operated, 1 jointly operated with France	Member
National Institute of Polar Research	Japan	1	Member
Netherlands Organization for Scientific Research	Netherlands	1 laboratory attached to the British Rothera Station	Member
Antarctica New Zealand	New Zealand	1	Member
Norwegian Polar Institute	Norway	1	Member
Division of Antarctic Affairs	Peru	1	Member
Poland Institute of Biochemistry and Biophysics, Polish Academy of Sciences	Poland	1	Member
The Arctic and Antarctic Research Institute and the Russian Antarctic Expedition	Russia	10	Member
South African National Antarctic Programme	South Africa	1	Member
Korean Polar Research Institute	South Korea	2	Member
Comité Polar Español	Spain	2 stations, 1 permanent field camp	Member
Swedish Polar Research Secretariat	Sweden	1	Member
TÜBITAK Marmara Research Center, Polar Research Institute	Turkey	1	Member
National Antarctic Scientific Centre of Ukraine	Ukraine	1	Member
British Antarctic Survey	United Kingdom	3	Member
National Science Foundation Office of Polar Programs	United States	3	Member
Uruguayan Antarctic Institute	Uruguay	2	Member
Polar Knowledge Canada	Canada	0	Member
Colombian Ocean Commission	Colombia	0	Observer
Sultan Mizan Antarctic Research Foundation	Malaysia	0	Observer
Programa Polar Português	Portugal	0	Member
Swiss Committee on Polar and High Altitude Research	Switzerland	0	Observer
Venezuelan Institute for Scientific Research	Venezuela	0	Observer
National Institute of Oceanography	Pakistan	0	Non-member
