= Discovery Hut =

- Antarctic camp
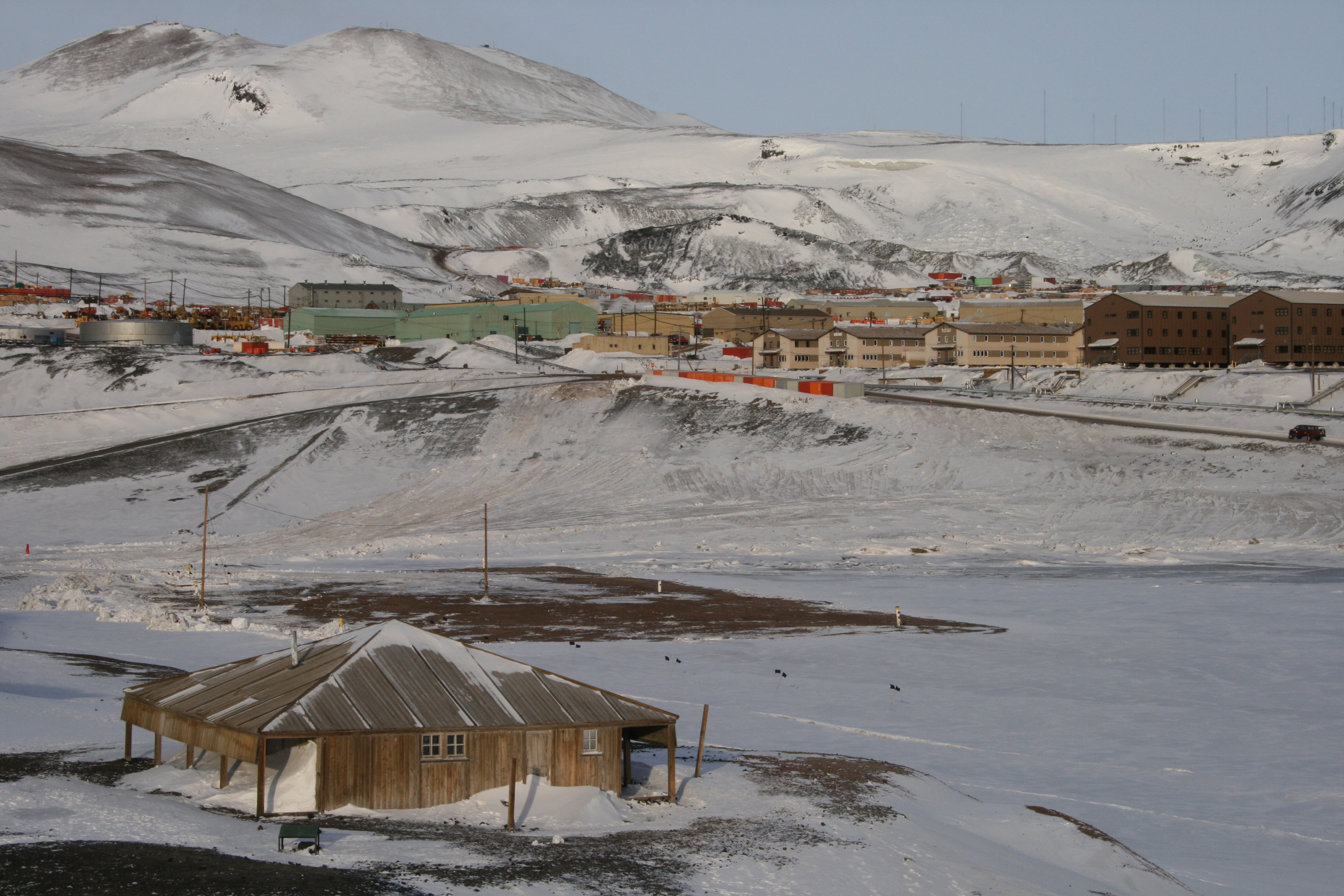
- Scott's Discovery Hut and McMurdo Station at Ross Island

- Location of Discovery Hut in Antarctica
- Coordinates: 77°50′45″S 166°38′30″E
- Country: United Kingdom
- Location in Antarctica: Hut Point Peninsula; Ross Island; McMurdo Sound; Antarctica
- Administered by: Discovery Expedition
- Established: 1901
- Type: All-year round
- Period: Annual
- Status: Restored and preserved

Discovery Hut was built by Robert Falcon Scott during the Discovery Expedition of 1901–1904 in 1902 and is located at Hut Point on Ross Island by McMurdo Sound, Antarctica. Visitors to Antarctica, arriving at either the US Base at McMurdo or New Zealand's Scott Base are likely to encounter Discovery Hut as both are located on Hut Point. Discovery Hut is just 300m from McMurdo Base. The hut has been designated a Historic Site or Monument (HSM 18), following a proposal by New Zealand and the United Kingdom to the Antarctic Treaty Consultative Meeting.

Some confusion arises because Discovery Hut can technically be referred to as Scott's hut, in that his expedition built it, and it was his base ashore during the 1901–1904 expedition, but the title Scott's Hut popularly belongs to the building erected in 1911 at Cape Evans.

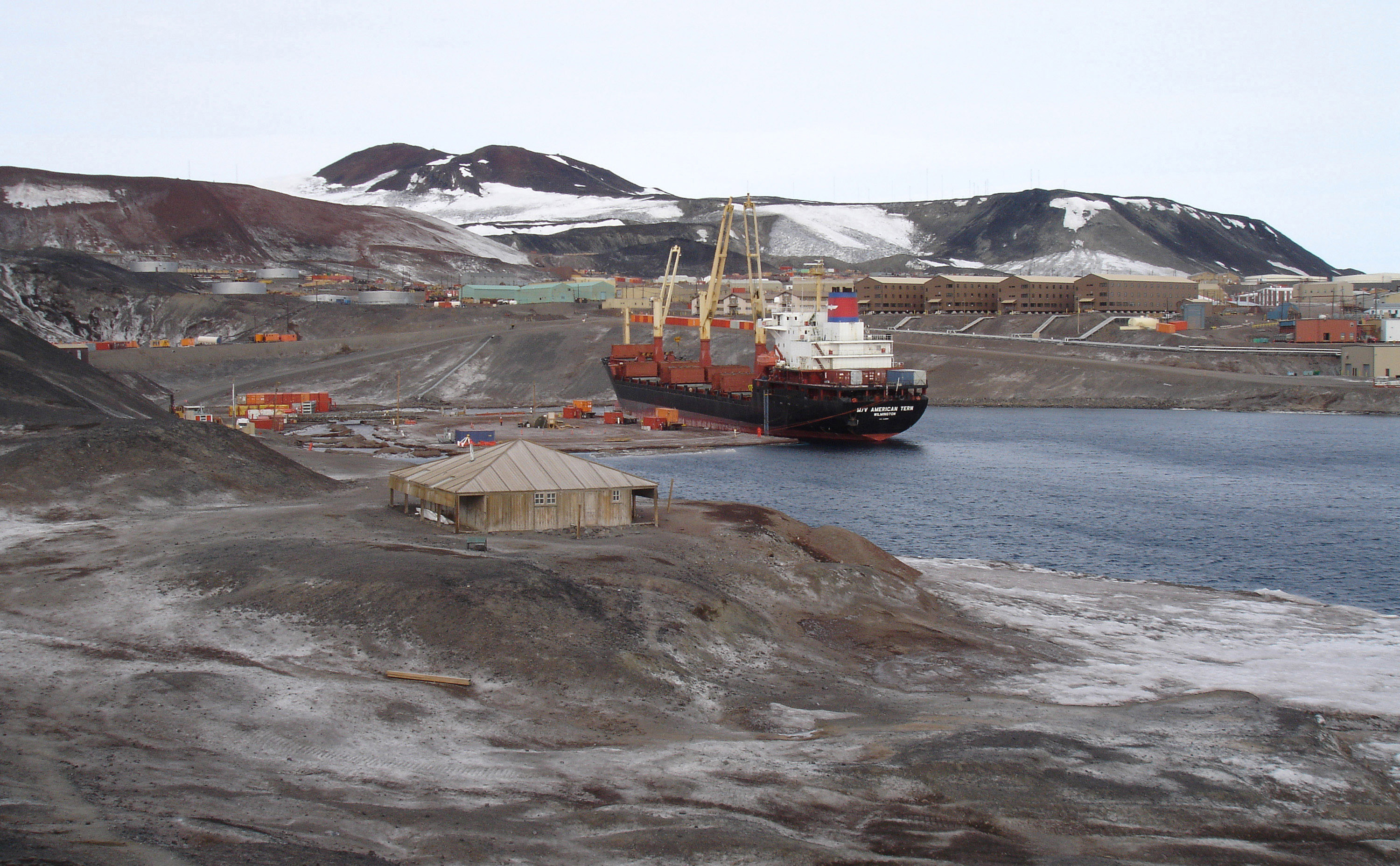
Discovery Hut, 2007 at Ross Island, Antarctica. Photo shot from Hut Point with McMurdo Station in the background.

== History ==
=== British National Antarctic Expedition 1901-1904 ===
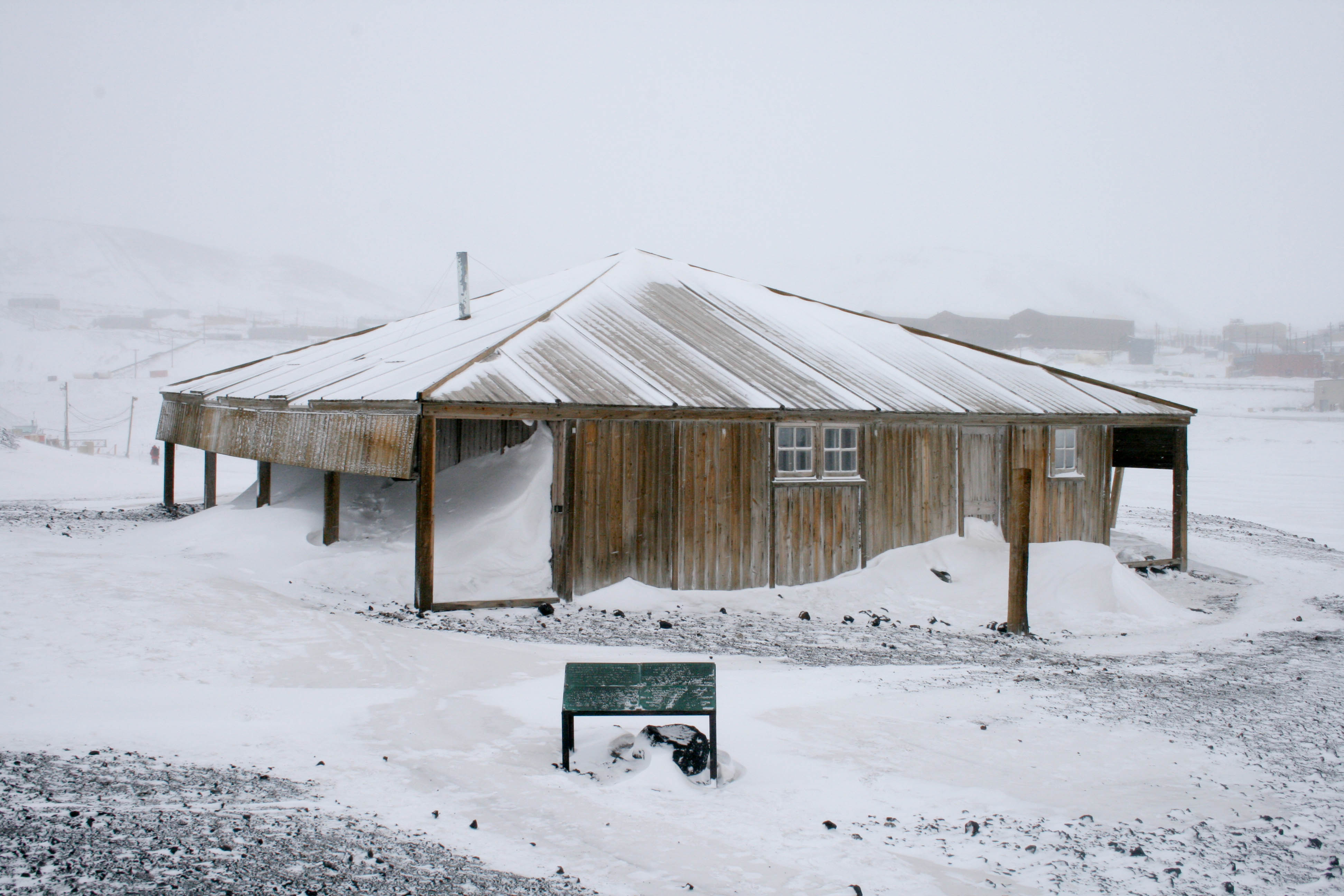
Discovery Hut in 2008. It was erected in 1902 by Robert Falcon Scott's 1903-1907 Discovery Expedition.

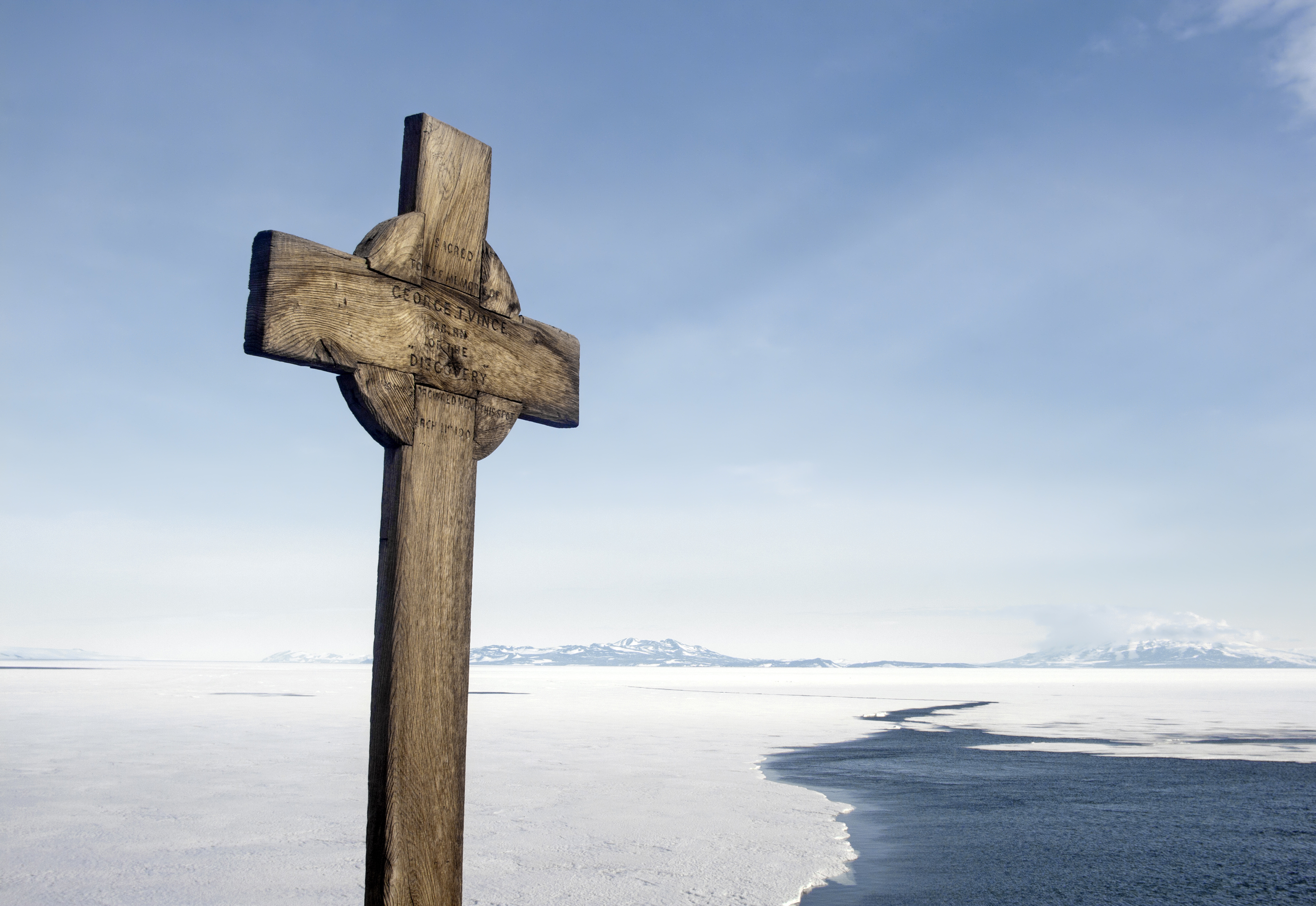
George Vince's Cross

Discovery Hut was designed by Professor Gregory, (appointed as leader of the scientific staff, he resigned before the Discovery headed south) and prefabricated by James Moore of Sydney (cost: £870.14.5d) before being brought south by ship. It is essentially square, with verandas on three sides. The pyramidal roof is supported by a central post. Insulation was provided by felt placed between the inner and outer wood plank walls. This was found to be insufficient, and the hut was difficult to keep warm.

The Discovery hut was a large strong building, but was so draughty and cold in comparison with the ship, which was moored one hundred yards away, that it was, during the first year, never used for living quarters. Its sole use was as a storehouse, and a large supply of rough stores, such as flour, cocoa, coffee, biscuit, and tinned meat, was left there in the event of its being used as a place of retreat should any disaster overtake the ship. During the second year occasional parties camped inside the hut, but no bunks or permanent sleeping quarters were ever erected.

A cross was erected on the hill behind Discovery Hut in memory of George Vince who died in an accident during an expedition nearby in 1904. The cross has also been designated a Historic Site or Monument (HSM 19), following a proposal by New Zealand and the United Kingdom to the Antarctic Treaty Consultative Meeting.

When the Discovery finally left McMurdo Sound, the hut was stripped of all gear, including the stove, but there was left behind a large depot of the stores mentioned above.

=== British Antarctic Expedition 1907–09 ===
When Shackleton returned to McMurdo Sound in February 1908 he discovered that the door had been burst open, evidently by a southerly blizzard, and was jammed by snow outside and in. Entrance was made therefore through one of the lee windows. He used the hut in September and October 1908, as a storehouse for the large amount of equipment, food, and oil that they were to take while attempting to reach the pole. They built a sort of living-room out of the cases of provisions, and swept out the debris. The polar party elected to sleep there before the start, but the supporting party slept outside in the tents, as they considered it warmer. They continued to use the lee window as means of ingress and egress to avoid continual shovelling away of the snow, which would be necessary as every southerly blizzard blocked up the main entrance. The various depot parties made use of the hut for replenishing their stores, which had been sledged from Shackleton's Cape Royds hut to Hut Point.

After reaching within 100 nautical miles (190 km) of the pole they barely made it back alive. On the night of 3 March 1909, the southern party arrived having been absent on the march 128 days. One man needed medical attention urgently and so Shackleton tried to burn the nearby Magnetic Hut in the hope of attracting attention from the ship, but was not able to get it to light. He finally managed to light a flare of carbide, and the ship came down to them in a blizzard, and all were safely aboard at 1 a.m. on 4 March 1909. Before leaving the hut they jammed the window up with baulks of timber, to the best of their ability, in the storm and darkness.

=== British Antarctic Expedition 1910-1913 ===
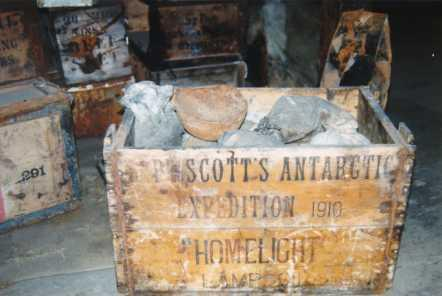
Stores from the Terra Nova Expedition left in Discovery Hut

When members of the Terra Nova Expedition journeyed south from Scott's Hut at Cape Evans in 1911 they found Discovery Hut full of snow and ice, along with supplies left over from 1903. Discovery Hut was cleaned out and used during 1911 and 1912 as a staging and rendezvous point for Terra Nova expeditioners heading south towards the Pole from Scott's Hut at Cape Evans.

Scott wrote of the hut:

March 8, 1911 The temperature of the hut is low, of course, but in every other respect we are absolutely comfortable. There is an unlimited quantity of biscuit, and our discovery at Pram Point means an unlimited supply of seal meat. We have heaps of cocoa, coffee, and tea, and a sufficiency of sugar and salt. In addition a small store of luxuries, chocolate, raisins, lentils, oatmeal, sardines, and jams, which will serve to vary the fare. An empty kerosene tin and some firebricks have been made into an excellent little stove, which has been connected to the old stove-pipe. The soldier fare of our meals is either stewed or fried on this stove whilst the tea or cocoa is being prepared on a primus. One way and another we shall manage to be very comfortable during our stay here, and already we can regard it as a temporary home.

March 9, 1911 Yesterday and to-day very busy about the hut and overcoming difficulties fast. The stove threatened to exhaust our store of firewood. We have redesigned it so that it takes only a few chips of wood to light it and then continues to give great heat with blubber alone. To-day there are to be further improvements to regulate the draught and increase the cooking range. We have further housed in the living quarters with our old Discovery winter awning, and begin already to retain the heat which is generated inside.

=== Imperial Trans-Antarctic Expedition 1914-1917 ===
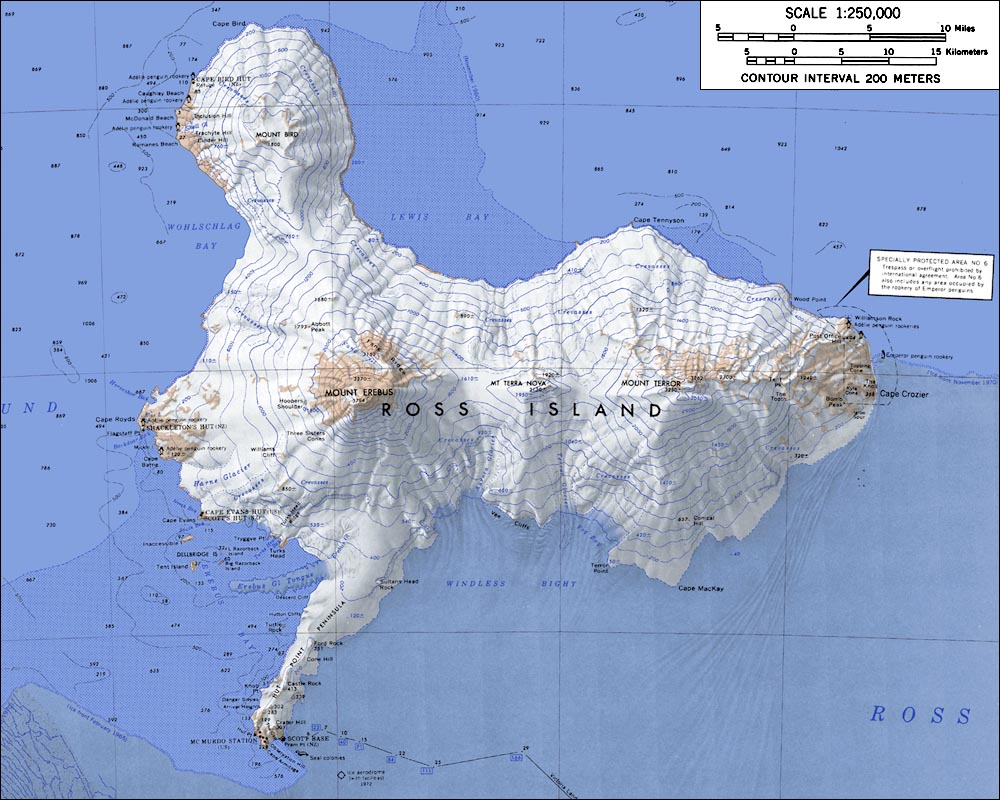
Map of Ross Island showing locations of Hut Point, Cape Royds and Cape Evans

The hut was used again by the Ross Sea party of the Imperial Trans-Antarctic Expedition. The snow was cleared out and extra stores were placed in it. Depot-laying to 80° in January–March 1915 was beset by problems. All ten dogs taken on the journey perished during the return. By the time that all parties were reunited at Hut Point on 25 March 1915 the men themselves were exhausted and frostbitten, and there was a significant loss of confidence in Aeneas Mackintosh, the leader. The condition of the sea ice in McMurdo Sound made the journey back to Cape Evans impossible, so the party was stranded until 1 June 1915 in spartan conditions and relying on seals for fresh meat and blubber fuel.

Several men were again stranded at Hut Point after the second depot-laying season. This began in September 1915 and by March 1916 Mackintosh, Spencer-Smith and Hayward had collapsed and were unable to walk. The three other men still on their feet, Richards, Joyce and Wild, were by now too weak to haul three invalids, so on 8 March 1916 Mackintosh volunteered to stay in the tent while the others attempted to take Spencer-Smith and Hayward to Hut Point. A day later Spencer-Smith died, utterly worn out by exhaustion and scurvy, and was buried in the ice. Joyce and Wild reached Hut Point with Hayward on 11 March and went back for Mackintosh. By 16 March the whole surviving party had reached the hut. The five survivors slowly recovered their strength with a diet of seal meat. The ice was too thin for them to risk the final trip to Cape Evans but the monotony of their diet and surroundings became wearisome. On 8 May Mackintosh and Hayward risked the ice and walked to Cape Evans. They were never seen again. Richards, Joyce and Wild waited until 15 July to make the trip to Cape Evans. The seal blubber used for heating during this expedition resulted in considerable staining of the interior walls and contents.

=== Preservation and decay ===
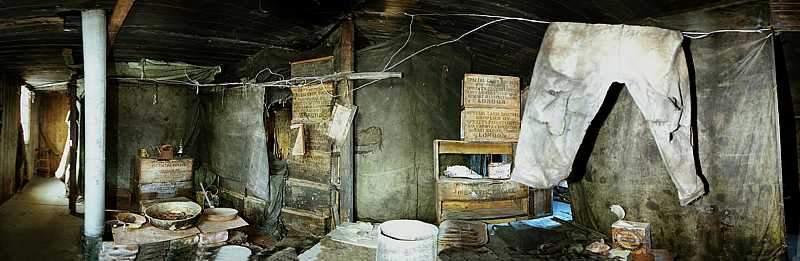
The interior of Discovery Hut in 2000

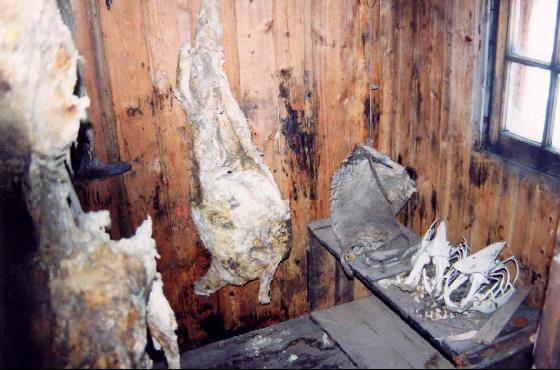
Sheep carcasses, nearly a century old, still hang neatly in Discovery Hut preserved by the temperature which never rises above freezing.

Shackleton advised future Antarctic explorers on the state of the hut after the Ross Sea party left it:

The stores placed there in 1902 are intact. There are a few cases of extra provisions and oil in the hut, but no sleeping gear, or accommodation, nor stoves, and it must not be looked upon as anything else than a shelter and a most useful pied-à-terre for the start of any Southern journey. No stores nor any equipment have been taken from it during either of my two Expeditions.

However, after Shackleton left the hut in 1917 it remained untouched until 1956 when US expeditioners dug it out of the snow and ice. It was found to be in a remarkable state of preservation, and included many artifacts from both the earlier expeditions. While some artifacts were taken as souvenirs at the time (and since), the hut remained largely as it was in 1917.

New Zealand and the UK have undertaken responsibility at various times since the 1970s to restore (largely removing snow and ice) both Scott's hut and Discovery Hut.

While the preservation of food in the freezing temperatures and dry climate has been noted, bacterial decay still occurs. Visitors describe the seal meat preserved at the Discovery Hut as smelling "quite rancid", and there are concerns that the fabric of these huts are being affected by fungal decay. Both Scott's Hut and Shackleton's Hut have been included on the World Monuments Watch List of 100 Most Endangered Sites.

== See also ==
- List of organizations based in Antarctica
- List of Antarctic field camps
