= John Hamilton (artist) =

- John Hamilton
- Born: 1919; England, United Kingdom
- Died: 1993 (aged 73–74)
- Education: Bradfield College

John Hamilton MC (1919–1993) was a British army officer and artist.

== Early life and military career ==
John Hamilton was born in England in 1919 and was educated at Bradfield College. Throughout World War II, he served in the British Army in India as a member of the Queen's Royal Regiment. As a junior officer at the age of 24, he received the Military Cross for gallantry during active operations against the enemy. Following his army service, he began a business career and settled in 1961 on the island of Tresco in the Isles of Scilly, Cornwall, where he sketched and painted for relaxation. In 1972, after a bout with angina, he sold his business and began painting on a full-time basis.

== Career as an artist ==
He began by selling his work to tourists, who visited the Isles of Scilly in the English Channel, specializing at first in painting the local topography, seascapes, traditional ships, and boats. Increasingly interested in the naval battles of World War II, in 1972 he began to paint a series of historical paintings on the War in the Atlantic, undertaking extensive archival research in London, Washington, and Stuttgart, and interviewing survivors. After seven years of work, he completed this 84-painting series at the end of 1978. Through the generosity of several shipping companies and the HMS Belfast Trust, his series of paintings is now in the collection of the Imperial War Museum, London, on board the museum ship HMS Belfast. On the completion of the Atlantic series, Hamilton started work on a new series of paintings on the War in the Pacific, widening his archival researches and interviewing to Canberra and Tokyo with extensive research work at the Naval Historical Center in Washington, D.C., With the help of foundations in Texas, Hamilton completed more than 120 paintings in five years. This collection is now part of the U.S. Navy Art Collection. 176 of the total 204 paintings in the two series were published in Hamilton's book War at Sea, 1939–1945.

After completing his work on World War II, Hamilton turned to the more recent Falklands War and a study of the uses of the helicopter during that conflict. This project required three visits to the Falkland Islands and four years to produce 46 paintings. In his 70s, he developed an interest in the Antarctic and spent two winters there on board HMS Endurance (A171), painting the scenery and doing historical paintings of Sir Ernest Shackleton's expedition using the evidence of surviving buildings, in addition to research, to recreate historical scenes. In this work, he became a key figure in inspiring the organisation of the UK Antarctic Heritage Trust.

== Published works ==
- Country capers: short stories and verses (1979)
- War at sea, 1939–1945 (1986)
- Sketching with a pencil: for those who are just beginning (1989)
- The Helicopter Story of The Falklands Campaign (1991)
- Sketching at home: for those who are just beginning (1991)
- The complete sketching book (1996)
