= Shackleton's Hut =

Hut in Antarctica

- Antarctic camp
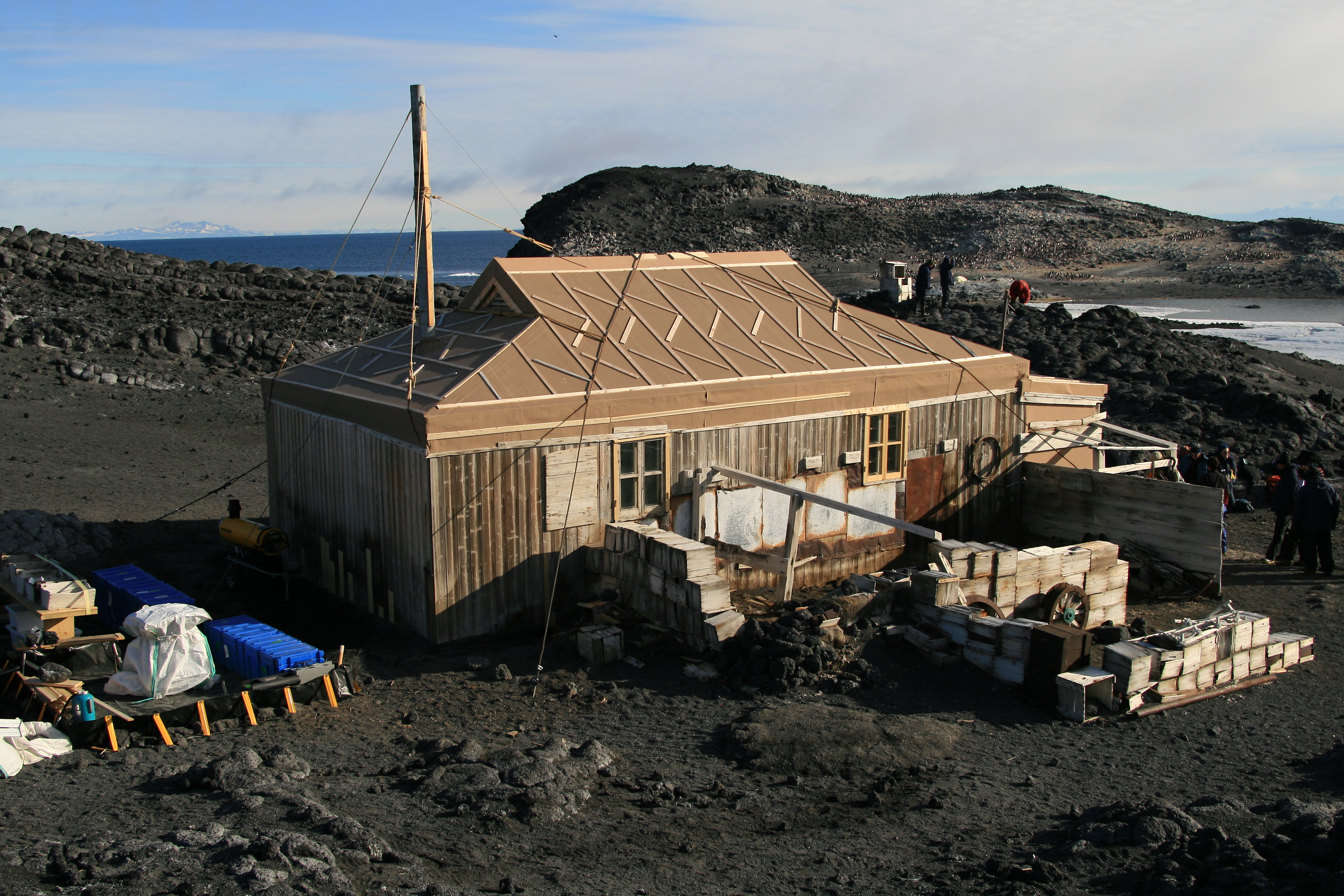
- Shackleton's Hut at Cape Royds

- Location of Shackleton's Hut in Antarctica
- Coordinates: 77°33′11″S 166°10′06″E
- Country: United Kingdom
- Location in Antarctica: Ross Island; McMurdo Sound; Antarctica
- Administered by: Nimrod Expedition
- Established: 1907
- Type: All-year round
- Period: Annual
- Status: Restored and preserved

Shackleton's Hut (77.552929°S 166.168286°E) is a historical site near Cape Royds, Ross Island, Antarctica, where the explorer Ernest Shackleton built a hut that housed his party during the winter of 1908.

== Foundation ==
A group of explorers from Shackleton's Nimrod expedition, 1907–1909, in the Antarctic hut at Cape Royds

When Shackleton went into McMurdo Sound in 1908, having failed to land on King Edward VII Land, he decided to build a hut at Cape Royds, a small promontory twenty-three miles north of Hut Point where Scott had stayed during the Discovery Expedition. The whole shore party lived in this hut through the winter of 1908. When spring arrived, stores were sledged to Hut Point, so that should the sea-ice break up early between these two places, they might not be left in an awkward position. Shackleton did not return to the hut after his furthest south attempt, however he had left full instructions with Professor Edgeworth David as to the care of the hut, and before the whole Expedition left, the hut was put in order. A letter was pinned in a conspicuous place inside, stating that there were sufficient provisions and equipment to last fifteen men for one year, indicating also the details of these provisions and the position of the coal store. The stove was in good condition, and the letter ended with an invitation for any succeeding party to make what use they required of stores and hut. The hut was then locked and the key nailed on the door in a conspicuous place.

== Later events ==
Scott could have used this as a base during the Terra Nova Expedition, given that it was unlikely to suffer the sea ice problem which afflicted Hut Point. However, he had reached an agreement with Shackleton that neither would use each other's facilities. One of the few visits to Shackleton's hut made during Scott's 1910–1913 expedition was by a prior member of Shackleton's expedition. Shackleton's hut was found intact, with bread still on the tables just as it had been left. Raymond Priestley, who had walked out the door of the building two years previously, described coming back to the place as 'very eerie'. Priestley retrieved a tin of butter, tins of jam, a plum pudding and gingerbread biscuits from the site, all of which were described as being perfectly fresh.

Amongst other things, five crates of McKinlay and Co. whisky were found buried under the hut in 2006. One crate is currently in Canterbury Museum in Christchurch, New Zealand undergoing restoration and, if possible, analysis of the whisky.

== Historic site ==
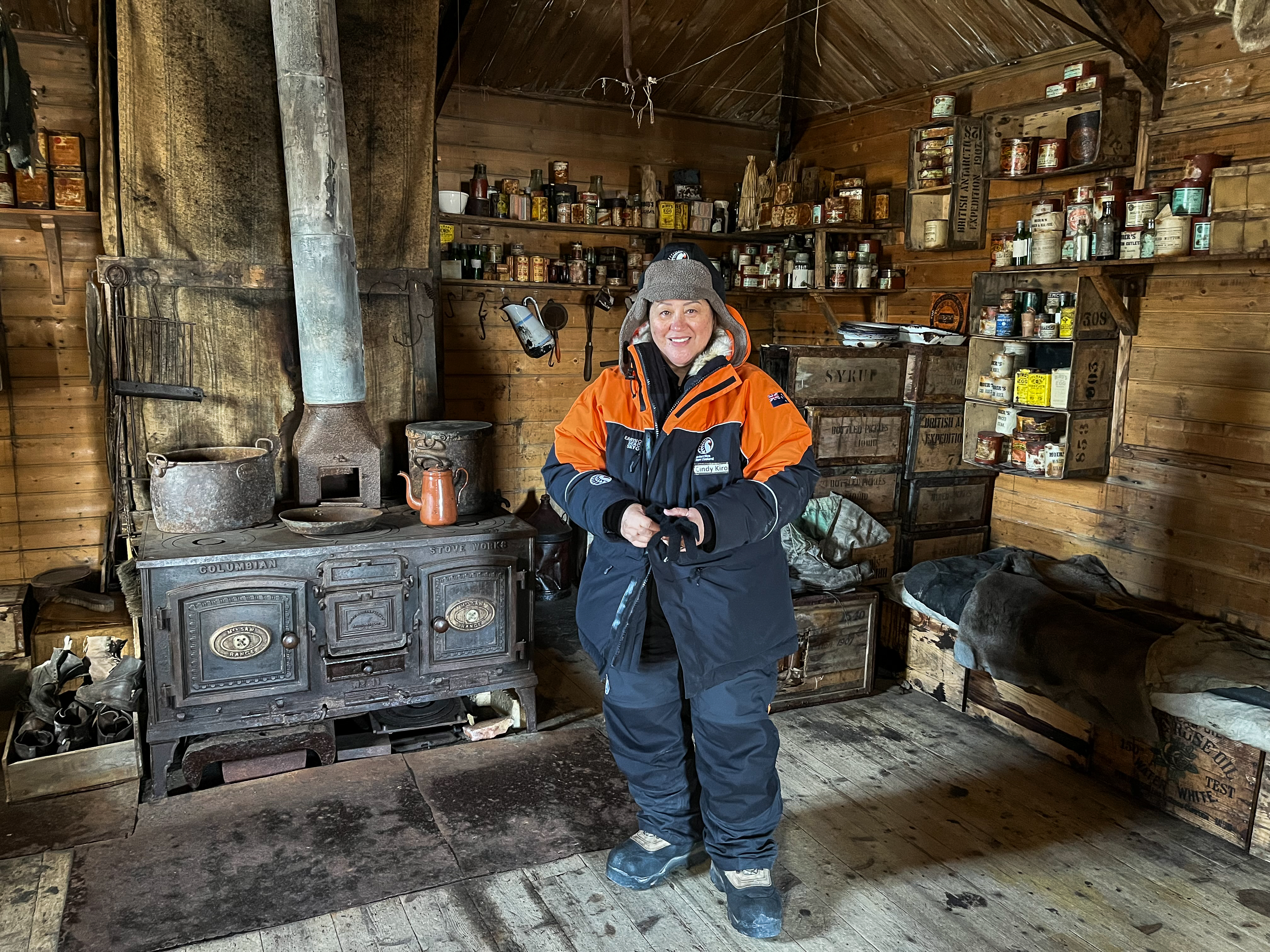
The governor-general of New Zealand, Cindy Kiro, inside Shackleton's Hut on 15 November 2025

The Antarctic Heritage Trust (New Zealand) has custody over the site. Nominated by AHT, Shackleton's Hut was listed in the 2004, 2006, and 2008 World Monuments Watch by the World Monuments Fund to attract attention and financial support for the site. In 2004, through WMF, funding for conservation was provided by American Express, and by 2008, the structure was fully restored to its condition when Shackleton's team left it. Shackleton's Hut has been designated a Historic Site or Monument (HSM 15), following a proposal by New Zealand and the United Kingdom to the Antarctic Treaty Consultative Meeting.

== See also ==
- Antarctic field camps
