= Tasmanian polar network =

The Tasmanian Polar Network (TPN) is an industry body based in Hobart, an Antarctic gateway city in the state of Tasmania, Australia. It comprises scientific institutions, businesses and organisations which have a focus on supporting commercial and scientific effort in Antarctica, the subantarctic and the Southern Ocean.

Through the network, members provide goods services for Antarctic, subantarctic and Southern Ocean expeditions and encourage collaboration between science research institutions. The body also acts as a lobby group for the Antarctic sector in the state.

== History ==
The TPN was formed in July 1993 by the Tasmanian Government to encourage collaboration between industry, research institutions and government in the Tasmanian Antarctic sector. It was incorporated in 1999, with its operation becoming the responsibility of elected committee members.

== Membership and structure ==
The Tasmanian Polar Network has more than 70 members across over 25 sectors, including a governing committee of a chairman, senior deputy chairman, deputy chairman, treasurer, secretary, public officer and three executive committee members, is elected annually by members. Antarctic Tasmania in Hobart is the permanent Secretariat of the TPN.

== Funding ==
The network is an independent body that charges annual membership fees and receives an annual grant from the Tasmanian Government.
