= Redford Pennycook =

English rugby union player

- Born: 27 November 1985 (age 40)
- Height: 1.93 m (6 ft 4 in)
- Weight: 105 kg (16 st 7 lb)

Rugby union career
- Position: Flanker
Senior career
Years	Team	Apps	(Points)
2005–2010	Bristol	158	
2010–	Newcastle Falcons		

Redford Pennycook (born 27 November 1985) is a rugby union player for Bristol in the RFU Championship. A flanker, Pennycook played for Bristol for five seasons before joining Newcastle Falcons in summer 2010. He returned to Bristol in February 2012. His brother is former Bristol Rugby player Chevvy Pennycook.
