= Jean Pennycook =

American educator and penguin researcher

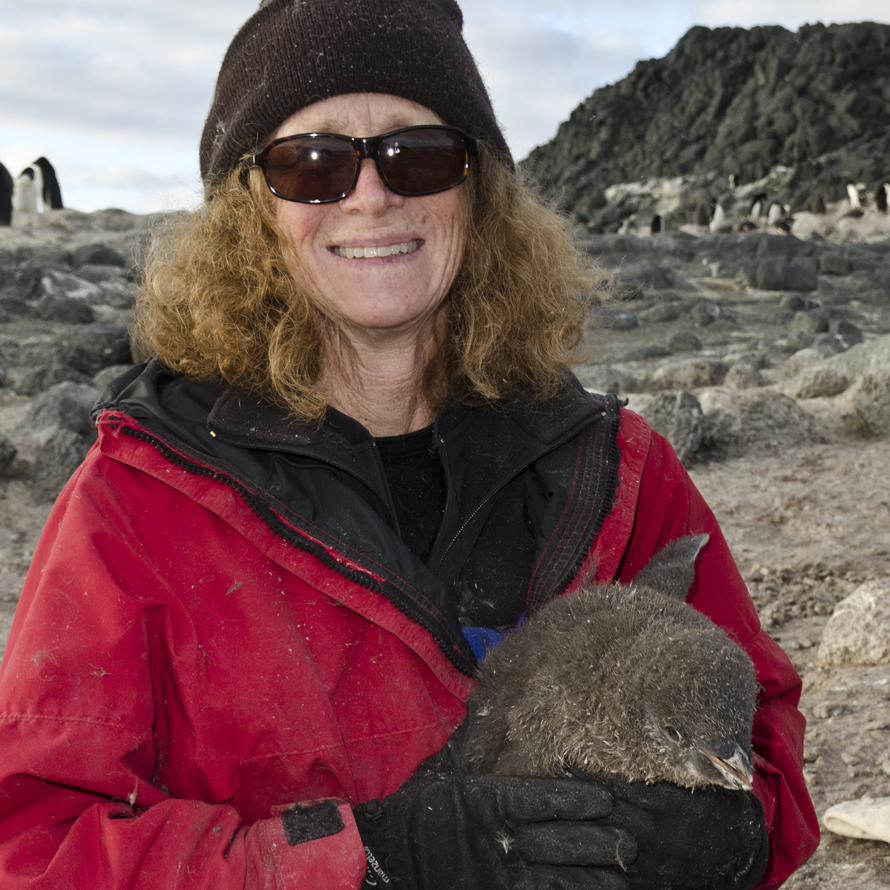
Jean Pennycook holding an Adélie penguin chick

Jean Pennycook is an American educator and zoologist specializing in Antarctic Adélie penguins. She is based in Cape Royds, an Antarctic Specially Protected Area which hosts a stable population of Adélie penguins.

== Career ==
Pennycook first came to Antarctica in 1999 as part of a team from the New Mexico Institute of Mining and Technology, who were researching Mount Erebus, a volcano on Ross Island. She publicized scientific research in Antarctica using several science outreach methods, including online journal entries and postcards, video conferences with schoolchildren, and a documentary about the effect of climate change on penguins. Pennycook and her fellow researcher David Ainley run an educational website, Penguin Science, which summarizes the research team's work and aims to attract future scientists to the field. Pennycook has supervised interns in the Polar Internship Program, which aims to enable students of underrepresented racial or social groups to visit Antarctica and become familiarized with Antarctic scientific research.

Pennycook created an outreach project where schoolchildren could send personalized postcards with drawings of penguins sent to her, which would then be returned with an Antarctic postmark. Schools also have the option of designing a class flag to be flown in Antarctica, which can subsequently be viewed through a live penguin webcam on the research team's website.

== Publications ==
- Pennycook, Jean (October 2006). "Penguins Marching Into Your Classroom". Science and Children. 44 (2): 65.
- Kim, S.; Pennycook, J.; Eastman, J. (2011). "Short Note: Antarctic toothfish heads found along tide cracks of the McMurdo Ice Shelf". Antarctic Science. 23 (5): 469–470. Bibcode:2011AntSc..23..469K. doi:10.1017/S095410201100040X.
- Ainley, D.G.; Lindke, K.; Ballard, G.; et al. (2017). "Spatio-temporal occurrence patterns of cetaceans near Ross Island, Antarctica, 2002–2015: implications for food web dynamics". Polar Biol. 40 (9): 1761–1775. Bibcode:2017PoBio..40.1761A. doi:10.1007/s00300-017-2100-9.
- Morandini, V.; Dugger, K.M.; Ballard, G.; Elrod, M.; Schmidt, A.; Ruoppolo, V.; Lescroël, A.; Jongsomjit, D.; Massaro, M.; Pennycook, J.; et al. (2019). "Identification of a Novel Adélie Penguin Circovirus at Cape Crozier (Ross Island, Antarctica)". Viruses. 11 (12): 1088. Bibcode:2019Virus..11.1088M. doi:10.3390/v11121088. PMC 6950389. PMID 31766719.
- LaRue, MA; Salas, L; Nur, N; Ainley, DG; et al. (2019). "Physical and ecological factors explain the distribution of Ross Sea Weddell seals during the breeding season". Mar Ecol Prog Ser. 612: 193–208. Bibcode:2019MEPS..612..193L. doi:10.3354/meps12877.
- LaRue, M.A.; Ainley, D.G.; Pennycook, J.; Stamatiou, K.; Salas, L.; Nur, N.; Stammerjohn, S.; Barrington, L. (2020). "Engaging 'the crowd' in remote sensing to learn about habitat affinity of the Weddell seal in Antarctica". Remote Sens Ecol Conserv. 6 (1): 70–78. Bibcode:2020RSEC....6...70L. doi:10.1002/rse2.124.
- Salas, Leo A.; LaRue, Michelle; Nur, Nadav; Ainley, David G.; Stammerjohn, Sharon E.; Pennycook, Jean; Rotella, Jay; Paterson, John Terrill; Siniff, Don; Stamatiou, Kostas; Dozier, Melissa; Saints, Jon; Barrington, Luke (2020). "Reducing error and increasing reliability of wildlife counts from citizen science surveys: counting Weddell Seals in the Ross Sea from satellite images". bioRxiv 10.1101/2020.11.18.388157.
- LaRue, Michelle; et al. (2021). "Insights from the first global population estimate of Weddell seals in Antarctica". Sci. Adv. 7 (39) eabh3674. Bibcode:2021SciA....7.3674L. doi:10.1126/sciadv.abh3674. PMC 8462891. PMID 34559555.
