= Antarctica New Zealand Community Engagement Programme =

From the 2014/15 Antarctic season, The Artists to Antarctica programme (also known as the Antarctica New Zealand Arts Fellowship and the Invited Artists Programme Antarctic Arts Fellows) was replaced by The Antarctica New Zealand Community Engagement Programme. The aim of this new programme is to attract applicants with a genuine interest in Antarctica and the environment, who understand the importance of the science carried out in Antarctica and can express and communicate this in new and different ways to reach a wide audience of New Zealanders.

| Date | Recipient | Occupation/Organisation |
|---|---|---|
| 2014/15 | Danny Watson and Tim Dyer | Newstalk ZB |
| 2014/15 | Sam Hayes | TV3 |
| 2014/15 | Anthony Powell | A Year on Ice sequel |
| 2014/15 | John Law | MetService |
| 2014/15 | Hamish Clark | TV3 |
| 2014/15 | Martin Hill and Philippa Jones | Environmental artists |
| 2014/15 | Jason Edwards | National Geographic photographer |
| 2014/15 | Trey Ratcliff and Stu Robertson | Artist and Global Conversationalist |
| 2015/16 | Drew Painter, Ben Zupo, Rob Seaman and J J Kelley | National Geographic six part series |
| 2015/16 | Anthony Powell | Film-maker |
| 2015/16 | David Farrar | Kiwiblog |
| 2015/16 | Jamie Morton | NZ Herald |
| 2015/16 | Dan Corbett and Lisa Davies | TVNZ |
| 2015/16 | Sean Garwood | Artist |
| 2016/17 | Jason O'Hara and Warren Maxwell | Digital Media |
| 2016/17 | Pete Somerville | LEARNZ |
| 2016/17 | Jamie Curry and Damian Christie | YouTube |
| 2016/17 | Guy Frederick | Photo Journalist |
| 2016/17 | Philippa Werry | Writer |
| 2016/17 | TedXScott Base | TedX talks |
| 2016/17 | Lisa Davies | TVNZ |
| 2016/17 | Anthony Powell | 365 Days on Ice |
| 2017/18 | Corey Baker | Corey Baker Dance/ New Zealand Royal Ballet |
| 2017/18 | Rebecca Priestley | Victoria University of Wellington |
| 2017/18 | Stu and Semele Robertson | Peace in 10,000 Hands |
| 2017/18 | Neil Silverwood | Photographer/ New Zealand Geographic |
| 2017/18 | Sam Hayes, Breanna Barraclough | NewsHub |
| 2017/18 | Will Harvie and Ian McGregor | Stuff / The Press |
| 2018/19 | Vanessa Wells, Richard Lord, James Corbin | Elanti Media, New Zealand Playhouse |
| 2018/19 | Tasha Impey | Re: |
| 2018/19 | Jamie Morton | NZ Herald |
| 2018/19 | Thomas Mead, Robert Grieve | Newshub |
| 2018/19 | Poutama Hetaraka, James York, Vanessa Wells | NIWA/Manaaki Whenua |
