= Chevvy Pennycook =

English rugby union player

- Born: 6 April 1987 (age 39) Bristol, England
- Height: 1.85 m (6 ft 1 in)
- Weight: 130 kg (20 st 7 lb)
- School: St. Brendan's Sixth Form College
- Notable relative: Redford Pennycook

Rugby union career
- Position: Flanker
- Current team: London Scottish
Senior career
Years	Team	Apps	(Points)
2005-2009	Bristol	90	
2009-2013	Moseley		

Chevvy Pennycook (born 6 April 1987) is a rugby union player for Moseley in the Aviva Championship, who formerly played for Bristol in the Premiership. He played for England under18s-20s. He plays at flanker. His brother is Bristol player Redford Pennycook. Chevvy Pennycook was selected in the 2012-2013 Rugby Paper Dream team. He retired at 28 after a string of serious neck injuries.

Pennycook represented the England Under 20 side in 2007. He signed for Moseley at the end of the 2008–09 Guinness Premiership.
