= Cape Royds =

Landform on Ross Island, Antarctica

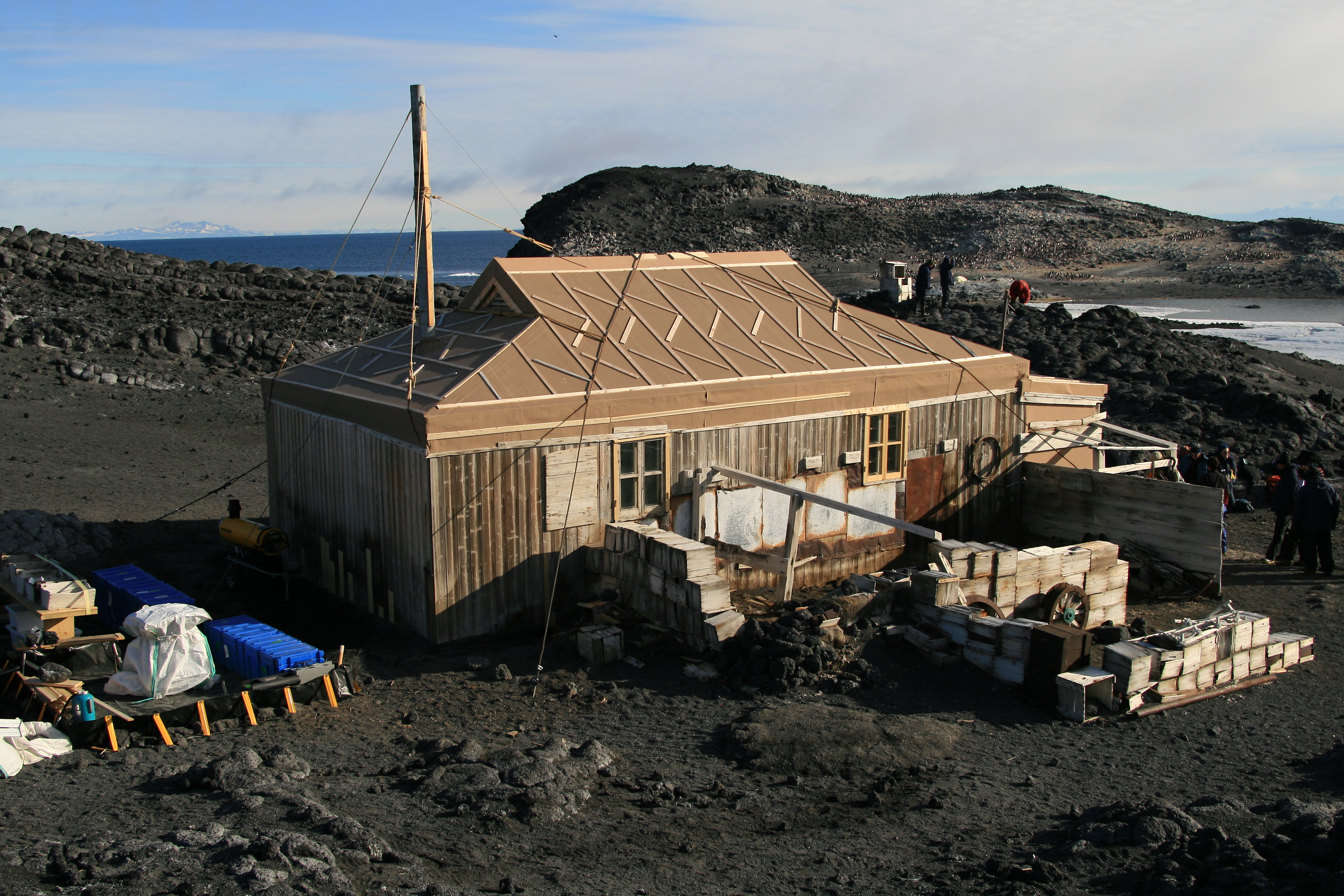
- Cape Royds' Shackleton's hut

- Location within Antarctica

Geography
- Location: Antarctica
- Coordinates: 77°33′S 166°09′E

Administration
- Antarctica
- Administered under the Antarctic Treaty System

Cape Royds (77°33′S 166°09′E) is a dark rock cape forming the western extremity of Ross Island, facing on McMurdo Sound, Antarctica. It was discovered by the British National Antarctic Expedition (BrNAE) (1901–1904) and named for Lieutenant Charles Royds, Royal Navy, who acted as meteorologist on the expedition. Royds subsequently rose to become an Admiral and was later Commissioner of the Metropolitan Police, London. The cape is the site of Shackleton's Hut, the expedition camp of the British Antarctic Expedition, 1907–09.

== Shackleton's Hut ==
A group of explorers from Shackleton's Nimrod Expedition, 1907–1909, in the Antarctic hut at Cape Royds

Shackleton's Hut (77.552929°S 166.168286°E) is a historical site near Cape Royds, Ross Island, Antarctica, where the explorer Ernest Shackleton built a hut that housed his party during the winter of 1908. When Shackleton went into McMurdo Sound in 1908, having failed to land on King Edward VII Land, he decided to build a hut at Cape Royds, a small promontory twenty-three miles north of Hut Point where Scott had stayed during the Discovery Expedition. The whole shore party lived in this hut through the winter of 1908.

The Antarctic Heritage Trust (New Zealand) has custody over the site. Nominated by AHT, Shackleton's Hut was listed in the 2004, 2006, and 2008 World Monuments Watch by the World Monuments Fund to attract attention and financial support for the site.

== Antarctic Specially Protected Area ==
An area of 6200 ha at the cape is protected as Antarctic Specially Protected Area (ASPA 121, incorporating HSM 15) because it supports the southernmost established Adélie penguin colony known, with a long period of population data. The presence of polynyas in McMurdo Sound provides an ice-free area where penguins can feed, and is important for the survival of the penguin colony. The area plays host to penguin researchers such as Jean Pennycook. The area is also important for its terrestrial and freshwater ecology; it is the type locality for several species of algae, including the southernmost record of snow algae.

== Lakes ==
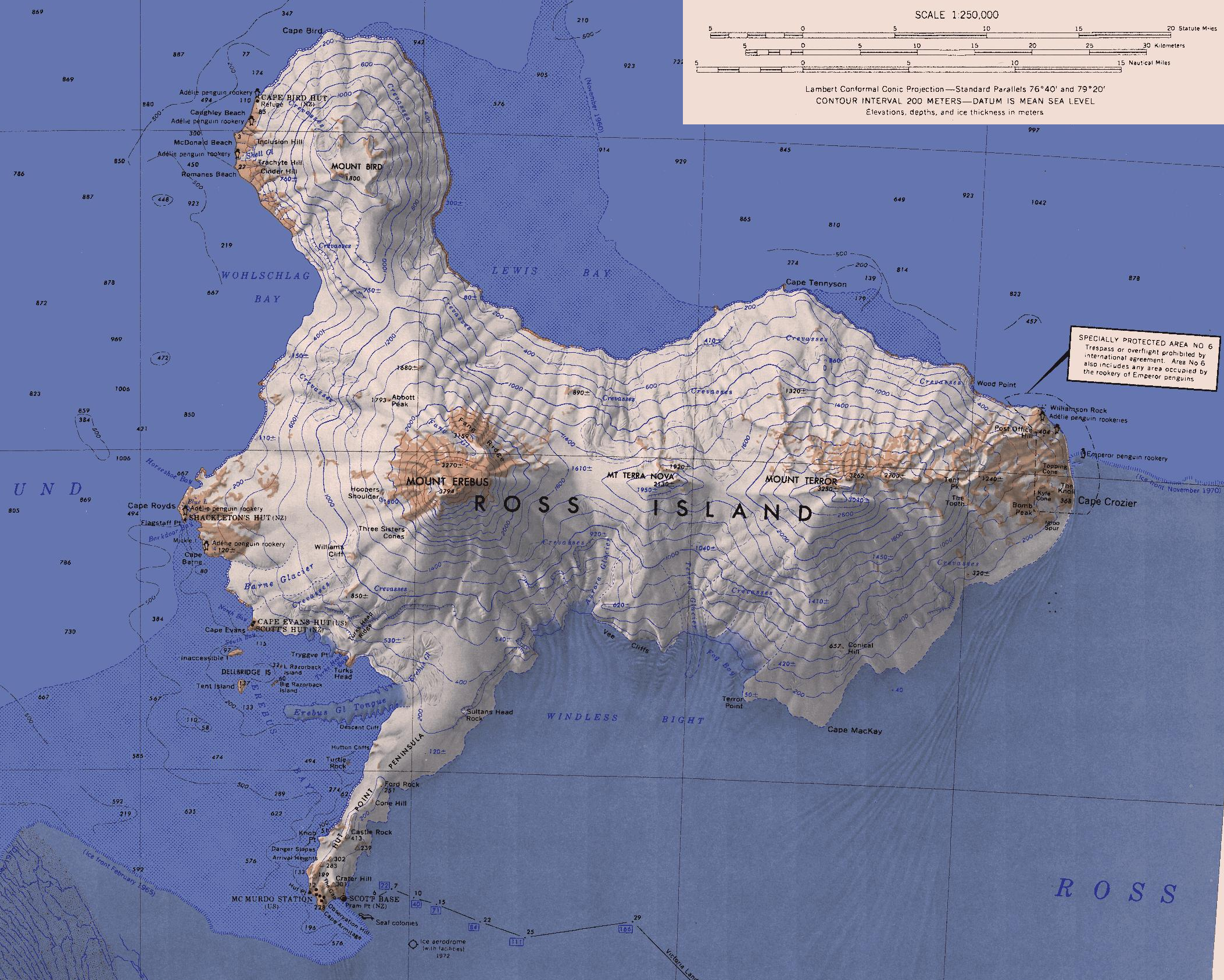
Cape Royds in west

There are a number of small lakes near the cape.

=== Blue Lake ===
77°32′S 166°10′E. The largest of several small frozen lakes near Cape Royds, lying 0.5 nautical miles (0.93 km; 0.58 mi) north-northeast of Flagstaff Point. Named by the British Antarctic Expedition, 1907–09 on account of the intensely vivid blue color of its ice.

=== Clear Lake ===
77°32′S 166°09′E. A small lake just west-northwest of Blue Lake at Cape Royds. A descriptive name given by the British Antarctic Expedition (1907-09). It is the deepest lake in this vicinity.

=== Green Lake ===
77°33′S 166°09′E. A small lake near the coast, about midway between Pony Lake and Coast Lake at Cape Royds. Named by British Antarctic Expedition, 1907-09, because of its coloring.

=== Coast Lake ===
77°32′S 166°08′E. A small lake at Cape Royds, lying close to the coast, about 0.75 nautical miles (1.39 km; 0.86 mi) north of Flagstaff Point. Named by the British Antarctic Expedition, 1907-09, because of its position.

=== Pony Lake ===
77°33′S 166°09′E. A small lake immediately north of Flagstaff Point at Cape Royds. Named by British Antarctic Expedition, 1907-09, who built their winter hut adjacent to this lake, because they had their ponies tethered nearby.

=== Deep Lake ===
77°34′S 166°13′E. A small elongate lake 0.5 nautical miles (0.93 km; 0.58 mi) north of Cape Barne. The descriptive name was applied by the British Antarctic Expedition, 1907-09.

=== Sunk Lake ===
77°34′S 166°13′E. A small lake lying between Deep Lake and the coast at Cape Royds. The descriptive name appears on the maps by the British Antarctic Expedition, 1910–13, but it may have been given earlier by the British Antarctic Expedition (1907-09). The surface of the ice comprising the lake is 18 ft below sea level.

=== Terrace Lake ===
77.577515°S 166.281582°E. A descriptive name for a small, elongate lake which lies in a valley with moraine from the Barne Glacier, about 0.5 miles (0.80 km) east of Cape Barne. The name appears on the maps of the British Antarctic Expedition (BrAE) (1910-13), but may have been applied earlier by the British Antarctic Expedition (BrAE) (1907-09).

== Northern features ==
Features around Cape Royds include Horseshoe Bay, Shackleton's Hut, Blacksand Beach, Flagstaff Point, Backdoor Bay, Mickle Island and Cape Barne.

Features to the north of Cape Royds include, from north to south,

=== Varcoe Headland ===
77.52°S 166.2116667°E. A low headland, 34 metres (112 ft) high, that marks the north entrance point to Horseshoe Bay in west Ross Island. Named by New Zealand Geographic Board (NZGB) after Technical Services Officer Garth Edwin Varcoe, who worked in the NZ Antarctic Program over a period of 15 years until his accidental death in a helicopter crash near this headland in October 1992. His expertise was in the mechanical and electrical areas and he played a leading role in the reconstruction of Scott Base.

=== Newport Point ===
77.5261111°S 166.1880556°E. The south entrance point to Horseshoe Bay in west Ross Island. Named by New Zealand Geographic Board (NZGB) after Terry Newport, a carpenter in the NZ Antarctic Program, who perished in a helicopter crash near this point in October 1992.

=== Horseshoe Bay ===
77°32′S 166°12′E. A cove just north of Cape Royds. Discovered and named by the British National Antarctic Expedition (1901-04) under Robert Falcon Scott. The name suggests the shape of the cove.

=== Blacksand Beach ===
77°33′S 166°08′E. A beach formed of black volcanic sand, about 0.5 nautical miles (0.93 km; 0.58 mi) northward of Flagstaff Point. The descriptive name was given by members of the British Antarctic Expedition, 1907-09, who found the beach within safe walking distance of their base hut near Flagstaff Point.

=== Turret Cone ===
77.55096°S 166.440671°E. A small summit about 455 metres (1,493 ft) high, that is locally conspicuous, located 3.8 nautical miles (7.0 km; 4.4 mi) east of Cape Royds and 3 nautical miles (5.6 km; 3.5 mi) northeast of Cape Barne on Ross Island. Descriptively named by Griffith Taylor of the British Antarctic Expedition (British Antarctic Expedition), 1910-13.

== Southern features ==
Features to the south of Cape Royds include, from north to south,

=== Flagstaff Point ===
77°33′S 166°11′E. A point forming the south end of the Cape Royds headland. Charted and named by the British Antarctic Expedition under Shackleton, 1907-09, which established its winter headquarters and erected a flag near the point.

=== Backdoor Bay ===
77°34′S 166°12′E. A small bay lying at the east side of Cape Royds. The British Antarctic Expedition, 1907-09, under Shackleton, unloaded supplies at Backdoor Bay for use at their winter headquarters on Cape Royds. So named by them because it lies at the back (east) side of Cape Royds, opposite the small cove on the west side of the cape, known to them as "Front Door Bay."

=== Mickle Island ===
77°34′S 166°13′E. A very small island 1 nautical mile (1.9 km; 1.2 mi) southeast of Flagstaff Point. Charted and so named by the British Antarctic Expedition led by Shackleton, 1907-09. The name appears to be capricious or whimsical, mickle meaning "great."

=== Mount Cis ===
77.568014°S 166.289902°E. A hill, 184 metres (604 ft) high, located 1.1 nautical miles (2.0 km; 1.3 mi) northeast of Cape Barne in west Ross Island. Named by the British Antarctic Expedition (British Antarctic Expedition), 1907-09, at the suggestion of geologist Raymond Priestley, after one of the expeditionary dogs.

=== Cape Barne ===
77°35′S 166°14′E. A steep, rocky bluff rising to 120 metres (390 ft) high between Cape Royds and Cape Evans. Discovered by the British National Antarctic Expedition, 1901-04, under Scott, and named by him for Lieutenant Michael Barne, Royal Navy, a member of the expedition.

== Sources ==
- Alberts, Fred G., ed. (1995), Geographic Names of the Antarctic (PDF) (2 ed.), United States Board on Geographic Names This article incorporates public domain material from websites or documents of the United States Board on Geographic Names.
- "Cape Royds, Ross Island" (PDF), Management Plan for Antarctic Specially Protected Area No. 121: Measure 5, Annex, Antarctic Treaty Secretariat, 2009
- "Mount Cis", Geographic Names Information System, United States Geological Survey, United States Department of the Interior
- "Newport Point", Geographic Names Information System, United States Geological Survey, United States Department of the Interior
- Ross Island, USGS: United States Geological Survey
- Shackleton, Ernest Henry, Sir (1920), South : the story of Shackleton's last expedition, 1914-1917, New York: Macmillan
- "Turret Cone", Geographic Names Information System, United States Geological Survey, United States Department of the Interior
- World Monuments Fund – Scott's Hut and the Explorers' Heritage of Antarctica, archived from the original on 2010-12-04
- Shah, Dhruti (3 December 2016), Sending a postcard from somewhere you've never been, BBC, archived from the original on 10 June 2021
- "Terrace Lake", Geographic Names Information System, United States Geological Survey, United States Department of the Interior
- "Varcoe Headland", Geographic Names Information System, United States Geological Survey, United States Department of the Interior

This article incorporates public domain material from websites or documents of the United States Geological Survey.
