= Antarctica New Zealand =

Institute that manages New Zealand's interests in Antarctica and the Ross Sea

Agency overview
- Formed: 1 June 1966
- Jurisdiction: Government of New Zealand
- Website: http://antarcticanz.govt.nz

A map of the Ross Dependency, the part of Antarctica claimed by New Zealand.

Antarctica New Zealand is an agency set up by the Government of New Zealand to manage its interests in Antarctica and the Ross Sea. As well as providing logistics support to a large scientific programme, it also runs bases such as Scott Base. It has run other bases in the past, such as Vanda Station.

New Zealand's involvement in Antarctica began in 1923, when activities were closely connected with the United Kingdom. Close cooperation with other nations has been an important part of New Zealand's involvement in Antarctica.

Since 1959, Scott Base has been New Zealand's permanent base in Antarctica. From 1965 to 1988, the person responsible for much of Scott Base development as head of the Antarctic Division of the DSIR was Bob Thomson.

A 1994 review recognised Antarctica as strategically important to New Zealand as a Southern Hemisphere nation. This resulted in the establishment of the New Zealand Antarctic Institute, known as Antarctica New Zealand, on 1 July 1996.

The institute reports to the Ministry Of Foreign Affairs and Trade (MFAT) Antarctic Policy Unit. It is a Crown entity, and has a CEO and a board. Members of the board are appointed for three years by the minister of foreign affairs and trade in consultation with the board chair. This period may be extended by the minister for up to a further three years.

Members are collectively accountable to the Minister of Foreign Affairs and Trade for the performance of Antarctica New Zealand. All delegated functions and powers within Antarctica New Zealand arise from the Board's delegations.

The board's role is governance. Specific functions within this overall role include setting the strategic direction of Antarctica New Zealand and developing policy in a manner consistent with the organisation's statutory framework, for example through the Annual Business Plan, ensuring compliance with the law, accountability documents and relevant Crown expectations. This includes financial responsibility for all money received by the Crown and reinforcing expectations of behaviour that are appropriate to a public body, appointing the Chief Executive, monitoring the performance of Antarctica New Zealand and the chief executive, and maintaining appropriate relationships with the Minister, Parliament and the public. This includes accounting for the performance and management of the organisation.

The chief executive is responsible for the staffing and management of Antarctica New Zealand.

In August 2018 Peter Beggs the chief executive from 2014 was asked to resign immediately by the board.

== Employment ==
Antarctica New Zealand employs many scientists, and people from other professions. In 2025, a vacancy arose of 40 people to work in Antarctica. The jobs most in demand are engineers and mechanics. There are around 130 people working at Scott Base.

== Scott Base redevelopment ==
An NZ$150 million upgrade for Scott Base is currently being planned. In June 2019 the Government committed NZ$18.5 million (US$12.4 million) for the next phase of the Scott Base Redevelopment project. Jasmax and Hugh Broughton Architects came up with the architectural design. In 2024, Antarctica New Zealand announced it would be reducing the proposed development of Scott Base as a way of reducing costs. The redevelopment was originally projected to cost $250 million, but as of 2024 had increased to $498 million. Antarctica New Zealand announced that the redevelopment would include building new accommodation and living areas, refurbishing the Hillary Field Centre, to scope a third building for workshops, plant and machinery, and to extend the life of current buildings.

== See also ==
- List of organizations based in Antarctica
- New Zealand Antarctic Research Programme
- Ross Dependency
- Timeline of New Zealand's links with Antarctica
