= Potter =

A potter is someone who makes pottery.

Potter may also refer to:

== Places ==
=== United States ===
- Potter, originally a section on the Alaska Railroad, currently a neighborhood of Anchorage, Alaska, US
- Potter, Arkansas
- Potter, Nebraska
- Potters, New Jersey
- Potter, New York
- Potter, Wisconsin
- Potter County, Pennsylvania
- Potter County, South Dakota
- Potter County, Texas
- Potter Lake, Wisconsin
- Potter Township (disambiguation)
- Potter Valley, California
  - Potter Valley AVA, California wine region in Mendocino County
- Potter Cemetery, Michigan

=== Elsewhere ===
- 7320 Potter, an asteroid
- Potter Island, Nunavut, Canada
- Potter Peninsula, South Shetland Islands

== People and fictional characters ==
- Potter (name), a given name and a surname, including a list of people and fictional characters with the name

== Arts, entertainment, and media ==
- Potter (TV series), a TV sitcom starring Arthur Lowe
- Harry and the Potters, an American rock band
- Harry Potter, worldwide bestselling book and film series
- Miss Potter, a 2006 film by Chris Noonan
- The Potters (artists group), a women's artistic and literary group in St. Louis, Missouri
- The Potters (film), a lost 1927 silent film

== Sports ==
- Stoke City F.C or The Potters, an English football club
- Stoke Potters, an English speedway team
- The Potters, the sports teams of East Liverpool High School, Ohio

== Vessels ==
- T. J. Potter, a steamboat
- USS Stephen Potter (DD-538), a naval destroyer

== Other uses ==
- "Potter", the codename of Motorola's Moto G5 Plus smartphone
- Potter Box, a model for making ethical decisions
- Potter's field, a place for the burial of unknown people
- Potter Instrument, a defunct American computer company
- Potter sequence, a birth defect
