= New College =

New College is the name or nickname of many academic institutions, including:

== Antarctica ==
- New College Valley, Ross Island

== Australia ==
- New College, University of New South Wales, Sydney

== Canada ==
- New College, University of Toronto, Toronto

== India ==
- The New College, Chennai, South India

== United Kingdom ==
- North East Worcestershire College Redditch and Bromsgrove
- New College, Durham (17th century)
- New College Durham (Current FE and HE college)
- New College, Edinburgh
- New College Leicester
- New College London, St John's Wood
- Former New College Nottingham
- New College, Oxford, University of Oxford (1379)
- New College School, Oxford
- New College, Pontefract
- University of Southampton New College, 1997–2006
- New College, St Andrews
- New College, Swindon
- New College, Telford, Wellington
- New College Worcester
- New College of the Humanities, Bloomsbury, London

== United States ==
- New College at Frisco, University of North Texas
- New College Berkeley, California
- New College of Florida, Sarasota
- Former New College of California, San Francisco Bay Area
- New College, University of Alabama, Tuscaloosa
- New College of Interdisciplinary Arts and Sciences, Arizona State University, Phoenix
- Harvard College, referred to as "the New College" until named in 1639
- New College, Teachers College, Columbia University, 1932–1939
- New College Franklin, Tennessee

== See also ==
- New School (disambiguation)
