= Back door =

A back door is a door in the rear of a building. Back door may also refer to:

== Arts and media ==
- Back Door (jazz trio), a British group.
- Porta dos Fundos (literally “Back Door” in Portuguese) Brazilian comedy YouTube channel.
- Works so titled:
  - The Back Door (fiction), a 1897 work serialised in Hong Kong
  - "Back Door", a 1969 sound single by Rhinoceros (band)
  - Musical albums:
    - Back Door (album), a 1972 by English jazz trio Back Door
    - The Back Door (album), a 1992 album by American band Cherish the Ladies
  - Songs:
    - "Back Door", a 2020 song by South Korean boy group Stray Kids from the album In Life
    - "Backdoor" (song), a 2020 song by American rapper Lil Durk
    - "Back Door", a 2021 song by American rapper Pop Smoke from the album Faith
    - "Backd00r", a 2025 song by American rapper Playboi Carti

== Other uses ==
- Backdoor (computing), a hidden method for bypassing normal computer authentication systems
- Backdoor (basketball), a play in which a player gets behind the defense and receives a pass for an easy score
- Backdoor Bay, Ross Island, Antarctica

== See also ==
- Backdoor pilot, the use of existing series in assessing potential audience reaction to a proposed television series
- Backdoor breaking ball, a type of pitch
- Backdoor.Win32.IRCBot, a computer worm
- Music:
  - Backdoor progression, in music theory, characteristic harmonic device used in many "jazz standards"
  - Works:
    - "Back Door Man", a 1960 blues song, written by Willie Dixon & recorded by Howlin' Wolf
    - "Back Door Santa", a 1968 blues song written by Clarence Carter and Marcus Daniel
    - "Lookin' out My Back Door", a rock song by Creedence Clearwater Revival, on their 1970 album Cosmo's Factory
