= Arrival Heights Laboratory =

Joint NZ-US Research Site

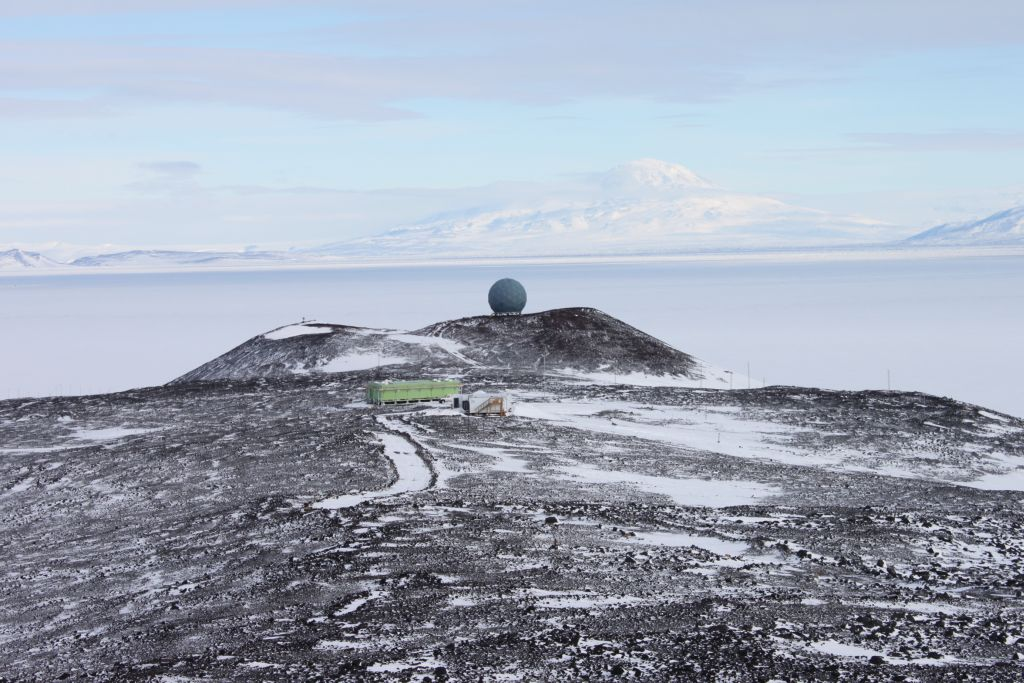
- Looking south from the foot of Second Crater with Mount Discovery in the background

- Location of the Arrival Heights Laboratory in Antarctica
- Coordinates: 77°49′48″S 166°39′44″E
- Countries: New Zealand; United States
- Governing Treaty: Antarctic Treaty System (1961- present )
- Administered by: Antarctica New Zealand, United States Antarctic Program
- Status: Operational

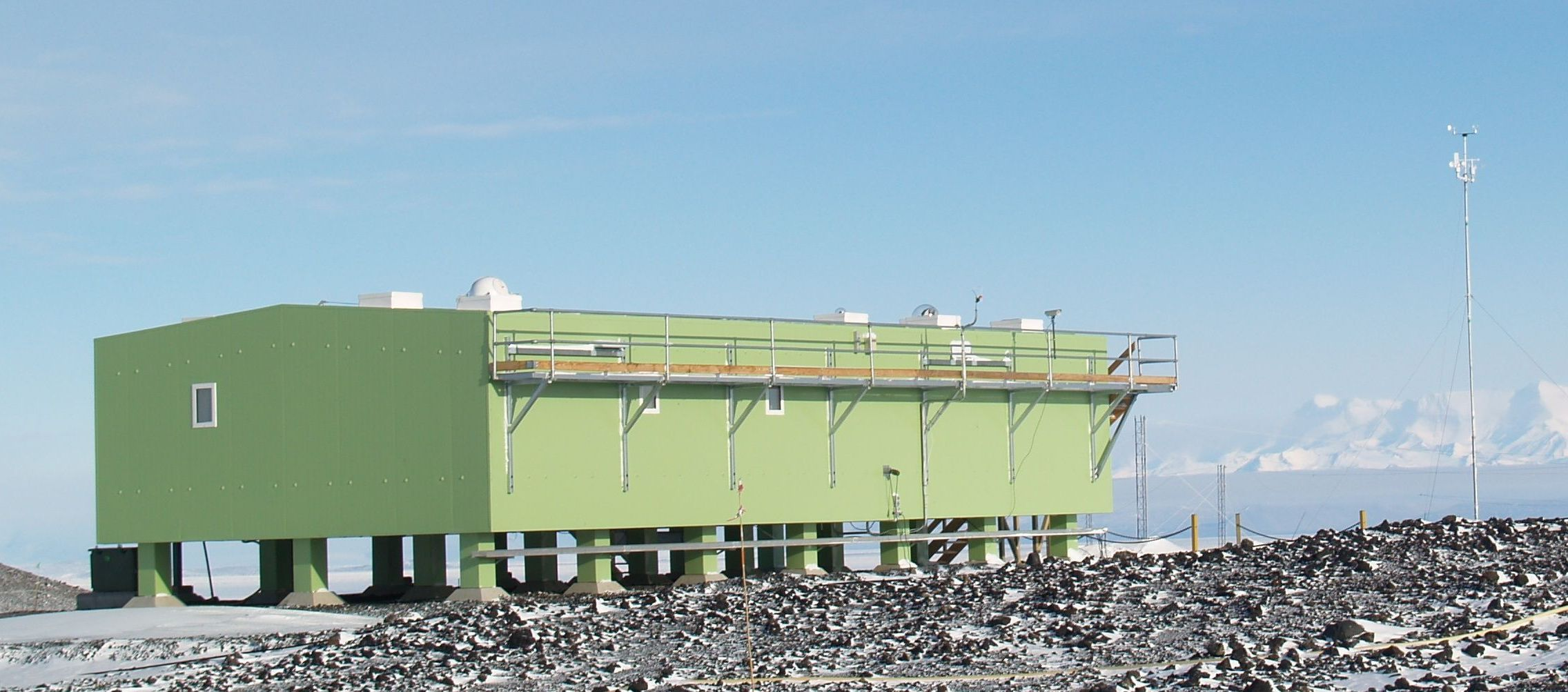
New Zealand's laboratory

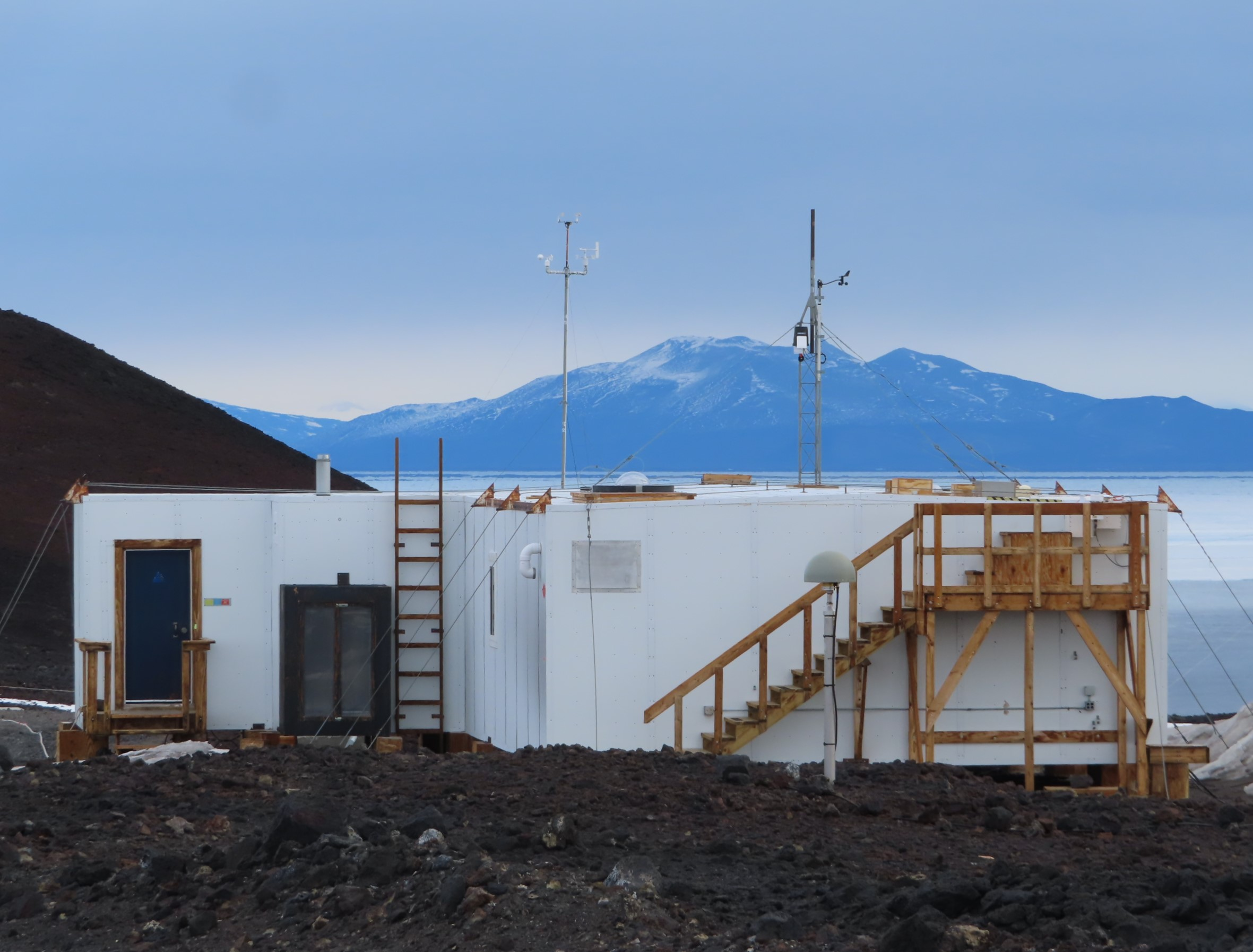
United States' laboratory

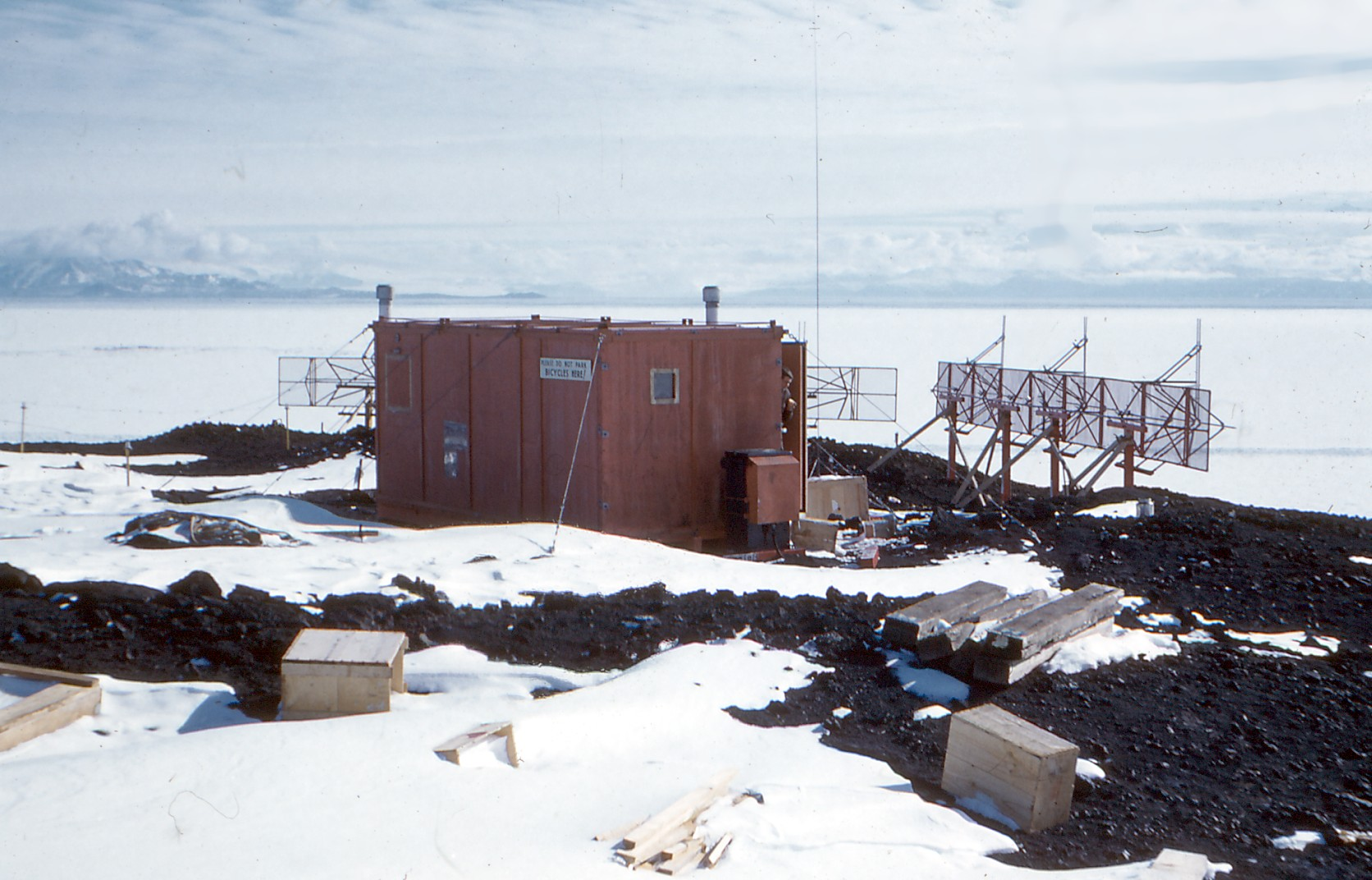
The initial Aurora radar and hut, 1959

The Arrival Heights Laboratory is located in the Antarctic Specially Protected Area number 122 of Arrival Heights in Antarctica. The laboratory is staffed by personnel from both McMurdo Station (US) and Scott Base (NZ).

== History ==
Map of Hut Point Peninsula showing the Arrival Heights Laboratory in relation to McMurdo Station and Scott Base.

The United States proposed the creation of the Arrival Heights Antarctic Specially Protected Area (ASPA). The ASPA is located on the Hut Point Peninsula, Ross Island, and is around 0.73 km^{2} in size. Scott Base and McMurdo Station are located 1.5 km and 2.7 km away respectively and personnel from both locations use Arrival Heights Laboratory.

The Arrival Heights Laboratory consists of a green elevated building (NZ) and a white hut (US) located within area 122 of the Antarctic Specially Protected Area. The area is an electromagnetic quiet zone, but some electronic noise was created by the installation of wind turbines in 2009.

Scientists from New Zealand came to area 122 in 1959. An Auroral Radar Station was established by New Zealand at Arrival Heights in 1959. 15 tonnes of radar and building materials were brought to the area in February 1960, and Arrival Heights Laboratory was completed in two days. The initial purpose of the base was to understand the nature of the aurora australis and its effect on radio communications. A new radar hut and storage facilities were constructed in December 1963. It currently researches upper atmosphere, trace gas monitoring, geomagnetic studies, and air quality surveys, most of which are conducted by NIWA.

== Activities ==
Lidars are hosted by Arrival Heights Laboratory for McMurdo Station. Equipment for low frequency radar and aurora studies is housed at the laboratory for universities. It houses both New Zealand and United States instrumentation, including a Dobson ozone spectrophotometer. The remote location makes the laboratory particularly suitable for the use of instruments sensitive to local and external noise and electromagnetic interference.

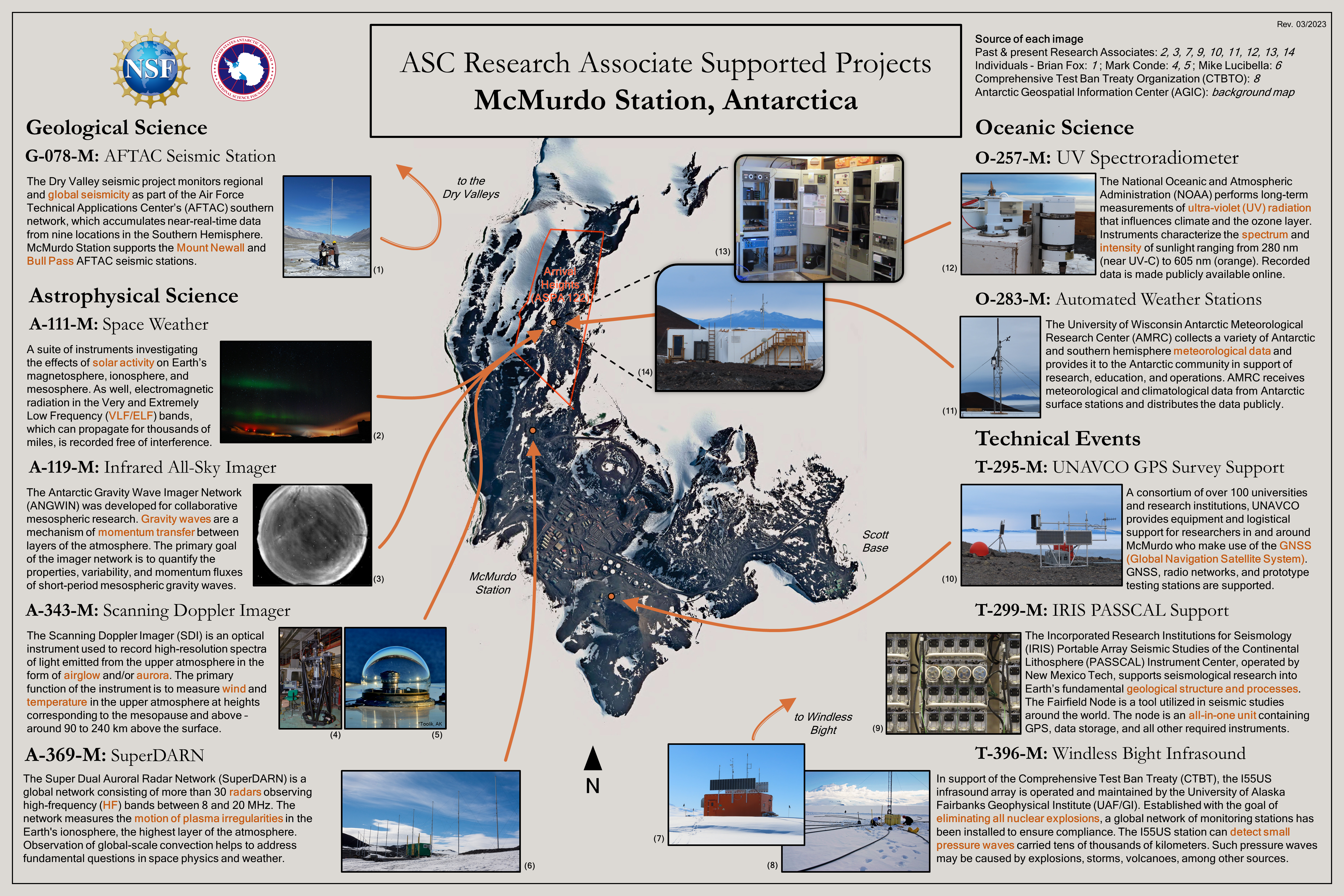
A poster of projects supported by the United States Antarctic Program Research Associate, of which a majority are located at Arrival Heights.

== Climate ==
Between February 1999 and April 2009, the maximum temperature in the area was 7.1 °C on 30 December 2001, while the minimum was -49.8 °C on 21 July 2004. Air quality monitoring started in 1992, and the quality has declined as of 2023, due to emissions from McMurdo Station or Scott Base.

== Works cited ==
=== News ===
- Barraclough, Breanna (20 March 2018). "Antarctica's 'Area 51': Venturing inside the lab you need government clearance to see". Stuff. Archived from the original on 17 June 2025.

=== Web ===
- "2022-2023 USAP Field Season". United States Antarctic Program. Archived from the original on 17 June 2025.
- "Arrival Heights". Scott Base. Archived from the original on 2 June 2010.
- "Arrival Heights Laboratory". Radio New Zealand. Archived from the original on 17 June 2025.
- "Management Plan for Antarctic Specially Protected Area No. 122" (PDF). Antarctic Treaty System. Archived (PDF) from the original on 3 December 2024.
