= Cuthona crinita =

Scientific classification
- Kingdom: Animalia
- Phylum: Mollusca
- Class: Gastropoda
- Order: Nudibranchia
- Suborder: Aeolidacea
- Family: Cuthonidae
- Genus: Cuthona
- Species: C. crinita

Binomial name
- Cuthona crinita (Minichev, 1972)

Species of gastropod

Cuthona crinita is a species of sea slug, an aeolid nudibranch, a marine gastropod mollusc in the family Cuthonidae.

== Distribution ==
This species was described from Mabus Point and Cape Khmara, Queen Mary Land, Antarctica. It is also reported from Arrival Heights, McMurdo Sound, Ross Sea, Antarctica, 77°50′14.29″S 166°37′59.14″E.

== Description ==
This species has a maximum size of 45 mm. The body is translucent white and there is an opaque white line at the edge of the foot. The rhinophores and oral tentacles are opaque white and the outer half to one third of each ceras is covered with opaque white pigment. The digestive gland within the cerata is grey and usually pale maroon-red at the base.
