= Berthelot Islands =

Collection of islands in Antarctica

- Location within Antarctica Location within Antarctic Peninsula

Geography
- Location: Antarctica
- Coordinates: 65°20′S 64°9′W

Administration
- Administered under the Antarctic Treaty System

Demographics
- Population: Uninhabited

The Berthelot Islands are a group of rocky islands, the largest 2 km (1 mi) long, lying 3 km (2 mi) south-west of Deliverance Point, off the west coast of Graham Land, Antarctica. They were discovered by the French Antarctic Expedition, 1903–05, under Jean-Baptiste Charcot, and named by him for Marcellin Berthelot, a prominent French chemist. One of the group, Green Island, is protected as Antarctic Specially Protected Area (ASPA) No.108 because of its relatively luxuriant vegetation and large Antarctic shag colony.

== See also ==
- List of Antarctic and subantarctic islands
- Urchin Rock
