= Bedek Stream =

Antarctic stream

Location of Byers Peninsula on Livingston Island in the South Shetland Islands

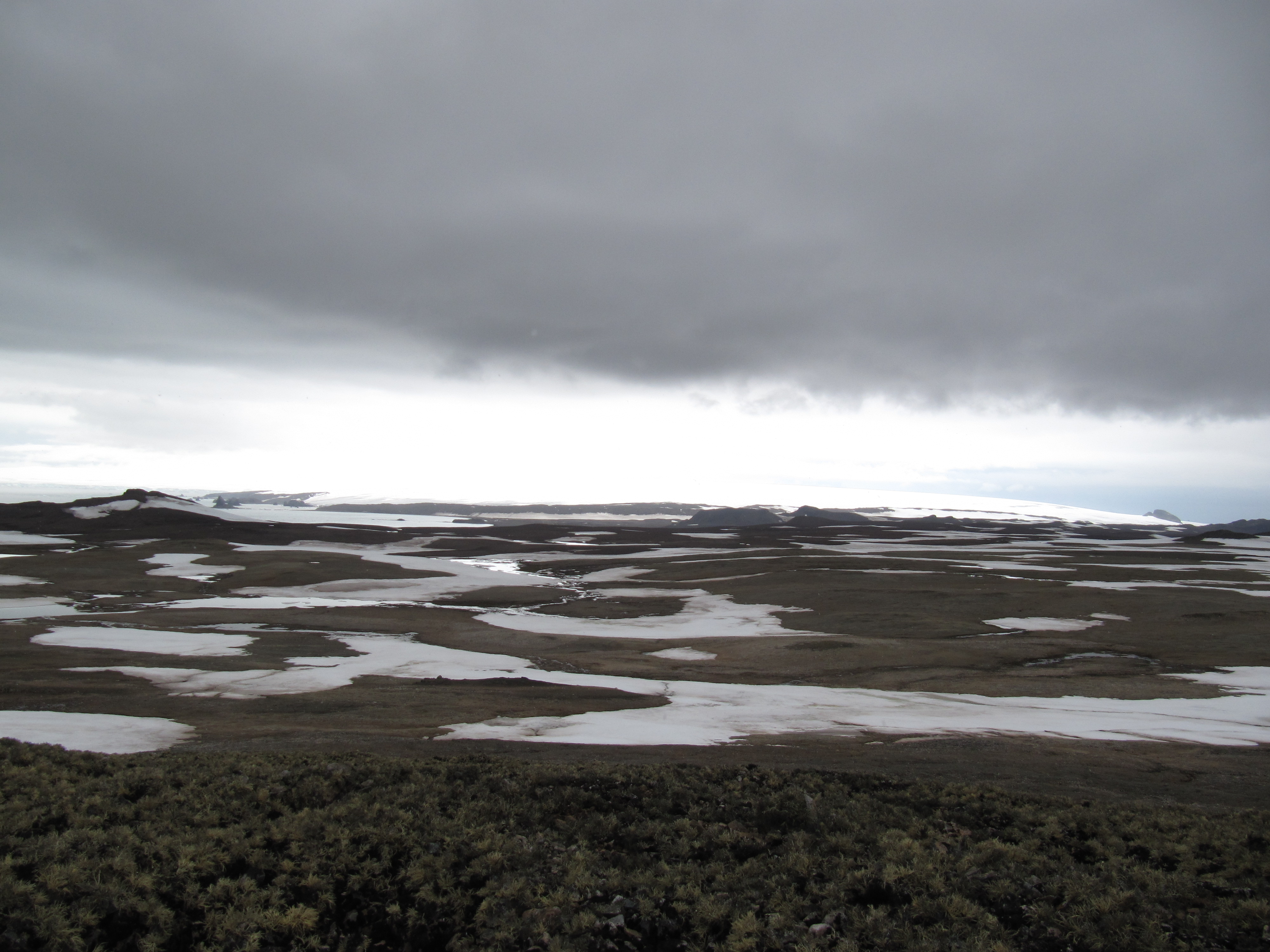
Eastern Byers Peninsula in Livingston Island with Robbery Beaches and Tsamblak Hill in the middle, and left to right Rowe Point, Ivanov Beach, Urvich Wall and Clark Nunatak in the background

Topographic map of Antarctic Specially Protected Area ASPA 126 Byers Peninsula

Topographic map of Livingston, Greenwich, Robert, Snow and Smith Islands

Bedek Stream (Bulgarian: Бедечки поток, romanized: Bedechki potok, IPA: [bɛˈdɛt͡ʃki poˈtɔk]) is the 3.2 km long stream on eastern Byers Peninsula, Livingston Island in the South Shetland Islands, Antarctica draining the lakes of Oread and Montemno. It flows northwards along the west side of Urvich Wall and the east side of Tsamblak Hill, crosses Robbery Beaches and empties into Barclay Bay just east of Sparadok Point. The area was visited by early 19th century sealers.

Bedek is a Thracian toponym preserved in the names of Big and Little Bedek Peaks, and Bedechka River in Central Bulgaria.

== Location ==
Bedek Stream is centred at 62°38′14″S 60°59′08″W. Detailed Spanish mapping in 1992, and Bulgarian mapping of the area in 2009 and 2017.

== Maps ==
- Península Byers, Isla Livingston. Mapa topográfico a escala 1:25000. Madrid: Servicio Geográfico del Ejército, 1992
- L. Ivanov. Antarctica: Livingston Island and Greenwich, Robert, Snow and Smith Islands. Scale 1:120000 topographic map. Troyan: Manfred Wörner Foundation, 2009. ISBN 978-954-92032-6-4
- L. Ivanov. Antarctica: Livingston Island and Smith Island. Scale 1:100000 topographic map. Manfred Wörner Foundation, 2017. ISBN 978-619-90008-3-0
- Antarctic Digital Database (ADD). Scale 1:250000 topographic map of Antarctica. Scientific Committee on Antarctic Research (SCAR). Since 1993, regularly upgraded and updated

== See also ==
- Livingston Island
