= Taylor Rookery =

Important Bird Area of Antarctica

Coordinates: 67°27′12″S 60°53′10″E

Location in Antarctica

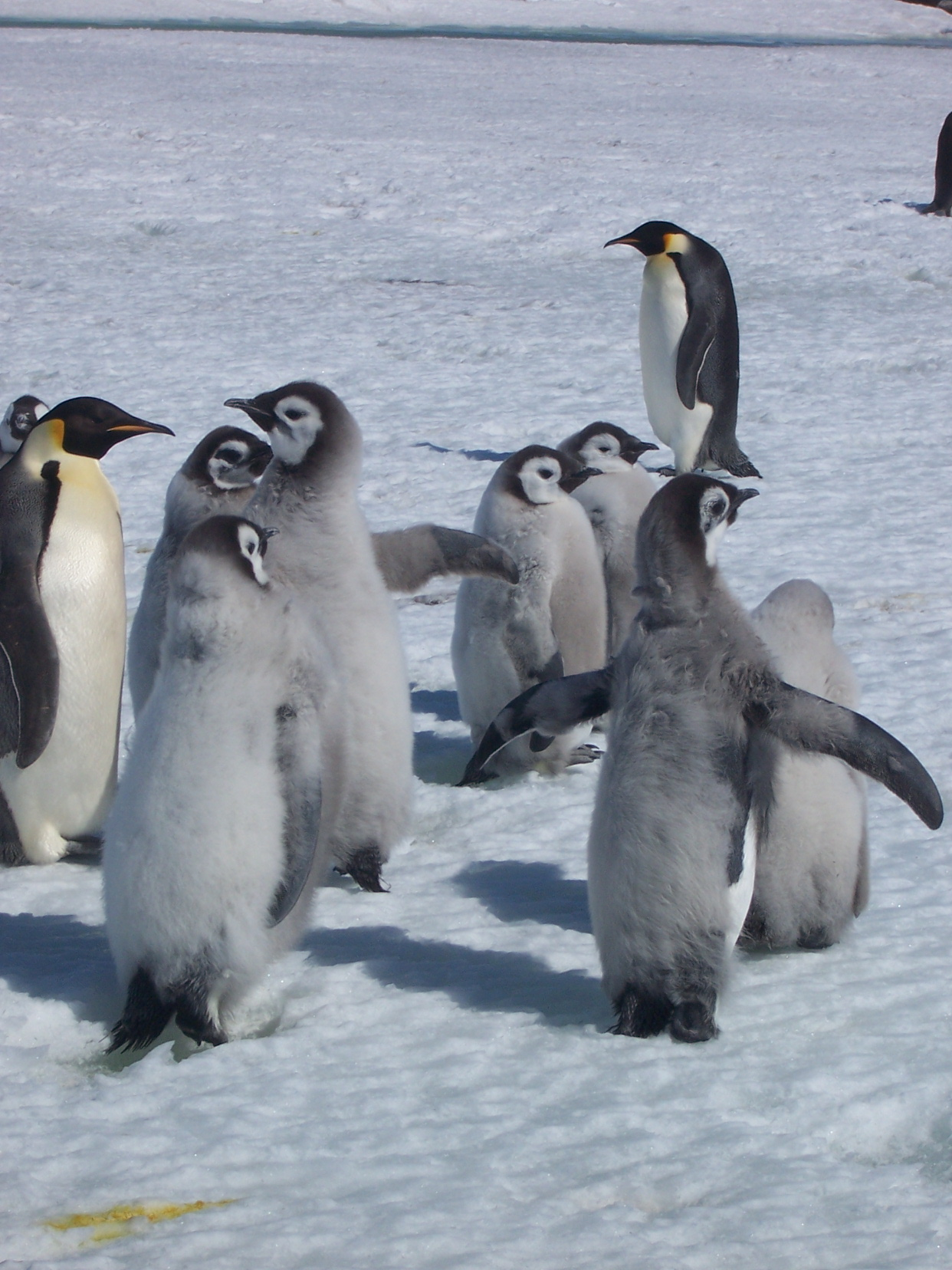
Emperor penguins with chicks

Taylor Rookery is an emperor penguin breeding colony in Antarctica. It is the larger of the two known entirely land-based colonies of the species, most of which are situated on sea ice. It is important because it is probably the largest colony of the species to occur on land and has been regularly monitored.

== Description ==
The colony site lies some 90 km west of Australia’s Mawson Station on the Mawson Coast of Mac. Robertson Land in East Antarctica. The rookery is on a low rock outcrop at the south-west corner of a bay formed by Taylor Glacier to the west, the Antarctic ice cap to the south, the islands of the Colbeck Archipelago to the east, and is bordered by sea ice to the east and north.

It is ideal for population monitoring since it is surrounded by low, rocky hills which make it possible to see every bird without entering the breeding area. A long-term count program of the emperor penguin population at Taylor Rookery has been taking place since 1954. The number of penguins averaged about 3000 breeding pairs over the 15 years from 1988 to 2002 and appears stable. The site is protected under the Antarctic Treaty System as Antarctic Specially Protected Area (ASPA) No.101. The 26 ha site has also been designated an Important Bird Area (IBA) by BirdLife International.
