= Mirounga Point =

Mirounga Point (62°14′S 58°41′W) is the east entrance point to Potter Cove, King George Island, in the South Shetland Islands off Antarctica. The feature was called "Punta Baliza" (beacon point) by R. Araya and F. Herve in 1966. It was later called "Punta Elefante" by the Argentine Antarctic Expedition after the elephant seal (Mirounga leonina), in connection with the establishment of Site of Special Scientific Interest number 13 (now Antarctic Specially Protected Area 132) in this vicinity under the Antarctic Treaty. The approved name avoids the duplication of Elephant Point on Livingston Island.
