= Lynch Island =

Island in the South Orkney Islands, Antarctica

Coordinates: 60°39′S 45°36′W

Location of Lynch Island in the South Orkney Islands.

Lynch Island is an island lying in the eastern part of Marshall Bay, close off the south coast of Coronation Island in the South Orkney Islands, Antarctica.

== History ==
The island was roughly charted in 1912–13 by Petter Sørlle, a Norwegian whaling captain, and surveyed in 1933 by Discovery Investigations personnel. The island was resurveyed in 1948–49 by the Falkland Islands Dependencies Survey and named by the UK Antarctic Place-Names Committee for Thomas Lynch, an American sealer who visited the South Orkney Islands in the schooner Express in 1880.

== Antarctic Specially Protected Area ==
The island has been designated an Antarctic Specially Protected Area (ASPA 110) for its biological values, especially its relatively luxuriant plant communities. The continent's only two flowering plants, Antarctic hair grass and Antarctic pearlwort, are abundant. The soils associated with the grass swards contain a rich invertebrate fauna.

== See also ==
- List of Antarctic and subantarctic islands
