= Backdoor Bay =

Bay in Antarctica

- Location within Antarctica
- Location: Ross Island, Antarctica
- Coordinates: 77°34′S 166°12′E
- Basin countries: Antarctica

Backdoor Bay (77°34′S 166°12′E) is a small bay at the east side of Cape Royds, along the west side of Ross Island, Antarctica.

== History ==
The British Antarctic Expedition, 1907–09, under Ernest Shackleton, unloaded supplies at Backdoor Bay to use at their winter headquarters on Cape Royds. It was named so by them as it lies at the back (east) side of Cape Royds, opposite to the small cove on the west side of the cape, called the "Front Door Bay".

== Antarctic Specially Protected Area ==
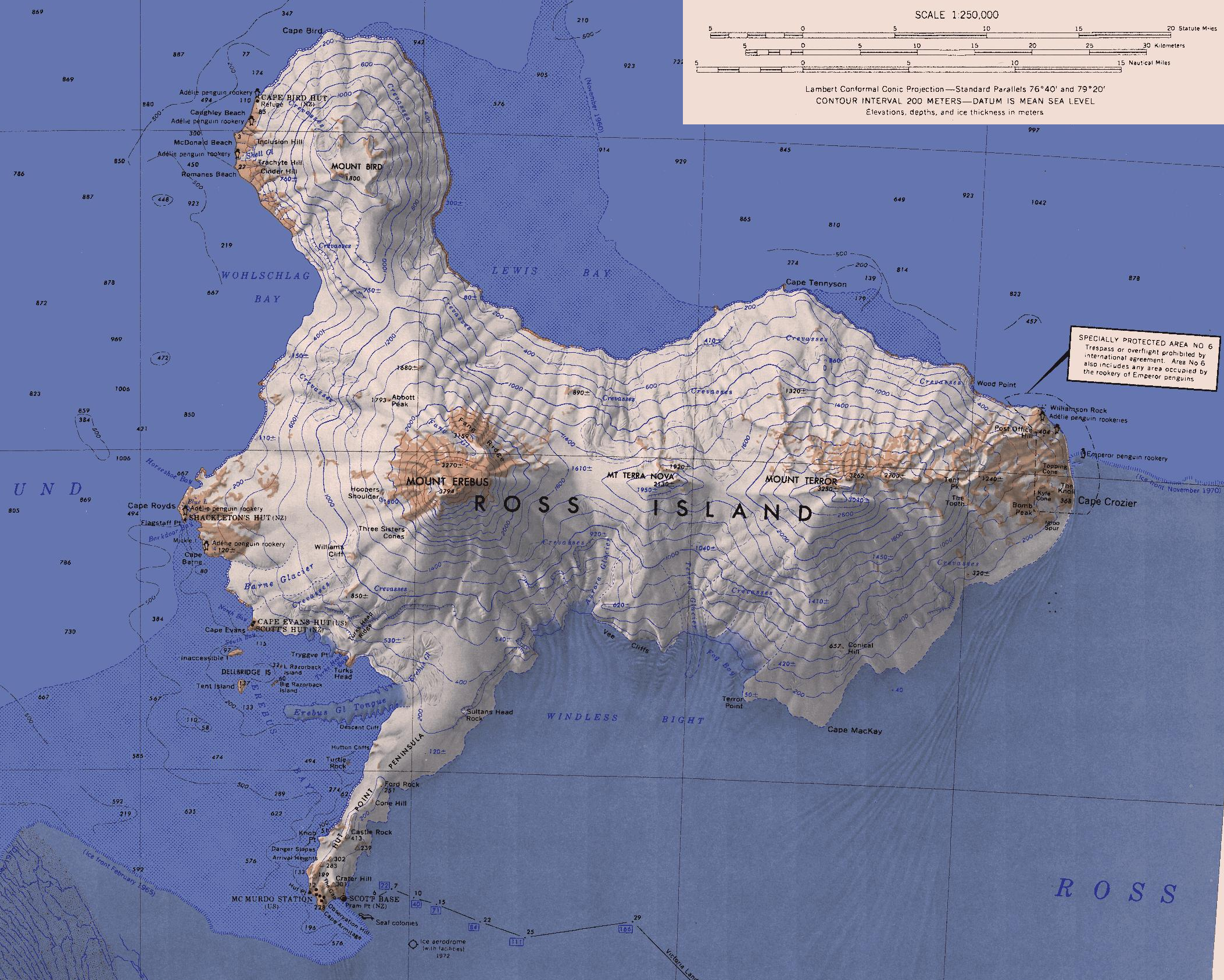
Cape Royds in west

Cape Royds is the most western point of Ross Island, about 40 kilometres (25 mi) south of Cape Bird and 35 kilometres (22 mi) north of the Hut Point Peninsula. It is free of ice, with basalt bedrock covered in glacial till. Part of the Backdoor Bay area is protected as Antarctic Specially Protected Area (ASPA) No.157 because of its historical associations and artefacts. The protected area covers about 4 hectares (9.9 acres). It is just east of a protected colony of Adélie penguins. South polar skuas (Stercorarius maccormicki) nest nearby.

The protected area contains Shackleton's Hut, built in February 1908, as well as stables, kennels, a latrine, a garage for what was the first motor vehicle in Antarctica, an instrument shelter, supply depots and a rubbish site. The Nimrod Expedition made some of the earliest advances in Antarctic earth sciences, meteorology and the study of flora and fauna at this site, one of the main areas where humans were first active in Antarctica.

== Sources ==
- Alberts, Fred G., ed. (1995), Geographic Names of the Antarctic (PDF) (2 ed.), United States Board on Geographic Names This article incorporates public domain material from websites or documents of the United States Board on Geographic Names.
- "Backdoor Bay, Cape Royds, Ross Island" (PDF), Management Plan for Antarctic Specially Protected Area No. 157: Measure 2, Annex J, Antarctic Treaty Secretariat, 2005
