= Green Island, Antarctica =

Antarctic island

Coordinates: 65°19′S 64°09′W

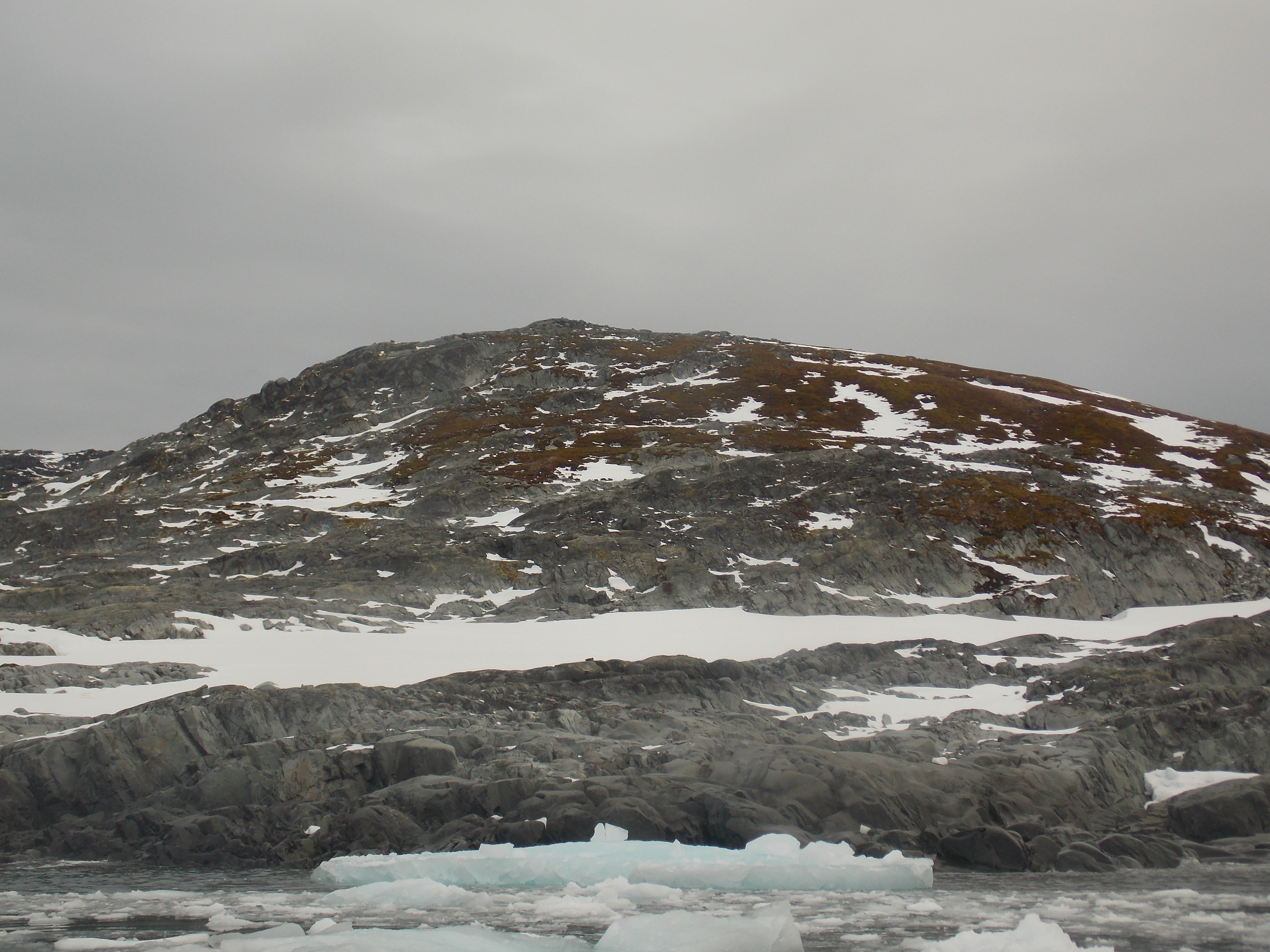
Green Island in 2014

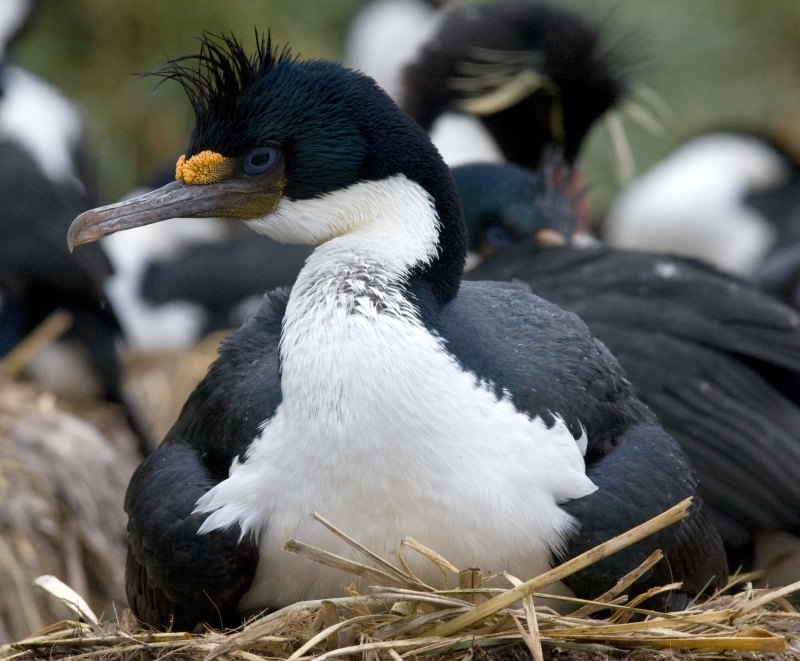
The island is home to a large colony of Antarctic shags

Green Island is one of the Berthelot Islands group, lying off the west coast of Graham Land, Antarctica.

== Description ==
The island is about 20 ha in area. It lies 150 m north of the largest of the Berthelot Islands group, some 3 km off the Graham Coast of the Antarctic Peninsula. It is 520 m long from north to south and 500 m wide from east to west, rising to a rounded peak 83 m high. It rises steeply on all sides, with precipitous cliffs on the southern and eastern sides.

=== Antarctic Specially Protected Area ===
It is protected as Antarctic Specially Protected Area (ASPA) No.108 because of its vegetation which was described as "probably the most luxuriant anywhere on the west side of the Antarctic Peninsula". On its north-facing slopes it has well-developed banks of moss turf formed by Polytrichum strictum and Chorisodontium aciphyllum overlying peat more than a metre deep. Antarctic hair grass grows in small patches on the steep, rocky north-western corner of the island near a colony of 500–600 Antarctic shags, one of the largest on the Antarctic Peninsula.
