= Linnaeus Terrace =

Coordinates: 77°36′S 161°5′E

Linnaeus Terrace is a rock terrace on the north side of Oliver Peak in the Asgard Range of Victoria Land, Antarctica. It is protected under the Antarctic Treaty System as Antarctic Specially Protected Area No.138 because it is one of the richest known sites for the cryptoendolithic communities that colonise the Beacon Sandstone.

== History ==
The terrace was mapped by the United States Geological Survey from U.S. Navy aerial photographs taken in 1970. The name was proposed to the Advisory Committee on Antarctic Names by biologist Imre Friedmann who established a United States Antarctic Research Program field camp on this terrace in December 1980 for the study of microbial flora living in rocks. The site is named after Swedish botanist Carl Linnaeus, the first person to enunciate the principles for defining genera and species and to adhere to a uniform use of the binomial system for naming plants and animals.
