= Narębski Point =

Coordinates: 62°14′18″S 58°46′30″W

Narębski Point is a headland on the south-east coast of the Barton Peninsula, at the south-western end of King George Island, in the South Shetland Islands of Antarctica with an average elevation of 0 feet (0 m) above sea level. Korea’s King Sejong Station lies 2 km (1.2 mi) to the north-east.

== Antarctic Specially Protected Area ==
The land adjacent to the point has been designated an Antarctic Specially Protected Area (ASPA 171) primarily to protect its ecological, scientific and aesthetic values from human interference. The size of the site is about 1 km^{2}. It is geologically complex and rich in flora and fauna, with an extensive cover of mosses and lichens There are large colonies of chinstrap and gentoo penguins. Other birds recorded as breeding at the site in smaller numbers are brown and south polar skuas, kelp gulls, Antarctic terns, Wilson's storm petrels, southern giant petrels and snowy sheathbills.
