= Urchin Rock =

Urchin Rock (65°19′S 64°16′W) is a rock, over which the sea breaks, lying 2.3 nautical miles (4.3 km) west of the largest of the Berthelot Islands, off the west coast of Graham Land. First shown on an Argentine government chart of 1957. So named by the United Kingdom Antarctic Place-Names Committee (UK-APC) in 1959 because the rock is a hazard on the edge of Grandidier Channel; an urchin is a roguish or mischievous boy.
