= Caughley Beach =

Beach of Antarctica

- Location within Antarctica
- Location: Ross Island, Antarctica
- Coordinates: 77°13′S 166°26′E
- Basin countries: Antarctica

Caughley Beach (77°13′S 166°26′E) is the northernmost beach on the ice-free coast south-west of Cape Bird, Ross Island, Antarctica. It was mapped by the New Zealand Geological Survey Antarctic Expedition, 1958–59, and named for Graeme Caughley, biologist with the party that visited Cape Bird. New College Valley, Antarctic Specially Protected Area (ASPA) No.116, lies above the beach.

== Important Bird Area ==
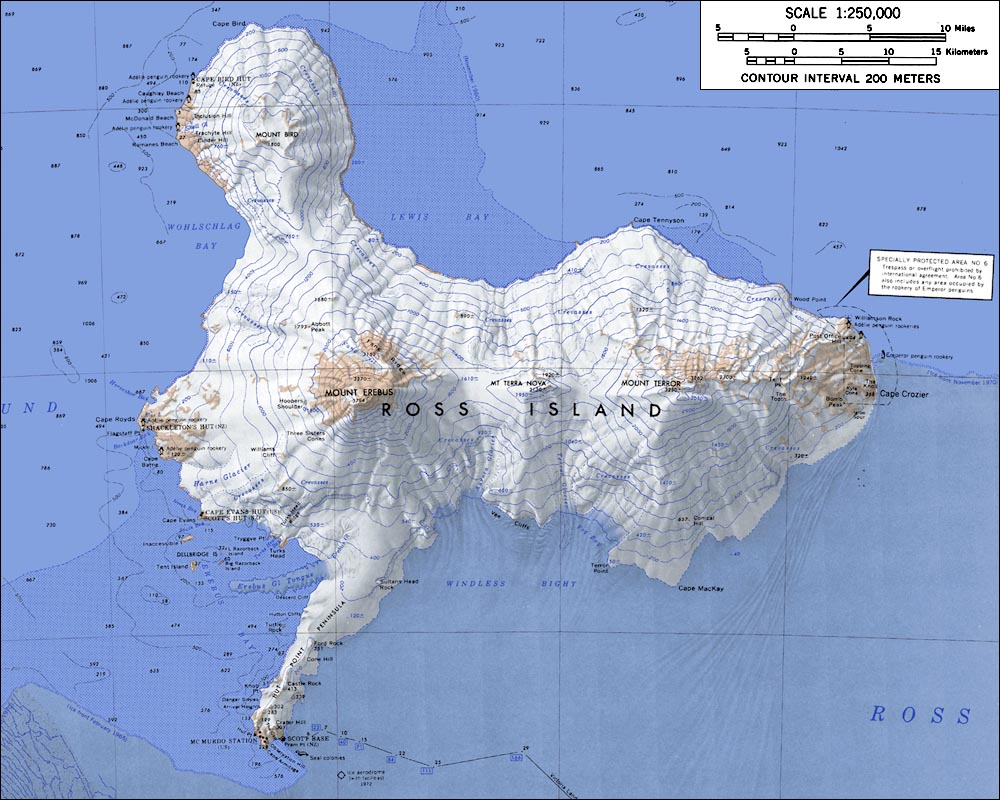
Ross Island. Cape Bird in the northwest

A 103 hectares (250 acres) site at Caughley Beach has been designated an Important Bird Area (IBA) by BirdLife International because it supports a colony of about 40,000 breeding pairs of Adélie penguins, the largest of three at Cape Bird. There are an estimated 140 breeding pairs of south polar skua within 1,000 metres (3,300 ft) of the Adélie penguin colony. Other species seen in the vicinity include Weddell seals (Leptonychotes weddellii), crabeater seals (Lobodon carcinophagus), leopard seals (Hydrurga leptonyx) and killer whales (Orcinus orca).

== New College Valley ==
New College Valley lies south of Cape Bird, on ice-free slopes above Caughley Beach. It faces north-west and carries meltwater from the Cape Bird ice cap during the summer. It is protected as Antarctic Specially Protected Area (ASPA) No.116 because it contains some of the richest stands of mosses, with associated microflora and fauna, in the Ross Sea region.

== Sources ==
- Alberts, Fred G., ed. (1995), Geographic Names of the Antarctic (PDF) (2 ed.), United States Board on Geographic Names This article incorporates public domain material from websites or documents of the United States Board on Geographic Names.
- "Caughley Beach", BirdLife Data Zone, BirdLife International, 2015
- Management Plan for Antarctic Specially Protected Area No. 116: Measure 1, Annex A (PDF), New College Valley, Caughley Beach, Cape Bird, Ross Island, Antarctic Treaty Secretariat, 2006
