= Tramway Ridge =

Ridge on Mount Erebus

Coordinates: 77°31′S 167°6′E

Tramway Ridge is a ridge that rises to about 3450 m above sea level in the north-west part of the summit caldera of Mount Erebus on Ross Island, Antarctica. The ridge is formed by the levees (banks) on the side of a young lava flow. The appearance of the feature is suggestive of a set of railway or tram lines.

== Antarctic Specially Protected Area ==
The lower end of the ridge is protected as Antarctic Specially Protected Area (ASPA) No.130 because it supports a scientifically unusual ecosystem of exceptional value to botanists, phycologists and microbiologists. Mount Erebus is one of only three known high altitude sites with fumarolic activity and associated vegetation in Antarctica, the other two being Mounts Melbourne and Rittmann.
