= Potter Peninsula =

Peninsula of Antarctica

Coordinates: 62°14′44″S 58°39′28″W

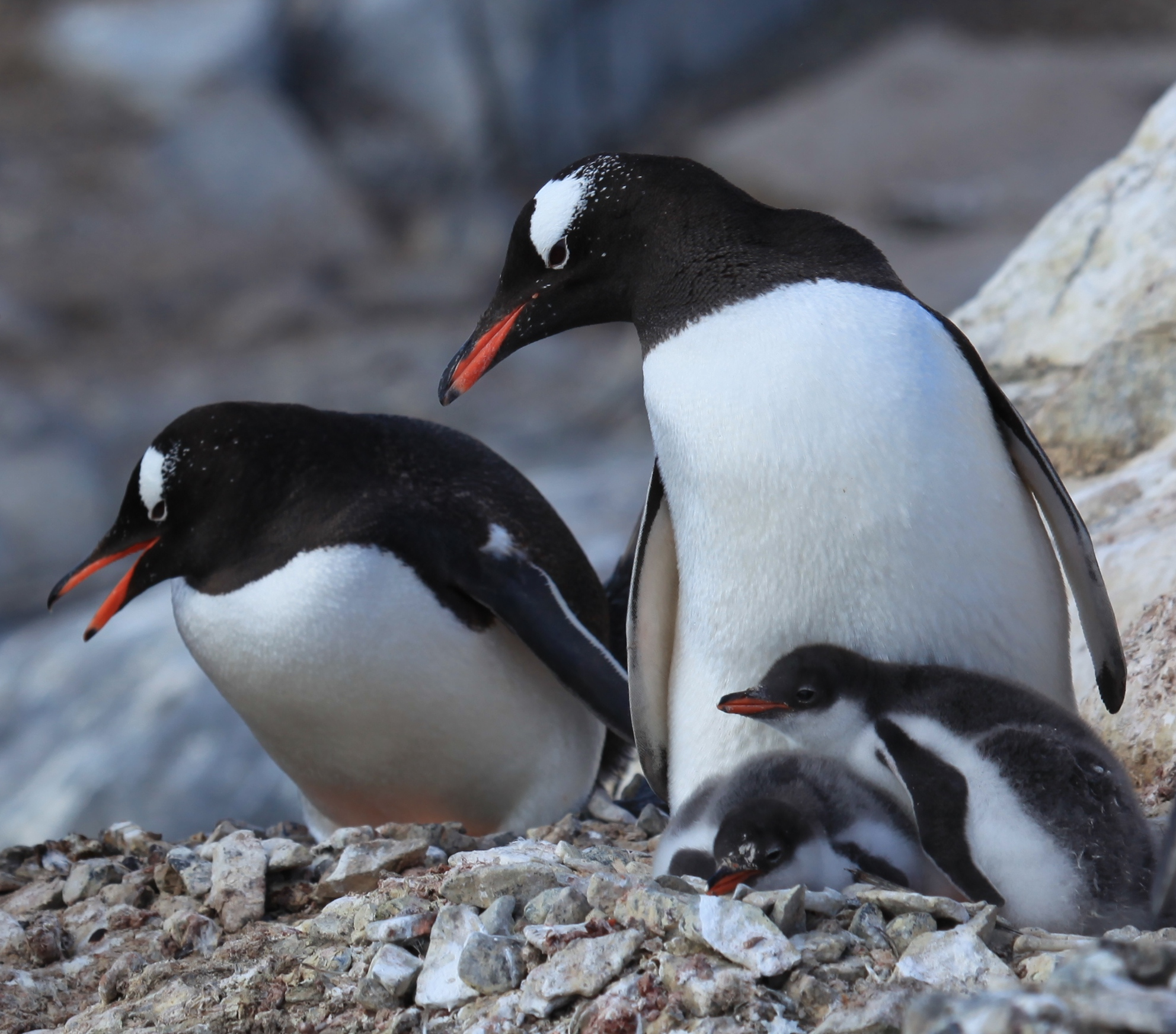
Gentoo penguins breed in the IBA

Potter Peninsula is a low ice-free peninsula between Potter Cove and Stranger Point in south-west King George Island, in the South Shetland Islands of Antarctica. It is protected as ASPA 132, largely because of the richness and diversity of its flora and fauna.

== History ==
The peninsula was named "Peninsula Potter", in association with Potter Cove, by Chilean geologists Roberto Araya and Francisco Hervé in 1966, following field work there. The English form of the name has been accepted.

== Important Bird Area ==
The peninsula has been identified as an Important Bird Area (IBA) by BirdLife International because it supports a wide range of bird colonies including over 14,000 pairs of Adélie penguins, 2000 pairs of gentoo penguins and 265 pairs of chinstrap penguins. Other species found nesting at the site are south polar skuas, southern giant petrels, black-bellied and Wilson's storm petrels, Cape petrels, imperial shags, snowy sheathbills, brown skuas, kelp gulls and Antarctic terns.
