= Arrival Heights =

Geological feature in Antarctica

Coordinates: 77°49′S 166°39′E

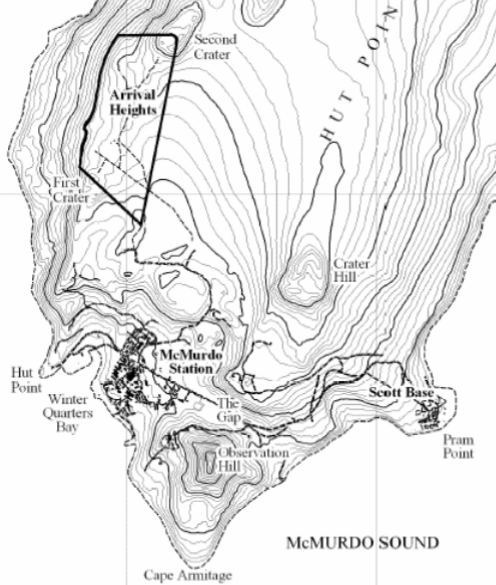
Map displaying the Arrival Heights ASPA boundary, sourced from Reference 1.

Arrival Heights are clifflike heights which extend in a north-east–south-west direction along the west side of Hut Point Peninsula, just north of Hut Point in Ross Island, Antarctica. They were discovered and named by the British National Antarctic Expedition, 1901–04, under Robert Falcon Scott. The name suggests the expedition's arrival at its winter headquarters at nearby Hut Point.

== Antarctic Specially Protected Area ==
An area at Arrival Heights was originally protected because its geographical characteristics, such as its elevated position and broad viewing horizon, as well as the volcanic crater morphology, made it useful as a “quiet” (lacking electromagnetic interference) site for atmospheric studies. It has the logistic support of McMurdo Station 1.5 km to the south, and Scott Base 3 km to the south-east, and continues to be protected as Antarctic Specially Protected Area (ASPA) No.122 (est. 1975) for its value in upper atmospheric research and boundary layer air sampling studies.

== Atmospheric research ==
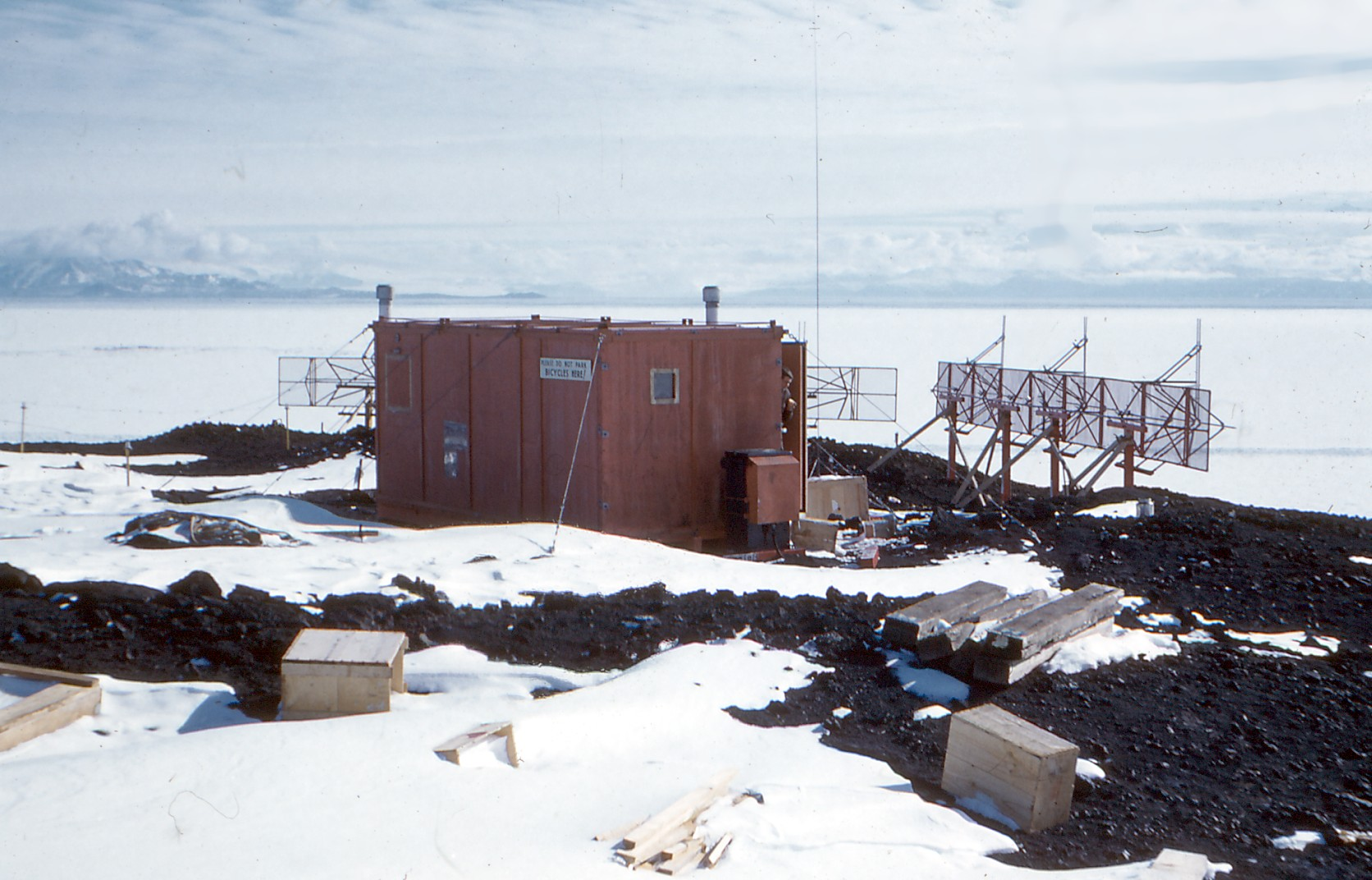
Auroral radar installed at Arrival Heights, circa 1959

Upper atmospheric research started at Arrival Heights in 1959 with the establishment of an unmanned auroral radar station by the New Zealand's Department of Scientific and Industrial Research (DSIR) in partnership with Stanford University (USA). This was to coincide with other Antarctic atmospheric research activities as part of the 1957 IGY programme including the establishment of a full geomagnetic observatory, vertical incident ionosonde station and AZA transmitter at Scott Base. Over the next 10–15 years a variety of additional DSIR equipment was added, including an auroral camera along with American scientific investigations.

In 1982 a MF-radar was installed by the Physics Department at the University of Canterbury, New Zealand to measure D-region winds in the ionosphere.

Coincidentally, also in 1982 the first stratospheric trace gas remote sensing uv/vis grating spectrometer was installed by DSIR, New Zealand to measure nitrogen dioxide abundance in the polar atmosphere. With the discovery of the Antarctic ozone hole a cascade of remote sensing instrumentation was installed by the DSIR (known as NIWA from 1992) over the next 10–15 years focusing on taking measurements for stratospheric heterogeneous chemistry and ozone depletion research. In 1988 DSIR started a research programme to obtain in situ flask samples for greenhouse gas and carbon isotope analysis. Both the in situ and remote sensing measurements are an important part in global atmospheric monitoring networks such as GAW and the NDACC.

In 2007, the new Arrival Heights Laboratory was built.

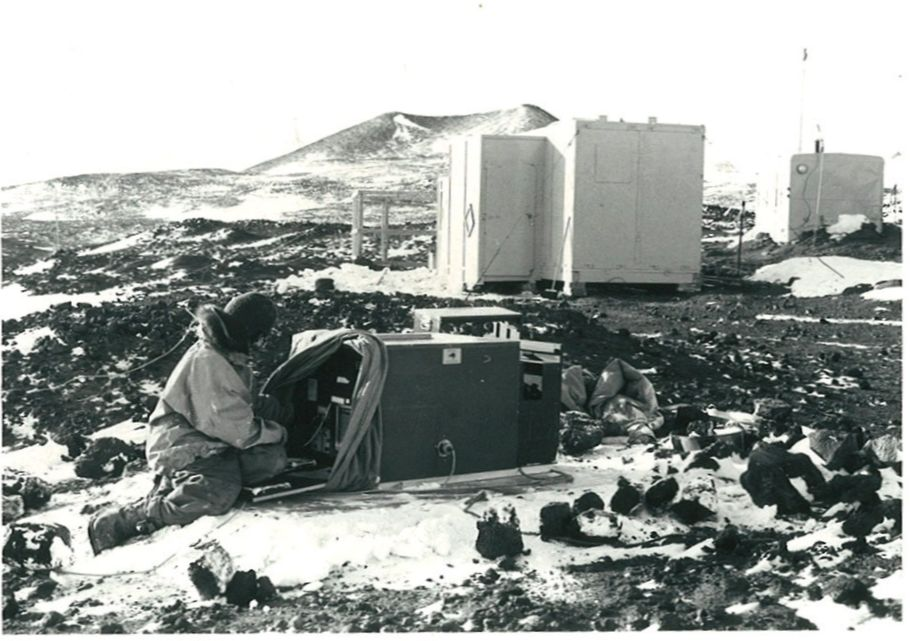
S. G. Clarke at the controls of a photometer as part of a survey to assess sky brightness and light pollution at Arrival Heights, 1974
