= Stranger Point =

Coordinates: 62°15′42″S 58°37′03″W

Stranger Point is a point forming the southernmost tip of King George Island in the South Shetland Islands of Antarctica. It was named by the United Kingdom Antarctic Place-Names Committee (UK-APC) in 1960 for the sealer Stranger (Captained by Joseph Adams) from Boston, which visited the South Shetland Islands in 1820–21 in company with the O'Cain, operating from nearby Potter Cove.
