= New School (disambiguation) =

The New School is a New York City university.

New School may also refer to:

== Educational institutions ==
- The New School of Northern Virginia, United States
- The New School Foundation, Norway
- The New School, a Waldorf school originally in London, later renamed Michael Hall

== Other uses ==
- The New School (album), by The Tough Alliance
- New-school hip hop, a period in hip hop music
- Al-Madrasa al-Ḥadītha ('the New School') an early 20th century Egyptian literary movement
- Newschool skiing
- New school (tattoo), a style and movement in tattooing
- New School Presbyterians, a US Christian denomination existing after the 1837 Old School–New School controversy and the remerger with the Old School Presbyterians after ~1870
