= Potter Township =

Potter Township may refer to:

- Potter Township, Polk County, Arkansas, in Polk County, Arkansas
- Potter Township, Barnes County, North Dakota
- Potter Township, Beaver County, Pennsylvania
- Potter Township, Centre County, Pennsylvania
