= Deliverance Point =

Headland in Antarctica

- Location within Antarctic Peninsula

Highest point
- Coordinates: 65°18′S 64°7′W

Geography
- Location: Graham Land, Antarctic Peninsula

Deliverance Point is a rocky point 2.5 nautical miles (5 km) south of Cape Tuxen on the west coast of Graham Land. It was discovered by the French Antarctic Expedition, 1908–10, under Jean-Baptiste Charcot, and was so named because Charcot and two companions were rescued here after being separated from the ship Pourquoi-Pas? for several days, while on an exploration of the area in a small boat.
