= Potter Box =

Model for making ethical decisions

The Potter Box is a model for making ethical decisions, developed by Ralph B. Potter, Jr., professor of social ethics emeritus at Harvard Divinity School. It is commonly used by communication ethics scholars. According to this model, moral thinking should be a systematic process and how we come to decisions must be based in some reasoning.

== Steps ==
The Potter Box is an ethical framework used to make decisions by utilizing four categories which Potter identifies as universal to all ethical dilemmas. Potter was a theologian when he developed this moral reasoning framework. The Potter Box uses four dimensions of moral analysis to help in situations where ethical dilemmas occur: Facts, Values, Principles, and Loyalties.

The Potter Box consists of a few steps, which can be completed in any order. The user may move between the steps several times before an adequate decision is made. The steps are numbered for simplicity's sake, and Cliff Christians has organized the steps into quadrants.

=== Definition / facts ===
The definition stage of the Potter Box concerns the facts of the issue at hand. Here is where the analyst should set out all facts without making judgments or hiding any facts.

Example: Using a photograph of a car wreck to promote safe driving, making it visible to the target viewers.

=== Values ===
At this stage the analyst should state and compare the merits of different values to acknowledge the influences on decision-making. By referring to the specific concerns of the individuals involved, it allows the analyst to identify differences in perspectives. We may judge something according to aesthetic values (harmonious, pleasing), professional values (innovative, prompt), logical values (consistent, competent), sociocultural values (thrift, hard work), and moral values (honesty, nonviolence).

Example: Will the shock value of the images encourage safe driving habits? Will the images stir up potentially disturbing memories for certain people?

=== Principles ===
Principles are ethical philosophies or modes of ethical reasoning that may be applicable to the situation. By considering the values stated above from several ethical philosophies, the decision-maker is better equipped to understand the situation. The following are some of the ethical philosophies that may be utilized under this segment of Potter's Box:

- Aristotle's Golden Mean. Aristotle's Golden Mean defines moral virtue as a middle state determined by practical wisdom that emphasizes moderation and temperance.
- Confucius' Golden Mean. Confucius' Golden Mean is more commonly known as the compromise principle and says moral virtue is the appropriate location between two extremes.
- Kant's Categorical Imperative. Kant's Categorical Imperative dictates that you must do unto others what you would want them to do unto you, or to act as if your personal decisions and actions could become universal law.
- Mill's Principle of Utility. John Stuart Mill's Principle of Utility dictates that we must seek the greatest happiness for the greatest number of people.
- Rawls' Veil of Ignorance. John Rawls' Veil of Ignorance asks us to assume we don't know which stakeholder position we would find ourselves in, removing our personal interests from the analysis.
- Agape Principle. This principle, also known as the 'Persons as Ends' principle, emphasizes love for our fellow humans and the golden rule. He stresses that when we love our neighbors, we shall seek to do good to them, therefore, we should love fellow humans the same way we love ourselves.

These examples assist the thinker in linking concrete options to overarching principles, aiding introspection and thinking about basic principles.

=== Loyalties ===
Loyalties concern to whom the decision-maker has allegiances or loyalties. For example, in journalism, the first allegiance is always to the public. Other allegiances a journalist might have would be to his or her employer, industry organizations or co-workers. Are we more concerned about being true to our own values or about the effectiveness of the campaign? Is the "greater good" more important than the "golden mean"?
