= Cape Bird =

Extremity of Ross Island in Antarctica

Cape Bird (77°10′S 166°41′E) is a cape which marks the north extremity of Ross Island in Antarctica. It was discovered in 1841 by a British expedition under James Clark Ross, and named by him after Lieutenant Edward J. Bird of the ship HMS Erebus.

== Cape Bird Hut ==
Cape Bird Hut
- Hut
- Location of Cape Bird in Antarctica
- Coordinates: 77°13′05″S 166°26′09″E
- Country: New Zealand
- Location in Antarctica: Beacon Valley; Ross Island; Antarctica
- Administered by: Antarctica New Zealand
- Established: 1966

Population
  - Total: 6
- Type: Seasonal
- Status: Operational

Cape Bird Hut (77°13′05″S 166°26′09″E) is a shelter, built in 1966 with the name of Harrison Laboratory, in order to give a facility to the researchers working at Cape Bird. The hut, which can accommodate six people, was built at Scott Base during the winter and lifted by helicopter to Cape Bird. The shelter was then rebuilt in 1991 nearby the old one designated, in the meantime, as ASPA 116.

== See also ==
- List of Antarctic field camps
