= Antarctic Specially Protected Area =

Protected science area in Antarctica

An Antarctic Specially Protected Area (ASPA) is an area on the continent of Antarctica, or on nearby islands, which is protected by scientists and several different international bodies. The protected areas were established in 1961 under the Antarctic Treaty System, which governs all the land and water south of 60 latitude and protects against human development. A permit is required for entry into any ASPA site. The ASPA sites are protected by the governments of Australia, New Zealand, United States, United Kingdom, Chile, France, Argentina, Poland, Russia, Norway, Japan, India, Italy, and Republic of Korea. There are currently 72 sites.

== List of ASPA sites ==
Number	Name	Description	Adopted	Coordinates	Estimated area	Image
ASPA-101	Taylor Rookery, Mac. Robertson Land	The area consists of the whole of the northernmost rock exposure on the east side of Taylor Glacier, Mac. Robertson Land. It contains a colony of emperor penguins which is the larger of two known colonies of this species located entirely on land. The rookery is important because of long-term monitoring of the population of the penguins (since 1954).	Rec IV-1	67°26′00″S 60°50′00″E	0.26 km^{2} (0.10 sq mi)	Upload Photo
ASPA-102	Rookery Islands, Holme Bay, Mac. Robertson Land	The Rookery Islands are a group of small islands and rocks in the western part of Holme Bay, lying to the north of the Masson and David Ranges in Mac. Robertson Land, and about 10 km to the west of the Australian station Mawson. The area is a representative offshore island habitat with an unusual association of the breeding colonies of all six bird species resident in the Mawson area; two of which, the southern giant petrel and the Cape petrel occur nowhere else in the region.	Rec IV-2	67°36′36″S 62°32′06″E	1.67 km^{2} (0.64 sq mi)	Upload Photo
ASPA-103	Ardery Island and Odbert Island, Budd Coast, Wilkes Land	Ardery Island and Odbert Island are among the southernmost of the Windmill Islands, lying in the south of Vincennes Bay, off the Budd Coast of Wilkes Land, Eastern Antarctica. The site supports several breeding species of petrel and provides an example of their habitat. There is no other readily accessible place in eastern Antarctica where the four genera of fulmarine petrels breed in the same place in sufficient numbers to allow comparative study. Study of these four genera at one location is of high ecological importance in understanding and monitoring the Southern Ocean ecosystem. In addition both islands have breeding populations of Wilson's storm petrels and Antarctic skuas; and Odbert Island supports breeding populations of Adélie penguins.	Rec IV-3	66°23′06″S 110°29′50″E	2.44 km^{2} (0.94 sq mi)	Upload Photo
ASPA-104	Sabrina Island, Northern Ross Sea	The Balleny Islands are located around 325km north of the Pennell Coast, Northern Victoria Land. The ASPA comprises all of Sabrina Island above sea level, including the Monolith, and Chinstrap Islet. The area has outstanding environmental and scientific value. It is a representative sample of the Balleny Islands which is the only oceanic archipelago located within the main Antarctic Coastal Current. As such, they provide important resting and breeding habitat for seabird and seal species, and are significant in circumpolar distributions of a variety of species. Being isolated and prone to difficult weather and ice conditions, the Islands have had very little human disturbance.	Rec IV-4	66°55′00″S 163°19′00″E	1.5 km^{2} (0.58 sq mi)	Upload another image
ASPA-105	Beaufort Island, McMurdo Sound, Ross Sea	The area encompasses the whole of Beaufort Island above the mean high water mark, and includes the adjacent fast-ice occupied by breeding emperor penguins. The island contains substantial avifauna and it is one of the most important breeding areas in the region. It possesses a significant area of vegetation on an ice-cored moraine bench which is exceptional both in its quantity and quality, and is the most extensive, continuous area of mosses yet known for the McMurdo Sound region. It also represents one of the most southerly locations where red snow algae have been observed.	Rec IV-5	76°59′00″S 167°00′00″E	14.16 km^{2} (5.47 sq mi)	Upload another image
ASPA-106	Cape Hallett, Northern Victoria Land, Ross Sea	Cape Hallett is located at the southern end of Moubray Bay, Northern Victoria Land, in the western Ross Sea. The area contains a variety of habitats with plant communities that are the most extensive and representative examples known at the northern end of the latitudinal gradient of Victoria Land and the Ross Sea. South polar skuas and a large Adélie penguin colony also nest on the site. The history of human impact on the colony make this site unique and ideal for scientific study of impacts on, and recovery of, the colony following substantial ecosystem disturbance. The area also possesses outstanding aesthetic values with its combination of prolific biological resources. The history of human activity at the former station is also of interest to visitors.	Rec IV-7	72°19′00″S 170°16′00″E	0.53 km^{2} (0.20 sq mi)	Upload Photo
ASPA-107	Emperor Island, Dion Islands, Marguerite Bay, Antarctic Peninsula	The Dion Islands, a small archipelago comprising several islands, rocks and reefs, are situated 13.5 km south of the south-western extremity of Adelaide Island in Marguerite Bay. The site contains the only colony of emperor penguins known to exist on the west side of the Antarctic Peninsula, and the isolation of this colony from others of the same species makes it of outstanding scientific interest. It is also the most northerly and probably the smallest emperor penguin colony, and one of only two in which breeding occurs on land. Adélie penguins and blue-eyed shags also breed here.	Rec IV-8	67°52′00″S 68°42′00″W	4.67 km^{2} (1.80 sq mi)	Upload Photo
ASPA-108	Green Island, Berthelot Islands, Antarctic Peninsula	Green Island is a small island situated 150m north of the largest of the Berthelot Islands group in Grandidier Channel, approximately 3 km off the Graham Coast of the Antarctic Peninsula. The vegetation on the area is exceptionally rich, with well-developed continuous banks of moss turf and small patches of Antarctic hair grass. While the vegetation on Green Island is not as regionally diverse as once thought, in recent years it has largely escaped significant damage to its moss banks that more northerly islands have been subjected to by Antarctic fur seals. A large blue-eyed shag colony, brown skuas, south polar skuas and hybrids are also found. The colony of blue-eyed cormorants is possibly one of the largest along the Antarctic Peninsula.	Rec IV-9	65°19′00″S 64°09′00″W	0.17 km^{2} (0.066 sq mi)	Upload another image
ASPA-109	Moe Island, South Orkney Islands	Moe Island, South Orkney Islands, is a small irregularly shaped island lying 300m off the south-western extremity of Signy Island, from which it is separated by Fyr Channel. It provides a representative example of the maritime Antarctic ecosystem, including large banks of moss turf and colonies of chinstrap penguins, Cape petrels and Antarctic prions. Weddell seals and fur seals also haul out on the island's beaches. Moe Island is protected as a control area for future comparison with neighbouring Signy Island, which has been subjected to intensive scientific research and major changes in its low altitude terrestrial system due to disruption from fur seals. Additionally, Moe Island contains the greatest continuous expanses of Chorisodontium-Polytrichum moss turf found in Antarctica.	Rec IV-13	60°44′00″S 45°41′00″W	1.2 km^{2} (0.46 sq mi)	Upload Photo
ASPA-110	Lynch Island, South Orkney Islands	Lynch Island is a small island situated at the eastern end of Marshall Bay in the South Orkney Islands, about 200m south of Coronation Island and 2.4 km north of Signy Island. The area includes the whole island above the low tide water level, excluding offshore islets and rocks. The island supports one of the most extensive and dense stands of Antarctic hair grass known in the Antarctic Treaty Area; an outstanding example of a rare natural ecological system. Several species of moss are unusually fertile, and the soil contains a rich invertebrate fauna. Most species of Antarctic seals are common around the island. Despite localised damage from Antarctic fur seals, limited human disturbance via visitation, scientific research and sampling, means the area has potential value as a reference site to measure against comparable ecosystems which are experiencing substantial changes as a result of fur seal activities.	Rec IV-14	60°39′10″S 45°36′25″W	0.15 km^{2} (0.058 sq mi)	Upload Photo
ASPA-111	Southern Powell Island and adjacent islands, South Orkney Islands	The area includes all of Powell Island south of the latitude of the southern summit of John Peaks (375m altitude), together with the whole of Fredriksen Island, Michelsen Island, Christoffersen Island, Grey Island and unnamed adjacent islands. Southern Powell Island and the adjacent islands support flora and a considerable bird and mammal fauna representative of the natural ecology of the South Orkney Islands, which are rendered more important by the presence of a small, long-established breeding colony of fur seals.	Rec IV-15	60°42′00″S 45°01′00″W	23.56 km^{2} (9.10 sq mi)	Upload Photo
ASPA-112	Coppermine Peninsula, Robert Island, South Shetland Islands	Coppermine Peninsula is situated on the west side of Robert Island, which lies between Nelson Island to the east and Greenwich Island to the west, midway along the South Shetland Islands archipelago. It is a biologically diverse area, supporting rich vegetation, together with a variety of extra-terrestrial fauna and a rich avifauna. It has one of the largest continuous moss stands in the Antarctic. Chinstrap penguins, southern giant petrels, Wilson's storm petrels, Antarctic terns, Dominican gulls, elephant seals, Weddell seals and fur seals can also be found.	Rec VI-10	62°23′00″S 59°42′00″W	0.67 km^{2} (0.26 sq mi)	Upload another image
ASPA-113	Litchfield Island, Arthur Harbor, Anvers Island, Palmer Archipelago	Litchfield Island lies within Arthur Harbor, SW Anvers Island. Together with its littoral zone, it possesses an unusually high collection of marine and extra-terrestrial life, is unique amongst the neighboring islands as a breeding place for six species of native birds and provides an outstanding example of the natural ecological system of the Antarctic Peninsula area. In addition, Litchfield Island possesses rich growths of vegetation and has the most varied topography and the greatest diversity of terrestrial habitats of the islands in Arthur Harbor.	Rec VIII-1	64°46′00″S 64°06′00″W	0.36 km^{2} (0.14 sq mi)	Upload another image
ASPA-114	Northern Coronation Island, South Orkney Islands	The area includes the region of northern Coronation Island (the largest of the South Orkney Islands) between Conception Point to the west and Foul Point to the east. The site embraces areas of coastal ice-free terrain with large seabird colonies and lichen-dominated cliffs. Permanent ice rising to the Brisbane Heights plateau provides an excellent representative area of a pristine ice environment near the northern limit of the maritime Antarctic. The interrelated terrestrial, ice and marine components of the area comprise an integrated example of the coastal, permanent ice, and sublittoral ecosystems typical of the maritime Antarctic environment. he primary potential value of the area is as a reference site for use in comparative studies with more heavily impacted sites.	Rec XIII-10	60°33′00″S 45°35′00″W	91.76 km^{2} (35.43 sq mi)	Upload Photo
ASPA-115	Lagotellerie Island, Marguerite Bay, Graham Land	Lagotellerie Island is situated in Marguerite Bay, Fallières Coast, Graham Land, 46km SE of Rothera Point on Adelaide Island, 11 km south of Pourquoi Pas Island, and 3.25 km west of the south end of Horseshoe Island. The island contains relatively diverse flora and fauna typical of the southern Antarctic Peninsula. Of particular interest is the abundance of the only two Antarctic flowering plants, which form stands of up to 10m2, and are amongst the largest stands known south of the South Shetland Islands The shallow loamy soil developed beneath the plant swards and its associated invertebrate fauna and microbiota are probably unique at this latitude. There is also a colony of about 1000 pairs of Adélie penguins and one of the southernmost colonies of blue-eyed shags. Numerous pairs of brown and south polar skuas also breed on the island.	Rec XIII-11	67°53′00″S 67°24′00″W	1.62 km^{2} (0.63 sq mi)	Upload Photo
ASPA-116	New College Valley, Caughley Beach, Cape Bird, Ross Island	New College Valley is located south of Cape Bird on ice-free slopes above Caughley Beach, which lies between two Adélie penguin rookeries known as the Cape Bird Northern and Middle Rookeries. The area is the site of the most extensive and luxuriant stands of moss, algae, and lichens in southern Victoria Land; the terrestrial ecosystem within the site is the subject of long-term research. Because of the susceptibility of the cryptogamic vegetation to damage from trampling, designation of the area provides protection for its biota. The restricted zone is a conservation reserve with more stringent access conditions	Rec XIII-12	77°13′00″S 166°29′00″E	0.34 km^{2} (0.13 sq mi)	Upload Photo
ASPA-117	Avian Island, Marguerite Bay, Antarctic Peninsula	Avian Island is situated in north-western Marguerite Bay, 400m south of Adelaide Island, on the western side of the central Antarctic Peninsula. The site is of outstanding ornithological importance and unique in the Antarctic Peninsula region for its abundance and diversity, with six different seabirds breeding in such close proximity to each other. These include Adélie penguins, blue-eyed cormorants, southern giant petrels, kelp gulls, skuas, and Wilson's storm petrels. Several of these colonies are at the southernmost limits of their ranges, and are significant contributors to their total regional populations.	Rec XVI-4	67°46′00″S 68°54′00″W	1.12 km^{2} (0.43 sq mi)	Upload Photo
ASPA-118	Summit of Mount Melbourne, Victoria Land	Mount Melbourne is in northern Victoria Land on the western side of the Ross Sea. It is situated between Wood Bay and Terra Nova Bay, about 10km east of Campbell Glacier. The area exhibits high biodiversity relative to other geothermal sites in the Antarctic, both maritime and high altitude. The warmest areas of ground created by fumaroles support patches of moss, liverwort and algae along with one species of invertebrate protozoan. This includes the only known leafy example of the moss Campylopus pyriformis on the Antarctic continent, and the rare continental occurrence of the liverwort Cephaloziella varians. comparable to the two other known high altitude, geothermally influenced ice-free areas, near the summits of Mount Erebus and Mount Rittman.	Rec XIV-5	74°21′S 164°42′E	6.56 km^{2} (2.53 sq mi)	Upload another image
ASPA-119	Davis Valley and Forlidas Pond, Dufek Massif, Pensacola Mountains	Davis Valley and Forlidas Pond are situated in the north-eastern Dufek Massif of the Pensacola Mountains, part of the Transantarctic Mountain range. The area contains some of the most southerly freshwater ponds known in Antarctica, which are protected as examples of unique near pristine freshwater ecosystems and their catchments. They provide unique opportunities for the scientific study of biological communities near the extreme limit of the occurrence of these environments. The area is believed to be one of the most pristine ice-free valley systems in Antarctica, and is therefore considered to possess outstanding potential as a reference area for studies understanding the response of the Antarctic ice sheet to climate change.	Rec XVI-9	82°27′S 51°21′W	56.81 km^{2} (21.93 sq mi)	Upload Photo
ASPA-120	Pointe-Geologie Archipelago, Terre Adélie	The area comprises four islands: Jean Rostand, Le Mauguen, Lamarck and Claude Bernard; a nunatak, and a breeding ground for emperor penguins located in the heart of the Cape Geology Archipelago in the coastal area of Adélie Coast. It is a representative area of considerable biological, geological, and aesthetic value. It contains a high diversity of flora and fauna and is an important area for scientific research. Long-term research programmes on bird colonies, marine mammals and geology have been conducted in the area since 1952. Among the 30 or so emperor penguin breeding sites on record this is the only one located adjacent to a permanent station.	M 3 (1995)	66°40′00″S 140°02′00″E	0.37 km^{2} (0.14 sq mi)	Upload another image
ASPA-121	Cape Royds, Ross Island	Cape Royds is situated at the western extremity of Ross Island, McMurdo Sound, on a coastal strip of ice-free land. Approximately 8 km wide, on the lower western slopes of Mount Erebus. The area comprises both a terrestrial and marine component. The area supports the most southerly established Adélie penguin colony known. The site was specially protected to allow the penguin population to recover and protect on-going science programs. The colony remains of high scientific and ecological value and as such merits continued long-term special protection, especially in view of ongoing visits to Cape Royds from nearby stations and tourist groups.	Rec VIII-4	77°33′20″S 166°09′56″E	0.62 km^{2} (0.24 sq mi)	Upload Photo
ASPA-122	Arrival Heights, Hut Point Peninsula, Ross Island	Arrival Heights is a small range of low hills near the south-eastern end of Hut Point Peninsula, south-east Ross Island. Hut Point Peninsula is formed by a line of craters that extend south from the flanks of Mt. Erebus. The area is a natural and electromagnetically quiet site offering ideal conditions for the installation of sensitive instruments for recording data associated with upper atmosphere research programmes. Moreover, the original geographical characteristics of the site, such as its elevated position and thus broad viewing horizon, the volcanic crater morphology, and close proximity to the full logistic support of nearby McMurdo Station (US) (1.5 km south and Scott Base (NZ) 3km south-east), continue to render the area valuable for upper atmospheric studies and boundary layer air sampling studies.	Rec VIII-4	77°49′00″S 166°39′00″E	0.73 km^{2} (0.28 sq mi)	Upload another image
ASPA-123	Barwick and Balham Valleys, Southern Victoria Land	Barwick Valley is situated about 65km inland from the Ross Sea coast of southern Victoria Land. The area includes Barwick and Balham Valleys, and their respective catchments. The site is one of the least disturbed and contaminated of the dry valleys of Victoria Land, which are environmentally unique and possess extreme polar desert ecosystems. The site is important as a reference base to measure against changes in comparable ecosystems of the other dry valleys where scientific investigations are regularly conducted.	Rec VIII-4	77°20′00″S 161°00′00″E	418.14 km^{2} (161.44 sq mi)	Upload Photo
ASPA-124	Cape Crozier, Ross Island	Cape Crozier is at the eastern extremity of Ross Island, where an ice-free area comprises the lower eastern slopes of Mount Terror. The area is situated in the vicinity of Post Office Hill, extending to encompass the adjacent Ross Ice Shelf, where large cracks in the ice shelf are covered by fast-ice that is occupied annually by breeding emperor penguins. The area supports rich bird and mammal fauna as well as microfauna and microflora, and the ecosystem depends on a substantial mixing of marine and terrestrial elements of outstanding scientific interest. Protection is afforded to the long-term studies of the population dynamics and social behaviour of emperor and Adélie penguin colonies; as well as skua populations and vegetation assemblages.	Rec IV-6	77°30′30″S 169°21′30″E	72.21 km^{2} (27.88 sq mi)	Upload Photo
ASPA-125	Fildes Peninsula, King George Island (25 de Mayo)	The Fildes Peninsula is the most extensive coastal area free of snow in summer in King George Island (25 de Mayo), with a length of around 7km. It is one of the areas in Antarctica of greatest paleontological interest, owing to the presence of outcrops with fossil remains of a wide range of organisms, including vertebrate and invertebrate ichnites, and abundant flora with impressions of leaves and fronds, trunks, pollen grains and spores that date from the Late Cretaceous to the Eocene period.	Rec IV-12	62°12′00″S 58°58′00″W	2.34 km^{2} (0.90 sq mi)	Upload another image
ASPA-126	Byers Peninsula, Livingston Island, South Shetland Islands	Byers Peninsula is situated at the west end of Livingston Island. Designated to protect three smaller ice-free sites on the peninsula of Jurassic and Cretaceous sedimentary and fossiliferous strata, it is considered of outstanding scientific value for study of the former link between Antarctica and other southern continents. The area is also known for its considerable biological and archaeological importance, with coastal and inland lakes with particularly important biota. The inland lakes contain aquatic mosses and serve as breeding sites for the midge Parochlus steinenii, the only native winged insect in the Antarctic. The peninsula is also of exceptional historical interest, containing the greatest concentration of 19th century historical sites in Antarctica, such as the remains of refuges, contemporary artifacts, and shipwrecks of early nineteenth century sealing expeditions.	Rec IV-10	62°34′35″S 61°13′07″W	90.56 km^{2} (34.97 sq mi)	Upload another image
ASPA-127	Haswell Island	The area is defined by a polygon which comprises Haswell Island (the largest island in the archipelago), its littoral zone, and the adjacent section of fast ice in the Davis Sea. The site is a unique and exceptionally important breeding site for almost all breeding bird species in East Antarctica, including five species of petrel, one species of skua, and one species of penguin. The area also supports five species of pinnipeds, including the Ross seal which is a Specially Protected Species. It has one of a few emperor penguin colonies in the vicinity of a permanent Antarctic station, providing advantages for the study of the species and its habitat	Rec VIII-4	66°31′00″S 93°00′00″E	5.01 km^{2} (1.93 sq mi)	Upload Photo
ASPA-128	Western shore of Admiralty Bay, King George Island, South Shetland Islands	The area supports an exceptional assemblage of Antarctic birds and mammals close to Arctowski Station (Poland), which is frequently visited by tourist ships. An important aim of the area is to protect long-term research programmes, conducted on the site since 1976, from accidental disturbance, especially during the breeding season.	Rec X-5	62°11′00″S 58°27′00″W	18.04 km^{2} (6.97 sq mi)	Upload Photo
ASPA-129	Rothera Point, Adelaide Island	Rothera Point is situated in Ryder Bay, at the south-east corner of Wright Peninsula on the east side of Adelaide Island, south-west Antarctic Peninsula. The site serves as a biological research site and control area, against which the effects of human impact associated with the adjacent Rothera Research Station (UK) can be monitored in an Antarctic fellfield ecosystem. The area itself has little intrinsic nature conservation value. South polar skuas and kelp gulls nest at the site.	Rec XIII-8	67°34′00″S 68°06′00″W	0.04 km^{2} (0.015 sq mi)	Upload Photo
ASPA-130	'Tramway Ridge', Mount Erebus, Ross Island	The area is a square of 200 m by 200.8 m, encompassing most of the warm ground area of lower Tramway Ridge. The area is divided into two parts of almost equal size, the northern half being a prohibited zone. Mount Erebus provides one of only three known high-altitude areas of fumarolic activity and associated vegetation in the Antarctic. The warm ground and its vegetation are of interest to botanists, physiologists and microbiologists, and serve as a reference site for ecological research. The area has significant gas emission and its soil has the highest surface temperatures on Mt Erebus, making it also of interest to volcanologists. The regional uniqueness of the communities is of substantial scientific interest and value.	Rec XIII-8	77°31′00″S 167°07′00″E	0.04 km^{2} (0.015 sq mi)	Upload Photo
ASPA-131	Canada Glacier, Lake Fryxell, Taylor Valley, Victoria Land	The area is situated in the Taylor Valley in the southern Victoria Land Dry Valleys. It encompasses most of the glacier forefeild area on the east side of the lower Canada Glacier, and includes the sloping ice-free ground with summer ponds and small meltwater streams draining from the Canada Glacier to Lake Fryxell. It contains some of the richest plant growth (algae and mosses) in the southern Victoria Land Dry Valleys and is valuable as a reference site for other dry valley ecosystems. The concentration of research activity within the area makes it necessary to regulate human impact in respect of trampling, water quality and sampling.	Rec XIII-8	77°37′00″S 163°03′00″E	1.51 km^{2} (0.58 sq mi)	Upload another image
ASPA-132	Potter Peninsula, King George Island, (Isla 25 de Mayo), South Shetland Islands	This area is located on the east coast of Maxwell Bay, south-west of King George Island, between the southern tip of Mirounga Point (North-west of Potter Peninsula) and the outcrop known as "Spur 7" on the north-eastern border of Stranger Point. It hosts important bird colonies, marine mammal breeding areas and diverse vegetal species. It is close to the Argentine Jubany Base. Long-term research programmes on the breeding ecology of elephant seals and birds (carried out in the area since 1982) could be endangered by accidental disturbance, especially during breeding periods.	Rec XIII-8	62°15′S 58°39′W	2.17 km^{2} (0.84 sq mi)	Upload Photo
ASPA-133	Harmony Point, Nelson Island, South Shetland Islands	This area is located on the west coast of Nelson Island, between King George Island to the north-east and Robert Island to the south-west. It includes Harmony Point, the Toe, the adjacent ice and the surrounding marine zone. It is an area rich in avian species, with large breeding colonies of eleven seabird species, including one of the largest single colonies of chinstrap penguins in Antarctica. Vegetation cover is extensive and comprises a rich flora including mosses, lichen, and species of flowering plants.	Rec XIII-8	62°18′00″S 59°11′00″W	30.69 km^{2} (11.85 sq mi)	Upload Photo
ASPA-134	Cierva Point and offshore islands, Danco Coast, Antarctic Peninsula	Cierva Point is located on the south coast of Cierva Cove, to the north of Hughes Bay, between the Danco and Palmer Coasts, in the north-western portion of the Antarctic Peninsula. The site sustains important avian populations, extensive vegetation and a diverse flora including the two Antarctic flowering plants, several liverworts and invertebrate fauna. The unique topography of the area together with the abundance and diversity of the vegetation create highly favourable conditions for the formation of numerous microhabitats which, in turn, support the development of biodiversity and give the area exceptional aesthetic value.	Rec XIII-8	64°10′00″S 61°01′00″W	59.03 km^{2} (22.79 sq mi)	Upload Photo
ASPA-135	North-East Bailey Peninsula, Budd Coast, Wilkes Land	The area is located on Bailey Peninsula in the Windmill Islands region of Budd Coast, Wilkes Land, East Antarctica. The site contains contrasting habitats and water bodies, extremely rich lichen and moss communities, and an important stand of liverwort. Proximity to the nearby Casey Station (Australia) minimizes logistical problems for field research and, at the same time, maximizes the potential for disturbance of research in the area (including studies into the diverse assemblage of vegetation since the early 1980s). It is primarily for the latter reason that the site requires protection.	Rec XIII-8	66°17′00″S 110°33′00″E	0.28 km^{2} (0.11 sq mi)	Upload Photo
ASPA-136	Clark Peninsula, Budd Coast, Wilkes Land	Clark Peninsula is an area of rock exposures, permanent ice and snow fields, situated on the north side of Newcomb Bay at the east end of Vincennes Bay on Budd Coast, Wilkes Land. It provides a unique and visible time sequence of the emergence of the area of the Windmill Islands from the sea since the Holocene deglaciation. Scientific research within the area has focused on plant communities and long term population studies of Adélie penguin colonies. The protection of this flora and fauna allows for valuable comparison with similar plant communities and penguin colonies closer to Casey Station, which are subject to greater levels of human disturbance.	Rec XIII-8	66°15′S 110°36′E	9.38 km^{2} (3.62 sq mi)	Upload Photo
ASPA-137	North-West White Island, McMurdo Sound	White Island, part of the McMurdo volcanic complex, is situated approximately 20km south-east of the edge of the McMurdo Ice Shelf and 25 km south-east of Hut Point, the location of McMurdo Station (US) and Scott Base (NZ) on Ross Island. This locality contains an unusual breeding population of Weddell seals which has been physically isolated from other populations by the advance of the McMurdo Ice Shelf and Ross Ice Shelf. It is one of the very few areas where Weddell seals feed under an ice shelf. It is also one of the most southerly Weddell seal populations and has been studied year-round. The population is considered to have exceptional scientific value because of its period of physical isolation from interaction with other seals, thought to be around 60 years. Investigations are being undertaken of the extent to which the group may be considered a genetically distinct population.	Rec XIII-8	78°07′00″S 167°11′00″E	141.61 km^{2} (54.68 sq mi)	Upload Photo
ASPA-138	Linnaeus Terrace, Asgard Range, Victoria Land	Linnaeus Terrace is a bench of weathered Beacon Sandstone approximately 1.5 km in length and 1km in width at an elevation of about 1600 m, located at the western end of the Asgard Range, 1.5 km north of Oliver Peak. The site is one of the richest localities for the unique cryptoendolithic communities which colonize the Beacon Sandstone. The sandstones exhibit a range of biological and physical weathering forms, as well as trace fossils, and many of the formations are fragile and vulnerable to disturbance and destruction by trampling and sampling.	Rec XIII-8	77°35′00″S 161°05′00″E	0.78 km^{2} (0.30 sq mi)	Upload Photo
ASPA-139	Biscoe Point, Anvers Island, Palmer Archipelago	Biscoe Point is at the western extremity of a small island located close to the southern coast of Anvers Island, in the region west of the Antarctic Peninsula known as the Palmer Archipelago. The site contains a large but discontinuous stand of the two native vascular plants of Antarctica, Antarctic hair grass and Antarctic pearlwort. A relatively well developed loam occurs beneath the closed swards of the grass, and contains rich biota including the apterous midge Belgica Antarctica. It has not yet been substantially damaged by Antarctic fur seals, so the area is a potential control site for assessing Antarctic fur seal impacts on vegetation and soils in this region. It is also valuable for ornithological research. Long-term studies are being conducted on both Adélie and gentoo penguin colonies present within the area, which could be jeopardised by interference from nearby Palmer Station and from tourist ships.	Rec XIII-8	64°48′00″S 63°47′00″W	0.6 km^{2} (0.23 sq mi)	Upload Photo
ASPA-140	Parts of Deception Island, South Shetland Islands	Deception Island is an active volcano located in the South Shetland Islands The area comprises 11 sub-sites, lettered A to L (but excluding I), in a clockwise direction from the south-west of the Deception Island caldera, and referred to by the most prominent named geographical feature associated with each site. Due to major volcanic eruptions in 1967, 1969 and 1970, the island offers unique opportunities to study colonization processes in Antarctic environments. The flora of the island is unique in Antarctic terms, particularly where associated with these geothermal areas, but also because of the recently formed surfaces which provide known-age habitats for the study of colonization and other dynamic ecological processes by terrestrial organisms.	Rec XIII-8	62°57′00″S 60°38′00″W	2.57 km^{2} (0.99 sq mi)	Upload Photo
ASPA-141	Yukidori Valley, Langhovde, Lützow-Holm Bay	Yukidori Valley is situated in the middle part of Langhovde, on the east coast of Lützow-Holm Bay, Continental Antarctica. The area is representative of the typical Antarctic fellfield ecosystem. Permanent quadrats for monitoring lichen and moss vegetation have been established in this typical continental ecosystem to investigate long-term environmental change. Considering the increasing pedestrian traffic from the nearby Syowa Station (Japan) the aim is to keep human impacts on the ecosystem to a minimum and protect scientific research.	Rec XIV-5	69°14′30″S 39°46′00″E	4.88 km^{2} (1.88 sq mi)	Upload Photo
ASPA-142	Svarthamaren	The area consists of the ice free areas of the Svarthmaren nunatak, as part of the Mühlig-Hoffmanfjella in Dronning Maud Land, and the nunatak's surrounding rocks and boulders. It holds the largest known inland seabird colony in Antarctica, with snow petrel, south polar skua, and the largest proportion of the known world population of Antarctic petrel. The colony is an exceptional "natural research laboratory" providing for research on these seabirds, and their adaptation to breeding in the inland/interior of Antarctica.	Rec XIV-5	71°54′40″S 5°11′00″E	6.49 km^{2} (2.51 sq mi)	Upload another image
ASPA-143	Marine Plain, Mule Peninsula, Vestfold Hills, Princess Elizabeth Land	Marine Plain lies approximately 10km south-east of Davis Station in the Vestfold Hills. The area possesses unique vertebrate fossil fauna and is of exceptional ongoing scientific interest because of its relevance to the palaeocological and palaeoclimatic record of Antarctica. The area has been subject to several detailed geological, palaeontological, geomorphologic and glaciological studies. Burton Lake, a hypersaline lagoon in seasonal connection with the marine environment to the west of the site, represents a unique stage in the biological and physico-chemical evolution of a terrestrial water body from the marine environment.	Rec XIV-5	68°37′50″S 78°07′55″E	20.46 km^{2} (7.90 sq mi)	Upload Photo
ASPA-144	'Chile Bay' (Discovery Bay), Greenwich Island, South Shetland Islands	The area comprises two small areas of benthic habitat in Chile Bay. It has been the location of continuous benthic research since 1967, following the volcanic eruption on Deception island. Data being accumulated provides a baseline for long-term scientific investigations.	Rec XIV-5	62°29′06″S 59°41′27″W	0.66 km^{2} (0.25 sq mi)	Upload Photo
ASPA-145	Port Foster, Deception Island, South Shetland Islands	The area comprises two sub-areas in Port Foster, Deception Island: benthic habitat A, with depths of between 50 and 150m; and benthic habitat B, between 100 and 150 m deep. The area is of exceptional ecological interest because of its active volcanic character. It also has a diversity of benthic fauna on two different kinds of sea bottom substrates. These two habitat areas are subject to long-term research on the ecological process of recolonisation after volcanic eruption, and it is necessary to reduce the risk of accidental interference which could jeopardize these studies.	Rec XIV-5	62°55′51″S 60°37′30″W	2.24 km^{2} (0.86 sq mi)	Upload another image
ASPA-146	South Bay, Doumer Island, Palmer Archipelago	Doumer Island lies at the south-west entrance to the Neumayer Channel. It is separated from Wiencke Island by the Peltier Channel. South Bay lies on the south coast of Doumer Island. The site consists of a small area of coastal and subtidal benthos down to 45 m depth. It is the subject of a long-term study on marine ecology, focused on the study of the relationships between the marine organisms in the area.	Rec XIV-5	64°52′00″S 63°35′00″W	0.96 km^{2} (0.37 sq mi)	Upload Photo
ASPA-147	Ablation Valley And Ganymede Heights, Alexander Island	Ablation Valley – Ganymede Heights is situated on the east side of Alexander Island, the largest island off the western coast of Palmer Land, Antarctic Peninsula. The site is one of the largest ice-free ablation areas in West Antarctica, making it an area of outstanding scientific interest. The site contains the only known area of unbroken exposure of rocks spanning the Jurassic – Cretaceous boundary in the Antarctic. There is also an exceptional and unique contiguous geomorphologic record of glacier and ice-shelf fluctuations extending over several thousand years, together with an outstanding assemblage of other geomorphologic features. Two perennially frozen freshwater lakes, which have the unusual property of contact with the saline waters of George VI Sound, are also a site for research activity. The area also has the greatest bryophyte diversity of any site at this latitude in Antarctica.	Rec XV-6	70°50′00″S 68°30′00″W	109.02 km^{2} (42.09 sq mi)	Upload Photo
ASPA-148	Mount Flora, Hope Bay, Antarctic Peninsula	Mount Flora is situated on the south-eastern flank of Hope Bay, on the Antarctic Peninsula. The area contains rich fossil flora, which was among the first fossil floras discovered in Antarctica. It has played a significant stratigraphic role in deducing the geological history of the Antarctic Peninsula. The area requires protection because of its long history as a geological research site, and its easy accessibility makes it vulnerable to souvenir collectors.	Rec XV-6	63°25′00″S 57°01′00″W	0.35 km^{2} (0.14 sq mi)	Upload Photo
ASPA-149	Cape Shirreff and San Telmo Island, Livingston Island, South Shetland Islands	Cape Shirreff is situated on the northern coast of Livingston Island, between Barclay Bay and Hero Bay. The Antarctic fur seal and penguin breeding colonies and krill fisheries within the foraging range of these species make this a critical site for ecosystem monitoring. A survey of the South Shetland Islands and the Antarctic Peninsula identified Cape Shirreff – San Telmo Island as the most suitable site to monitor Antarctic fur seal colonies that could be affected by fisheries around the South Shetland Islands. The fur seal colony itself is the largest in the Antarctic Peninsula region, and has undergone monitoring since 1965, making it one of the longest continuous Antarctic fur seal monitoring programmes.	Rec IV-11	62°27′30″S 60°47′17″W	9.74 km^{2} (3.76 sq mi)	Upload another image
ASPA-150	Ardley Island, Maxwell Bay, King George Island (25 de Mayo)	The area comprises most of the island, and is linked to King George Island (25 de Mayo) by an isthmus that remains submerged at high tide. The eastern part of the isthmus, that remains dry during high tide, is included in the area as it is part of the island. The island was designated as a protected area on account of the diverse assemblage of bird species that breed on it, and to allow a study of their ecology and the factors that affect their populations. It also possesses a developed and outstanding flora, with several species of lichens, mosses and vascular plants.	Rec XVI-2	62°13′00″S 58°54′00″W	1.22 km^{2} (0.47 sq mi)	Upload another image
ASPA-151	Lions Rump, King George Island, South Shetland Islands	Lions Rump is located on the southern coast of King George Bay, King George Island. The area is representative of the terrestrial, limnological and littoral habitats of the maritime Antarctic. There is rich lichen flora, and two native flowering plants. Twelve species of birds, including colonies of Adélie, chinstrap and gentoo penguins, nest within the area. There are large numbers of elephant seals and fur seals on the beaches. The area has had minimal disturbance from human activity, except for occasional monitoring studies of the mammal and bird populations, geological and geomorphologic studies, and should be protected against damaging activities.	Rec XVI-2	62°08′00″S 58°07′00″W	1.32 km^{2} (0.51 sq mi)	Upload another image
ASPA-152	Western Bransfield Strait	This marine ASPA lies off the western and southern coasts of Low Island, South Shetland Islands. The shallow shelf south of Low Island is one of only two known sites in the vicinity of Palmer Station that are suitable for bottom trawling for fish and other benthic organisms. From an ecological standpoint, the Low Island site offers unique opportunities to study the composition, structure, and dynamics of several accessible marine communities. The Site, and in particular, its benthic fauna, is of exceptional scientific interest and requires long-term protection from potential harmful interference.	Rec XVI-3	63°23′00″S 62°21′00″W	915.8 km^{2} (353.6 sq mi)	Upload Photo
ASPA-153	Eastern Dallmann Bay	This marine ASPA lies off the western and northern coasts of Brabant Island, Palmer Archipelago, situated 65 km west of the Antarctic Peninsula, between Brabant and Anvers Islands, with Bransfield Strait to the north and Gerlache Strait to the south. It is one of only two known sites near Palmer Station that are suitable for bottom trawling for fish and other benthic organisms. The Site and, in particular, its benthic fauna, are of exceptional scientific interest and require long-term protection from harmful interference.	Rec XVI-3	64°10′00″S 62°50′00″W	609.54 km^{2} (235.34 sq mi)	Upload Photo
ASPA-154	Botany Bay, Cape Geology, Victoria Land	Cape Geology is situated in the south-western corner of Granite Harbour, southern Victoria Land, approximately 100 km north-west of Ross Island. The site is an extremely rich botanical refuge for such a high latitude location, with a lichen and moss species diversity and abundance that is unique for Southern Victoria Land. There are also abundant growths of algae, large populations of invertebrates and a colony of south polar skua. The area also contains a managed zone, which contains the remains of a rock shelter and associated artefacts of historical importance from the 1910-1913 British Antarctic Expedition.	M 3 (1997)	77°00′30″S 162°34′00″E	2.14 km^{2} (0.83 sq mi)	Upload Photo
ASPA-155	Cape Evans, Ross Island	Cape Evans is a small, triangular shaped, ice-free area in the south west of Ross Island, 10km to the south of Cape Royds and 22 km to the north of Hut Point Peninsula on Ross Island. The site is one of the principal sites of the Heroic Age of Antarctic exploration; it contains historic structures and relics pertaining to this era. Some of the earliest advances in Antarctic science are associated with the R.F. Scott Terra Nova Expedition, and as such, the site has considerable historical, cultural and scientific significance. It was subsequently used as a base by the Ross Sea party of Sir Ernest Shackleton's Imperial Trans-Antarctic Expedition of 1914-1917. The site includes Terra Nova hut and numerous artefacts that are distributed around the site.	M 2 (1997)	77°38′00″S 166°24′00″E	0.06 km^{2} (0.023 sq mi)	Upload another image
ASPA-156	Lewis Bay, Mount Erebus, Ross Island	The area was the site of an Air New Zealand aircraft crash on 28 November 1979 into the northern slope of Mount Erebus. The designated area encompasses the crash zone and the surrounding glacial ice 2 km above and to either side of this position. All two hundred and fifty seven people on board the aircraft lost their lives in the tragedy. The site of the tragedy was originally designated a tomb to be "left in peace". The stainless steel cross memorial, approximately 3 km from the site, is not part of the ASPA, but is Historic Monument 73. The area is to be kept protected as a mark of respect, in remembrance of the victims of the tragedy and to protect the site's emotional values.	M 2 (1997)	77°25′29″S 167°28′30″E	14.41 km^{2} (5.56 sq mi)	Upload Photo
ASPA-157	Backdoor Bay, Cape Royds, Ross Island	Cape Royds is an ice free area at the western extremity of Ross Island, approximately 40km to the south of Cape Bird and 35 km to the north of Hut Point Peninsula on Ross Island. The area is one of the principal sites of the Heroic Age of Antarctic exploration and it contains historic structures and relics pertaining to this era. Some of the earliest advances in the study of earth sciences, meteorology, flora and fauna in Antarctica are associated with the 1907-1909 British Antarctic (Nimrod) Expedition which was based at this site. The hut was also used again by the Ross Sea Party of the Imperial Trans-Antarctic Expedition of 1914-1917. As such, the site has high historical, cultural and scientific significance. Numerous additional artifacts are distributed around the area.	M 1 (1998)	77°33′10″S 166°10′06″E	0.04 km^{2} (0.015 sq mi)	Upload Photo
ASPA-158	Hut Point, Ross Island	Hut Point is a small ice free area protruding south west from the Hut Point Peninsula and situated to the west of the United States McMurdo Station. The designated area consists solely of the structure of the hut which is situated near the south western extremity of Hut Point. The hut is one of the principal sites of the Heroic Age of Antarctic exploration, being built during the National Antarctic (Discovery) Expedition in 1901-1904, and used again by other expeditions in 1907-1909, 1910-1913, and 1914-1917. Consequently, the site contains historic structures and relics pertaining to this era, with some of the earliest advances in Antarctic science are associated with the Discovery Expedition.	M 1 (1998)	77°50′50″S 166°38′00″E	N/A	Upload Photo
ASPA-159	Cape Adare, Borchgrevink Coast	Cape Adare is a generally ice free, prominent volcanic headland, at the northern extremity of Victoria Land. The area is located to the south west of the Cape on the southern shore of Ridley Beach. The area is an important symbol of the Heroic Age of Antarctic exploration and, as such, has considerable historical and cultural significance. Some of the earliest advances in Antarctic science are associated with the two earliest expeditions based at this site. There are three main structures in the area. Two were built in February 1899 by the British Antarctic Expedition led by Borchgrevink (1898-1900), and used for the first winter spent on the Antarctic continent. In 1911 Scott's British Antarctic Expedition (1910-13) Northern Party wintered at the third hut, situated 30m to the north of Borchgrevink's hut and built in February 1911. There are also numerous associated historical relics located in the area.	M 1 (1998)	71°18′S 170°09′E	0.03 km^{2} (0.012 sq mi)	Upload another image
ASPA-160	Frazier Islands, Windmill Islands, Wilkes Land, East Antarctica	The Frazier Islands are three islands located in the eastern part of Vincennes Bay, approximately 16km to the west-north-west of Casey Station (Australia). The islands are one of only four known breeding colonies of southern giant petrels around the coastline of continental Antarctica, and it is the only breeding site in nearly 3000 km of coastline between Davis Station (Australia) and Dumont d’Urville (France). The site has been visited infrequently, typically only for seabird observations, and provides a reference area for future comparative studies with other breeding populations of southern giant petrels.	M 2 (2003)	66°14′00″S 110°10′00″E	0.6 km^{2} (0.23 sq mi)	Upload Photo
ASPA-161	Terra Nova Bay, Ross Sea	The area is situated in Terra Nova Bay, between the Campbell Glacier Tongue and Drygalski Ice Tongue, Victoria Land. The region contains an important littoral area for well-established and long-term scientific investigations, with a high diversity at both species and community levels. The sponge and anthozoan communities at Terra Nova Bay showing a unique structure, and the region is particularly vulnerable to disturbance by pollution, over-sampling and alien introductions. Extensive marine ecological research has been carried out at Terra Nova Bay since 1986/1987, revealing a high diversity at both the species and community levels, with the sponge and anthozoan communities at Terra Nova Bay showing a unique structure. The area is vulnerable to disturbance by pollution, over-sampling and alien introductions, and requires protection against direct human impacts.	M 2 (2003)	74°45′00″S 164°10′00″E	29.46 km^{2} (11.37 sq mi)	Upload Photo
ASPA-162	Mawson's Huts, Cape Denison, Commonwealth Bay, George V Land, East Antarctica	Cape Denison is a 1.5 km-wide peninsula projecting into the centre of Commonwealth Bay, a 60km-wide stretch of coast in George V Land, East Antarctica. At the seaward end of this valley is Boat Harbour, a 400m long indentation in the coast. Mawson's Main Hut is located about 65m from the harbor. This ASPA covers four sites, each consisting of one hut and extending 5m from the perimeter of the hut. The area includes the Main Hut, the Transit Hut, the Absolute Magnetic Hut, and the Magnetograph House. The area is to protect the historical, archaeological, technical, social and aesthetic values of Mawson's Huts, which served as the base for the Australasian Antarctic Expedition of 1911-1914, organised and led by geologist Dr Douglas Mawson. It is an important symbol for the ‘Historic Era’ of Antarctic Exploration.	M 2 (2004)	67°00′30″S 142°39′40″E	N/A	Upload another image
ASPA-163	Dakshin Gangotri Glacier, Dronning Maud Land	Dakshin Gangotri Glacier is a small tongue of polar continental ice sheet, overriding the Schirmacher Oasis of central Dronning Maud Land.The site contains a small tongue of polar continental ice sheet, The glacier was identified by the second Indian Antarctic Expedition in 1983, and since then its snout has been monitored continuously. With the availability of this vast amount of data for the past two decades, it has become a valuable site for observing the changes in the movement of the Antarctic ice sheet under the impact of global warming. The area has primary scientific importance for glaciologists and environmental scientists.	M 2 (2005)	70°45′15″S 11°38′30″E	4.31 km^{2} (1.66 sq mi)	Upload Photo
ASPA-164	Scullin and Murray Monoliths, Mac Robertson Land	Scullin Monolith and Murray Monolith are situated on the coast of Mac. Robertson Land approximately 160km east of Mawson Station (Australia). The area holds the greatest concentration of breeding seabird colonies in East Antarctica, and is rich in species diversity. Including. It is also the second largest colony for at least 160,000 pairs of Antarctic petrels, from a minimum estimated global total of approximately half a million pairs. Adélie penguin colonies also occupy the lower slopes of both monoliths, extending almost to the foreshore. The area possesses outstanding aesthetic values in the geomorphology of the two Monoliths and the spectacular nature of the glaciers descending from the Continental plateau that flow around the Monoliths ending in calving glaciers.	M 2 (2005)	67°48′07″S 66°43′06″E	10.23 km^{2} (3.95 sq mi)	Upload Photo
ASPA-165	Edmonson Point, Wood Bay, Ross Sea	Edmonson Point is a coastal ice-free area of 1.79 km^{2} situated at Wood Bay, 50km north of Terra Nova Bay, and at the foot of Mount Melbourne (2732m), 13 km east of the summit, in Victoria Land. The terrestrial and freshwater ecosystem is one of the most outstanding in northern Victoria Land. An exceptional diversity of freshwater habitats is present, with numerous streams, lakes, ponds and seepage areas, exhibiting nutrient conditions ranging from eutrophic to oligotrophic. The nature and diversity of the terrestrial and freshwater habitats offer outstanding scientific opportunities, This area is considered one of the best sites in Antarctica for studies of algal ecology. The scientific value of Edmonson Point is also considered exceptional for studies on the impact of climate change on terrestrial ecosystems.	M 1 (2006)	74°20′00″S 165°08′00″E	5.5 km^{2} (2.1 sq mi)	Upload Photo
ASPA-166	Port Martin, Adélie Land	The area is centered on a point which corresponds to the marker known as the "Astrolabe pillar", located on the left hand side of the "refuge shelter" at Port Martin, Terre-Adélie. The site contains the remains of the main building (destroyed by fire in 1952) and several annexes build by members of successive French Antarctic expeditions between 1948 and 1952. Since then, only limited visits of a few hours have occurred, and with its short duration of operation, the remains of Port-Martin base are a perfect illustration of a base in Antarctica in the immediate post-war period. For future archaeology, the site represents an optimal site to design methods and techniques adapted to extreme archaeological investigation conditions. It is considered not only as a historical bridge site, but also as an original archaeological field.	M 1 (2006)	66°49′00″S 141°23′00″E	0.17 km^{2} (0.066 sq mi)	Upload Photo
ASPA-167	Hawker Island, Vestfold Hills, Ingrid Christensen Coast, Princess Elizabeth Land, East Antarctica	Hawker Island is located approximately 300m offshore from the Vestfold Hills, which is a roughly triangular ice-free area of approximately 512 km^{2} of bedrock, glacial debris, lakes and ponds. The area supports the southernmost breeding colony of southern giant petrels on continental Antarctica, alongside of Adélie penguins and a limited number of flying birds. The breeding population of southern giant petrels at the island decreased following its discovery in 1963, and human disturbance has been implicated in the observed decreases at all four southern giant petrel breeding sites on continental Antarctica. As an ASPA it completes the effort to safeguard all known southern giant petrel breeding locations in East Antarctica.	M 1 (2006)	68°35′00″S 77°50′00″E	2.17 km^{2} (0.84 sq mi)	Upload Photo
ASPA-168	Mount Harding, Grove Mountains, East Antarctica	The Grove Mountains are located approximately 400km inland (south) of the Larsemann Hills in Princess Elizabeth Land, East Antarctica. The area includes the open blue-ice zone from the moraine on the west side of Mount Harding to the east side of the Zakharoff Ridge; as well as a number of nunataks, a detritus zone and a moraine within it. The primary reason for designation of the site is to protect the unique geomorphologic features of the area for scientific research on the evolutionary history of East Antarctic Ice Sheet (EAIS). The remains of the fluctuation of ice sheet surface preserved around Mount Harding will most probably provide the precious direct evidences for reconstructing the EAIS behaviour. The site contains glacial erosion and wind-erosion physiognomies which are rare in nature and extremely vulnerable, such as the ice-core pyramid and the ventifact. These glacial-geological features have not only important scientific values, but also have rare wildness and aesthetic values.	M 2 (2008)	72°54′00″S 75°02′30″E	102.78 km^{2} (39.68 sq mi)	Upload Photo
ASPA-169	Amanda Bay, Ingrid Christensen Coast, Princess Elizabeth Land, East Antarctica	Amanda Bay is located on the Ingrid Christensen Coast of Princess Elizabeth Land, East Antarctica. The area was designated to protect the breeding colony of several thousand pairs of emperor penguins annually resident in the south-west corner of Amanda Bay, while providing for continued collection of valuable long-term research and monitoring data and comparative studies with colonies elsewhere in East Antarctica. The accessibility of Amanda Bay is advantageous for research purposes, but also creates the potential for human disturbance of the birds.	M 3 (2008)	69°15′00″S 76°49′59″E	17.15 km^{2} (6.62 sq mi)	Upload Photo
ASPA-170	Marion Nunataks, Charcot Island, Antarctic Peninsula	Charcot Island is roughly circular in shape, approximately 50km across and is separated from north-west Alexander Island by Wilkins Sound and Wilkins Ice shelf. It is ice-covered with the exception of Marion Nunataks, which form a 12 km chain of rock outcrops that overlook the mid-north coast of Charcot Island. The area was designated to protect its outstanding environmental values and to facilitate ongoing and planned scientific research. The nunataks have several unique characteristics including two lichens species that have not been recorded elsewhere in Antarctica, mosses that are rarely found at such southerly latitudes and, perhaps most significantly off all, a complete lack of predatory arthropods and Collembola which are common at all other equivalent sites within the biogeographical zone.	M 4 (2008)	69°45′S 75°15′W	179.55 km^{2} (69.32 sq mi)	Upload Photo
ASPA-171	Narebski Point, Barton Peninsula, King George Island	Narebski Point is located on the southeast coast of Barton Peninsula, King George Island. The area is rich in flora and fauna, of which the abundance of some species is exceptional. The cover of mosses and lichens is very extensive. There are large numbers of chinstrap and gentoo penguins and the breeding areas of seven other birds including the nests of the southern giant petrel. The high diversity in relief and coastal forms, due to the presence of different geologies and a prominent system of fractures, in addition to an extensive and varied vegetation cover, provides unusual scenic diversity in the Antarctic environment.	M 13 (2009)	62°14′03″S 58°46′05″W	0.89 km^{2} (0.34 sq mi)	Upload Photo
ASPA-172	Lower Taylor Glacier and Blood Falls, Taylor Valley, McMurdo Dry Valleys, Victoria Land	Blood Falls is an iron-rich saline discharge located at the terminus of the Taylor Glacier, Taylor Valley, McMurdo Dry Valleys. The source of the discharge is believed to be a subglacial marine salt deposit and brine reservoir located beneath the ablation zone of the Taylor Glacier, estimated to be located between one and six kilometres above Blood Falls. The primary reasons for designation of the area are its unique physical properties, and the unusual microbial ecology and geochemistry. The area is an important site for exobiological studies and provides a unique opportunity to sample the subglacial environment without direct contact. The influence of Blood Falls on adjacent Lake Bonney is also of significant scientific interest. Furthermore, the ablation zone of the Taylor Glacier is an important site for paleoclimatic and glaciological research. The lower Taylor Glacier subglacial brine reservoir and Blood Falls are globally unique and a site of outstanding scientific importance.	M 9 (2012)	77°50′13″S 161°40′14″E	436 km^{2} (168 sq mi)	Upload another image

== See also ==
- Antarctic Specially Managed Area
