= January 1916 =

Month in 1916

<<	January 1916					>>
Su	Mo	Tu	We	Th	Fr	Sa
						1
2	3	4	5	6	7	8
9	10	11	12	13	14	15
16	17	18	19	20	21	22
23	24	25	26	27	28	29
30	31

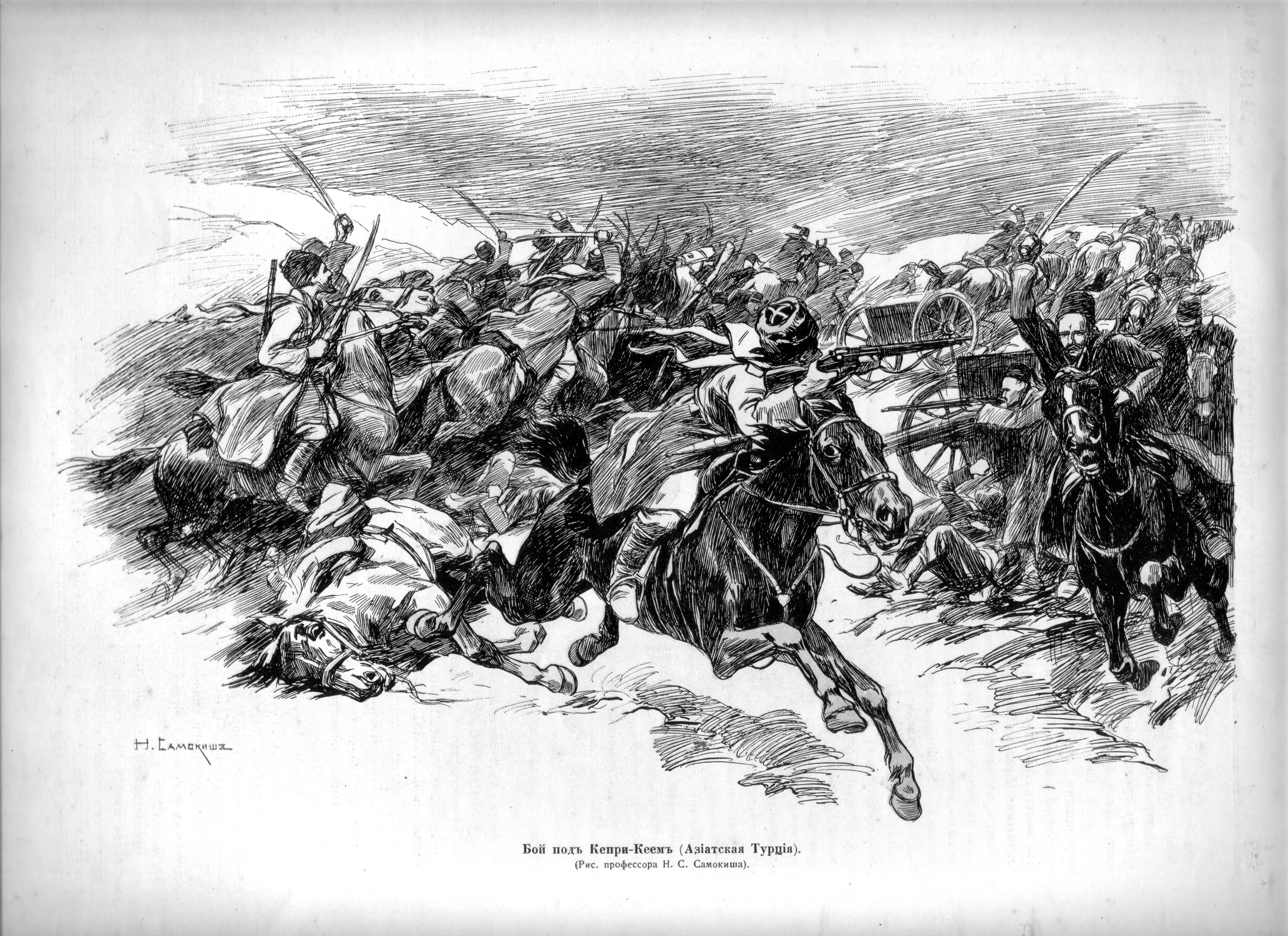
Russian and Ottoman cavalry clash at the Battle of Koprukoy near Erzurum, Turkey.

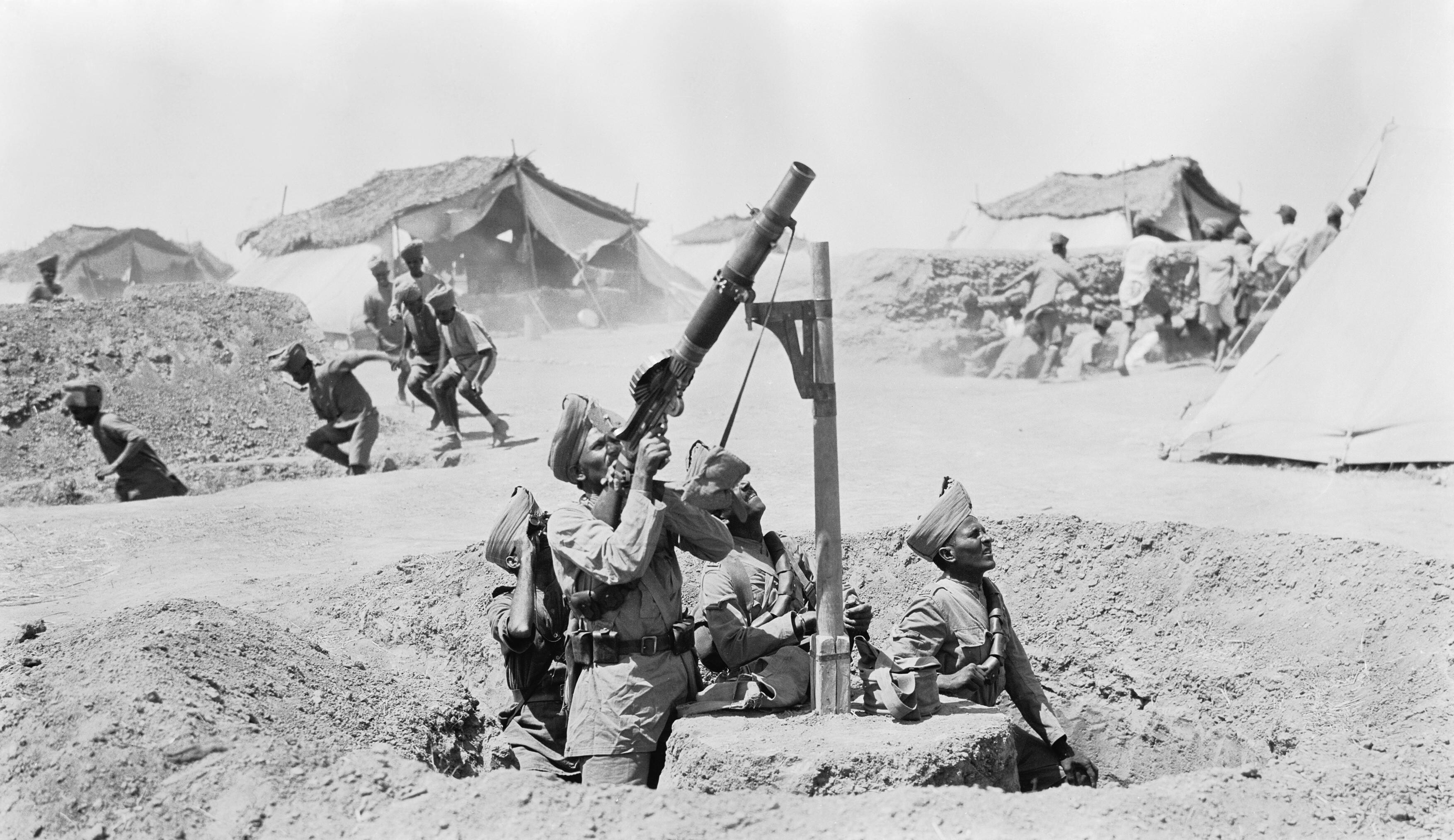
Indian anti-aircraft machine gunners in action during Mesopotamian campaign.

The following events occurred in January 1916:

== January 1, 1916 (Saturday) ==
Team captains for Brown Bears (left) and Washington State meet referee Walter Eckersall of Chicago just before kickoff at the 1916 Rose Bowl.

- Second Battle of Jaunde – Allied forces occupied the capital of Jaunde of German Cameroon.
- Senussi campaign – Aerial reconnaissance spotted a Senussi camp of 80 tents 35 mi (56 km) southeast of British garrison at Matruh in North Africa. A desert column mobilized to capture the camp but 10 days of torrential rain delayed the assault.
- British troop ship Geelong sank while returning soldiers from the Gallipoli campaign in the Mediterranean Sea after colliding with another ship. All soldiers and crew on board were rescued.
- The British Royal Army Medical Corps carried out the first successful blood transfusion using blood that had been stored and cooled.
- Ross Sea party – Marooned onshore in the Antarctic after the British polar exploration ship Aurora lost anchor and drifted in May 1915, the 10-man party of the second arm of the Imperial Trans-Antarctic Expedition split up. Four scientists manned a post at Cape Evans while the other six sledged to lay down a depot at Mount Hope near the Beardmore Glacier where the first arm of the expedition was expected to reach (unknown to them, the first arm of the expedition was also marooned).
- The Washington State Cougars football team defeated Brown University 14–0 in front of an estimated 10,000 spectators in the second Rose Bowl, after a 15-year hiatus.
- The association football club Estrela do Norte was established in Cachoeiro de Itapemirim, Brazil.
- Born:
  - Rehavam Amir, Lithuanian-Israeli diplomat, diplomat to the United Kingdom from 1953 to 1958; as Rehavam Zabludovsky, in Vilnius, Lithuania (d. 2013)
  - Manuel Manahan, Filipino politician, co-founder of the Progressive Party of the Philippines, member of the Senate of the Philippines from 1961 to 1967; in Manila, Philippine Islands (present-day Philippines) (d. 1994)

== January 2, 1916 (Sunday) ==
- HMS E2, the last British submarine to operate in the Sea of Marmara within Turkey, was recalled by the Royal Navy, bringing an end to the 1915 Marmara campaign. During 1915, British subs torpedoed and sank two battleships, one destroyer, five gunboats, seven ammunition ships, and nine transport ships in the Ottoman Navy, along with 30 steamers and 188 sailing vessels, and "so harassed enemy shipping as to practically paralyze it by the autumn."
- Died:
  - Joseph Rucker Lamar, 58, American judge, Associate Justice of the Supreme Court of the United States from 1910 to 1916 (b. 1857)
  - Félix Sardà y Salvany, 71, Spanish clergy and writer, editor of the Catholic newspaper La Revista Popular, author of Liberalism is a Sin (b. 1844)

== January 3, 1916 (Monday) ==
- The Sykes–Picot Agreement, a secret treaty between the United Kingdom and France to define their claims for the division of Arab territories in the Ottoman Empire in the event of a Central Powers defeat, was signed by Sir Mark Sykes, Assistant Secretary for Middle Eastern Affairs to the British War Cabinet, and French diplomat François Georges-Picot. In the agreement, what are now Syria and Lebanon were to be under French control, Iraq under British control, and Palestine (incorporating modern-day Israel and Lebanon) was to be under joint control.
- Britain's Secret Service Bureau (now the Secret Intelligence Service) was reorganized to create several Special Branch law enforcement departments within the SSB, including Section 5 of the Directorate of Military Intelligence, or MI5, the United Kingdom's domestic counter-intelligence and security agency.
- Born:
  - Maxene Andrews, American singer, one of The Andrews Sisters, best-selling group sold over 75 million records; in Mound, Minnesota, United States (d. 1995)
  - Betty Furness, American actress and consumer activist, lead actress for the 1950 TV series Studio One, special assistant to the President of Consumer Affairs for the Federal Trade Commission; as Elizabeth Mary Furness, in New York City, United States (d. 1994)
- Died: Grenville M. Dodge, 84, railroad executive and Union Army officer, chief engineer of the First transcontinental railroad (b. 1831)

== January 4, 1916 (Tuesday) ==
- Siege of Kut – A British relief force of over 13,000 men was dispatched to Kut, Mesopotamia (now Iraq) to resupply the defending British Indian Army.
- British noble John Hamilton-Gordon became the first to be awarded the title of Marquess of Aberdeen and Temair.
- Born:
  - Roy Fransen, British high diver and stuntman; as Royston Albert Fransen, in Tottenham, north London, England (d. 1985)
  - Lionel Newman, American film composer, Oscar winner for the soundtrack for the musical Hello, Dolly!; in New Haven, Connecticut, United States (d. 1989)
  - Princess Niloufer, Ottoman noble, one of the last princesses of the Ottoman Empire; as Nilufer Hanımsultan, in Istanbul, Ottoman Empire (present-day Turkey) (d. 1989)
- Died: Bruce Sloss, 27, Australian association football player, played for Essendon, Sydney Swans, and Brighton; killed in action at Armentières, France (b. 1889)

== January 5, 1916 (Wednesday) ==
- Montenegrin campaign – The Montenegrin Army was ordered to defend the retreating Serbian army as Austria-Hungary launched an offensive against Montenegro.
- Royal Navy destroyer HMS Turbulent was launched at the Hawthorn Leslie and Company shipyard in Newcastle upon Tyne, England. It would be sunk at the Battle of Jutland six months later.
- Baron Bean, a comic strip by George Herriman, debuted through the King Features Syndicate owned by William Randolph Hearst.
- Born: Maup Caransa, Dutch business executive, leading real estate developer in post-World War II Amsterdam, famously kidnapped for ransom in 1977; as Maurits Caransa, in Amsterdam, Netherlands (d. 2009)
- Died:
  - Ulpiano Checa, 55, Spanish artist, known for such works as including painting for Le Train Bleu in 1900, recipient of the Legion of Honour (b. 1860)
  - Harry Hems, 71, British sculptor, leading artist of Gothic Revival architecture with noted restoration works such as the St Albans Cathedral in England (b. 1842)
  - Sam Lucas, 75, American actor, first African American to portray Uncle Tom in both stage and screen adaptations of Uncle Tom's Cabin (b. 1848)
  - E. J. Woods, 76-77, Australian architect, designer of St. Peter's Cathedral and State Parliament House in Adelaide, Australia (b. 1839)

== January 6, 1916 (Thursday) ==
- Battle of Mojkovac – An Austro-Hungarian force of 20,000 men attacked dug-in Montenegrin positions near Mojkovac, Montenegro. Despite out being vastly outnumbered, the Montenegrin Army of 6,000 repulsed the attack and inflicted 2,000 casualties.
- Battle of Sheikh Sa'ad – The British relief force of 13,000 under command of Major-General George Younghusband ran into a force with the Ottoman Sixth Army while on a relief mission to Kut in the Mesopotamia, and suffered 600 casualties the first day.
- Royal Navy battleship HMS King Edward VII struck a mine laid down by German cruiser SMS Möwe off the coast of Scotland and sank while being towed to shore by British destroyer HMS Fortune.
- British submarine HMS E17 was wrecked offshore of the Netherlands, with all crew rescued by Dutch cruiser HNLMS Noordbrabant.
- Following its evacuation from Gallipoli, the French Expeditionary Force of the Orient was absorbed into the larger Army of the Orient based in the Greek port of Salonika.
- The Italian steamship Brindisi, sailing from Italy to Shengjin and carrying Montenegrin and Serbian volunteers from Canada and the US (that had previously arrived in Italy from Halifax) along with a few Red Cross volunteers, struck a mine in front of Shengjin at 08:05 local time and sank within minutes; hundreds of people died, including three crew members.
- Born:
  - Herbert Choy, American judge, first Asian American to serve as a federal judge, senior judge for United States Court of Appeals for the Ninth Circuit from 1971 to 1984; in Kaumakani, Territory of Hawaii, United States (present-day Hawaii) (d. 2004)
  - Phil Masi, American baseball player, catcher for the Boston Braves, Pittsburgh Pirates and Chicago White Sox from 1939 to 1952; as Philip Samuel Masi, in Chicago, United States (d. 1990)
- Died: Joseph Maurice Pambet, 61, French army officer, commander of the French 22nd Infantry Division that was involved in most of the first major battles of World War I on the Western Front including the First Battle of the Marne; killed in a car accident (b. 1854)

== January 7, 1916 (Friday) ==
- Battle of Mojkovac – The Austro-Hungarians retreated after a second failed attack on Mojkovac, with heavy casualties on both sides. The Montenegrin force held the line for another 11 days before retreating.
- Battle of Sheikh Sa'ad – With extra cavalry and artillery units sent by Lieutenant General Fenton Aylmer, British forces under Major General George Younghusband renewed attacks on Ottoman Sixth Army positions. A combination of heavy fog and little cover from enemy slowed the advance but allowed the British to force Ottoman forces to pull back.
- Royal Air Force No. 34 Squadron was established from elements of No. 19.
- The University of Oregon fight song "Mighty Oregon" was first performed by the Eugene Municipal Band in Eugene, Oregon. The song has a similar tune to the popular hit "It's a Long Way to Tipperary".
- Born:
  - Elena Ceaușescu, Romanian politician, Deputy Prime Minister and First Lady of Romania, wife of Romanian president Nicolae Ceaușescu; as Lenuța Petrescu, in Petrești, Dâmbovița, Kingdom of Romania (present-day Romania) (executed, 1989)
  - Paul Keres, Estonian chess player, considered the best chess player never to win a world champions, four-time runner-up at the Candidates Tournament; in Narva, Russian Empire (present-day Estonia) (d. 1975)
  - Teresio Olivelli, Italian soldier and resistance fighter, member of the Italian resistance movement during World War II; in Como, Kingdom of Italy (present-day Italy) (killed in prison, 1944)
  - Togo Tanaka, American journalist, reported on camp conditions while part of the internment of Japanese Americans during World War II; in Portland, Oregon, United States (d. 2009)
  - Al Hostak, American boxer, held the world middleweight title from 1938 to 1940; as Albert Paul Hostak, in Minneapolis, United States (d. 2006)

== January 8, 1916 (Saturday) ==
- Battle of Sheikh Sa'ad – The British successfully captured Sheikh Sa'ad in the Mesopotamia at a cost of 4,400 casualties (with reports of a similar amount for the Ottoman Empire).
- Russian battleship Imperatritsa Ekaterina Velikaya exchanged fire with the Ottoman battlecruiser Yavuz Sultan Selim in the Black Sea. While the action was minor, it proved the Russian navy now had control of the Black Sea and forced the Ottoman Navy to focus on defending the Dardanelles.
- St. Louis gangster William "Skippy" Rohan of the Egan's Rats was gunned down just after midnight in a saloon by gang member Harry "Cherries" Dunn following a heated exchange in which one accused the other of "snitching" to the St. Louis police department. Dunn's shooting of Rohan severed all ties with the Egan's Rats and marked him for death, leading to Dunn's murder nine months later.
- Royal Navy battle cruiser HMS Repulse was launched by John Brown & Company in Clydebank, Scotland. It would see action at the Second Battle of Heligoland Bight in 1917.
- The Coliseum Theater opened in Seattle as the city's first movie theatre, and was listed on the National Register of Historic Places in 1975.
- Born: John Davies, British business executive and politician, first Director of the Confederation of British Industry, first Secretary of State for Trade and Industry; in Blackheath, London, England (d. 1979)
- Died:
  - Eugene W. Hilgard, 83, German American agriculturalist, credited as the father of modern soil sciences (b. 1833)
  - Ada Rehan, 58, Irish-born American stage actress, one of the "Big Four" stage leads for Daly's Fifth Avenue Theatre on Broadway; died of cancer and arteriosclerosis (b. 1857)
  - Samuel Way, 79, Australian judge, Chief Justice of the Supreme Court of South Australia from 1876 to 1916 (b. 1836)

== January 9, 1916 (Sunday) ==
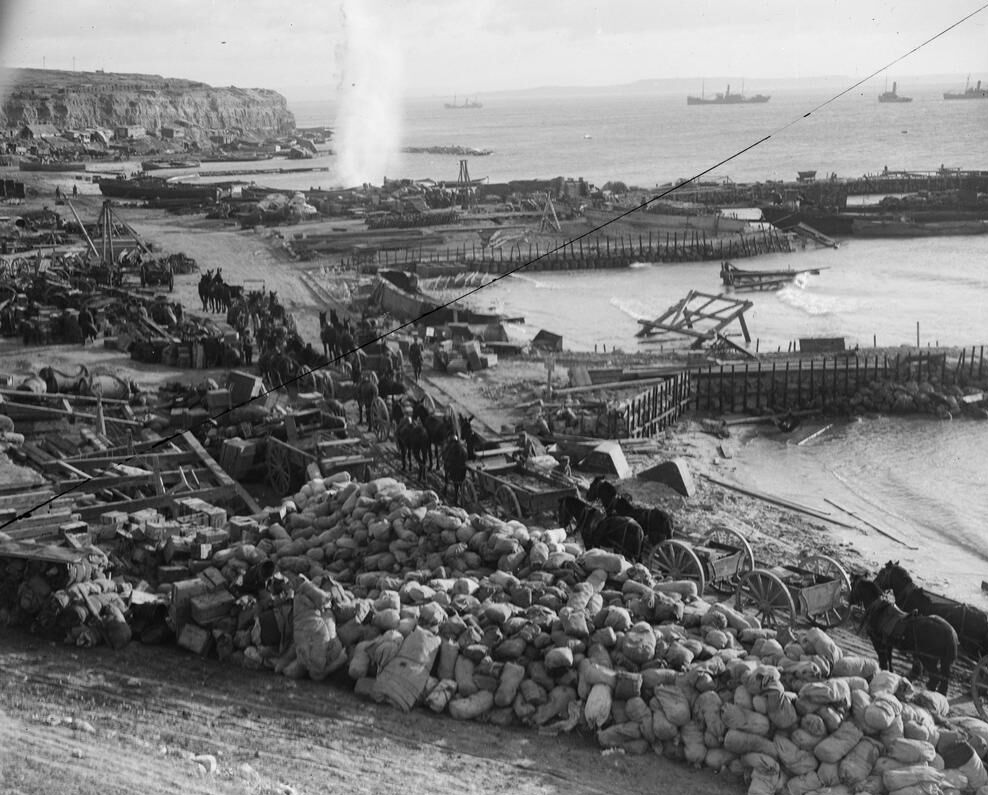
W Beach, Helles, on 7 January 1916 just prior to the final evacuation

- Gallipoli campaign – The last British troops evacuated from Gallipoli, as the Ottoman Empire prevailed over a joint British and French operation to capture Constantinople.
- The association football club Cachoeiro was established in Cachoeiro de Itapemirim, Brazil.
- Born:
  - Vic Mizzy, American TV theme composer, best known for his themes for Green Acres and The Addams Family; as Victor Mizzy, in New York City, United States (d. 2009)
  - Ernie Schroeder, American comic book artist, best known for his work on Airboy and Spirit of '76; as Ernest Schroeder, in New York City, United States (d. 2006)
  - Peter Twinn, English mathematician and code-breaker, one of the intelligence team to crack the Enigma machine code during World War II; in Streatham, London, England (d. 2004)
- Died: Edward Levy-Lawson, 82, British publisher, founder of The Daily Telegraph (b. 1833)

== January 10, 1916 (Monday) ==
- Erzurum Offensive – The Russian Empire launched a major assault on the Erzurum Province in eastern Turkey within the Ottoman Empire.
- Montenegrin campaign – Austro-Hungarian forces captured the city of Berane, Montenegro.
- The operetta Szibill, starring Julia Sanderson, Donald Brian and Joseph Cawthorn, made its American premiere at the Liberty Theatre in New York City and ran for 168 performances.
- Born:
  - Sune Bergström, Swedish biochemist, recipient of the Nobel Prize in Physiology or Medicine for his research into prostaglandins; as Karl Sune Detlof Bergström, in Stockholm, Sweden (d. 2004)
  - William Buchan, British poet, author of Personal Poems, Kumari, and The Rags Of Time (d. 2008)
- Died:
  - Tadeusz Ajdukiewicz, 63-64, Polish painter, known for realist paintings including events from the January Uprising in 1863, member of the 1st Brigade, Polish Legions; killed in action at Kraków (b. 1852)
  - Guido Baccelli, 85, Italian physician, co-founder of Policlinico Umberto I, the second-largest hospital in Italy (b. 1830)

== January 11, 1916 (Tuesday) ==
- Montenegrin campaign – Austria-Hungary captured the mountain of Lovćen in Montenegro, which had been the country's key artillery base for defending its border.
- The minority government under Prime Minister Hubert Loutsch for Luxembourg dissolved after succumbing to a vote of no confidence.
- Mexican militia reportedly with Pancho Villa forced sixteen American employees of the American Smelting and Refining Company from a train near Santa Isabel, Chihuahua, and summarily stripped and executed them.
- Born: Jimmy Quillen, American politician, U.S. Representative from Tennessee from 1963 to 1997; as James Henry Quillen, in Scott County, Virginia, United States (d. 2003)

== January 12, 1916 (Wednesday) ==
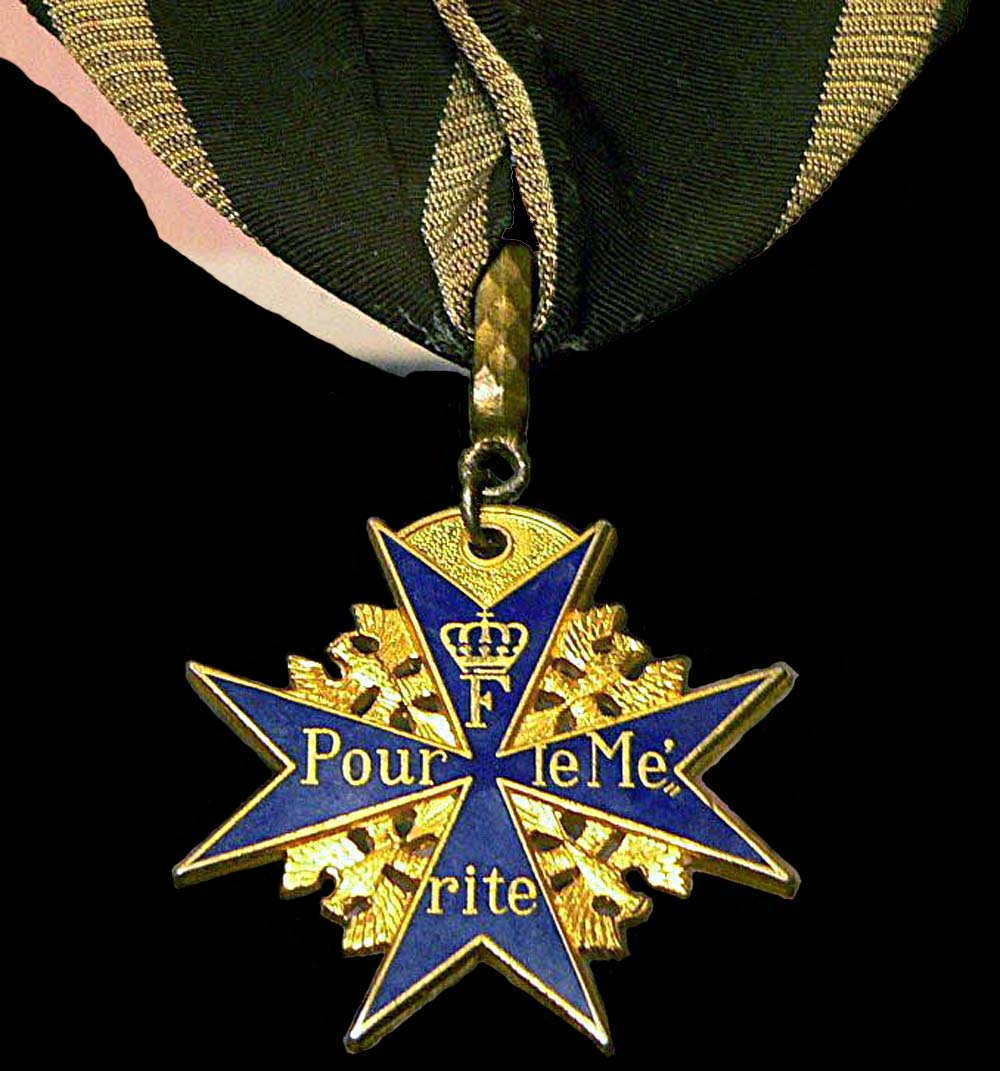
Blue Max, German military decoration

- Montenegrin campaign – With the imminent loss of Montenegrin capital of Cetinje, as well as the cities of Peć and Berane, King Nicholas was persuaded to begin surrender negotiations with Austria-Hungary.
- German flying aces Max Immelmann and Oswald Boelcke, each with eight kills, were the first pilots awarded the Blue Max.
- Royal Air Force No. 32 and No. 33 Squadrons were established.
- The Ise Electric Railway extended the Nagoya Line in the Mie Prefecture, Japan, with station Chiyozaki serving the line.
- Born:
  - P. W. Botha, South African state leader, last Prime Minister of South Africa from 1978 to 1984 and first State President of South Africa from 1984 to 1989; as Pieter Willem Botha, in Paul Roux, South Africa (d. 2006)
  - Ruth R. Benerito, American chemist, patented many fabrics for the textile industry including wrinkle-resistant fabric; as Ruth Mary Rogan, in New Orleans, United States (d. 2013)
  - Mary Wilson, English poet, known for Selected Poems and New Poems anthologies, wife to British Prime Minister Harold Wilson; as Gladys Mary Baldwin, in Diss, Norfolk, England (d. 2018)
- Died: Georgios Theotokis, 71, Greek state leader, held the position of Prime Minister of Greece four times (b. 1844)

== January 13, 1916 (Thursday) ==
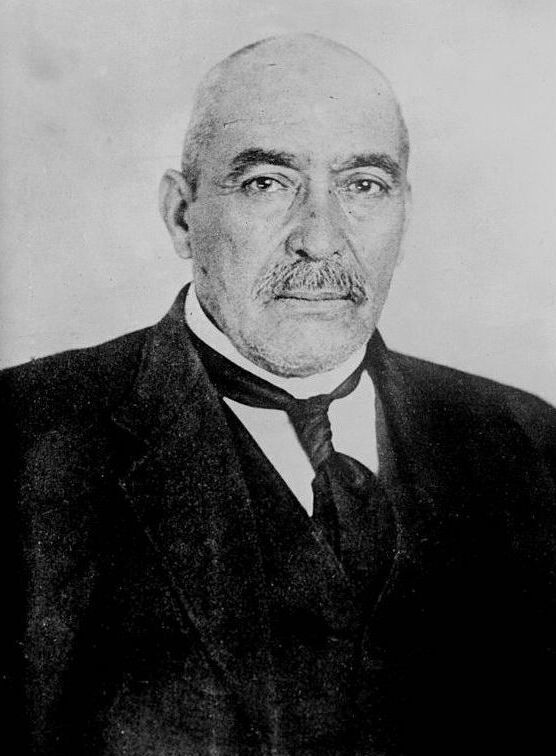
Victoriano Huerta, former President of Mexico

- Battle of Wadi – A British force of 19,000 men under command of Lieutenant-General Fenton Aylmer attacked an Ottoman defensive force of 22,500 along the Wadi River in what is now modern-day Iraq, but a cost of 1,600 men compared to the 527 lost on the Ottoman side. The battle only further weakened British attempts to relieve beleaguered forces under command of General Charles Townshend in Kut.
- Montenegrin campaign – An Austrian force entered the Montenegrin capital of Cetinje.
- Battle of Koprukoy – A Russian force of 75,000 men under command of Nikolai Yudenich clashed with members of the Ottoman Third Army under command of Abdul Kerim Pasha during the Erzurum Offensive.
- Senussi campaign – An Allied desert column arrived at Senussi camp spotted by air southeast of Matruh in North Africa, only to find the camp deserted. Despite the lack of findings, a needed telegraph line was repaired before the column returned to base.
- The field artillery XX Brigade was established for service in the Sinai and Palestine campaign.
- The Curtiss Aeroplane Company, Curtiss Motor Company, and two other aircraft manufactures merged to form the Curtiss Aeroplane and Motor Company.
- Died: Victoriano Huerta, 65, Mexican army officer and state leader, 35th President of Mexico (b. 1854)

== January 14, 1916 (Friday) ==
- Storm flooding caused dikes to burst at Zuiderzee, Netherlands, killing 19 people. Ships caught out at sea also resulted in a further 32 casualties.
- Battle of Koprukoy – Russian forces began to repel counterattacks made by the Ottoman Third Army.
- Irish revolutionary leader Michael Collins resigned his job in London and returned to Ireland.
- In response to high losses German Fokker Eindecker fighters were inflicting on Allied reconnaissance aircraft flying over the Western Front, Royal Flying Corps Headquarters ordered that reconnaissance planes have an escort of at least three fighters flying in close formation with them, and that a reconnaissance aircraft must abort its flight if even one of the three fighters becomes detached from the formation for any reason.
- Born: Leonard Siffleet, Australian commando, member of the Services Reconnaissance Department in Papua New Guinea during World War II; in Gunnedah, Australia (executed, 1943)

== January 15, 1916 (Saturday) ==
- Battle of Koprukoy – Russia broke through the Ottoman defense line.
- A massive fire destroyed much of downtown Bergen, Norway over a 10-hour period. Altogether, 380 buildings were burned down and 2,700 people were left homeless.
- An explosion on U.S. Navy submarine USS E-2 in the Brooklyn Navy Yard killed four servicemen.
- The Bay Ridge Avenue, 77th Street, and 86th Street subway stations opened along the BMT Fourth Avenue Line in New York City.
- The American anarchist publication The Blast released its first issue and would run for just over one year.
- The Austrian operetta House of the Three Girls by Franz Schubert premiered at the Raimund Theater in Vienna and would run for 650 performances. Following the end of World War I, the operetta was adapted in French and English.
- Norwegian sports club Tiller was established in Trondheim, Norway and offered association football, team handball, ice hockey, Nordic skiing and biathlon.
- Born:
  - Maurice Bavaud, Swiss theologian, attempted to assassinate Adolf Hitler in 1938; in Neuchâtel, Switzerland (executed, 1941)
  - Hugh Gibb, English musician, patriarch of the Gibb family of musicians including Barry, Robin, Maurice and Andy Gibb; in Chorlton, Manchester, England (d. 1992)
  - Ron Guthrey, New Zealand politician, 40th Mayor of Christchurch; as Albert Ronald Guthrey, in Rawene, New Zealand (d. 2008)
  - Alexandru Robot, Romanian poet, leading promoter of modernism and avant-garde poetry in Eastern Europe; as Alter Rotmann, in Bucharest, Kingdom of Romania (present-day Romania) (disappeared in 1941)

== January 16, 1916 (Sunday) ==
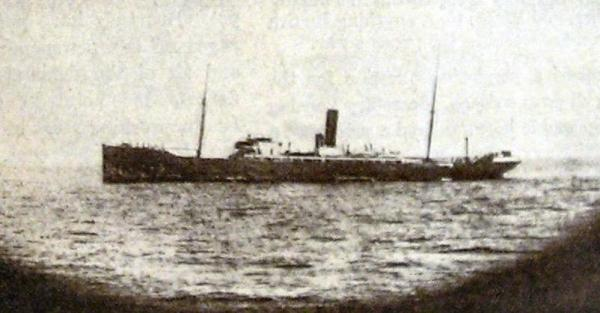
SMS Möwe, photo taken from SS Appam in January 1916.

- Battle of Koprukoy – Ottoman forces began their retreat to their fortress near Erzurum, Turkey.
- German auxiliary cruiser SMS Möwe, disguised as a merchant ship, attacked and captured a British steamer south of the island of Madeira in the Atlantic Ocean, killing 18 sailors, wounded five more, and took the ship's command and survivors prisoner before scuttling the ship.
- American actress Billie Burke made her screen debut in the film comedy Peggy, directed by Thomas H. Ince.
- Died:
  - Arnold Aletrino, 57, Dutch physician, pioneer researcher into homosexuality and the theory it was a natural-occurring sexual orientation (b. 1858)
  - Juana María Condesa Lluch, 53, Spanish nun, established the Handmaids of Mary Immaculate order in Valencia, Spain, beatified by Pope John Paul II in 2003 (b. 1862)

== January 17, 1916 (Monday) ==
- Manuel Estrada Cabrera was re-elected for a third term as President of Guatemala after running unopposed in the presidential election.
- Born:
  - Charles F. Hockett, American linguist, leading researcher in language structuralism; in Columbus, Ohio, United States (d. 2000)
  - Edmund Morgan, American historian, leading expert on American colonial history; in Minneapolis, United States (d. 2013)
- Died: Marie Bracquemond, 75, French artist, referred to as "les trois grandes dames" or "the three great women" of Impressionism (b. 1841)

== January 18, 1916 (Tuesday) ==
- Montenegrin campaign – The Montenegrin army pulled back from the line between Berane and Mojkovac allowing Austria-Hungary to resume advancing south towards Albania.
- The world's first practical all-metal aircraft, the Junkers J 1, flew for the first time.
- Scottish polar vessel Scotia (originally the Norwegian whaler ship Hekla), best known for being used for exploration by the Scottish National Antarctic Expedition, caught fire and sank off the coast of Wales, with all crew rescued.
- Born:
  - Silviu Brucan, Romanian author and politician, one of the authors of the Letter of the Six that led to the overthrow of the Nicolae Ceaușescu regime; as Saul Bruckner, in Bucharest, Kingdom of Romania (present-day Romania) (d. 2006)
  - James F. Crow, American geneticist, leading researcher on the paternal age effect on DNA; in Phoenixville, Pennsylvania, United States (d. 2012)
- Died: Lorenzo Latorre, 71, Uruguayan state leader, 26th President of Uruguay (b. 1844)

== January 19, 1916 (Wednesday) ==
- Battle of Koprukoy – Ottoman forces regrouped at the Erzurum fortress Turkey, losing 20,000 out of the 65,000 men they started with while the Russian force lost 12,000 out of 75,000 men.
- Montenegrin campaign – King Nicholas of Montenegro fled to Italy.
- Senussi campaign – The main Senussi camp that eluded Allied scouts was finally located by air reconnaissance 22 mi (35 km) southwest of Matruh in North Africa.
- Born:
  - Harry Huskey, American computer engineer, designer of the SWAC and Bendix computers; in the Great Smoky Mountains, North Carolina, United States (d. 2017)
  - Brion Gysin, English artist, best known for his collaborations with writer William S. Burroughs, inventor of the Dreamachine; in Taplow, England (d. 1986)
- Died: Isaac S. Catlin, 80, American Union Army officer, recipient of the Medal of Honor for action at the Battle of the Crater during the American Civil War; died of complications from a stroke (b. 1835)

== January 20, 1916 (Thursday) ==
- Ivan Goremykin was dismissed from his position as Prime Minister of Russia and Boris Shturmer was appointed by Tsar Nicholas II to replace him.
- Died:
  - Ephraim Francis Baldwin, 78, American architect, best known for designing the train stations for the Baltimore and Ohio Railroad and for many Catholic churches including Cathedral of St. John the Baptist in Savannah, Georgia and St. Leo's Church in Baltimore (b. 1837)
  - Nedeljko Čabrinović, 20, Serbian revolutionary, one of the conspirators involved in the assassination of Archduke Franz Ferdinand; died in prison (b. 1895)

== January 21, 1916 (Friday) ==
- Battle of Hanna – A British force of around 10,000 men under command of Lieutenant General Fenton Aylmer attacked the Ottoman line defended by an estimated 30,000 soldiers along the Tigris, and lost 2,741 men compared to the 503 casualties on the Ottoman side. The defeat left British forces defending Kut completely vulnerable.
- The German air squadron Jagdstaffel 5 was established as the first dedicated fighting squadron for the Imperial German Flying Corps although it would not be mobilized until August 21.
- The British Army cavalry units I and II Brigades were dissolved with the 2nd Mounted Division following their completion of service at the Gallipoli campaign.
- Died: Louis H. Carpenter, 76, American Union Army officer, commander during the Battle of Gettysburg and the American Indian Wars, recipient of the Medal of Honor (b. 1839)

== January 22, 1916 (Saturday) ==
- Senussi campaign – A desert column with the Allied Western Frontier Force prepared to assault the main Senussi in North Africa.
- Born:
  - Bill Durnan, Canadian hockey player, goaltender for the Montreal Canadiens, two-time winner of the Stanley Cup; as William Ronald Durnan, in Toronto, Canada (d. 1972)
  - Riza Lushta, Albanian association football player, played centre forward for various clubs from 1934 to 1953 including Tirana and Juventus; in Mitrovica, Kingdom of Serbia (present-day Kosovo) (d. 1997)
  - Henri Dutilleux, French composer, known for his compositions Tout un monde lointain... and L'arbre des songes; in Angers, France (d. 2013)
  - Stephen C. O'Connell, American lawyer and academic, 6th President of the University of Florida; in West Palm Beach, Florida, United States (d. 2001)

== January 23, 1916 (Sunday) ==
- Senussi campaign – Troops with the Western Frontier Force attacked the Senussi but were soon outflanked, forcing defensive maneuvers that allowed the main body of Senussi to escape. British casualties were 21 killed and 291 wounded while captured Senussi estimated 200 killed and 500 wounded on their side.
- Born:
  - David Douglas Duncan, American war photojournalist, covered the Battle of Okinawa and Japanese surrender on the USS Missouri; in Kansas City, Missouri, United States (d. 2018)
  - Paul B. Johnson Jr., American politician, 54th Governor of Mississippi, son of Paul B. Johnson Sr.; in Hattiesburg, Mississippi, United States (d. 1985)
  - Airey Neave, British politician, Shadow Secretary of State for Northern Ireland from 1974 to 1979; in Knightsbridge, London, England (assassinated, 1979)
- Died: Isa Boletini, 52, Albanian partisan, one of the leaders of the Albanian Revolt; killed by Montenegrin forces (b. 1864)

== January 24, 1916 (Monday) ==
- Vice Admiral Reinhard Scheer was appointed commander of Germany's High Seas Fleet after Hugo von Pohl proved too ill to continue command.
- Senussi campaign – Air reconnaissance located the new Senussi camp but Allied forces stood down for rest and waited for the wet weather to improve before moving.
- In Browning, Montana, the temperature dropped from +6.7 to −48.8 °C (44.1 to −55.8 °F) in one day, the greatest change ever on record for a 24-hour period.
- The Supreme Court of the United States upheld the national income tax in the decision concerning Brushaber v. Union Pacific Railroad Co..
- The Persian-language magazine Kaveh, named after the Persian mythical hero, began publication out of the Federal Foreign Office in Berlin.
- Born:
  - Rafael Caldera, Venezuelan state leader, 56th and 63rd President of Venezuela from 1969 to 1974 and 1994 to 1999 respectively; in San Felipe, Yaracuy, Venezuela (d. 2009)
  - Jack Brickhouse, American sportscaster, best known for his play-by-play coverage of Chicago Cubs games on WGN-TV from 1948 to 1981; as John Beasley Brickhouse, in Peoria, Illinois, United States (d. 1998)
  - Walter A. Haas Jr., American business executive, chairman and CEO of Levi Strauss & Co. from 1958 to 1981; in San Francisco, United States (d. 1995)
  - Gene Mako, Hungarian-born American tennis player, five-time Grand Slam doubles champion in the 1930s; as Constantine Eugene Mako, in Budapest, Austria-Hungary (present-day Hungary) (d. 2013)
  - Sudirman, Indonesian army officer, first commander of the Indonesian National Armed Forces; in Purbalingga Regency, Dutch East Indies (present-day Indonesia) (d. 1950)
  - Daphne Lorraine Gum, Australian healthcare worker, pioneer in treatment and care of children with cerebral palsy; in Pinnaroo, South Australia, Australia (d. 2017)

== January 25, 1916 (Tuesday) ==
- Montenegrin campaign – Montenegro formally surrendered to Austria-Hungary.
- Born:
  - Pop Ivy, American football coach, noted for being the only coach to serve in both the National Football League and American Football League, including the St. Louis Cardinals, Houston Oilers, and New York Giants; as Lee Frank Ivy, in Skiatook, Oklahoma, United States (d. 2003)
  - Eli Waldron, American writer, best known for short fiction and non-fiction including "The Beekeeper" and "The Death of Hank Williams"; in Oconto Falls, Wisconsin, United States (killed in a car accident, 1980)

== January 26, 1916 (Wednesday) ==
- Ross Sea party – The sledging party of the second arm of the Imperial Trans-Antarctic Expedition reached Mount Hope near the Beardmore Glacier to lay down a depot for the first arm of the expedition that was expected to reach the location in the coming weeks, even though the actual party was marooned on drifting ice in the Weddell Sea. One of the sledging party, Arnold Spencer-Smith, had taken ill during the trek and was left in a tent along the route while the party completed their mission.

== January 27, 1916 (Thursday) ==
- The British government passed legislation that introduced conscription in Great Britain.
- Died: Francis Ley, 70, British industrialist and sports executive, founder of Vulcan Iron Works in Derby and the Derby County Baseball Club (b. 1846)

== January 28, 1916 (Friday) ==
- Women were given the right to vote in Manitoba, the first Canadian province to do so.
- The opera Goyescas by Enrique Granados premiered at the Metropolitan Opera in New York City, the first Spanish opera ever to be performed there.
- Born:
  - Dottie Hunter, Canadian baseball player, played first base for the All-American Girls Professional Baseball League; as Dorothy Hunter, in Winnipeg, Canada (d. 2005)
  - Dale Alford, American politician, U.S. Representative from Arkansas from 1959 to 1963; as Thomas Dale Alford, in New Hope, Pike County, Arkansas, United States (d. 2000)

== January 29, 1916 (Saturday) ==
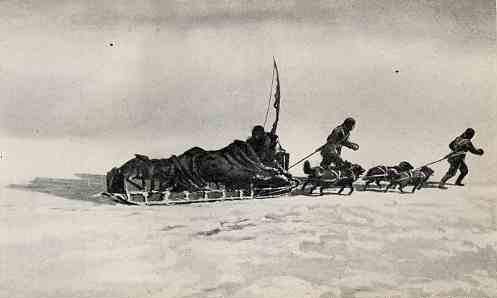
Sick members of the Ross Sea party are pulled along on a sledge during the return trip from Mount Hope in Antarctica.

- Erzurum Offensive – Ottoman General Mahmud Kâmil Pasha, command of the Ottoman Third Army, arrived from Istanbul after learning the Russians had successfully broken through the Ottoman defense line in the Erzurum Province and began making new defense plans against the offensive.
- Ross Sea party – The sledging party of the second arm of the Imperial Trans-Antarctic Expedition picked up ailing Arnold Spencer-Smith on their return from Mount Hope, who was now too weak to walk and had to be carried in a sledge. Expedition leader Aeneas Mackintosh also became too weak to pull and later had to be carried by sledge.
- Born:
  - Bill Lawrence, American journalist, White House correspondent of The New York Times during the 1950s and political affairs editor for ABC News during the 1960s, recipient of the 1965 Peabody Award and 1972 Emmy Award; as William H. Lawrence, in Lincoln, Nebraska, United States (d. 1972)
  - Harry Peulevé, British-French special agent, member of the Special Operations Executive during World War II and escapee from the Buchenwald concentration camp; in Hastings, England (d. 1963)

== January 30, 1916 (Sunday) ==
- A German zeppelin bombed Paris, killing six civilians and wounding another 30 people.
- The Italian air squadron 71a Squadriglia was established in Turin as Italy's first fighter squadron.
- Arthur Warren Waite, a dentist from Grand Rapids, Michigan, poisoned his mother-in-law Hannah M. Carpenter using arsenic while she stayed at his home in New York City. It was the first of two murders, the second being Waite's father-in-law Jon E. Peck who arrived two months later following his wife's death.
- Born: Ethel du Pont, American heiress and socialite, granddaughter to Eugene du Pont and wife to Franklin Delano Roosevelt Jr.; in Wilmington, Delaware, United States (d. 1965, suicide)
- Died:
  - Joseph Jacobs, 61, Australian folklorist, collected and popularized many popular English fairy tales in English Fairy Tales and More English Fairy Tales (b. 1854)
  - Clements Markham, 85, English geographer, chief organizer of the Discovery Expedition to the Antarctic (b. 1830)

== January 31, 1916 (Monday) ==
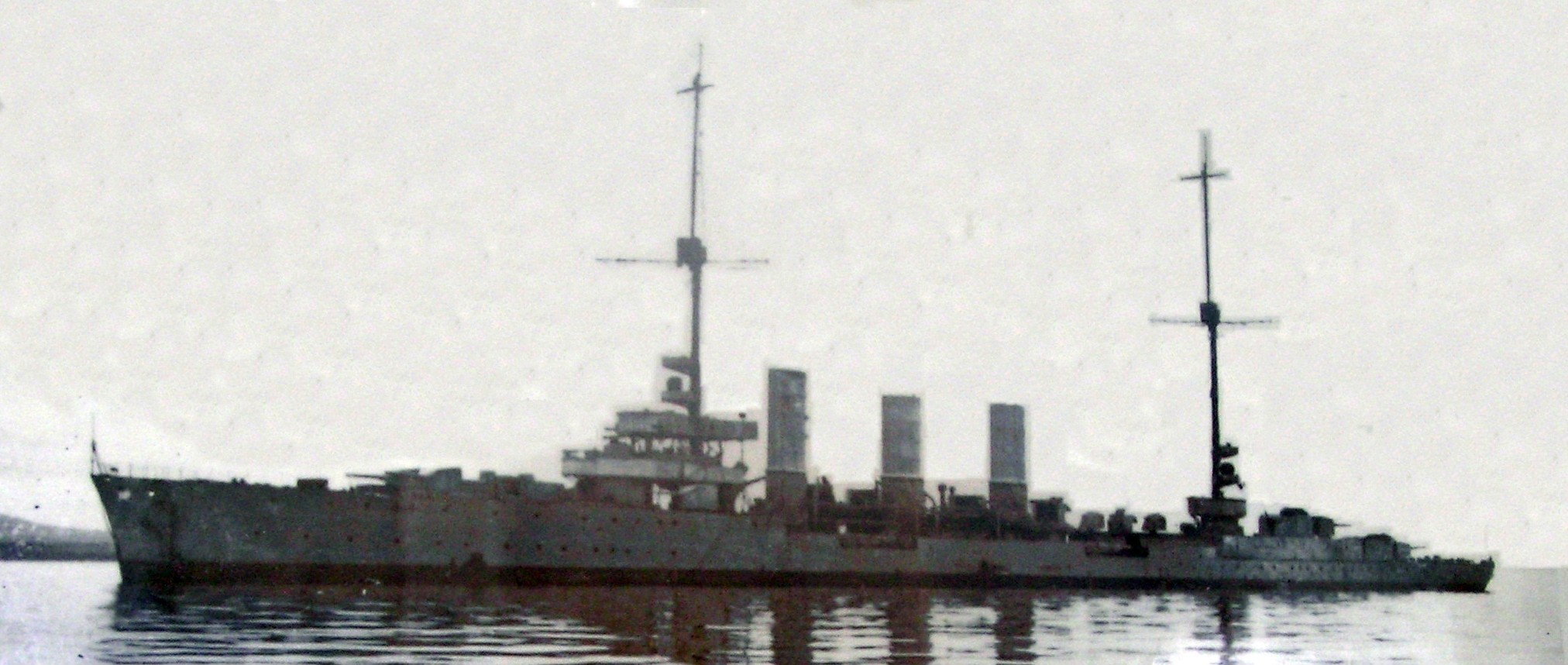
SMS Karlsruhe

- German airships resumed bombing raids against Great Britain, as nine Imperial German Navy zeppelins led by the chief of the German Naval Airship Division Peter Strasser attempted to attack Liverpool. Most of their bombing targets were scattered widely around the English Midlands and did not reach the city.
- German cruiser SMS Karlsruhe was launched at the Kaiserliche Werft Kiel in Kiel, Germany and would play a role in Operation Albion the following year.
- Born: Sangoulé Lamizana, Voltiac state leader, 2nd President of the Republic of Upper Volta in West Africa (now Burkina Faso); as Aboubakar Sangoulé Lamizana, in Dianra, French Upper Volta (present-day Ivory Coast) (d. 2005)
