= December 1915 =

Month of 1915

<<	December 1915					>>
Su	Mo	Tu	We	Th	Fr	Sa
			1	2	3	4
5	6	7	8	9	10	11
12	13	14	15	16	17	18
19	20	21	22	23	24	25
26	27	28	29	30	31

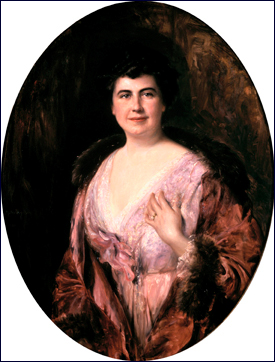
U.S. First Lady Edith Bolling Galt Wilson, official White House portrait.

The following events occurred in December 1915:

== December 1, 1915 (Wednesday) ==
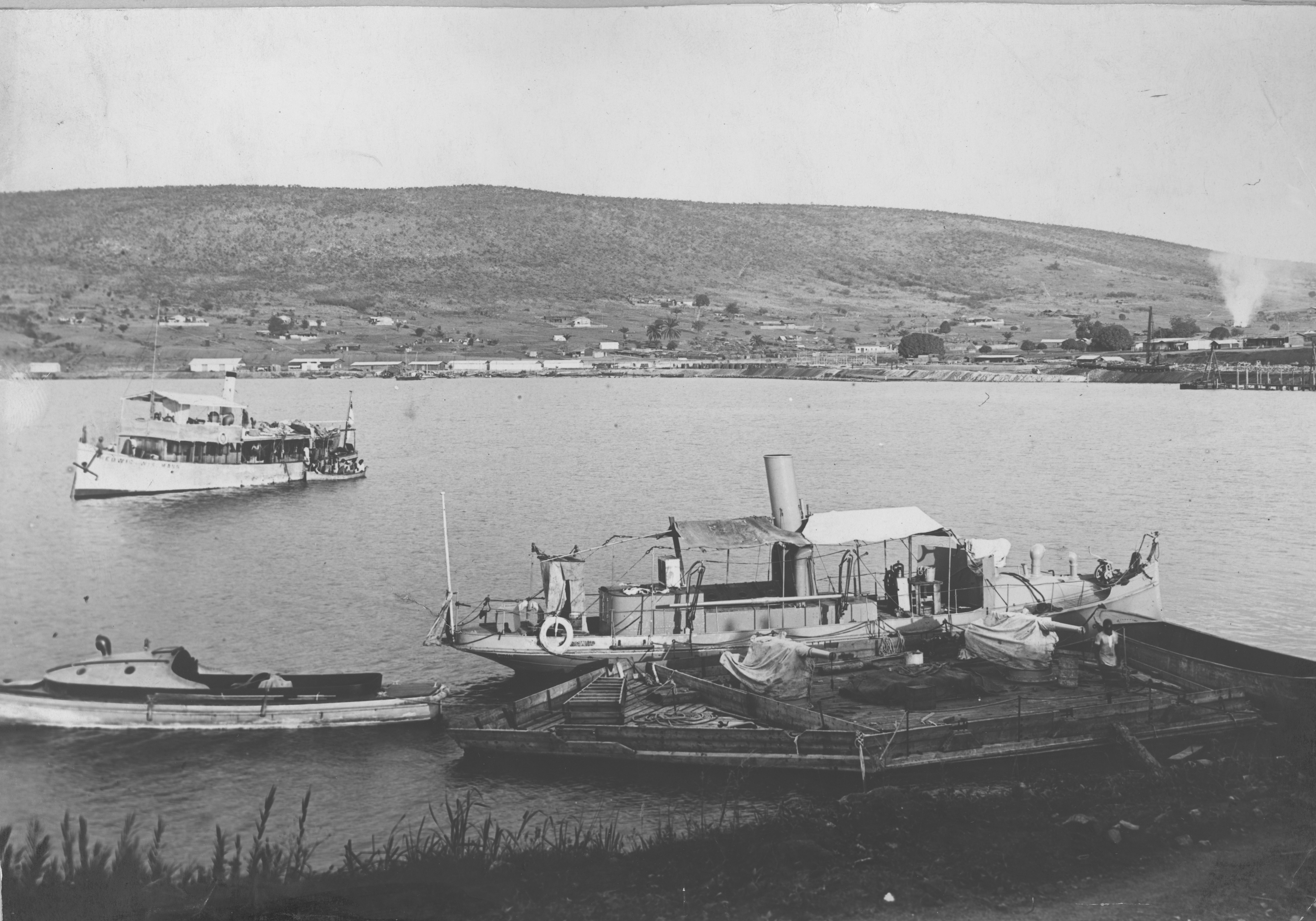
Lake Tanganyika in central Africa, contested by Great Britain, Belgium and Germany.

- Battle for Lake Tanganyika – German warship Kingani, on patrol in Lake Tanganyika that separated Belgian Congo from German East Africa, ran a reconnaissance mission on the lake port of Kalemie on the Belgian side of the great African lake.
- A mob of soldiers vandalized the German Club in Sydney, Australia by throwing stones and breaking every facade window of the club. Police broke up the mob shortly after, arresting one soldier and charging him with malicious damage and riotous behaviour.
- The 35th and 42nd Battalions of the First Australian Imperial Force were established for the Gallipoli campaign, but became part of the Western Front when Allied force withdrew early 1916 from the Turkish coast.
- The 1st and 2nd Composite Mounted Brigades of the British Army were disbanded.
- The 35th and 36th Brigades of the British Indian Army were established for the Mesopotamian campaign.
- Funakawa Light Railway extended the Oga Line in the Akita Prefecture, Japan, with station Hadachi serving the line.
- The Fyling Hall railway station was closed as part of the wartime measure in Fylingthorpe, England.
- Died:
  - Stuart Merrill, 52, American poet, known for his Symbolist poetry in French, author of Les Gammes, Les Fastes, and Petits Poèmes d'Automne (b. 1863)
  - Henry Hart, 77, African American entertainer and composer, leading composer and performer of minstrel shows in Indianapolis (b. 1839)

== December 2, 1915 (Thursday) ==
- Fourth Battle of the Isonzo – Cold winter began interfering with supplies to the front lines, forcing the battle between Italy and Austria-Hungary to wane to minor skirmishes throughout the rest of the month. Italian forces suffered 49,500 casualties including 7,500 dead, while Austro-Hungarian forces had 32,100 casualties including 4,000 dead.
- Battle for Lake Tanganyika – Lieutenant Job Rosenthal, commander of the German warship Kingani, on patrol in Lake Tanganyika was caught on shore while gathering intelligence on Allied defenses on the lake port of Kalemie, Belgian Congo. He was able to smuggle out a letter warning command in German East Africa of mounting Allied action around the African lake but it took months to reach his superiors.
- The college athletics organization Pacific Coast Conference was established with four charter members from University of California, Berkeley, University of Washington, University of Oregon, and Oregon Agricultural College (now Oregon State University). The conference was disbanded in 1959.
- The operetta Katinka, composed by Rudolf Friml, premiered in Morristown, New Jersey before appearing at the 44th Street Theatre on Broadway on December 23.
- The City of Henley and Grange was established in South Australia, Australia. It amalgamated with the City of Charles Sturt in 1997.
- Born:
  - Prince Takahito of Mikasa, Japanese noble, younger brother of Hirohito, last surviving paternal uncle of Emperor Akihito; in Tokyo, Empire of Japan (present-day Japan) (d. 2016)
  - Marais Viljoen, South African state leader, fifth and last State President of South Africa; in Robertson, Western Cape, South Africa (d. 2007)
  - Jane Marsh Beveridge, Canadian filmmaker, member of the National Film Board of Canada, known for her short documentaries on women serving in World War II including Women Are Warriors and Proudly She Marches; as Jane Smart, in Ottawa, Canada (d. 1998)
- Died: Edward R. Bacon, 67, American railroad executive, president of the Baltimore and Ohio Southwestern Railroad; died of complications after an appendicitis operation (b. 1848)

== December 3, 1915 (Friday) ==
- A magnitude 6.5 earthquake struck the border of Bhutan and Arunachal Pradesh, India, killing 170 people and destroying many homes.
- British Indian forces under Major-General Charles Townshend arrived at Kut, located on the Tigris in what is now eastern Iraq. Since the Battle of Ctesiphon weeks earlier, the army had been reduced to a third of its strength and 400 miles deep into Ottoman territory.
- Senussi campaign – The British garrison at Matruh, North Africa was increased by 1,400 men, and equipped with several guns from the Royal Marine Artillery, and two aircraft from the Royal Flying Corps as a means to deal with the growing Senussi insurgency.
- High winds toppled the Owen's electric light tower in San Jose, California, which was already structurally weak from another wind storm in February. Fortunately, there were no injuries from the collapse. The debris was hauled away at a cost of $4,000 for the city.
- Born: Charley Wensloff, American baseball player, pitcher for the New York Yankees and Cleveland Indians from 1943 to 1948, 1947 World Series champion; as Charles William Wensloff, in Sausalito, California, United States (d. 2001)

== December 4, 1915 (Saturday) ==
- Kosovo Offensive – The Central Powers captured Debar in Serbia (now part of North Macedonia), officially ending the offensive. The Serbian army lost 30,000 soldiers, 199 guns, 150 vehicles and various other equipment. The remaining Serbian army was transported to the Greek island of Corfu where thousands more died from exhaustion and other health complications related to the retreat.
- The Panama–Pacific International Exposition officially closed in San Francisco, after receiving close to 19 million visitors over ten months, including 450,000 visitors on its closing day.
- The Son of Tarzan, the fourth Tarzan novel by Edgar Rice Burroughs, began serial publication in the magazine All-Story Weekly. It would be published in book form in 1917.
- Born: Johnny Lombardi, Canadian television personality, best known for promoting multicultural community TV programming, recipient of the Order of Canada; in Toronto, Canada (d. 2002)

== December 5, 1915 (Sunday) ==
- Costa Rica held mid-term parliamentary elections, with the Republican Party of Costa Rica receiving two-thirds of the vote, in which just over half of the eligible electorate voted.
- French submarine Fresnel was scuttled after running aground on the Bojana river that fed into the Adriatic Sea. Austro-Hungarian naval destroyer Warasdiner completed the destruction of the ship and took the French crew prisoner.
- Imperial Trans-Antarctic Expedition – The shipwreck camp the polar exploration party set up following the sinking of the polar exploration ship Endurance drifted northward on the ice, reducing the choice of Antarctic islands the crew would make landing to one: Paulet Island.
- The Sunshine Special luxury passenger train service made its inaugural run on the St. Louis, Iron Mountain and Southern Railway.
- Died: Thomas Parker, 71, English engineer, known for his advances in battery technology and the invention of coalite; died of a brain tumor (b. 1843)

== December 6, 1915 (Monday) ==
- Battle of Kosturino – The Second Bulgarian Army under General Georgi Todorov began an assault on British and French defenses at Kosturino in what was part of Serbian controlled Macedonia.
- The second of the Chantilly Conferences for the Allied military organizations was held to formulate a coordinated strategy for the upcoming year against the Central Powers.
- Laurel Run mine fire – An underground coal mine fire near the communities of Laurel Run and Georgetown, in Luzerne County, Pennsylvania started when a miner accidentally left a carbide lamp hanging from a timber support before leaving for the weekend, causing it to ignite. Workers returning the following week discovered the fire and tried to extinguish it by blocking off its air supply by pouring sand in the area and filling the openings of the mine with concrete. However, the fire persisted and spread, continuing to burn well into the 21st-century.
- The 123rd Battalion of the Canadian Expeditionary Force was established.
- Born: Wacław Micuta, Polish partisan fighter and economist, one of the leaders in the Warsaw Uprising against Nazi occupation in 1944, member of the United Nations Economic Commission for Europe; in Petrograd, Russian Empire (present-day Saint Petersburg, Russia) (d. 2008)

== December 7, 1915 (Tuesday) ==
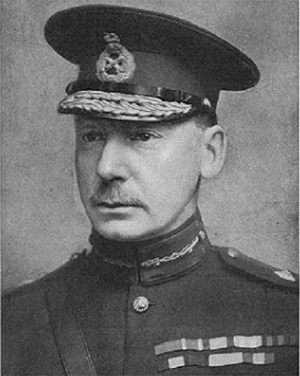
Major-General Charles Townshend, commander of British forces in Mesopotamia.

- Gallipoli campaign – Allied forces began to withdraw from Gallipoli in gradual waves in order to not tip off the Ottomans. In many cases, rifles were rigged to self-fire to disguise the departure, based on a design put forth by Australian soldier William Scurry.
- Siege of Kut – Major-General Charles Townshend chose the 6th Division of the British Indian Army to make a stand against an Ottoman force of 11,000 men at Kut 100 miles south of Baghdad rather than retreat further south to Basra, allowing the Ottomans to reinforce their siege while making it harder for the British to send reinforcements.
- Battle of Kosturino – The Bulgarian army launched a bayonet attack on British defenders at Kosturino using the cover of fog. Both British and French soldiers regrouped to repel the attack.
- U.S. President Woodrow Wilson delivered his State of the Union Address to the 64th United States Congress. While the United States was still neutral during World War I, Wilson emphasized the larger role the country could play on the international stage: "The moral is, that the states of America are not hostile rivals but cooperating friends, and that their growing sense of community or interest, alike in matters political and in matters economic, is likely to give them a new significance as factors in international affairs and in the political history of the world."
- The 33rd Indian Brigade was disbanded and replaced with the 34th Indian Brigade during the Mesopotamian campaign.
- The German Club in Sydney, Australia applied to renew its licensing to reopen after repairs were made to damages caused by a mob of soldiers on-leave at the start of the month, but the licensing court refused to entertain renewals until after the war, resulting in the club eventually shutting down.
- Born:
  - Eli Wallach, American actor, best known for roles in films Baby Doll, The Magnificent Seven and The Good, the Bad and the Ugly; in New York City, United States (d. 2014)
  - Leigh Brackett, American author and screenwriter, author of the screenplays The Big Sleep, Rio Bravo and The Empire Strikes Back, credited for developing the space opera novel; in Los Angeles, United States (d. 1978)
  - Lorna Arnold, British historian, noted expert on the British nuclear weapons programmes, author of Britain, Australia and the Bomb; as Lorna Margaret Rainbow, in Harlesden, England (d. 2014)
  - Johnny Gee, American baseball player, pitcher for the Pittsburgh Pirates and New York Giants from 1939 to 1946; as John Alexander Gee Jr., in Syracuse, New York, United States (d. 1988)

== December 8, 1915 (Wednesday) ==
- Battle of Kosturino – The Bulgarians broke through the British-French lines and captured 10 artillery guns.
- Siege of Mora – British soldiers burned an African village that had been supplying food supplies to German defenders at Mora in Kamerun in a means to starve German troops and force them to surrender.
- Canadian medical soldier John McCrae published his war poem "In Flanders Fields" anonymously in Punch after it had been rejected by The Spectator, but Punch attributed the poem to McCrea in its year-end index.
- Finnish composer Jean Sibelius premiered his Symphony No. 5 with the Helsinki Philharmonic Orchestra at a concert held on his 50th birthday.
- The Saku Railway opened stations Onara and Nakasato to serve the Ōito rail line in the Nagano Prefecture, Japan.
- Born:
  - Ernest Lehman, American screenwriter, known for his scripts for The Sound of Music and West Side Story, six-time Academy Award nominee, recipient of the Academy Honorary Award; in New York City, United States (d. 2005)
  - Frederick Ralph Sharp, Canadian air force officer, Chief of the Defence Staff for Canada from 1969 to 1972; in Moosomin, Saskatchewan, Canada (d. 1992)

== December 9, 1915 (Thursday) ==
- Battle of Kosturino – The French repulsed an attack that left 400 Bulgarian soldiers dead before regrouping at Bajimia.
- British cargo ship Orteric was torpedoed and sunk in the Mediterranean Sea 140 nautical miles (260 km) southeast of Gavdos, Greece by German submarine SM U-39 with the loss of two crew.
- The French tested the Breton-Prétot machine on the former battlefield of Souain, France. The machine was designed to maneuver over trenches and shell craters while cutting through barbed wire.
- Born: Elisabeth Schwarzkopf, German-British opera singer, best known for her performance work with the Royal Opera House in London, especially the role of the Marschallin in the Richard Strauss opera Der Rosenkavalier; as Olga Maria Elisabeth Friederike Schwarzkopf, in Jarotschin, Kingdom of Prussia, German Empire (present-day Jarocin, Poland) (d. 2006)
- Died: Hans Gross, 67, Austrian criminologist, developed offender profiling (b. 1847)

== December 10, 1915 (Friday) ==
- The Nobel Prize Committee selected British physicists William Henry Bragg and son Lawrence Bragg as recipients for the Nobel Prize in Physics. It was the first and only time two members of the same family received the prize, with Lawrence also being the youngest person ever to receive it. Also awarded was German chemist Richard Willstätter for the Nobel Prize in Chemistry and French author Romain Rolland for the Nobel Prize in Literature.
- The 1 millionth Ford car rolled off the assembly line at the River Rouge Plant in Detroit.
- Russian naval destroyers sank two Ottoman gunboats in the Black Sea while they were on a salvaging mission to recover German U-boat SM U-13 in what became known as the Battle of Kirpen Island.
- Born:
  - Nicky Barr, New Zealand-Australian air force officer, commander of the No. 23 and No. 3 Squadrons during World War II, recipient of the Order of the British Empire, Military Cross, and Distinguished Flying Cross; as Andrew William Barr, in Wellington, New Zealand (d. 2006)
  - John Dale Ryan, American air force officer, Chief of Staff of the United States Air Force from 1969 to 1973; in Cherokee, Iowa, United States (d. 1983)

== December 11, 1915 (Saturday) ==
- Field Marshall John French was appointed Command-in-Chief of Home Forces in Great Britain and dissolved the Third Army from being a central reserve to a coastal defense force.
- Battle of Kosturino – The Bulgarian army captured the city of Bogdanci in Serbian-controlled Macedonia.
- Senussi campaign – An Allied armored column on patrol in the Sahara were attacked by 300 Senussi tribesmen. With superior firepower and reinforcements from artillery and an Australian cavalry repelled the attack, killing 80 Senussi soldiers. Allied casualties were light.
- Born: Madhukar Dattatraya Deoras, Indian political leader, third leader of the Rashtriya Swayamsevak Sangh Hindu nationalist organization; in Nagpur, British India (present-day India) (d. 1996)

== December 12, 1915 (Sunday) ==
- President of the Republic of China Yuan Shikai declared himself Emperor.
- Battle of Kosturino – British and French forces retreat over the Greece border, ending the battle. The British suffered 1,209 casualties while the French sustained 1,804. Bulgarian casualties were estimated to be higher but no firm estimates could be obtained. Even so, the captured Serbian territory allowed the Central Powers to run a direct rail line from Berlin to Constantinople.
- Senussi campaign – A British column pursued but failed to capture retreating Senussi that attacked them the previous day, returning to the garrison in Matruh with casualties of 25 dead and 65 wounded. The Senussi suffered a further 17 killed and 30 wounded during the pursuit.
- German destroyer SMS V107 struck a mine and sank in the Baltic Sea off Liepāja, Latvia with the loss of a crew member.
- German pilot Theodor Mallinckrodt made the initial short flight of the world's first practical all-metal aircraft, the Junkers J 1 at Döberitz, Germany.
- Born:
  - Frank Sinatra, American singer and actor, one of the best-selling music artists of all time with 150 million records sold, also known for acclaimed film roles such as From Here to Eternity and The Manchurian Candidate, headed the noteworthy "Rat Pack"; as Francis Albert Sinatra, in Hoboken, New Jersey, United States (d. 1998)
  - Reizo Koike, Japanese swimmer, silver medalist at the 1932 Summer Olympics and bronze medalist at the 1936 Summer Olympics; in Numazu, Empire of Japan (present-day Japan) (d. 1998)
- Died:
  - Abraham Jefferson Seay, 83, American politician, second Governor of Oklahoma Territory (b. 1832)
  - Robert White, 82, American politician, 8th Attorney General of West Virginia (b. 1833)

== December 13, 1915 (Monday) ==
- A municipal election was held in Edmonton, Alberta, with William Thomas Henry re-elected by acclamation as mayor while five new aldermen were elected to vacancies on the 10-seat city council.
- The Cecil B. DeMille directed drama The Cheat was released, starring Fannie Ward, Sessue Hayakawa, and Jack Dean, Ward's real-life husband. The film was controversial among Japanese Americans for its leading Japanese character being portrayed as a sinister villain and was consequently not shown in Great Britain or Japan.
- Born:
  - Ross Macdonald, American-Canadian crime fiction writer, best known for the Lew Archer series; as Kenneth Millar, in Los Gatos, California, United States (d. 1983)
  - Curd Jürgens, Austrian-German film actor, known for roles in The Longest Day and The Spy Who Loved Me; in Solln, German Empire (present-day Germany) (d. 1982)
  - John Vorster, South African politician, Prime Minister of South Africa from 1966 to 1978; as Balthazar Johannes Vorster, in Uitenhage, Cape Province, South Africa (d. 1983)
  - Paul Hume, American journalist, music editor for The Washington Post; in Chicago, United States (d. 2001)

== December 14, 1915 (Tuesday) ==
- The Thunder Bay Amateur Hockey Association was established, becoming Hockey Northwestern Ontario in 1999 as the sports organizations became more regional.
- Born:
  - José Toribio Merino, Chilean naval officer, Commander-in-chief of the Chilean Navy, one of the principal leaders in the 1973 Chilean coup d'état that allowed Augusto Pinochet to take power; in La Serena, Chile (d. 1996)
  - Dan Dailey, American actor and singer, known for musical leading roles such as There's No Business Like Show Business; as Daniel James Dailey Jr., in New York City, United States (d. 1978)
- Died:
  - Lauaki Namulauulu Mamoe, Samoan noble, founder of the Mau movement in Samoa (date of birth unknown)
  - Eva Gouel, 30, French choreographer and girlfriend of Pablo Picasso; died of tuberculosis

== December 15, 1915 (Wednesday) ==
- William John Bowser became Premier of British Columbia, replacing Richard McBride.
- The Roman Catholic Diocese of Caratinga was established in Caratinga, Brazil.
- The Tarong railway line opened between Tarong and Kingaroy, Queensland, Australia.
- Born: Kenshiro Abbe, Japanese martial artist, founder of the Kyūshindō philosophy for judo, introduced aikido in Great Britain; in Tokushima Prefecture, Empire of Japan (present-day Japan) (d. 1985)
- Died: Richard Webster, 72, British judge, fourth Lord Chief Justice of England and Wales (b. 1842)

== December 16, 1915 (Thursday) ==
- William Kissam Vanderbilt was found to be in violation of antitrust laws in the United States because the New York Central Railroad owned a controlling interest in the Nickel Plate Road, both of which Vanderbilt owned.
- Ship manufacturer Öresundsvarvet was established in Landskrona, Sweden. Their first ship was launched in 1918. After decades as leading manufacturer of oil tankers, the company declined in the 1970s and the last ship was launched in 1982.
- The Sumner Library opened thanks to Carnegie funding in Minneapolis. Within a month, the building was deemed too small to meet the public demand.

== December 17, 1915 (Friday) ==
- The St Bedes Junction rail crash in England killed 19 people.
- German cruiser SMS Bremen struck a mine and sank in the Baltic Sea off Ventspils, Lithuania.
- British gunboat HMS Cricket was launched at Barclay Curle at Glasgow for service in the Middle East.
- The Handley Page Type O bomber was first flown at Hendon Aerodrome near London and would go into major service in 1916.
- Born:
  - Robert A. Dahl, American political scientist, author of Who Governs? which introduced the concept of pluralist democracy; in Inwood, Iowa, United States (d. 2014)
  - Henry Wallace McLeod, Canadian air force officer, commander of the No. 443 Squadron during World War II, recipient of the Distinguished Service Order and Distinguished Flying Cross; in Regina, Canada (killed in action, 1944)

== December 18, 1915 (Saturday) ==
- U.S. President Woodrow Wilson married Edith Bolling Galt in Washington, D.C.
- Charlie Chaplin's thirteenth and final film for Essanay Studios, A Burlesque on Carmen, was released. The film was a parody of the overacted film Carmen by Cecil B. DeMille which was itself an interpretation of the popular novella Carmen by Prosper Mérimée.
- Born:
  - Dario Mangiarotti, Italian fencer, three-time Olympic medalist including silver at the 1948 Summer Olympics and gold and silver at the 1952 Summer Olympics; in Milan, Kingdom of Italy (present-day Italy) (d. 2010)
  - Vivian Bullwinkel, Australian army nurse, survivor of the Bangka Island massacre in 1942, recipient of the Order of Australia and Order of the British Empire; in Kapunda, Australia (d. 2000)
- Died: Fred D. Shepard, 60, American physician, one of the key eyewitnesses to the Armenian genocide; died of typhus (b. 1855)

== December 19, 1915 (Sunday) ==
- Greek Liberal Party leader Eleftherios Venizelos and his caucus boycotted the legislative election held in Greece following Greek monarch King Constantine calling for new elections. The Liberal Party, which won a majority in legislative elections held in May, publicly opposed Constantine's advocacy that Greece remain neutral during World War I. As a result, only conservative parties ran and were elected to a majority of the seats in the legislature. Continual conflict between the Greek Liberals and the monarchy led to a crisis later in 1916 known as the National Schism.
- The Germans launched a gas attack against the British near Ypres, Belgium, using a mix of chlorine and phosgene. Around 1,069 British troops were gassed, mostly from the 49th Infantry Division.
- Douglas Haig replaced John French as commander of the British Expeditionary Force.
- Captain M.M. Bell-Irving of the No.1 Squadron, Royal Flying Corps, achieved the first aerial victory by a Canadian when he shot down a German aircraft.
- Kazimir Malevich staged the 0,10 Exhibition and introduced Suprematism to the art public.
- Born: Édith Piaf, French singer, best known for international French-language hits including "La Vie en rose" and "Non, je ne regrette rien"; as Édith Giovanna Gassion, in Paris, France (d. 1963)
- Died:
  - Alois Alzheimer, 51, German psychiatrist and neuroscientist, identified the first published case of "presenile dementia", later known as Alzheimer's disease; died of heart failure (b. 1864)
  - Arthur Williams Wright, 79, American physicist, leading researcher in X-ray imaging (b. 1836)

== December 20, 1915 (Monday) ==
- Gallipoli campaign – The Australian and New Zealand Army Corps (ANZAC) completed their evacuation from ANZAC Cove and Suvla Bay before dawn.
- The U.S. Supreme Court released decisions on two federal cases:
  - Due process for decisions or acts affecting a large number of people equally are impractical and therefore unnecessary, therefore upholding a decision by the Colorado Supreme Court to dismiss a suit against a property tax increase.
  - The state has legitimate police power to regulated local ordinance through zoning, upholding the decision by the Supreme Court of California.
- The Roman Catholic Diocese of Porto Nacional was established in Porto Nacional, Brazil.
- Born: Noël Browne, Irish politician, cabinet minister for the Seán T. O'Kelly administration; in Waterford Ireland (d. 1997)
- Died: John T. Morrison, 54, American politician, 6th governor of Idaho (b. 1860)

== December 21, 1915 (Tuesday) ==
- Battle of Hartmannswillerkopf – French and German forces made one final battle for supremacy of the Hartmannswillerkopf peak in the Vosges mountain of the Alsace region that bordered France and Germany.
- British hospital ship SS Huntly, formerly the German hospital ship Ophelia, was torpedoed and sunk in the English Channel by German submarine SM UB-10 with the loss of two of her crew.
- Imperial Trans-Antarctic Expedition – Polar expedition leader Ernest Shackleton ordered a second march to Paulet Island off the main coast of Antarctica.
- The Zeppelin LZ 59 airship made its maiden flight from Friedrichshafen, Germany to participate in bombing raids for the Imperial German Navy.
- The association football organization Cantabrian Federation of Football Clubs (now the Royal Football Federation of the Principality of Asturias) was formed with official backing from the Royal Spanish Football Federation to oversee football clubs in Asturias, Spain.
- Born: Werner von Trapp, member of the Trapp Family Singers; in Zell am See, Austria-Hungary (present-day Austria) (d. 2007)

== December 22, 1915 (Wednesday) ==
- Battle of Hartmannswillerkopf – The battle for domination of the Hartmannswillerkopf peak in the Vosges mountain of the Alsace region ended indecisively. The cost of the campaign was enormous for both sides, with 30,000 recorded casualties (the majority for the French side).
- Battle for Lake Tanganyika – British motor boats HMS Mimi and Toutou were launched from the lake port of Kalemie, Belgian Congo onto Lake Tanganyika.
- The Prince Edward Island Highlanders battalion was mobilized with the Canadian Expeditionary Force during World War I.
- Born: Barbara Billingsley, American actress, best known as June Cleaver on the 1950s TV series Leave It to Beaver and its 1980s sequel Still the Beaver; as Barbara Lillian Combes, in Los Angeles, United States (d. 2010)

== December 23, 1915 (Thursday) ==
- General elections were held in Luxembourg, with the Party of the Right winning nearly half of the 52 seats in the Chamber of Deputies.
- HMHS Britannic departed from Liverpool on her maiden voyage as a hospital ship.
- Imperial Trans-Antarctic Expedition – The shipwrecked expedition party of the polar exploration ship Endurance began their second march to Paulet Island off the main coast of Antarctica. Despite the warmer summer months, the melting snow caused men and lifeboats to sink, making the trek slow-going.
- The musical Very Good Eddie, by Guy Bolton and Philip Bartholomae with music by Jerome Kern and lyrics by Schuyler Green and Herbert Reynolds, was the second show to premier at Princess Theatre in New York City. The show was a hit, running for 341 performances and leading to further successful collaborations between Bolton and Kern.
- The town of Little Italy, Arkansas was established.
- Born: Jean Brooks, American actress, noted for starring genre films including The Leopard Man and The Seventh Victim; as Ruby Matilda Kelly, in Houston, United States (d. 1963)
- Died: Roland Leighton, 20, English war poet, his life and death in combat were commemorated in Vera Brittain's memoir, Testament of Youth; killed in action (b. 1895)

== December 24, 1915 (Friday) ==
- The Imperial Japanese Army established the 19th and 20th Infantry Divisions.
- The Dumbarton Bridge in Washington, D.C. officially opened as the Q Street Bridge before changing to its official name the following year. The bridge was added to the National Register of Historic Places on July 16, 1973.
- The Pittsburgh Coal Company acquired the Monongahela River Consolidated Coal and Coke Company in Pittsburgh.
- The first edition of The All British newspaper was published in Perth to promote anti-German sentiments and other far-right conservative views of the All-British Association.
- Died: William J. Mills, 66, American politician, 19th and last Governor of New Mexico Territory (b. 1849)

== December 25, 1915 (Saturday) ==
- The National Protection War erupted in China.
- Senussi campaign – The main body of Senussi clashed with two Allied columns in the Sahara Desert resulting in a major defeat but not the knockout blow the Allies hoped for against the insurgency. About 300 Senussi tribesmen were killed and another 20 were captured. The Allies had 13 men killed and another 51 wounded.
- The Haguroshita Station opened to serve the Saku Railway in the Nagano Prefecture, Japan. As well, Akita Railways opened the Hanawa Line in the Akita Prefecture, with stations Suehiro, Osarizawa, Jūnisho, and Ōtaki-Onsen serving the line.
- The Irving Berlin musical Stop! Look! Listen! premiered Christmas Day on Broadway at the Globe Theatre in New York City, resulting in a run of 105 performances.
- The wartime opera Les cadeaux de Noël by French composer Xavier Leroux was first performed by the Opéra-Comique in Paris.
- The association football club Varzim was established in Póvoa de Varzim, Portugal.

== December 26, 1915 (Sunday) ==
- The Treaty of Darin was signed between Great Britain and Najd ruler Ibn Saud, who would become the founder and first monarch of Saudi Arabia. The treaty would recognize the House of Saud would be a British protectorate and would ally against the Ottoman Empire.
- Battle for Lake Tanganyika – The German warship Kingani was captured by the British following a battle with British boats HMS Mimi and Toutou on Lake Tanganyika near Kalemie, Belgian Congo. The smaller boats were faster and able to out-maneuver the larger German ship, causing enough hull damage to force the German crew to surrender.
- British submarine HMS E6 struck a mine and sank in the North Sea off Harwich, Essex, England with the loss of 31 of her crew.
- The Irish Republican Brotherhood Military Council decided to stage an Easter Rising in 1916.
- Actress Mary Boland made her screen debut in The Edge of the Abyss, directed by Walter Edwards (the film is now considered lost).

== December 27, 1915 (Monday) ==
- Imperial Trans-Antarctic Expedition – Expedition leader Ernest Shackleton faced rebellion in his ranks when ship carpenter Harry McNish refused to work, citing Ship's Articles had expired since the polar exploration ship Endurance sank in November and that he was no longer under orders. Shackleton was able to get the carpenter back in line, but the insubordination cost McNish the Polar Medal which he was not awarded based on Shackleton's recommendation.
- The 1st Australian Wireless Signal Squadron of the First Australian Imperial Force was established to support communications during the Mesopotamian campaign.
- Born: William Masters, American physician, senior member of the Masters and Johnson sexual research team; in Cleveland, United States (d. 2001)

== December 28, 1915 (Tuesday) ==
- Gallipoli campaign – Allied forces began to evacuate from Cape Helles on Gallipoli.
- Battle of Durazzo – An Austro-Hungarian naval squadron led by light cruiser SMS Helgoland headed towards Durazzo, Albania.
- Ross Sea party – Expedition leader Aeneas Mackintosh completed the first of the major supply depots on the Ross Ice Shelf for the Imperial Trans-Antarctic Expedition, starting at Minna Bluff before moving on to Mount Hope.
- Mayor James Rolph of San Francisco officially moved the Mayor's Office into the re-opened city hall that had been damaged in the 1906 earthquake.
- The prototype of the Lebed XII was first flown in Saint Petersburg but bad weather cut the test flight short.
- During a general meeting of the American Association for the Advancement of Science in Columbus, Ohio, 50 attending members voted to form the Ecological Society of America for professionals dedicated to the study and advocacy of ecology. The society has since grown to include 10,000 members worldwide.
- The Saku Railway opened rail stops Sandanda and Irisawa to serve the rail line in the Nagano Prefecture, Japan.

== December 29, 1915 (Wednesday) ==
- Battle of Durazzo – The Austro-Hungarian Navy shelled the port of Durazzo, Albania then retreated from French and British squadrons, losing destroyers SMS Lika and SMS Triglav in the process.
- French submarine Monge was sunk in the Adriatic Sea off Kotor, Austria-Hungary by Austro-Hungarian Navy cruiser SMS Helgoland.
- Imperial Trans-Antarctic Expedition – Due to deteriorating ice conditions, expedition leader Ernest Shackleton called off the march to Paulet Island and ordered the party to set up a new camp on the open ice. It was now two months since they abandoned the Endurance and the camp would be home for another three months.
- The Jōbu Railway extended the Chichibu Main Line in Saitama Prefecture, Japan, with station Kunikami serving the line.
- The children's play The Starlight Express, with songs and music composed by Edward Elgar, premiered at Kingsway Theatre in London for a month-long run.
- The town and municipality of Embarcación in Salta Province, Argentina was established.
- Born: Jo Van Fleet, American actress, recipient of the Academy Award for Best Supporting Actress for her film debut in East of Eden and a Tony Award for Best Featured Actress in a Play for her lead role in Broadway hit The Trip to Bountiful; as Catherine Josephine Van Fleet, in Oakland, California, United States (d. 1996)
- Died: Tom Shevlin, 32, American football player and coach, named All-American player with the Yale Bulldogs football team, assistant coach for Yale and the Minnesota Golden Gophers football team (b. 1883)

== December 30, 1915 (Thursday) ==
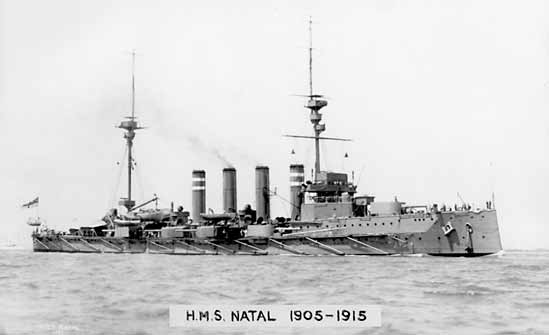
HMS Natal

- British armored cruiser HMS Natal capsized at anchor in the Cromarty Firth as the result of an internal explosion in her ammunition stores, killing 390 sailors and some civilians.
- British passenger ship Persia was torpedoed and sunk in the Mediterranean Sea off Crete by German submarine SM U-38 with the loss of 343 of the 519 people on board.
- Senussi Campaign – An Allied desert column completed a two-day reconnaissance in the Egyptian interior. A camp of Bedouin warriors evacuated in disorder when the column was spotted, leaving behind 80 destroyed tents and 100 camels and 600 sheep. The loss of food and shelter forced local Bedouin into acquiescence.
- The "new" German 8th Army was formed using Army of the Niemen under command of General Otto von Below.
- The first Schuckert airplanes were delivered to Döberitz, Germany for military service.
- The World's Court League was established with American diplomat John Hays Hammond as president. The organization was instrumental in advocating for the creation of the International Court of Justice.
- Born:
  - Rea Leakey, British army officer, commander of the 5th Royal Tank Regiment during World War II, recipient of Order of the Bath, Military Cross, Distinguished Service Order, War Cross; as Arundell Rea Leakey, in Nairobi, Kenya (d. 1999)
  - Victor Maghakian, American marine corps officer, commander of the Marine Raiders during World War II, two-time recipient of the Silver Star, Bronze Star and Navy Cross; in Chicago, United States (d. 1977)

== December 31, 1915 (Friday) ==
- The National Council for Geographic Education was established at state normal school in Mankato, Minnesota.
- The Mathematical Association of America was established in Washington, D.C.
- The Great Northern Railway closed the Manchester Road railway station in Bradford, England.
- Born: Neil Paterson, Scottish screenwriter, recipient of the Academy Award for Best Adapted Screenplay for Room at the Top; as James Edmund Neil Paterson, in Greenock, Scotland (d. 1995)
- Died:
  - Winfield Scott Hammond, 52, American politician, 18th Governor of Minnesota; died of a stroke (b. 1863)
  - Tip O'Neill, 55, Canadian baseball player, left fielder for the teams including the St. Louis Browns from 1882 to 1892, Triple Crown champion for 1887 (b. 1858)
