= Battle of Kargabazar =

World War I battle between Russia and Ottoman Empire

- Part of the Erzurum offensive of the Caucasus campaign
Date	January 18–19, 1916
Location	Kargabazar Mountains, Ottoman Empire
Result	Russian tactical victory

Belligerents
Russian Empire	Ottoman Empire

Commanders and leaders
Nikolai Yudenich (Note: Army commander); Vladimir Liakhov (Note: 13th and 15th Caucasian Rifle Regiments)	Abdul Kerim Paşa (Note: Third Army Commander)

Units involved
13th Caucasian Rifle Regiment; 15th Caucasian Rifle Regiment	30th Division (X Corps)

Strength
~17,000 (Note: Total force of the 4th Caucasian Rifle Division and supporting columns assigned to X Corps sector)	~20,000 (Note: Total strength of the Ottoman X Corps)

Casualties and losses
Unknown	Significant; Ottomans retreated in panic

The Battle of Kargabazar (or the Battle of Kargabazar-dağ) was a military engagement fought on January 18–19, 1916, during the Caucasus campaign of World War I. The battle resulted in a Russian victory, allowing the Russian Empire to turn the entire northern defensive line of the Erzurum fortress system.

== Background ==
Following the collapse of the Ottoman frontline at the Battle of Koprukoy, the commander of the Ottoman Third Army, Abdul Kerim Paşa, ordered the X Corps to withdraw to the fortified positions of the Gürcü-boğaz Pass. The success of this withdrawal was vital to maintaining the northern defense of Erzurum. However, General Nikolai Yudenich had concentrated forces specifically to intercept this withdrawal, deploying the 4th Caucasian Rifle Division toward the rear of the Ottoman positions.

== Battle ==
The key to the northern defense was the massive ridge of Kargabazar-dağ, which dominated the approaches to the Gürcü-boğaz Pass. The position was held by the Ottoman 30th Division.

On January 18, under heavy snow-storm conditions, the Russian right flanking column—composed of the 13th and 15th Caucasian Rifle Regiments under Colonel Lyakhov—began the ascent of the eastern slopes. Russian troops manually hauled mountain artillery up steep cliffs. The Ottoman defenders, believing the ridge to be impassable in such weather, were caught by surprise.

On the morning of January 19, the Russian riflemen launched a direct assault on the stone redoubts along the crest. By the afternoon, the Ottoman 30th Division retreated in panic toward the Dumlu valley.

== Aftermath ==
The fall of Kargabazar-dağ rendered the Gürcü-boğaz defensive line untenable, forcing the Ottoman X Corps to abandon their positions. While this was a major tactical success, Yudenich’s wider operational goal of encircling and cutting off the Ottoman Third Army was not achieved, as the Russian columns were unable to advance through the difficult mountain terrain quickly enough to seal the escape route.
