= Andrew Keith Jack =

Australian physicist

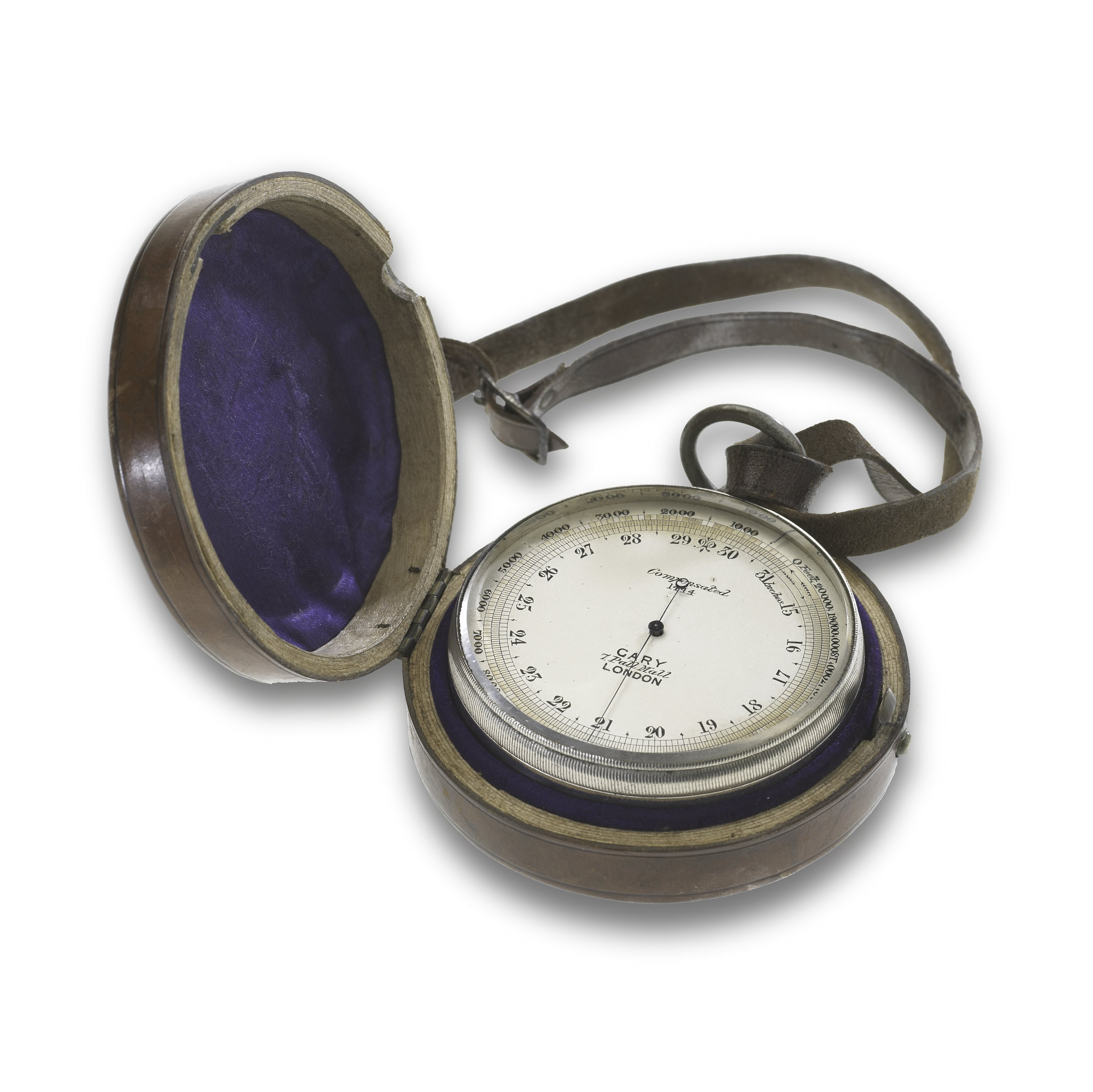
- Aneroid Barometer used by Keith Jack during Antarctic expedition
- Born: 9 September 1885; Melbourne, Australia
- Died: 26 September 1966 (aged 81)
- Education: University of Melbourne
- Occupation: Physicist

Andrew Keith Jack (9 September 1885 – 26 September 1966) was an Australian physicist who served as a member of the Ross Sea Party as part of Ernest Shackleton's Imperial Trans-Antarctic Expedition.

Jack was educated at the University of Melbourne, graduating with an MSc in 1914. A year later he joined the Shackleton expedition, where along with other members of the crew, he became stranded for 2 years in Antarctica after the loss of the ship Aurora. During this time he kept a regular diary across five volumes. Jack was rescued along with six other survivors in 1917. Jack also took many photographs during the expedition, some of which were later hand-coloured as lantern slides. Jack's diaries, as well as a number of his artefacts from the expedition, including his 1829 Aneroid barometer and a set of two thermometers, were bequeathed to the Museum Victoria.

After the expedition, Jack worked during the war in an explosives factory (known as the Cordite Factory), utilising his expertise in chemistry, eventually become a Senior Assistant Manager. After the war he took on various roles managing explosives and safety for the Australian Government.
