= The All British =

Newspaper in Perth, Western Australia, active 1916

- Ask your news agent for the "All British," and see that you get it.
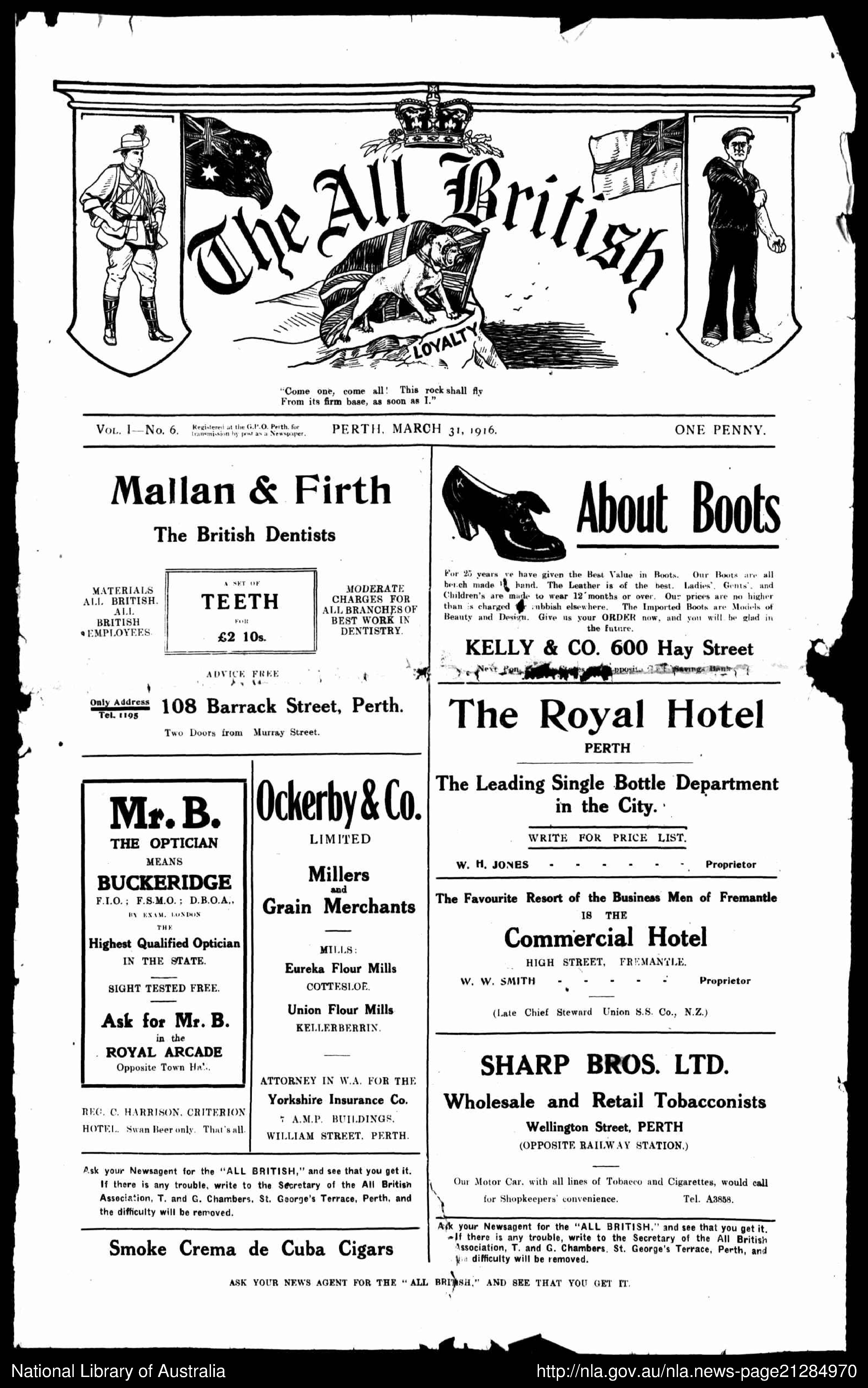
- Front page of The All British Vol. 1, No. 6.
- Publisher: All-British Association
- Founded: 24 December 1915
- Ceased publication: 1916
- Political alignment: Anti-German, Labor
- Language: English
- City: Perth
- Country: Australia

The All British is a defunct English language newspaper published in 1915–1916 in Perth, Western Australia by the All-British Association.

== History ==
The All-British Association was a xenophobic pressure group founded in 1915 by Peter Wedd, C.J.R LeMesurier and George Toll following the first major battle involving Australian troops. The group aimed to promote imperial sentiment and sought the internment of "alien enemies" within the local community. The views of this group were captured in a series of newspapers published between December 1915 and April 1916. The newspaper contains articles expressing political opinion on topics such as naturalization and business, accusations against local community members, information on All-British Association meetings as well as advertisements for local goods and services.

A libel case was raised against the All-British Association by a school teacher named Henry Gervase Shugg in response to an article entitled "German School Teachers" published in the first issue of The All British. The plaintiff was awarded £75 in damages. In the Supreme Court, the association sought to sever ties with The All British newspaper, stating that it had been formed independently by nine members of the association when the venture was deemed to be too expensive for the association to consider.

== Availability ==
Two issues of this newspaper (Vol. 1, No. 6 and No. 7) have been digitised as part of Australian Newspapers Digitisation Program, a project of the National Library of Australia in cooperation with the State Library of Western Australia.

Both of these issues are available in hard copy at the State Library of Western Australia.

== See also ==
- List of newspapers in Australia
- List of newspapers in Western Australia
