= 1916 Guatemalan presidential election =

- 17 January 1916
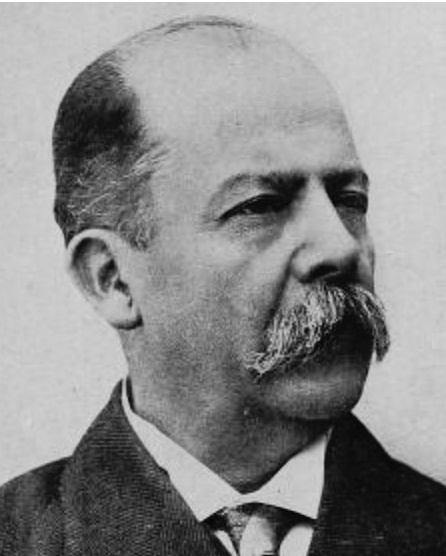
Nominee	Manuel Estrada Cabrera
Party	Liberal
Popular vote	415,052
Percentage	100%
President before election
Manuel Estrada Cabrera
Liberal
President-elect
Manuel Estrada Cabrera
Liberal

Presidential elections were held in Guatemala on 17 January 1916. For the second successive election, Manuel Estrada Cabrera was re-elected unopposed. Despite there only being one candidate, voters were rounded up by the military and taken to polling stations, where they could only vote for Cabrera. Cabrera assumed the presidency on 15 March 1911.

== Results ==
Candidate	Party	Votes	%
Manuel Estrada Cabrera	Liberal Party	415,052	100.00
Total		415,052	100.00
Source: Information Annual, 1916

== Bibliography ==
- Villagrán Kramer, Francisco. Biografía política de Guatemala: años de guerra y años de paz. FLACSO-Guatemala, 2004.
- González Davison, Fernando. El régimen Liberal en Guatemala (1871–1944). Guatemala: Universidad de San Carlos de Guatemala. 1987.
- Dosal, Paul J. Power in transition: the rise of Guatemala's industrial oligarchy, 1871–1994. Westport: Praeger. 1995.
- Holden, Robert H. Armies without nations: public violence and state formation in Central America, 1821–1960. New York: Oxford University Press. 2004.
- Taracena Arriola, Arturo. "Liberalismo y poder político en Centroamérica (1870–1929).” Historia general de Centroamérica . 1994. San José: FLACSO. Volume 4.
- Calvert, Peter. Guatemala : a nation in turmoil. Boulder: Westview Press. 1985.
- Rendón, Catherine. "El gobierno de Manuel Estrada Cabrera". Historia general de Guatemala. 1993–1999. Guatemala: Asociación de Amigos del País, Fundación para la Cultura y el Desarrollo. Volume 5. 1996.
