= Juana María Condesa Lluch =

Spanish religious sister and Blessed

Blessed Juana María Condesa Lluch
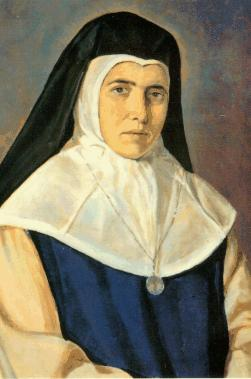
- image of 1956

Virgin
- Born: 30 March 1862; Valencia, Kingdom of Spain
- Died: 16 January 1916 (aged 53); Valencia, Kingdom of Spain
- Venerated in: Roman Catholic Church
- Beatified: 23 March 2003, Saint Peter's Square, Vatican City by Pope John Paul II
- Feast: 16 January

Juana María Condesa Lluch (30 March 1862 – 16 January 1916) was a Spanish religious sister who established the Handmaids of Mary Immaculate in her hometown of Valencia. She made her vows in 1911.

Lluch dedicated her life to the promotion of the rights of workers ever since her childhood when she first witnessed the terrible conditions of laborers. Her initiatives in Spain were aimed towards the workers and their families as a means of alleviating their burdens and championing their fundamental rights as individuals. Lluch provided material and spiritual support to workers across Valencia. Pope John Paul II presided over her beatification in Saint Peter's Square on 23 March 2003.

== Life ==
Juana María Condesa Lluch was born in Valencia on 30 March 1862 as the fourth child to Doctor Lluís Condesa and Joana Lluch; both were Third Order Carmelites. She received baptism on 31 March 1862 in the church of Saint Stephen. She later received her Confirmation in the same church in 1864.

Lluch received a good education during her childhood due to her life of wealth and her upbringing. She started her devotion to the Holy Eucharist, the Blessed Virgin Mary and Saint Joseph. She felt called to the religious life at the age of eighteen and saw the need to aid the workers who worked in de-humanizing conditions. She saw these conditions firsthand while in her coach passing workers. Around this time her spiritual director was Vicente Castañer.

Cardinal Antoín Monescillo – the Archbishop of Valencia – refused her request to establish a religious congregation and said that Lluch was not old enough to contemplate establishing a congregation. In 1884 she received approval to open a shelter to provide spiritual and material assistance to workers and their families. She also opened a school for their children around the same time on 25 March 1884; she founded a congregation in 1884 around that same period. Cardinal Ciriaco María Sancha y Hervás presented her with the religious habit on 10 December 1892. On 19 March 1895 she and the first sisters made their first vows. The congregation received diocesan approval on 1 July 1892 and brief papal approval from Pope Pius XI on 14 April 1937 while definitive papal approval came on 27 January 1947 from Pope Pius XII. Lluch made her perpetual vows on 8 September 1911. Lluch died in 1916.

== Beatification ==
The beatification process commenced under Pope Pius XII on 3 December 1953 in the informative process that granted her the title of Servant of God as the first official stage in the process. The process concluded its business of accumulating documents and interrogatories on 12 January 1956 while the process was validated in Rome decades later on 14 December 1984.

The positio came to the Congregation for the Causes of Saints in 1991 while consulting theologians in Rome approved the cause on 15 November 1996 and the Congregation voiced approval 18 March 1997. Lluch was declared venerable on 7 July 1997 after Pope John Paul II declared that she had lived a life of heroic virtue.

The required miracle – the prerequisite for beatification – was investigated in the diocese of its origin and received full validation from Roman officials on 12 November 1999. The pope approved it in 2002 and beatified Lluch on 23 March 2003.
