= Battle of Koprukoy =

World War I battle between Russia and Ottoman Empire

Battle of Köprüköy
- Part of the Erzurum offensive of the Caucasus campaign
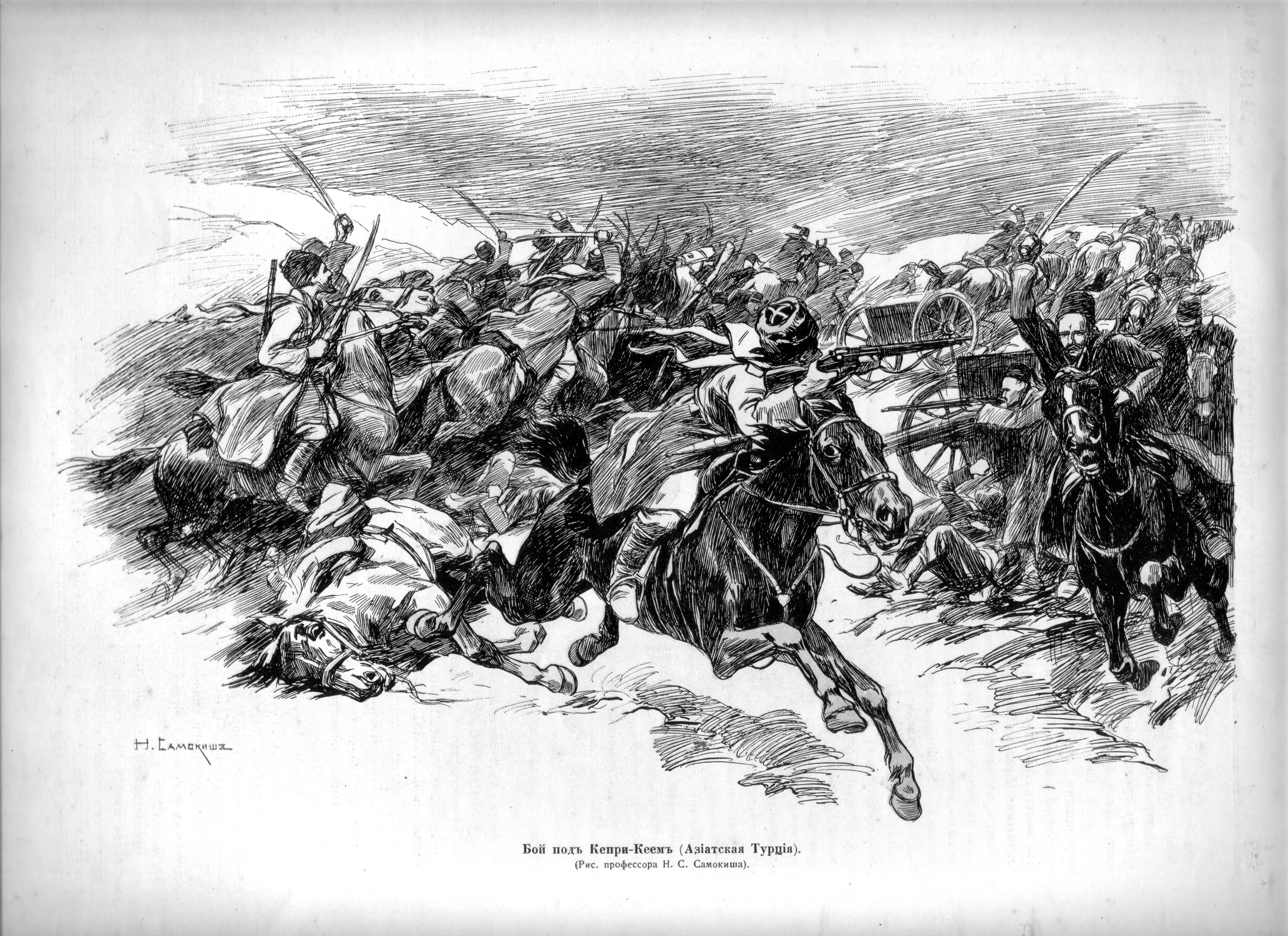
Date	10–19 January 1916
Location	Erzurum, Ottoman Empire
Result	Russian victory (Note: "The battle of Köprüköy was an important victory for the Caucasian army. The fortified front covering Erzurum had been broken and now the fortress of Erzurum could be attacked directly or besieged.")

Belligerents
Russian Empire	Ottoman Empire

Commanders and leaders
Nikolai Yudenich	Abdul Kerim Pasha; Halil Pasha

Strength
85,000	65,000

Casualties and losses
12,000	25,000

The Battle of Köprüköy was a major engagement of the Caucasus Campaign during World War I. Occurring between January 10 and 19, 1916, it resulted in a decisive victory for the Russian Empire and broke the Ottoman defensive lines protecting Erzurum.

== Background ==
The Ottoman Third Army's defensive front was divided into three distinct sectors. The central sector, considered the most critical, stretched from the Cakir-baba ridge to the Aras river south of Azapköy, covering the primary road to Erzurum through the Pasin valley.

The Russian command, led by Nikolai Yudenich, studied these positions in detail. While the Ottoman line was well-fortified with wire and artillery, it suffered from a critical lack of reserves to address a concentrated breakthrough.

== Battle ==
Yudenich opted to strike at the boundary between the northern and central sectors near the Cakir-baba ridge, positioning the 4th Caucasian Rifle Division to spearhead the offensive. Following a series of diversionary attacks on January 10 that forced the Ottoman command to misallocate the 17th Division, the main Russian assault began on January 14 near the Cakir-baba ridge.

Despite heavy snow and determined resistance, the Russian forces reached the point of breakthrough by January 15. The Siberian Cossacks were deployed to the sector to exploit the gaps in the line. Facing encirclement, Abdul Kerim Pasha ordered a general withdrawal on the night of January 16–17. The Siberian Cossacks successfully annihilated the Ottoman rear-guard, though the bulk of the Third Army managed to retreat to the Erzurum fortress system.

== Aftermath ==
The Ottoman Third Army suffered 25,000 total casualties (killed, wounded, and frozen), while Russian losses reached 12,000, including significant numbers of frostbite cases. The victory allowed Russia to threaten Erzurum directly, fundamentally altering the strategic situation in the Caucasus.
