= Mount Hope (Ross Dependency) =

Mountain in Ross Dependency, Antarctica

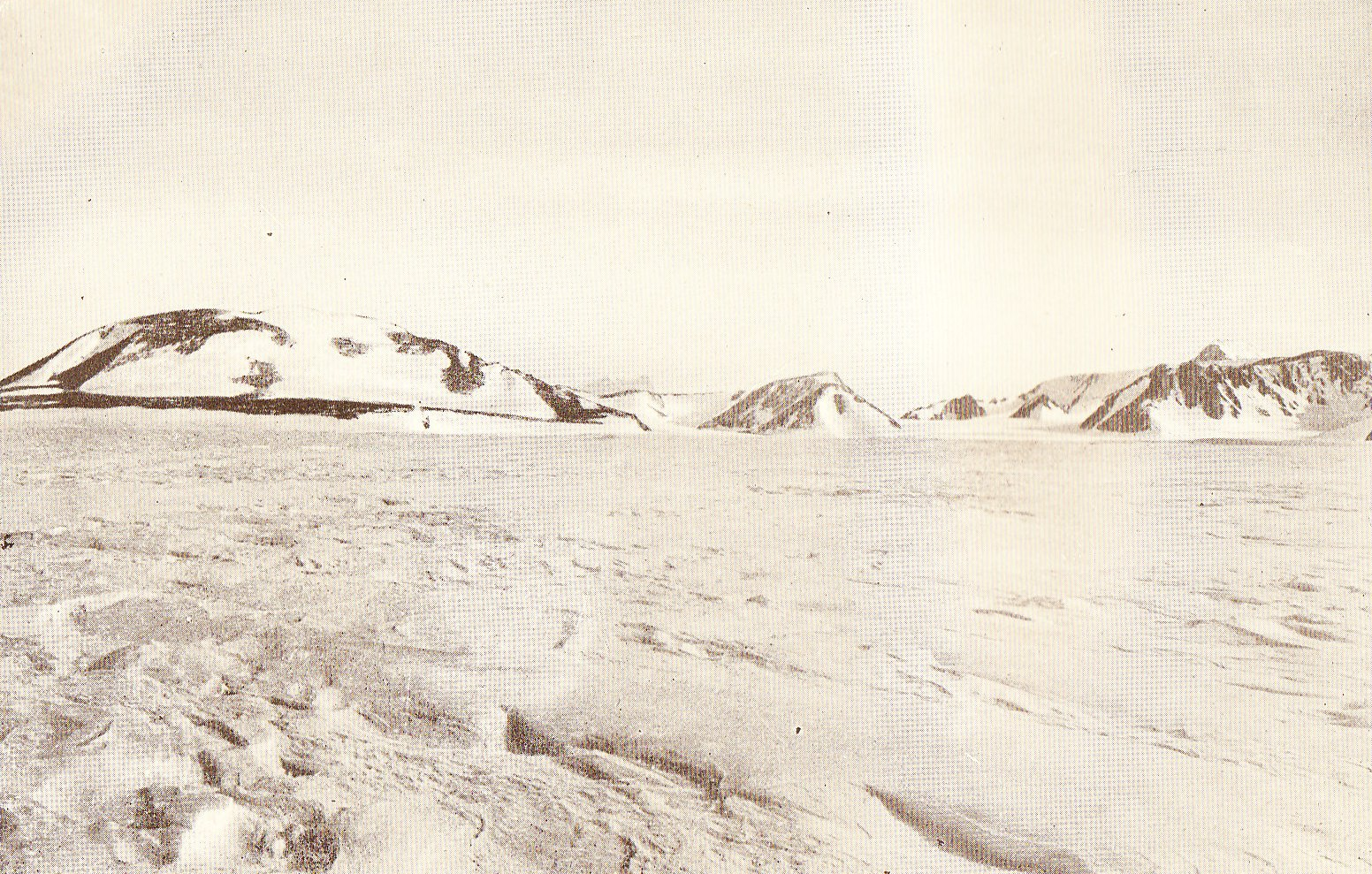
- Mount Hope, the dome-shaped hill on the left, photographed by Shackleton's party in December 1908

Highest point
- Elevation: approx. 835 metres (2,740 ft)

Geography
- Location within Antarctica
- Location: Antarctica; Ross Dependency
- Parent range: Transantarctic Mountains

Mount Hope is a dome-shaped hill, rising to approximately 835 metres (2,740 ft), situated at the foot of the Beardmore Glacier, Ross Ice Shelf, Antarctica at 83°45′S 171°00′E.

== Discovery ==
It was discovered on 3 December 1908, by Ernest Shackleton and his south polar party, on their journey towards the South Pole during the Nimrod Expedition. Through their ascent of this hill the party gained their first sight of the glacier which provided the route to the polar plateau and the pole itself. Shackleton recorded: "We reached the base of the mountain which we hoped to climb in order to gain a view of the surrounding country [...] With great difficulty we clambered up this rock face, and then ascended a gentle snow slope [...] From the top of this ridge there burst upon our view an open road to the south, for there stretched before us a great glacier [...] stretching away south inland until at last it seemed to merge in high inland ice". Shackleton named the hill that provided this vantage point "Mount Hope", for the promise that it provided. Shackleton's party ascended the glacier to the plateau, but turned back before reaching the Pole.

Three years later, Captain Scott's party followed the same route and reached the Pole, but the entire party perished on the return.

Mount Hope was the site of the final depot laid by the Ross Sea party in 1916, in support of Shackleton's abortive transcontinental march that was to have marked the Imperial Trans-Antarctic Expedition.

== See also ==
- Cape Allen
