= Ross Sea party =

1914–1917 Antarctic exploration

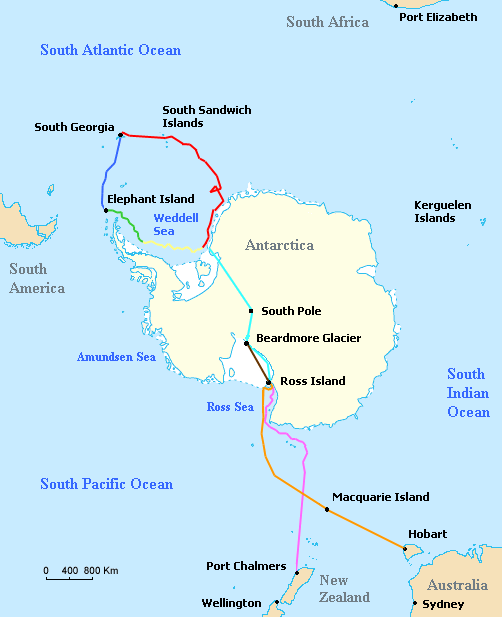
Routes of Endurance, the James Caird, and Aurora, the overland supply depot route of the Ross Sea party, and the planned overland route of the Weddell Sea party led by Ernest Shackleton on his Trans-Antarctic Expedition of 1914–1915: Voyage of Endurance Drift of Endurance in pack ice Sea ice drift after Endurance sinks Voyage of the James Caird Planned trans-Antarctic route Voyage of Aurora to Antarctica Retreat of Aurora Supply depot route

The Ross Sea party was a component of Sir Ernest Shackleton's 1914–1917 Imperial Trans-Antarctic Expedition. Its task was to lay a series of supply depots across the Great Ice Barrier from the Ross Sea to the Beardmore Glacier, along the polar route established by earlier Antarctic expeditions. The expedition's main party, under Shackleton, was to land near Vahsel Bay on the Weddell Sea on the opposite coast of Antarctica, and to march across the continent via the South Pole to the Ross Sea. As the main party would be unable to carry sufficient fuel and supplies for the whole distance, their survival depended on the Ross Sea party setting up supply depots, which would cover the final quarter of their journey.

Shackleton set sail from London on his ship Endurance, bound for the Weddell Sea in August 1914. Meanwhile, the Ross Sea party personnel gathered in Australia, prior to departure for the Ross Sea in the second expedition ship, SY Aurora. Organisational and financial problems delayed their start until December 1914, which shortened their first depot-laying season. After their arrival the inexperienced party struggled to master the art of Antarctic travel, in the process losing most of their sled dogs.

A greater misfortune occurred at the onset of the southern winter when the Aurora, locked in an ice-floe which broke off from the main shelf, was torn from its moorings. The ocean currents then took the ship further away from the sledding parties marooned on shore, and drifted for over six months before breaking free of the ice. The Aurora's damaged rudder forced her to return to New Zealand rather than returning for the stranded shore party.

Despite these setbacks, the Ross Sea party survived inter-personnel disputes, extreme weather, illness, and the deaths of three of its members to carry out its mission in full during its second Antarctic season. This success proved ultimately without purpose, because Shackleton's main expedition was unable to land after Endurance was crushed in the Weddell Sea ice. Shackleton eventually led his men to safety, but the transcontinental march did not take place and the Ross Sea party's depots were not required.

The Ross Sea party remained stranded until January 1917, when Aurora, which had been repaired and refitted in New Zealand, arrived to rescue them. Public recognition of their efforts was slow in coming, but in due course four Albert Medals were awarded to members of the party, two posthumously. Shackleton later wrote that those who died "gave their lives for their country as surely as those who gave up their lives in France or Flanders".

== Background ==
After the conquest of the South Pole by Roald Amundsen in December 1911, Shackleton, who had sought this achievement himself, was forced to rethink his polar ambitions. He believed that there remained "one great main objective of Antarctic journeyings—the crossing of the South Polar continent from sea to sea." Basing his strategy on plans developed earlier by the Scottish explorer William Spiers Bruce, Shackleton planned to land with his main party as far south as possible, on the Weddell Sea coast. His transcontinental team would then march southward to the Pole, before continuing across the polar plateau and descending via the Beardmore Glacier (which Shackleton had discovered in 1909) to the Great Ice Barrier. The final stretch would take them across the Barrier to McMurdo Sound on the Ross Sea coast.

Shackleton estimated that the crossing would cover approximately 1,800 miles (2,900 km), a distance too great for his party to carry all its supplies. In support of the main journey, therefore, a separate Ross Sea party would land in McMurdo Sound and would lay a series of supply depots across the 400 miles (640 km) width of the Barrier, to assist the crossing group home. It would also carry out scientific investigations. Shackleton described the depot-laying as vital to the success of the whole undertaking, but believed it would not present any great difficulties in execution. He would later provide the leader of his Ross Sea support party with conflicting instructions on the task; stating on one hand it was of "supreme importance" to have the depots laid, but on the other that he would be carrying what he described as "sufficient provisions and equipment" to cross Antarctica to McMurdo Sound.

In a letter of 18 September 1914, Shackleton stated that he did not want his support party to "have the anxiety of feeling" that he was absolutely dependent on the depots—"in case some very serious accident" incapacitated the depot-laying. The Ross Sea party's vessel would be SY Aurora, a ship recently used by Douglas Mawson and the Australasian Antarctic Expedition.

== Personnel ==
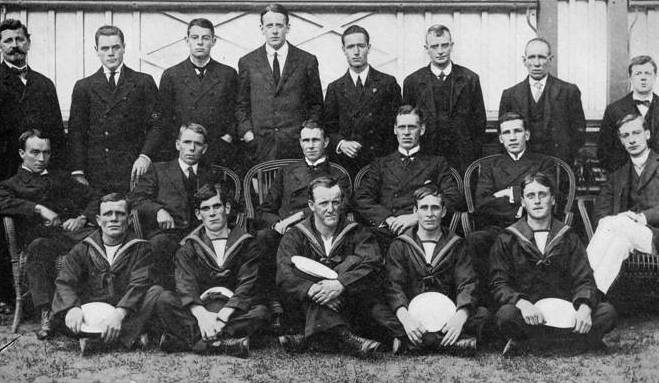
Back row from left: Ernest Joyce, Victor Hayward, John Cope, Arnold Spencer-Smith; centre: Aeneas Mackintosh and Joseph Stenhouse third and fourth from left

To lead the Ross Sea party Shackleton chose Aeneas Mackintosh, having first attempted to persuade the Admiralty to provide him with a naval crew. Mackintosh, like Shackleton, was a former Merchant Navy officer, who had been on the Nimrod Expedition until his participation was cut short by an accident that resulted in the loss of his right eye.

Another Nimrod veteran, Ernest Joyce, whose Antarctic experiences had begun with Captain Robert Falcon Scott's Discovery Expedition, was appointed to take charge of sledging and dogs. Joyce was described by Shackleton's biographer, Roland Huntford, as "a strange mixture of fraud, flamboyance and ability", but his depot-laying work during the Nimrod Expedition had impressed Shackleton. On Nimrod, Joyce led the team that laid vital supplies for Shackleton's returning southern party, and Shackleton said "Joyce knows his work well". Ernest Wild, a Royal Naval petty officer, was added to the party possibly through the persuasion of his brother, Frank Wild, who was travelling as Shackleton's second-in-command on Endurance.

Some of the appointments to the party were made rather hurriedly, reflecting the limited time frame that Shackleton had allowed for preliminary organisation. Joseph Stenhouse, a young officer from the British India Steam Navigation Company, was appointed as the Aurora's first officer after travelling from Australia to London to seek an interview with Shackleton. The Reverend Arnold Spencer-Smith, a Scottish Episcopal Church priest and former schoolmaster, joined as a replacement for one of the original members of the expedition who had left for active service in the First World War. Victor Hayward, a London finance clerk with a taste for adventure was recruited on the basis of his having worked on a ranch in Canada.

Although the Ross Sea party's main role was to lay supply depots, Shackleton added a small scientific team to carry out biological, meteorological and magnetic research in the region. The chief scientist in this group was Alexander Stevens, a Scots geologist and former theology student. John Cope, a 21-year-old Cambridge graduate, was the team's biologist; a would-be medical student, he later became ship's surgeon. Two other scientists were appointed in Australia, the physicist Dick Richards (who signed up for a nominal wage of £1 per week) and industrial chemist Keith Jack. An Australian cousin of Spencer-Smith's, Irvine Gaze, was taken on as a general assistant.

== Problems in Australia ==
Mackintosh and the nucleus of the party arrived in Sydney, late in October 1914. They found that Aurora was in no condition for an Antarctic voyage, and required an extensive overhaul. The registration of the ship in Shackleton's name had not been properly completed, and Shackleton had evidently misunderstood the terms under which he had acquired the vessel from Mawson. Mawson had reclaimed much of the equipment and stores that had been aboard, all of which needed replacing. To compound the problem, Shackleton had reduced the funds available to Mackintosh from £2,000 to £1,000, expecting him to bridge the difference by soliciting for supplies as free gifts and by mortgaging the ship. There was no cash available to cover the wages and living expenses for the party.

Shackleton was now beyond reach, aboard Endurance en route for Antarctica. Supporters of the expedition in Australia, notably Edgeworth David who had served as chief scientist on the Nimrod Expedition, were concerned at the plight in which Mackintosh's party had been placed. They helped to raise sufficient funds to keep the expedition alive, but several members of the party resigned or abandoned the venture. Some of the last-minute replacements were raw recruits; Adrian Donnelly, a locomotive engineer with no sea experience, signed as second engineer, while wireless operator Lionel Hooke was an 18-year-old electrical apprentice.

Despite all these difficulties, Aurora set out from Sydney on 15 December 1914, bound for Hobart, where she arrived on 20 December to take on final stores and fuel. On 24 December, three weeks later than the original target sailing date, the Aurora finally sailed for the Antarctic, arriving off Ross Island on 16 January 1915. Mackintosh decided to establish a shore base at Cape Evans, Captain Robert Falcon Scott's headquarters during the 1910–1913 Terra Nova Expedition, and to find a safe winter mooring nearby for Aurora. Joyce called this decision of Mackintosh to winter the ship—which would have serious ramifications later on—as "the silliest damn rot that could have possibly occurred". It was the first of a number of decisions by Mackintosh that Joyce disagreed with.

== First season, 1914–1915 ==
=== Depot-laying, January–March 1915 ===
Believing that Shackleton might attempt a crossing during the first season, Mackintosh decided that the first two depots had to be laid without delay, one at 79°S near Minna Bluff, a prominent Barrier landmark, and another further south at the 80° mark. These were, in his view, the minimum that would enable Shackleton's party to survive a crossing of the Barrier. The delayed arrival of Aurora in the Antarctic had given little time for acclimatisation for the dogs and for the untrained men, and this led to differences of view about how to proceed. Ernest Joyce, by far the most experienced Antarctic traveller in the party, favoured a cautious approach and wanted to delay the start by at least a week. Joyce claimed that Shackleton had given him independent control over sledging activities, a view rejected by Mackintosh and later demonstrated as without foundation.

Mackintosh's view having prevailed, on 24 January 1915 the first of three parties set out for the Barrier journey, the others following on the next day. Further dissension soon arose between Joyce and Mackintosh about how far south the dogs should be taken. Joyce wanted them to go no further than the Bluff, but Mackintosh's sense of urgency meant that they were taken on to 80°S. A further setback was the failure of the attempts to move stores by motor tractor. Although, ultimately, the depots were laid at Minna Bluff and at 80°S, the overall operation was beset by problems. Not all the stores had reached the depots, and, as well as the motor tractor failure, all ten dogs taken on the journey perished during the return.

By the time that all parties were reunited at Hut Point (Scott's old Discovery base at the edge of the Barrier) on 25 March, the men themselves were exhausted and frostbitten, and there was a significant loss of confidence in Mackintosh. The condition of the sea ice in McMurdo Sound made the journey back to Cape Evans impossible, so the party was stranded until 1 June, in spartan conditions and relying on seals for fresh meat and blubber fuel.

It was later revealed that this first depot-laying season, and its attendant hardships, had been unnecessary. Shackleton had stated, in a letter sent from South Georgia on 5 December 1914 (the date that Endurance left South Georgia for the Weddell Sea) to Ernest Perris of the Daily Chronicle, that he had "no chance of crossing that season". Mackintosh was to have been informed of this, but "the cable was never sent".

=== Loss of the Aurora ===
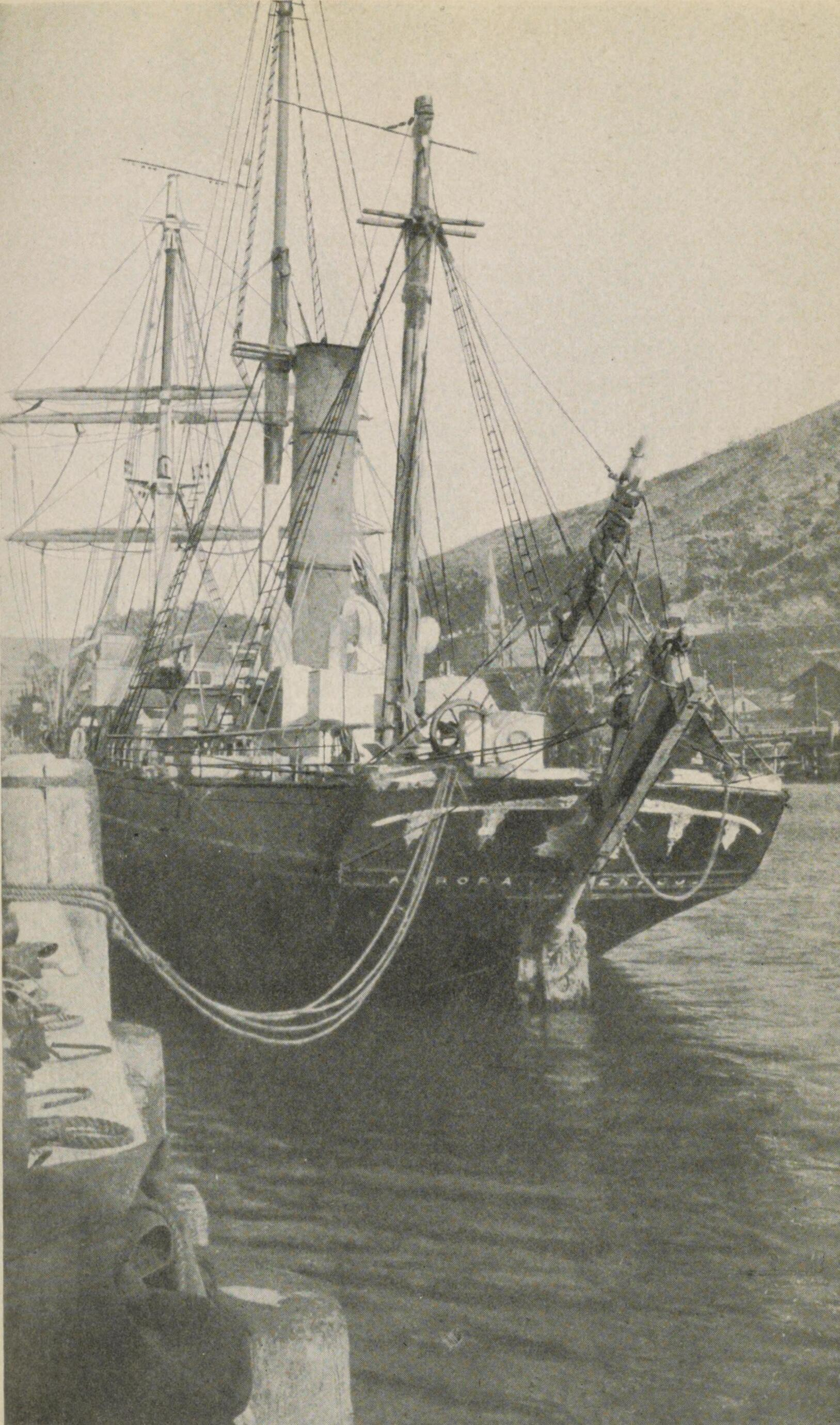
The Aurora, pictured in New Zealand after the drift

When Mackintosh departed on 25 January 1915 to lead the depot-laying parties he left the Aurora under the command of First Officer Joseph Stenhouse. The priority task for Stenhouse was to find a winter anchorage in accordance with Shackleton's instructions not to attempt to anchor south of the Glacier Tongue, an icy protrusion midway between Cape Evans and Hut Point. This search proved a long and hazardous process. Stenhouse manoeuvred in the Sound for several weeks before eventually deciding to winter close to the Cape Evans shore headquarters. After a final visit to Hut Point on 11 March to pick up four early returners from the depot-laying parties, he brought the ship to Cape Evans and made it fast with anchors and hawsers, thereafter allowing it to become frozen into the shore ice.

On the night of 7 May, a severe gale erupted, tearing the Aurora from its moorings and carrying it out to sea attached to a large ice floe. Attempts to contact the shore party by wireless failed. Held fast, and with its engines out of commission, the Aurora began a long drift northward away from Cape Evans, out of McMurdo Sound, into the Ross Sea and eventually into the Southern Ocean. Ten men were left stranded ashore at Cape Evans. Aurora finally broke free from the ice on 12 February 1916, and managed to reach New Zealand on 2 April.

=== Improvisation ===
Because Mackintosh had intended to use Aurora as the party's main living quarters, most of the shore party's personal gear, food, equipment and fuel was still aboard when the ship departed. Although the sledging rations intended for Shackleton's depots had been landed, the ten stranded men were left with "only the clothes on their backs". Mackintosh summarised their situation: "We have to face the possibility that we may have to stay here, unsupported, for two years. We cannot expect rescue before then, and so we must conserve and economize on what we have, and we must seek and apply what substitutes we can gather".

Their first recourse was to the food and materials from supplies left behind by Scott's and Shackleton's earlier expeditions. These supplies provided a harvest of material, which enabled clothing, footwear and equipment to be improvised, while the party used seal meat and blubber as extra sources of food and fuel. "Joyce's Famous Tailoring Shop" fashioned clothes from a large canvas tent abandoned by Scott's expedition. Even a brand of tobacco—"Hut Point Mixture"—was concocted by Ernest Wild from sawdust, tea, coffee and a few dried herbs. By these means the party equipped itself for the sledging journeys that lay ahead in the second season. On the last day of August, Mackintosh recorded in his diary the work that had been completed during the winter, and ended: "Tomorrow we start for Hut Point".

== Second depot-laying season, 1915–1916 ==
=== Journey to Mount Hope ===
The second season's work was planned in three stages. First, all depot stores—3,800 pounds (1,700 kg) in total—were to be transferred from Cape Evans to Hut Point. These stores would then be transported from Hut Point to a base depot at Minna Bluff. Finally, a journey south would be made, to reinforce the 80° depot and lay new ones at 81°, 82°, 83°, and lastly at Mount Hope, near the foot of the Beardmore Glacier, at 83°30'.

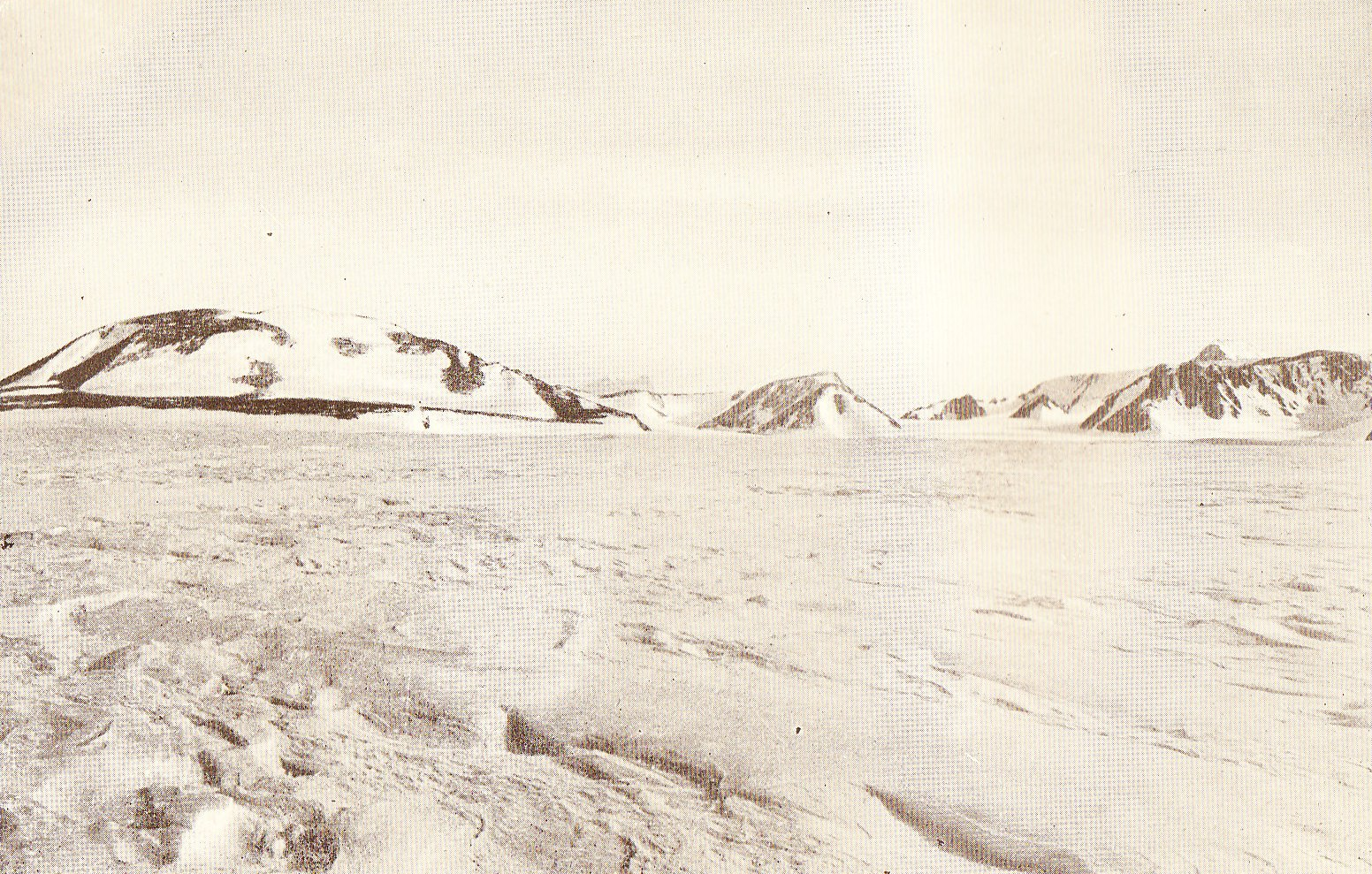
On the left is Mount Hope, the site of the Ross Sea party's final depot

Nine men in teams of three would undertake the sledging work. The first stage, hauling over the sea ice to Hut Point, started on 1 September 1915, and was completed without mishap by the end of the month. The second stage, hauling back and forth between Hut Point and the Bluff, proved more problematic, with unfavourable weather, a difficult Barrier surface, and more dissension between Mackintosh and Joyce over methods. This time, Mackintosh favoured man-hauling while Joyce wanted to use the four fit dogs—of the six dogs that had survived the winter, two were pregnant and could not work. Mackintosh allowed Joyce to proceed in his own way, leading a party of six with the dogs, while Mackintosh continued to man-haul with Wild and Spencer-Smith. Joyce's methods proved the more effective in terms of loads carried and the fitness of the men. The base depot at Minna Bluff was completed by 28 December.

Shortly after the main march to Mount Hope began, on 1 January 1916, the failure of a Primus stove led to three men (Cope, Jack and Gaze) returning to Cape Evans, where they joined Stevens. The scientist had remained at the base to take weather measurements and watch for the ship. The remaining six sledged south, with Spencer-Smith failing rapidly and Mackintosh complaining of a painful knee. They battled on, laying the depots, using only minimum provisions themselves although, at Joyce's insistence, keeping the dogs well-fed: "The dogs are our only hope; our lives depend on them." As they neared Mount Hope, Spencer-Smith collapsed, unable to proceed. The others left him alone in a small tent and travelled the remaining few miles to lay the final depot at Mount Hope on 26 January. Ernest Wild left a letter for his brother Frank who he assumed was by then travelling across from the Weddell Sea with Shackleton.

=== Return ===
The party turned for home on 27 January, picking up Spencer-Smith on 29th. He was by now physically helpless and had to be loaded on to the sledge. Mackintosh was soon unable to pull, and could only stagger along beside the sledge; by this time the de facto leadership of the group had passed to Joyce and Richards. Joyce described the group's plight: "I have never known such shocking conditions. This is one of the hardest pulls since we have trekked ... all we can do is to slog on with the greatest possible speed."

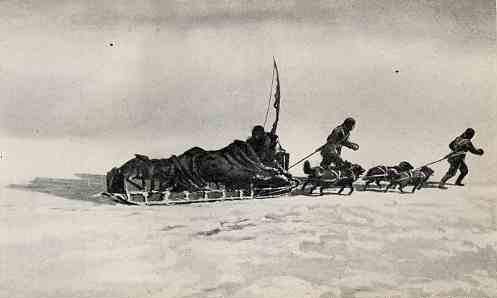
Mackintosh and Spencer-Smith being drawn on the sledge by Joyce and Wild

In spite of their difficulties the party made good progress until, on 17 February about 10 miles (16 km) short of the Bluff depot, they were halted by a blizzard. They remained tent-bound for five days, by which time their supplies had run out. In desperation the party left the tent the next day, but it soon proved impossible for Mackintosh and Spencer-Smith to travel further. Joyce, Richards and Hayward then sledged through the blizzard to the Bluff, leaving the invalids in a tent under the care of Wild. Three of the dogs, Con, Towser and Gunner had performed stoutly on the journey but were exhausted. The fourth dog Oscar was inclined to be lazy but "in the crisis the massive Oscar just lowered his great head and pulled as he never did when things were going well ... he alone gave that extra little strength that enabled us to finally make the depot."

This round trip of about 20 miles (32 km) took them a week to complete. They returned with food and fuel to sustain their comrades, and the march resumed. Within a short time Mackintosh joined Spencer-Smith on the sledge, and before long, Hayward too collapsed. The three men still on their feet were by now too weak to haul three invalids, so on 8 March Mackintosh volunteered to stay in the tent while the others attempted to take Spencer-Smith and Hayward to Hut Point. A day later Spencer-Smith died, utterly worn out by exhaustion and scurvy, and was buried in the ice. Joyce and Wild reached Hut Point with Hayward on 11 March and went back for Mackintosh. By 16 March, the whole surviving party had reached the hut.

From the start of the hauling of loads from Cape Evans on 1 September 1915 to the arrival of the survivors back at Hut Point, a total of 198 days had passed, the longest sledging journey in terms of elapsed time undertaken on any expedition up to that time.

=== Deaths of Mackintosh and Hayward ===
The five survivors slowly recovered their strength with a diet of seal meat. The ice was too thin for them to risk the final trip to Cape Evans, and the monotony of their diet and surroundings became wearisome. On 8 May, Mackintosh announced that he and Hayward intended to risk the ice and walk to Cape Evans. Against the strenuous objections of their companions they departed, and within the hour disappeared into a blizzard.

The others went to look for them after the storm and found only tracks leading to the edge of the broken ice. Mackintosh and Hayward were never seen again. They had either fallen through the thin ice or had been carried out to sea on an ice floe. Richards, Joyce and Wild waited until 15 July to make the trip to Cape Evans, where they were at last reunited with Stevens, Cope, Jack and Gaze.

== Rescue ==
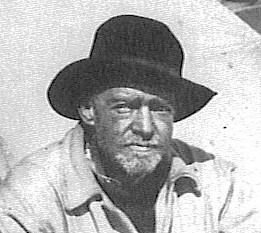
Ernest Shackleton in 1915, after the loss of the Endurance

After Aurora's arrival in New Zealand in April 1916, Stenhouse began the task of raising funds for the ship's repair and refit, prior to its return to Antarctica to rescue the marooned men. This proved difficult: nothing had been heard from Shackleton since Endurance had left South Georgia in December 1914, and it seemed likely that relief expeditions were necessary for both strands of the expedition. However, the Imperial Trans-Antarctic Expedition was completely out of funds, and there was no obvious alternative source of finance. Given the chaotic financial circumstances in which Aurora had departed from Australia, private subscribers were hard to find. Finally, the governments of Australia, New Zealand and Great Britain agreed jointly to fund the refit of Aurora, but insisted on their joint committee having full control of the relief expedition.

On 20 May, Shackleton arrived in South Georgia with the story of his escape after the loss of Endurance in the Weddell Sea. His first priority was to effect the rescue of the rest of the Weddell Sea party, stranded on Elephant Island, and it was early December before he arrived in New Zealand. He was too late to influence the organisation of the Ross Sea party's relief; the joint committee had appointed John King Davis to lead the expedition and had dismissed Stenhouse and Aurora's other officers. Davis was a veteran of Mawson's recent Australasian expedition, and had turned down Shackleton's offers in 1914 of the command of either Endurance or Aurora. As a gesture, Shackleton was permitted to sail as a supernumerary officer when the ship left on 20 December. On 10 January 1917, when Aurora reached Cape Evans, the survivors were astonished to see Shackleton approaching them; they then learned for the first time the futility of their labours. After a further week spent in a vain search for the bodies of Mackintosh and Hayward, Aurora headed north for New Zealand, carrying the seven survivors of the original shore party.

== Aftermath ==
The Hut Point and Cape Evans huts remain, protected by the Antarctic Heritage Trust and the New Zealand government. Within the Cape Evans hut an inscription by Richards on the wall near his bunk, listing the names of those lost, can still be read, but the generally deteriorating condition of the huts has caused concern.

The Aurora survived for less than a year after her final return from the Ross Sea. Shackleton had sold her for £10,000, and her new role was as a coal-carrier between Australia and South America. After leaving Newcastle, New South Wales on 20 June 1917, Aurora disappeared in the Pacific Ocean. On 2 January 1918, she was listed as missing by Lloyd's of London and presumed lost, having either foundered in a storm or been sunk by an enemy raider. Aboard her was James Paton of the Ross Sea ship's party, who was still serving as her boatswain. Ernest Wild was also a victim of the First World War. He died of typhoid in Malta, on 10 March 1918, while serving with the Royal Navy in the Mediterranean.

On 4 July 1923, Joyce and Richards were awarded Albert Medals by George V for their bravery and life-saving efforts during the second depot-laying journey. Wild and Victor Hayward received the same award, posthumously. Many of the survivors enjoyed long and successful careers. The young wireless operator, Lionel Hooke, joined AWA and was responsible for many technological innovations. He became the company's managing director in 1945 and its chairman in 1962, having been knighted for services to industry in 1957. Of the four dogs who survived the trek, Con was killed by the other dogs in a fight before the rescue. The others, Oscar, Gunner and Towser, returned in the ship to New Zealand and were placed in Wellington Zoo, where Oscar lived, allegedly, to the age of 25. Near the end of his life Dick Richards, the last survivor of the party, was without regrets and did not regard the struggle as futile. Rather, he believed, it was something that the human spirit had accomplished, and that no undertaking carried through to conclusion was for nothing.

== See also ==
- List of Antarctic expeditions
- Heroic Age of Antarctic Exploration

== Sources ==
- Bechervaise, John (1981). "Davis, John King (1884–1967)". Australian Dictionary of National Biography. Melbourne University Press.
- Bickel, Lennard (2001). 'Shackleton's Forgotten Men: The Untold Tale of an Antarctic Tragedy. London: Pimlico Press. ISBN 0-7126-6807-1.
- Fisher, Marjorie and James (1957). Shackleton. London: James Barrie Books.
- Griggs, Kim (7 December 2001). "Scott's hut needs urgent repair". BBC.
- Haddelsey, Stephen (2008). Ice Captain: The Life of J.R. Stonehouse. Stroud, Gloucestershire: The History Press. ISBN 978-0-7509-4348-2.
- Huntford, Roland (1985). Shackleton. London: Hodder & Stoughton. ISBN 0-340-25007-0.
- McElrea, Richard (2004). Polar Castaways: The Ross Sea Party of Sir Ernest Shackleton, 1914–17. Montreal: McGill-Queen's University Press. ISBN 0-7735-2825-3.
- McOrist, Wilson (2015). Shackleton's Heroes. London: The Robson Press. ISBN 978-1-84954-815-1.
- Richards, Richard W. (2002). The Ross Sea Shore Party 1914–17. Norwich: The Erskine Press. ISBN 1-85297-077-4.
- Shackleton, Ernest (1919). South. London: William Heinemann.
- Shackleton, Ernest (1911). The Heart of the Antarctic. London: William Heinemann.
- Tyler-Lewis, Kelly (2007). The Lost Men: The Harrowing Story of Shackleton's Ross Sea Party. London: Bloomsbury Publishing. ISBN 978-0-7475-7972-4.
