= SY Aurora's drift =

1915 event during Shackleton's antarctic expedition

SY Aurora, anchored to the Antarctic ice

The drift of the Antarctic exploration vessel SY Aurora was an ordeal which lasted 312 days, affecting the Ross Sea party of Sir Ernest Shackleton's Imperial Trans-Antarctic Expedition, 1914–1917. It began when the ship broke loose from its anchorage in McMurdo Sound in May 1915, during a gale. Caught in heavy pack ice and unable to manoeuvre, Aurora, with eighteen men aboard, was carried into the open waters of the Ross Sea and Southern Ocean, leaving ten men stranded ashore with meagre provisions.

Aurora, a 40-year-old former Arctic whaler registered as a steam yacht, had brought the Ross Sea party to Cape Evans in McMurdo Sound in January 1915, to establish its base there in support of Shackleton's proposed transcontinental crossing. When Aurora's captain Aeneas Mackintosh took charge of activities ashore, first officer Joseph Stenhouse assumed command of the ship. Stenhouse's inexperience may have contributed to the choice of an inappropriate winter's berth, although his options were restricted by the instructions of his superiors. After the ship was blown away it suffered severe damage in the ice, including the destruction of its rudder and the loss of its anchors; on several occasions its situation was such that Stenhouse considered abandonment. Efforts to make Wireless contact with Cape Evans and, later, with stations in New Zealand and Australia, were unavailing; the drift extended through the southern winter and spring to reach a position north of the Antarctic Circle. In February 1916 the ice broke up, and a month later the ship was free. It was subsequently able to reach New Zealand for repairs and resupply, before returning to Antarctica to rescue the seven surviving members of the shore party.

The committee charged with supervision of the relief effort were critical of Shackleton's initial organisation of personnel and equipment for the Ross Sea expedition. Despite his role in saving the ship, after Aurora's arrival in Port Chalmers, Stenhouse was removed from command by the organisers of the relief expedition, so the ship returned to McMurdo Sound under a new commander and with a substantially different crew. Stenhouse was later appointed an Officer of the Order of the British Empire (OBE) for his service aboard Aurora.

== Background ==
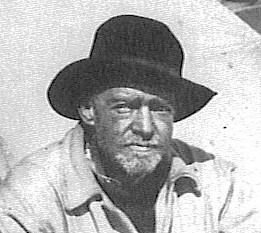
Ernest Shackleton, overall expedition leader

The Imperial Trans-Antarctic Expedition, an effort to cross Antarctica on foot, comprised two parties. The first, under Ernest Shackleton, sailed to the Weddell Sea in Endurance, intending to establish a base there from which a group would march across the continent via the South Pole to McMurdo Sound on the Ross Sea side. A second party under Aeneas Mackintosh in Aurora was landed at a Ross Sea base, with the task of laying supply depots along the expected route of the latter stages of Shackleton's march, a mission which Shackleton—who had explored much of the route in 1908–1909—thought straightforward. Shackleton devoted little time to the details of the Ross Sea operation; thus, on arriving in Australia to take up his appointment, Mackintosh found himself faced with an unseaworthy ship and no funds to rectify the situation. Aurora, though strongly built, was 40 years old and had recently returned from Douglas Mawson's Australasian Antarctic Expedition in need of an extensive refit. After the intervention of the eminent Australian polar scientist Edgeworth David the Australian government provided money and dockyard facilities to make Aurora fit for further Antarctic service.

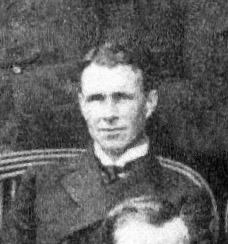
Aeneas Mackintosh, Ross Sea party commander

Of the Ross Sea party that eventually sailed from Australia in December 1914, only Mackintosh, Ernest Joyce, who was in charge of the dogs, and James "Scotty" Paton, the ship's boatswain, had significant experience with Antarctic conditions. Some of the party were last-minute additions: Adrian Donnelly, a railway engineer who had never been to sea, became Aurora's second engineering officer, while Lionel Hooke, the wireless operator, was an 18-year-old apprentice. (Note: Hooke eventually became chairman of AWA, and was knighted in 1957.) Aurora's chief officer was Joseph Stenhouse, from the British India Steam Navigation Company. Stenhouse, who was 26 years old when he joined the expedition, was in Australia recovering from a bout of depression when he heard of Shackleton's plans, and had travelled to London to secure the Aurora post. Although as a boy he had been inspired by the polar exploits of Fridtjof Nansen, Scott and William Speirs Bruce, Stenhouse had no direct experience of Antarctic waters or ice conditions.

== In McMurdo Sound ==
=== Winter anchorage ===
Aurora arrived in McMurdo Sound in January 1915, late in the season due to its delayed departure from Australia. Because the party was three weeks behind schedule Mackintosh decided that the depot-laying work should begin at once, and took charge of this himself. By 25 January he was leading one of the early sledging parties, leaving Stenhouse in command of the ship. In the few weeks before the sound froze over for the winter, Stenhouse had to supervise the landing of most of the equipment and stores, and find a safe winter berth for the ship; Mackintosh's departing instruction had been explicit that this was Stenhouse's paramount duty.

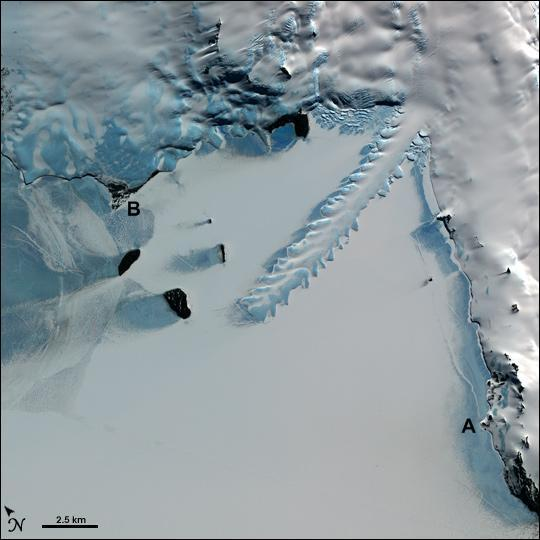
Aerial view of frozen McMurdo Sound, showing Glacier Tongue with (lower right, A) Hut Point and (upper-mid left, B) Cape Evans

The only known safe winter anchorage in McMurdo Sound was Scott's original Discovery Expedition headquarters from 1901 to 1903, at Hut Point, south of the projection known as Glacier Tongue which divided the sound into two sectors. Scott's ship had been frozen in the ice for two years, and had needed two rescue ships and several explosive charges to release it. Shackleton was determined to avoid this, and had given Mackintosh instructions, relayed to Stenhouse, to winter Aurora north of the Tongue. No ship had previously wintered in the exposed northern section of the sound, and the wisdom of doing this was questioned by the experienced seamen Ernest Joyce and James Paton in their private journals. After the expedition was over, John King Davis, who was to lead the Ross Sea party relief mission, wrote that Shackleton's instruction should have been ignored and that Stenhouse should have taken Aurora to the safety of Hut Point, even at the risk of becoming frozen in.

Stenhouse first attempted to anchor the ship on the north side of Glacier Tongue itself. Disaster was only narrowly avoided when a change in the wind direction threatened to imprison Aurora between the Tongue and the advancing pack ice. With other options considered and rejected, Stenhouse finally decided to anchor at Cape Evans, site of Captain Scott's 1911 Terra Nova headquarters, six nautical miles (11 km) north of Glacier Tongue. (Note: Scott's ship Terra Nova had not wintered in Antarctica but had sailed to New Zealand after landing its shore parties here, as had Nimrod during Shackleton' 1907–1909 expedition.) On 14 March, after numerous failed attempts, Stenhouse manoeuvred Aurora into position, stern-first towards the shore at Cape Evans, where two large anchors had been sunk and cemented into the ground. Cables, hawsers, and a heavy chain attached these to the ship's stern. Two bower anchors were also dropped. By 14 March the ship was settling into the shore ice with, according to second officer Leslie Thomson, "enough hawsers and anchors to hold a battleship".

=== Blown away ===
The unsheltered Cape Evans anchorage exposed Aurora to the full harshness of the winter weather. By mid-April the ship resembled a "wrecked hulk", listing sharply to starboard and subject to violent shocks and tremors as the ice moved around it. When the weather permitted, attempts were made to rig the wireless aerials that would enable communication with the shore parties and later, it was hoped, with Australia and New Zealand. The remaining sledging rations for the depots were put ashore, (Note: The rest of the depot rations had been landed earlier and were stored in the hut.) but much of the shore parties' personal supplies, fuel and equipment remained on board, as it was assumed that the ship would stay where it was throughout the winter.

At about 9 p.m. on 6 May, during a fierce storm, the men aboard heard two "explosive reports" as the main hawsers parted from the anchors. The combined forces of the wind and the rapidly moving ice had torn Aurora from its berth and, encased in a large ice floe, the ship was adrift in the Sound. Stenhouse ordered that steam be raised in the hopes that, under engine power, Aurora might be able to work back to the shore when the gale abated, but the engines had been partly dismantled for winter repairs, and could not be started immediately. In any event the 98 horsepower (73 kW) engine and single-screw propeller lacked the required power. Slowly, the ship drifted further from the shore; the noise of the storm meant that the scientific party ashore at Cape Evans hut heard nothing. It would be morning before they found the ship had gone.

Eighteen men were aboard when Aurora broke away, leaving ten marooned ashore. Four scientists were living in the Cape Evans hut; six members of the first depot-laying parties, including Mackintosh and Joyce, were stranded at Hut Point waiting an opportunity to cross the sea ice and return to Cape Evans. (Note: The Hut Point party learned of Aurora's disappearance when they finally reached Cape Evans on 2 June. In his diary Mackintosh described the news as "a knock-out blow".)

== Drift ==
=== First phase ===
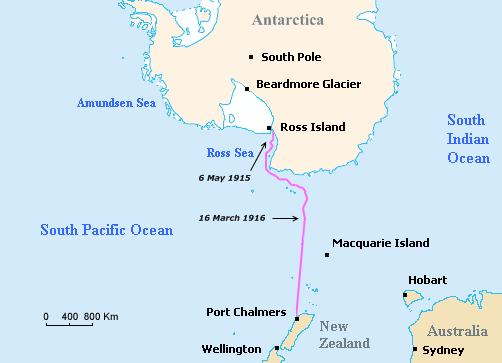
Map showing the path of Aurora's drift in pack ice from 6 May 1915, its position on release from the pack on 14 March 1916, and its subsequent retreat to Port Chalmers

By 8 May a continuous southerly gale had driven the ship northwards, still locked in the ice, out of McMurdo Sound and into the open Ross Sea. In his diary for 9 May Stenhouse summarised Aurora's position: "...fast in the pack and drifting God knows where [...] We are all in good health [...] we have good spirits and we will get through." He recognised that this was the end of any hope of wintering the ship in McMurdo Sound, and expressed concern for the men at Cape Evans: "It is a dismal prospect for them [...] we have the remaining Burberrys, clothing etc for next year's sledging still on board." During the next two days the winds reached a force that made it impossible for the men to work on deck, but on 12 May the weather had moderated sufficiently for a temporary wireless aerial to be rigged, and Hooke began trying to contact the men ashore. His Morse messages failed to reach Cape Evans. Although the transmitter's range was normally no more than 300 miles (480 km), Hooke attempted to raise the radio station at Macquarie Island, more than 1,300 nautical miles (2,400 km) away, again without success.

On 14 May the broken remains of the two bower anchors, which were threatening to capsize the ship, were hauled in. During the following days the pack ice thickened, and in increasingly turbulent weather the boilers were closed down, since attempting to manoeuvre under power in these conditions would merely waste coal. Replenishing the ship's supply of fresh water was a further difficulty. A large iceberg was in view, but too far away in the prevailing weather conditions to be accessible, so to obtain drinking water the crew had to gather snow. Food was less of a problem; they were able to augment Aurora's food supplies from the penguins and seals that gathered around the ship. To boost morale the crew were given a ration of rum to celebrate Empire Day on 24 May.

On 25 May, as Aurora drifted towards the Victoria Land coast, Stenhouse described a scene "like a graveyard", with heavy blocks of ice twisted and standing up on end. Aurora was under constant danger as this ice shifted around it. Stenhouse ordered the crew to prepare sledging gear and supplies for a possible march for the shore should Aurora be caught and crushed, but that immediate danger passed. Weeks of relative inactivity followed, while Stenhouse considered his options. If the ship remained icebound but stationary he would, if the sea ice allowed, send a sledge party back to Cape Evans with equipment and supplies. If the drift continued northward, as soon as the ship was free of the ice Stenhouse would head for New Zealand and, after repairs and resupply, would return to Cape Evans in September or October.

By 9 July the speed of the drift had increased, and there were signs of increasing pressure in the pack. On 21 July the ship was caught in a position that allowed the ice to squeeze it at both ends, a grip that smashed its rudder beyond repair. According to Hooke's diary: "All hands were ready to jump overboard onto the ice. It seemed certain that the ship must go." The next day Stenhouse prepared to abandon ship, but new movements in the ice eased the situation and eventually brought Aurora to a safer position. Plans to abandon the vessel were cancelled; Hooke repaired his wireless aerials and resumed his attempts to contact Macquarie Island. On 6 August the sun made its first appearance since the start of the drift. Aurora, still firmly held, was now 360 nautical miles (670 km) north of Cape Evans, close to Cape Adare at the northern tip of Victoria Land, where the Ross Sea merges into the Southern Ocean.

=== Southern Ocean phase ===
Section and deck plans of SY Aurora, illustrating the sturdy construction that enabled the 40-year-old ship to survive its ordeal. "Sheer strength was her forte."

When the ship passed Cape Adare, the direction of drift changed to north-westerly. On 10 August Stenhouse estimated that they were 45 nautical miles (83 km) north-east of the Cape, and that their daily drift was averaging just over 20 nautical miles (37 km). A few days later Stenhouse recorded that the ship was "backing and filling", meaning that it was drifting back and forth without making progress. "However, we cannot grumble and must be patient", he wrote, adding that from the crow's nest a distinct impression of open water could be seen. With the possibility that the edge of the pack was nearby, work on the construction of a jury rudder began. This first involved the removal of the wreckage of the smashed rudder, a task largely carried out by Engineer Donnelly. The jury rudder was constructed from makeshift materials, and by 26 August it was ready for use as soon as Aurora cleared the ice. It would then be lowered over the stern and operated manually, "like a huge oar".

On 25 August Hooke began picking up occasional radio signals being exchanged between Macquarie Island and New Zealand. By the end of August open leads were beginning to appear, and sometimes it was possible to discern a sea-swell under the ship. Severe weather returned in September, when a hurricane-force wind destroyed the wireless aerial and temporarily halted Hooke's efforts. On 22 September, when Aurora was in sight of the uninhabited Balleny Islands, Stenhouse estimated that they had travelled over 700 nautical miles (1,300 km) from Cape Evans, in what he called a "wonderful drift". He added that regular observations and records of the nature and direction of the ice had been maintained throughout: "It [the drift] has not been in vain, and [...] knowledge of the set and drift of the pack will be a valuable addition to the sum of human knowledge".

Aurora's circumstances changed little during the following months. Stenhouse worked hard to maintain morale, keeping the crew working whenever possible and organising leisure activities, including games of football and cricket on the ice. On 21 November Aurora crossed the Antarctic Circle, and it was at last evident that the ice around the ship was beginning to melt: "...one good hefty blizzard would cause a general break up", wrote Stenhouse. Christmas approached with the ice still holding firm; Stenhouse allowed the crew to prepare a feast, but noted in his journal: "I wish to God the blasted festivities were over [...] we are hogging in to the best while the poor beggars at Cape Evans have little or nothing!" A few days later the New Year was celebrated with an improvised band leading choruses of "Rule, Britannia" and "God Save the King".

=== Release ===
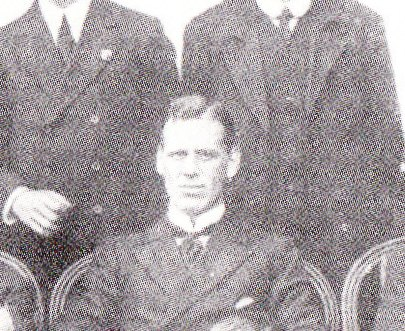
Joseph Stenhouse, who commanded Aurora during its drift

In the early days of January 1916 the floe which held the ship began to crack in the sun. Stenhouse surmised that, after repairs in New Zealand: "if we could leave Lyttleton [sic] (Note: The correct spelling of the town is "Lyttelton"; it is either misspelt by Stenhouse, or in transcription from his journal.) at the end of February, with luck and a quick passage south we might make Hut Point before the general freezing of the Sound." Fast-moving ice could be seen a short distance from the ship, but Aurora remained held fast throughout January.

With the Antarctic summer waning, Stenhouse had to consider the possibility that Aurora might be trapped for another year, and after reviewing fuel and stores he ordered the capture of more seals and penguins. This proved difficult, as the soft state of the ice made travel away from the ship hazardous. As the ice encasing the ship melted, the timber seams opened and were admitting around three to four feet (about a metre) of water daily, requiring regular work with the pumps. On 12 February, while the crew were busy with this activity, the ice around the ship finally began to break away. Within minutes the whole floe had splintered into fragments, a pool of water opened up, and Aurora was floating free. Next morning Stenhouse ordered the setting of sails, but on 15 February the ship was stopped by accumulated ice and remained, unable to move, for a further two weeks. Stenhouse was reluctant to use the engines because coal supplies were low, but on 1 March he decided he had no choice; he ordered steam to be raised, and next day the ship edged forward under engine power. After a series of stops and starts, on 6 March the edge of the ice was sighted from the crow's nest. On 14 March Aurora finally cleared the pack, after a drift of 312 days covering 1,600 nautical miles (3,000 km). Stenhouse recorded the ship's position on reaching the open sea as latitude 64°27'S, longitude 157°32'E.

== Return to civilization ==
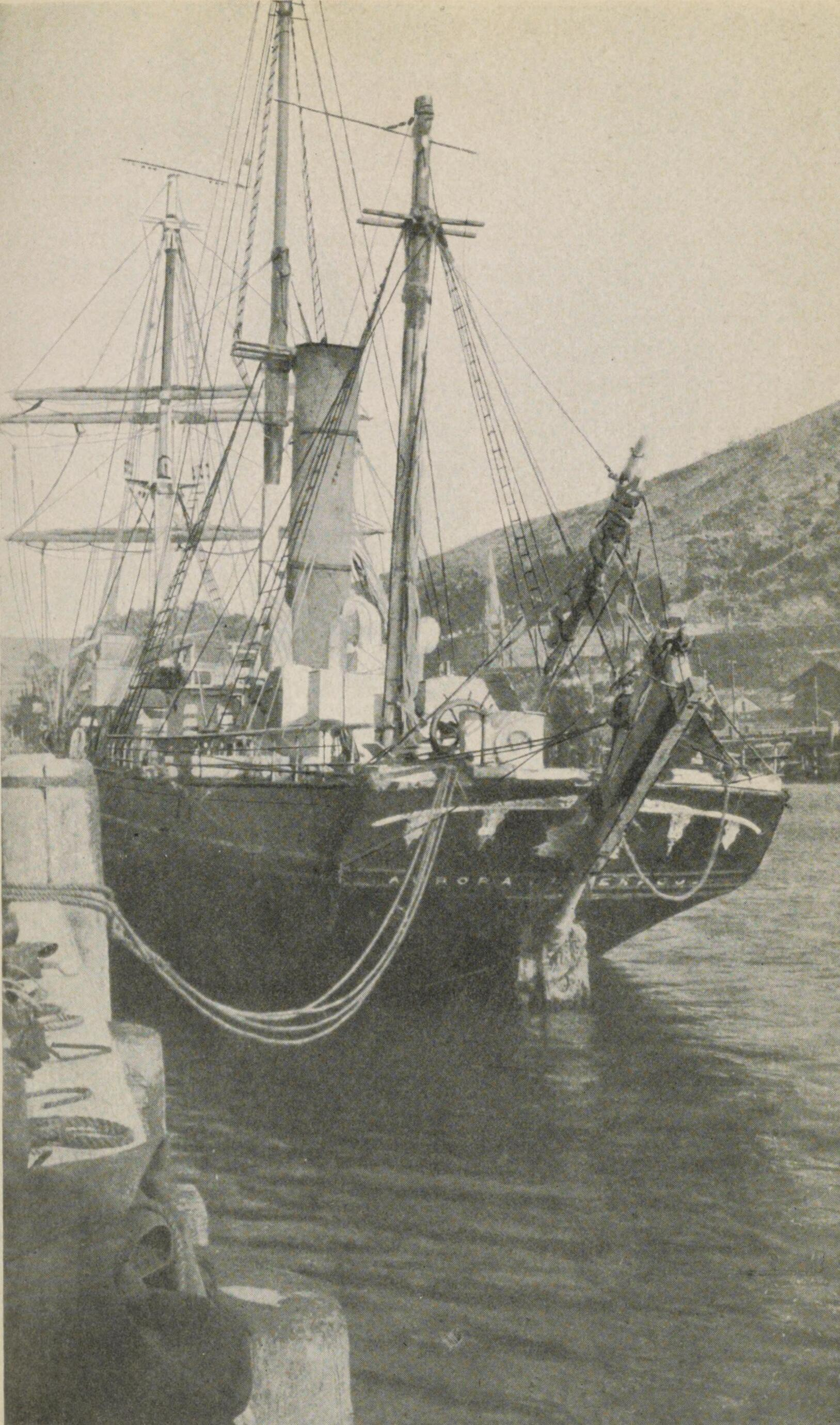
Aurora in New Zealand after the drift, with the emergency rudder visible

The delays in breaking free from the pack had ended Stenhouse's hopes of bringing rapid relief to Cape Evans. His priority now was to reach New Zealand and return to the Antarctic the following spring. During the final frustrating weeks in the pack, Hooke had been working on the wireless apparatus and had started transmitting again. He and the rest of the crew were unaware that the wireless station at Macquarie Island, the closest to their drift, had recently been closed by the Australian government as an economy measure. On 23 March, using a specially-rigged 80-foot (24 m) quadruple aerial, Hookes transmitted a message which, in freak atmospheric conditions, reached Bluff Station, New Zealand. The next day his signals were received in Hobart, Tasmania, and during the following days he reported the details of Aurora's position, its general situation, and the plight of the stranded party. These messages, and the freak conditions which made transmission possible over a much greater distance than the equipment's normal range, were reported throughout the world.

Aurora's passage from the ice towards safety proved slow and perilous. Coal supplies had to be conserved, allowing only limited use of the engines, and the improvised emergency rudder made steering difficult; the ship wallowed helplessly at times, in danger of foundering. Even after making contact with the outside world, Stenhouse was initially reluctant to seek direct assistance, fearful that a salvage claim might create further embarrassment for the expedition. He was obliged to request help when, as Aurora neared New Zealand in stormy weather on 31 March, it was in danger of being driven on the rocks. Two days later the tug Dunedin reached the ship and a towline was secured. (Note: Some sources (e.g. Shackleton, p. 333) give the tug's name as Plucky.) On the following morning, 3 April 1916, Aurora was brought into the harbour at Port Chalmers.

== Aftermath ==
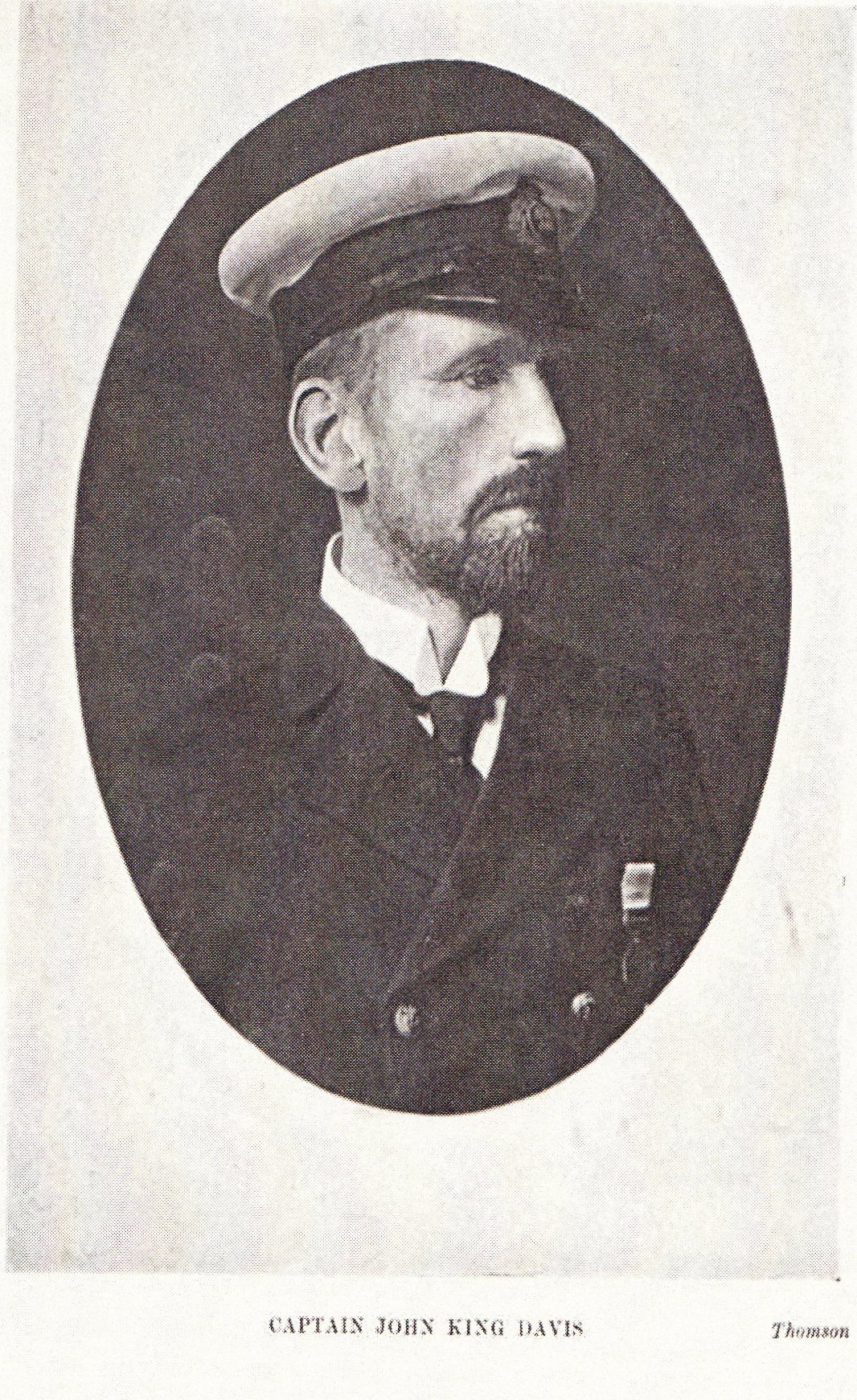
John King Davis, who captained Aurora on the relief expedition after the drift

On his arrival in New Zealand Stenhouse learned that nothing had been heard from Shackleton and the Weddell Sea party since their departure from South Georgia in December 1914; it seemed probable that both arms of the Imperial Trans-Antarctic Expedition were requiring relief. Stenhouse was informed by the expedition offices in London that funds had long since been exhausted and that money for the necessary work on Aurora would have to be found elsewhere. It was also evident that in the minds of the authorities the relief of Shackleton's party should have priority over the men marooned at Cape Evans.

Inaction continued until Shackleton's sudden reappearance at South Georgia at the beginning of June. The governments of Britain, Australia and New Zealand then agreed jointly to finance the Ross Sea relief expedition, and on 28 June work on Aurora began. Stenhouse still assumed that as de facto captain of the vessel he would lead the relief party, but the committee responsible for the refit were critical of Shackleton's initial organisation of the Ross Sea expedition. They wished to appoint their own commander for the relief expedition, and Stenhouse, as a Shackleton loyalist, was unacceptable to them. They also questioned whether Stenhouse had sufficient experience for command, citing his unfortunate choice of a winter berth. After months of uncertainty Stenhouse learned, through a newspaper account on 4 October, that John King Davis had been appointed as Aurora's new captain. (Note: Davis had considerable Antarctic experience, having been chief officer and later captain of Nimrod during the 1907–09 expedition, and captain of Aurora during the Australasian Antarctic Expedition. Béchervaise, John. "Davis, John King (1884–1967)". Australian Dictionary of Biography. National Centre of Biography, Australian National University. ISBN 978-0-522-84459-7. ISSN 1833-7538. OCLC 70677943.) Urged by Shackleton not to cooperate with this arrangement, Stenhouse turned down the post of chief officer and was discharged, along with Thompson, Donnelly and Hooke. Shackleton arrived in New Zealand too late to influence matters, beyond arranging his own appointment as a supernumerary officer on Aurora before its departure for Cape Evans on 20 December 1916.

On 10 January 1917, manned by an almost entirely new crew, Aurora arrived at Cape Evans and picked up the seven survivors of the Ross Sea shore party; Mackintosh, Victor Hayward and Arnold Spencer-Smith had all died. This was the vessel's final visit to Antarctic waters; on return to New Zealand it was sold by Shackleton to a coal carrier. Aurora left Newcastle, New South Wales, on 20 June 1917 bound for Chile, and was never seen again, posted as missing by Lloyd's of London on 2 January 1918. Among those dead were James Paton, who had acted as the ship's boatswain throughout the Ross Sea Party expedition and the drift, and on the subsequent relief mission. In 1920 King George V appointed Joseph Stenhouse an Officer of the Order of the British Empire (OBE) for his service aboard Aurora.

== Sources ==
- Béchervaise, John. "Davis, John King (1884–1967)". Australian Dictionary of Biography. National Centre of Biography, Australian National University. ISBN 978-0-522-84459-7. ISSN 1833-7538. OCLC 70677943.
- Bickel, Lennard (2001). Shackleton's Forgotten Men. London: Pimlico Original. ISBN 978-0-7126-6807-1.
- Fisher, Margery and James (1957). Shackleton. London: James Barrie Books. OCLC 1056304538.
- Haddelsey, Stephen (2008). Ice Captain. Stroud, Gloucestershire: The History Press. ISBN 978-0-7509-4348-2.
- Huntford, Roland (1985). Shackleton. London: Hodder & Stoughton. ISBN 978-0-340-25007-5.
- [The New York Times] (29 March 1916). "Marooned Men Have Food Supplies" (PDF). The New York Times.
- [The New York Times] (14 May 1916). "Aurora Sent Word by Wireless Freak" (PDF). The New York Times.
- Shackleton, Ernest (1983). South. London: Century Publishing. ISBN 978-0-7126-0111-5.
- Tyler-Lewis, Kelly (2007). The Lost Men. London: Bloomsbury Publishing. ISBN 978-0-7475-7972-4.
