= Ernest Wild =

British explorer

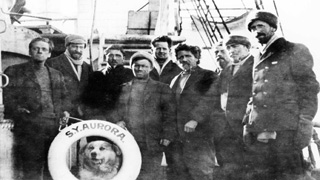
Survivors of the Ross Sea party aboard Aurora. Ernest Wild is the short figure, fourth from left

Henry Ernest Wild AM (10 August 1879 – 10 March 1918), known as Ernest Wild, was a British Royal Naval seaman and Antarctic explorer, a younger brother of Frank Wild. Unlike his more renowned brother, who went south on five occasions, Ernest Wild made only a single trip to the Antarctic, as a member of the Ross Sea party in support of Sir Ernest Shackleton's Imperial Trans-Antarctic Expedition, 1914–17. He was one of the group of ten who were stranded ashore when the expedition's ship was blown from its moorings in a gale and were forced to improvise in order to survive. He played a full part in the party's main depot-laying journey, 1915–16, and in recognition of his efforts to save the lives of two comrades on that journey, he was posthumously awarded the Albert Medal. Having survived the expedition, he died while on active service with the Royal Navy in the Mediterranean Sea on 10 March 1918 in what was then Bighi naval hospital, Kalkara, Malta and is buried at the British Naval Cemetery close by.

== Early life ==
Ernest Wild was one of eight brothers of whom Frank was the eldest. The family came from Skelton, North Yorkshire, close to Marton, birthplace of Captain James Cook, to whom the family claimed relationship, Mrs Wild having been born Mary Cook, but no positive connection has been established. Ernest followed Frank into the Navy in 1894 and remained in service for 20 years before joining the Ross Sea party.

== Ross Sea party, 1914–1917 ==
Wild sailed to Antarctica on SY Aurora in December 1914, under the command of Captain Aeneas Mackintosh. Among the expedition's members was Ernest Joyce, the only member of the party with significant experience of Antarctic conditions. The party's mission was to lay depots on the Great Ice Barrier, to support a group led by Shackleton which would be crossing the continent from the Weddell Sea. The Ross Sea party's base was established at Cape Evans in McMurdo Sound, and the expedition ship Aurora was anchored there.

Wild maintained a diary during his stay and at times he felt predisposed to write, penning paragraph after paragraph describing what had gone on over the previous few days, or weeks. At other times he would hardly make a diary entry for a month, apart from a very brief note with no more than a sentence or two to mention one feature of his day. He seemed to have the ability to look at the lighter side of life, even after struggling all day hauling a heavy sledge, or lying in the tent eking out diminishing food rations, or when he had severe frost-bite in his toes, and even when he was in a life-threatening situation. Wild was very direct in what he wrote and was not afraid to say what he thought, particularly in regard to Mackintosh.

After participating in the first season's hasty depot-laying journey in January–March 1915, Wild suffered severe frostbite resulting in the amputation of part of a toe and the top of an ear. At this time Mackintosh wrote:

On one occasion when I woke up this morning I found poor Wild rubbing his bare feet in an attempt to bring his big toe round which has ‘gone’. He is always suffering from one or the other of his feet. But he takes it philosophically and is very amusing when he gets up to say ‘It’s the left foot now, presently it may have been the right’. He says he has scarcely any feeling in them for the past 24 hours. I felt them and gave them a bit of a rub. Indeed they were cold.

On 7 May 1915 Aurora, still holding most of the shore party's equipment and stores, was blown out to sea during a gale and was unable to return. Subsequently, Wild and Ernest Joyce showed considerable resourcefulness in fabricating clothes and equipment from materials left over from Scott's Terra Nova expedition (which had used this base 1910–1913). As a morale booster, for the diehard smokers in the party Wild concocted a mixture ("Hut Point Mixture") of tea, coffee, sawdust, sennegrass and dried herbs. In the straitened circumstances in which the party found itself, Wild was a universally popular figure – "a cheerful, willing soul", according to Mackintosh.

On the 1915–16 depot-laying journey two three-man teams made the long march from "Rocky Mountain depot" at 80°S to the foot of the Beardmore Glacier. Wild was initially teamed with Mackintosh and Arnold Spencer-Smith, the party's Chaplain and photographer. Ernest Joyce, Richard W Richards and Victor Hayward formed the other team. As the two parties moved south, conditions worsened and the men's physical condition weakened. Eventually the two groups combined into a single unit. Close to the glacier Spencer-Smith collapsed, and thereafter had to be carried on the sledge. After the last depot had been laid Mackintosh became lame and unable to pull, and the entire team, including Wild, developed scurvy. On 25 January 1916, just before the final depot was laid, Wild wrote: "Just 12 months today since we left the ship. It is the longest time I have been off a ship for over 20 years."

The stricken party, having fulfilled all its depot-laying duties, struggled back towards its base in awful weather, Wild nursing Spencer-Smith who had become helpless. He died before the base was reached. The remaining five reached the safety of Hut Point and slowly recovered their strength. On 8 May 1916 Mackintosh and Hayward risked walking on the sea ice in an attempt to reach Cape Evans, but disappeared during a blizzard and were never seen again. Joyce, Richards and Wild had walked up to the top of a small hill to watch the two men head north, and Wild's final diary comment on their departure was: "If the other two get lost, I shall be sorry we humped them back here over the barrier. However, let’s hope they get there alright." Wild and the other survivors were rescued in January 1917.

== Afterwards ==
In 1917 Wild returned to naval duty on HMS Pembroke, later transferring to HMS Biarritz. He died on 10 March 1918 in the Royal Naval Hospital, Malta, after contracting typhoid. He is buried in the Commonwealth War Grave Commission's plot in the Kalkara Naval Cemetery (also known as the Capuccini Naval Cemetery). In 1923 he was posthumously awarded the Albert Medal for his efforts to save the lives of Mackintosh and Spencer-Smith. An unassuming man, he published no diaries or records of his Antarctic experiences. Alexander Stevens, who had been chief scientist on the Ross Sea party, paid him this tribute: "There are some things that have great value but no glitter. Consistent...long-suffering, patient, industrious, good-humoured, unswervingly loyal, he made an enormous contribution to our well-being".

== Sources ==
- Bickel, Lennard: Shackleton's Lost Men Random House, London 2001 ISBN 0-7126-6807-1
- Fisher:, M and J: Shackleton James Barrie Books, London 1957
- Huntford, Roland: Shackleton Hodder & Stoughton, London 1985 ISBN 0-340-25007-0
- McOrist, Wilson Shackleton's Heroes The Robson Press, an imprint of Biteback Publishing, London, 2015 ISBN 978-1-84954-815-1
- Tyler-Lewis, Kelly: The Lost Men Bloomsbury Publications, London 2007 ISBN 978-0-7475-7972-4
