= Richard W. Richards =

Australian Antarctic explorer (1894–1986)

Richard Walter Richards, GC (14 November 1894 – 8 May 1986) was teaching at the Ballarat Junior Technical School in Victoria in 1914, having studied science and mathematics at the University of Melbourne. He then joined Sir Ernest Shackleton's Imperial Trans-Antarctic Expedition in December as a physicist with the Ross Sea Party under Captain Aeneas Mackintosh. Richards was 22 years old when SY Aurora sailed from Hobart. He was to outlive all other members of the expedition, and became the last survivor of the so-called "Heroic Age" of Antarctic exploration, dying at the age of 91 in 1986.

== Early life ==
Richards was born in 1893 on November 14 and as a boy he lived in Daly Street, Long Gully, a tiny rural community about three miles from the city of Bendigo, Victoria. His parents were Richard Roberts Richards and Louise Alice Richards (nee Philpott.) He was schooled at Bendigo High School, before going on to study mathematics and science at the University of Melbourne.

== With the Ross Sea Party ==
Not knowing of Shackleton’s aborted attempt to land on the opposite side of the continent, the Ross Sea Party established base at a hut in McMurdo Sound in the Ross Sea and made preparations for their sledging journey. They put down two depots in the late summer of 1915 and then, after the winter of 1915, they laid depots 70 miles apart, all the way to the Beardmore Glacier. Richards was the lone Australian with five Englishmen in the final depot laying party; called the “Mount Hope Party”, because the most southerly depot was placed at Mount Hope, 360 miles from their base at McMurdo Sound. The others in the party were Aeneas Mackintosh, Ernest Joyce, Arnold Spencer-Smith, Victor Hayward and Ernest Wild. In his book “South” Ernest Shackleton singled out Richards, along with Joyce and Wild, as heroes. Shackleton wrote:

Mackintosh and Hayward owed their lives on that journey to the unremitting care and strenuous endeavours of Joyce, Wild, and Richards, who, also scurvy-stricken but fitter than their comrades, dragged them through the deep snow and blizzards on the sledges.

On their struggle to return to McMurdo Sound after laying the final depots, Richards, as a 22-year-old, shouldered a share of the leadership when Mackintosh started to falter, and when critical decisions had to be made. He and Joyce were the two men to pull the party through at the most life-threatening times. They steered the party in blizzard conditions. On the trek out to Mount Hope Richards made the decision to take bearings on back cairns to give them a direction to steer by on their return journey. It was he (with Joyce and Hayward) who had the strength of mind to make a move after being tent bound for six days, to find a food depot and return to rescue Mackintosh, Spencer-Smith and Wild. He was one of the three men with the will-power to drag Mackintosh and Hayward to safety.

The young man's thoughts, on 28 February 1916, when he Joyce and Hayward were searching for the tent of Mackintosh, Spencer-Smith and Wild, during a blizzard, leap out from a diary note he made then:

7pm. Afternoon passed with no break in weather. Heavy snow and moderate wind. Can see nothing. Have shouted but no response. We are standing by ready to start on the instant. I am watching the weather while Joyce and Hayward are trying to get a little sleep but with not much success. I know I cannot sleep with the thought of these men starving and cold within perhaps a very short distance of help. One keeps wondering how it will all end.

Richards had learned sledging and polar travel techniques from Ernest Joyce whom Richards admired. It was Richards who had first noticed the disappearance of the Aurora during a gale on 6 May 1915, and coincidentally he was the first to sight her on her return, 20 months later. Richards observed the deaths of Arnold Spencer-Smith, Victor Hayward and Mackintosh during the journey back from the Beardmore, and was thereafter confined to his bunk for several weeks, suffering from exhaustion and depression.

== Post-expedition career ==
After rescue in January 1917, and his return to Australia, Richards taught at the School of Mines and Industry at Ballarat. After acting as a government adviser on optical apparatus during World War II he returned to Ballarat in 1948, as Principal of the College, retiring in 1958. During his later years he was frequently consulted by historians and chroniclers of polar exploration, often expressing his views in trenchant terms. He maintained the view that, though the depot-laying journey was ultimately unnecessary, it was not futile, but was a demonstration of what the human spirit could accomplish in adversity.

== Honours and memorials ==
Richard Richards was awarded the Albert Medal in 1923 for his efforts on the ice to save the lives of Spencer-Smith and Mackintosh, this award being converted in 1971 to the George Cross, an exchange offered to all Albert Medal holders then living. He is further commemorated by the Richards Inlet at 83°20′S 168°30′E, and also by the Richard W Richards Medal at the Ballarat College of Advanced Education.There is plaque honouring Richards at George Cross Memorial Park in Campbell in the ACT.

It is reported that Richards signed up for the Trans-Antarctic Expedition without any discussion of payment, and that on his return he received the sum of £70.

== Sources ==
- Lennard Bickel: Shackleton's Forgotten Men, Random House 2000
- Lennard Bickel interview with Richard Richards 1976: https://nla.gov.au/nla.obj-215116229/listen
- M&J Fisher: Shackleton (biog.) James Barrie Books 1957
- Hebblethwaite, Marion (2007). One Step Further: Those Whose Gallantry Was Rewarded with the George Cross – Book N & R. Witney, Oxfordshire: Chamoleon HH Publishing. ISBN 978-0-9546917-8-3.
- Roland Huntford: Shackleton (biog.) Hodder & Stoughton 1985
- McOrist, Wilson The Boy From Long Gully Big Sky Publishing ISBN 978-1922488695
- McOrist, Wilson Shackleton's Heroes The Robson Press, an imprint of Biteback Publishing, London, 2015 ISBN 978-1-84954-815-1
- Ernest Shackleton: South Century Ltd edition, Ed Peter King 1991
