= Victor Hayward =

British explorer in Antarctica

Victor George Hayward AM (23 October 1887 – 8 May 1916) was a London-born accounts clerk whose taste for adventure took him to Antarctica as a member of Sir Ernest Shackleton's Imperial Trans-Antarctic Expedition, 1914–17. He had previously spent time working on a ranch in northern Canada and this experience, combined with his "do-anything" attitude, was sufficient for him to be engaged by Shackleton as a general assistant to the Ross Sea party, a support group with a mission to lay depots for the main cross-continental party.

Hayward quickly proved himself to be hard-working and resourceful. He was one of the ten members of the shore party that was marooned when the Ross Sea party's expedition ship Aurora broke from its McMurdo Sound moorings during a storm and was unable to return. In difficult circumstances he played a full part in the efforts of the stranded group to fulfil its mission, despite its shortages of food, proper clothing, and equipment. During the main depot-laying journey on the Great Ice Barrier in 1915–1916 Hayward was one of the six who marched to the Beardmore Glacier to lay the last of the required chain of depots. On the return leg the party was struck with scurvy, which caused the death of Arnold Spencer-Smith. Although suffering badly himself, Hayward helped bring the rest of the party off the Barrier to the relative safety of the Hut Point shelter.

Hayward disappeared on 8 May 1916 while walking across the frozen surface of McMurdo Sound in the hopes of reaching the expedition's base at Cape Evans. His body was never found. Seven years later Hayward was posthumously awarded the Albert Medal for his efforts to save the lives of his stricken companions on the Barrier journey.

== Early life ==
Victor George Hayward was born 23 October 1887 at 5 Manor Park Road, Harlesden, North London. He was the 12th of 14 children of Francis Checkley Hayward and Mary Jane Fairchild. His father became a senior executive of the London and North Western Railway. Hayward was educated at an Essex boarding school, and after attending a London business college was employed as an accounts clerk in the City. From an early age he had been fascinated by stories of adventure, a particular favourite, acquired as a Sunday School prize, being R M Ballantyne's The World of Ice, or Adventures in the Polar Regions. Unprepared for a life of "bourgeois complacency", Hayward took leave from his employers to spend seven months working on a ranch in northern Canada. On his return he found settling back into an office routine difficult, and applied to Shackleton's office for a position on the newly announced Trans-Antarctic expedition. His offer to "do anything" secured him his place in the Ross Sea party.

== Ross Sea party ==
=== First season ===
The Ross Sea party's expedition ship Aurora arrived in Antarctica in January 1915. During the short season before the onset of winter Hayward volunteered for everything—helping Ernest Joyce with the dogs, assisting the motor tractor party and man-hauling depot supplies on the Barrier. When the shore party was marooned after Aurora was blown from her moorings, Hayward became an accomplished seal hunter, helping to boost the party's depleted stocks of food. Described as a "quiet, brawny man", Hayward's closest bond was formed with the party's leader, Aeneas Mackintosh, with whom he shared a common yearning for home and loved ones. Mackintosh had recently married, Hayward was engaged to be married.

Hayward's expedition diary is a fascinating document. He writes most of the time for his fiancée. He pens over 24,000 words in a day-by-day record of his stay in Antarctica, in exquisite detail at times, and in a unique style. Where the other men appear to be recording their diaries for anyone to read, Hayward's diary is very personal. Not only does his love for his fiancée come through, but he exposes his innermost thoughts, especially in the early stages of his time in Antarctica. He tells her of what happens almost every day, on the march, in the tent and in the hut so we have a wonderful picture from his diary of what he and the others experienced. His diary pages are brightened by occasional sketches. Some are of his fiancée, and others of the scenery, the Aurora and penguins. There are even images unrelated to Antarctica: horses, a Canadian Mountie on horseback, a man with a monocle in his left eye looking resplendent in a top hat and formal attire and other men with different hats. His education and upbringing shows through in some of the phrases and words he uses. He describes his life at times as a 'ducky life', calls a short sleep '40 winks', uses the term 'by jingo' to express his surprise at something, calls an argument a 'roar' and often describes something as 'jolly nice'. He uses a phrase 'the bally thing didn't budge' when trying to move a sledge whereas others would write 'd _ _ d hard work' or use untutored grammar with a note: 'We struggled on + on'. Hayward's diary even contains a 30-line poem that he and his tent mates made up. He includes quotes from the book Lorna Doone and a full menu of two 'champagne' suppers he plans to have with his fiancée when he returns. However, as Hayward weakens with scurvy, his 400 and 500-word daily diary entries in his first sledging season dry up. In 1916, as he struggles back to Hut Point, his diary note each day is often nothing more than a few numbers; of the distance covered in the day, and the number of miles remaining to reach Hut Point. The complete diary has been reproduced in the book Shackleton's Heroes.

=== Second season ===
The main depot-laying journey of the expedition began in September 1915. Although privately recording that he thought the programme to be followed "impossible", Hayward threw his physical might into the job. He was one of the party of six that undertook the longest stage of the depot-laying journey, from 80°S to the Beardmore Glacier. This journey was completed on 26 January 1916. On the return journey Mackintosh and parson/photographer Arnold Spencer-Smith fell victims to scurvy and had to be carried on the sledge, drawn by Joyce, Ernest Wild, Dick Richards and Hayward. When the food situation became acute Hayward, by now showing scurvy symptoms himself, nevertheless went forward with Joyce and Richards to obtain life-saving food and fuel for the rest of the party. At this time, Hayward wrote:

"I should mention that we are all, more or less, suffering from scurvy, our gums being much swollen. I feel it very badly in the limbs particularly in the groin, knees & ankles; the only cure of course is a diet of fresh meat & this we cannot procure till we get in, so one sees the vital necessity of quick progress."

Eventually, after suffering both physical and mental breakdown, Hayward was lashed to the sledge and on 18 March was hauled to the shelter at Hut Point where, since the doorway was iced up, he was hoisted in through the window. Spencer-Smith died and was buried in the ice; Mackintosh barely survived. Joyce had expected Hayward to die, but he too survived.

=== Disappearance ===
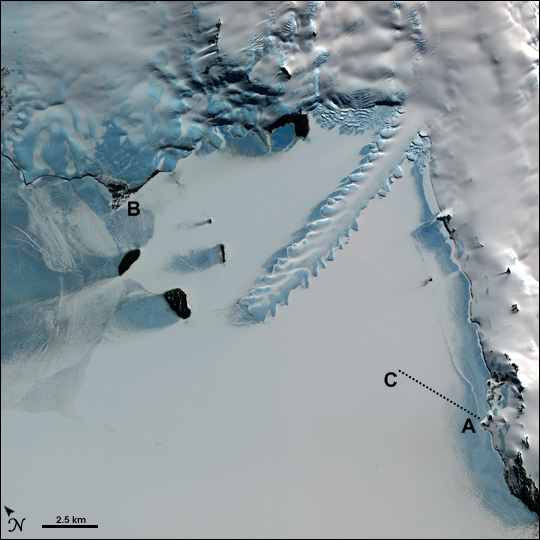
McMurdo Sound, frozen over. Mackintosh and Hayward set out on 8 May 1916 from Hut Point (A), intending to walk across the ice to Cape Evans (B). They disappeared in the area marked C.

Helped by a diet of seal—plentifully available around Hut Point—the party slowly recovered. Mackintosh was anxious that as soon as possible they make the final stage of the return journey—the 13 miles (21 km) across the frozen surface of McMurdo Sound to the base at Cape Evans. The ice would not be safe until winter set in, in June or July, but Mackintosh and Hayward grew impatient. In early May they had recovered sufficiently to begin testing the ice. On 8 May Mackintosh announced that he and Hayward intended to walk across to Cape Evans, and against the urgent pleadings of Joyce, Richards and Wild, they set out at 1:00 p.m., carrying only light supplies. Two hours later a blizzard swept over the Sound and they were lost from view. They did not arrive at Cape Evans, and no trace of their bodies was ever found, nor was the nature of their fate established. They may have fallen through the ice, or been carried out to sea when the ice broke up. If by chance they had managed to reach the temporary safety of land they would have been cut off, without hope either of returning to Hut Point or reaching Cape Evans, and would have perished from hypothermia.

== Albert Medal ==
After the remainder of the Hut Point party had crossed to Cape Evans in mid-July a series of searches instituted by Joyce failed to establish the fate of Mackintosh and Hayward. Further searches took place when Aurora finally returned to relieve the party, in January 1917. A memorial cross was erected to Spencer-Smith, Mackintosh and Hayward at Wind Vane Hill, a weather observation post near Cape Evans.

Seven years after their struggle on the ice, in belated recognition, on 4 July 1923 Joyce, Richards, Wild and Hayward (the last two posthumously, Wild having died on active service in 1918) were awarded the Albert Medal, in recognition of their efforts to save the lives of Mackintosh and Spencer-Smith on the Barrier.
