= Joan Spencer-Smith =

Anglican deaconess, lecturer

Joan Elizabeth Spencer-Smith (1891–1965) was a notable New Zealand Anglican deaconess and lecturer. She was born in London, England in 1891. Her brother was the Rev. Arnold Spencer-Smith chaplain and photographer to Shackleton's Imperial Trans-Antarctic Expedition.

Joan Elizabeth Spencer Smith was born at London, England, on 27 June 1891, the daughter of Charlotte Owen Gaze and her husband, Charles Spencer Smith, clerk and receiver of the United Westminster Schools and Grey Coat Hospital. Nothing is known of Joan's education before her three years of study at honours level for the diploma of student in theology, conferred by the archbishop of Canterbury in March 1915. She then taught divinity in a secondary school for girls, and in 1917 gained the archbishop's licence to teach theology. During the 1920s she was a tutor for the London Diocesan Board of Women's Work. She lectured church workers, including Church Army candidates, organised and gave lectures to women's fellowships in parishes, and conducted tutorials.

In New Zealand at this time there was little provision for Anglican women to train for full-time church work. Campbell West-Watson, the bishop of Christchurch, hoped for the 'firmer establishment of the Diaconate for women', and in 1929 a diocesan commission argued for the setting up of a deaconess training institution in Christchurch. While in London for the Lambeth Conference in 1930, West-Watson was referred to Joan Spencer Smith, who offered to head the training school on a voluntary basis. She was formally invited in 1931 after General Synod approved the Lambeth resolutions and regulations on deaconesses and called for a wider appreciation by the church of women's ministry.

This 'lady of learning, piety, and some private means' arrived in Christchurch in May 1931. There she became known as Joan Spencer-Smith. For a year the women's training house was based at the deanery, and then at Bishop Julius Hostel. The five residential students were joined at evening lectures by growing numbers of non-residential students, attracted by Spencer-Smith's lucid teaching on the Old Testament and doctrine. This wider interest reflected the name given: St Faith's House of Sacred Learning. St. Faith's was housed in premises made available by the poet Ursula Bethell

Spencer-Smith and local clergy gave courses of lectures leading to one-year and two-year certificates. Students came from every diocese except Waikato, and Spencer-Smith helped isolated students by correspondence. St Faith's also offered short courses and provided spiritual and intellectual refreshment for visitors, including missionaries on furlough.

The first deaconess to be trained by Spencer-Smith was ordained in April 1932, and the following year, on 1 November, she herself was ordained and licensed as head deaconess. Tall and statuesque, she wore a simple navy-blue deaconess dress with white collar and dark veil. Known for her sure vision, serene wisdom and calm confidence, she was a woman of strong convictions, yet had a twinkle in her eye. She was soon giving devotional training to lay people and teaching them subjects such as biblical criticism, which otherwise were only offered in the theological colleges. The principal of College House, Christchurch, sent male theological students to her for some of their lectures, and in the 1940s she lectured on the Old Testament at College House.

In May 1935 St Faith's House opened in permanent quarters in a house in Merivale, gifted to the church by the poet Ursula Bethell. However, because of the depression, the diocese could no longer offer candidates bursaries of £50 and Spencer-Smith met the expenses. By 1936 there had been 22 trainees and residents.

Spencer-Smith had special leave in 1937 to be acting head deaconess of St Hilda's House in Melbourne, followed by a short holiday in England. There were few applicants for St Faith's in 1938 and then the Second World War intervened. Enrolments were also affected by the lack of openings in the Anglican church for the women who had completed their training. Spencer-Smith nonetheless started planning for her successor, preferably a New Zealand woman, to be trained in Australia.

In 1943 she was invited to be the first principal of a national women's training college in Melbourne. She resigned from St Faith's, confident that the work would continue under a new head. However, her appointment was cancelled later that year, as the college opening was postponed. Although West-Watson and others reported that St Faith's had closed, Joan Spencer-Smith publicly declared that the work of training women church workers was only in abeyance until a principal and her salary were found. St Faith's never re-opened. After Bethell's death in 1945, the house was sold and, in accordance with her wishes, the interest from the proceeds was used to fund women seeking deaconess and further theological training in England.

During the war Spencer-Smith pioneered (with Doreen Warren) ecumenical work among women through the newly formed National Council of Churches in New Zealand (NCC) and its Campaign for Christian Order. Joan chaired the Women's Campaign Committee from 1942 to 1944 and its successor, the Women's Committee of the NCC, from 1944 to 1947. She also instigated the publication of annual women's studies for use by home-based discussion groups exploring the relevance of Christianity. This pioneering of group work among lonely young mothers was recognised as a major contribution by the international ecumenical movement.

Joan Spencer-Smith had been a lay member of the Christchurch synod in 1941: deaconesses were ordained, but not recognised as members of the clergy. In 1944, when she took her seat at the all-male NCC annual meeting, she argued that member churches should nominate women and lay people to represent them on the council since they, as much as clergy, were the church. The churches were not yet ready for such an audacious suggestion. In preparing a report for an international ecumenical study, she was forthright in discussing not only the lack of opportunities for deaconesses to administer the sacraments, but also other disincentives to professional women's church work.

In 1947, for health and family reasons, Joan Spencer-Smith returned to England, where she lived with her sister in Bury St Edmunds. She left New Zealand, disappointed that the church did not fully acknowledge women's gifts of ministry. She never married, and died in London on 10 April 1965. The following year a new diocesan training house for deaconesses was established in Auckland.

External links and sources More suggestions and sources Obit. Press. 3 May 1965: 2

Parr, S. Canterbury pilgrimage. Christchurch, 1951

Simpson, J. M. R. 'Liberal Christianity and the changing role of women in New Zealand society: a study of the National Council of Churches and the League of Mothers, 1939 to 1959'. PhD thesis, Otago, 1992

How to cite this page: Jane Simpson. 'Spencer-Smith, Joan Elizabeth', Dictionary of New Zealand Biography, first published in 1998. Te Ara - the Encyclopedia of New Zealand, https://teara.govt.nz/en/biographies/4s39/spencer-smith-joan-elizabeth (accessed 8 February 2019)

All text licensed under the Creative Commons Attribution-NonCommercial 3.0 New Zealand Licence ( http://creativecommons.org/licenses/by-nc/3.0/nz/deed.en). Commercial re-use may be allowed on request. All non-text content is subject to specific conditions. © Crown Copyright.
