= Aeneas Mackintosh =

British officer and explorer (1879–1916)

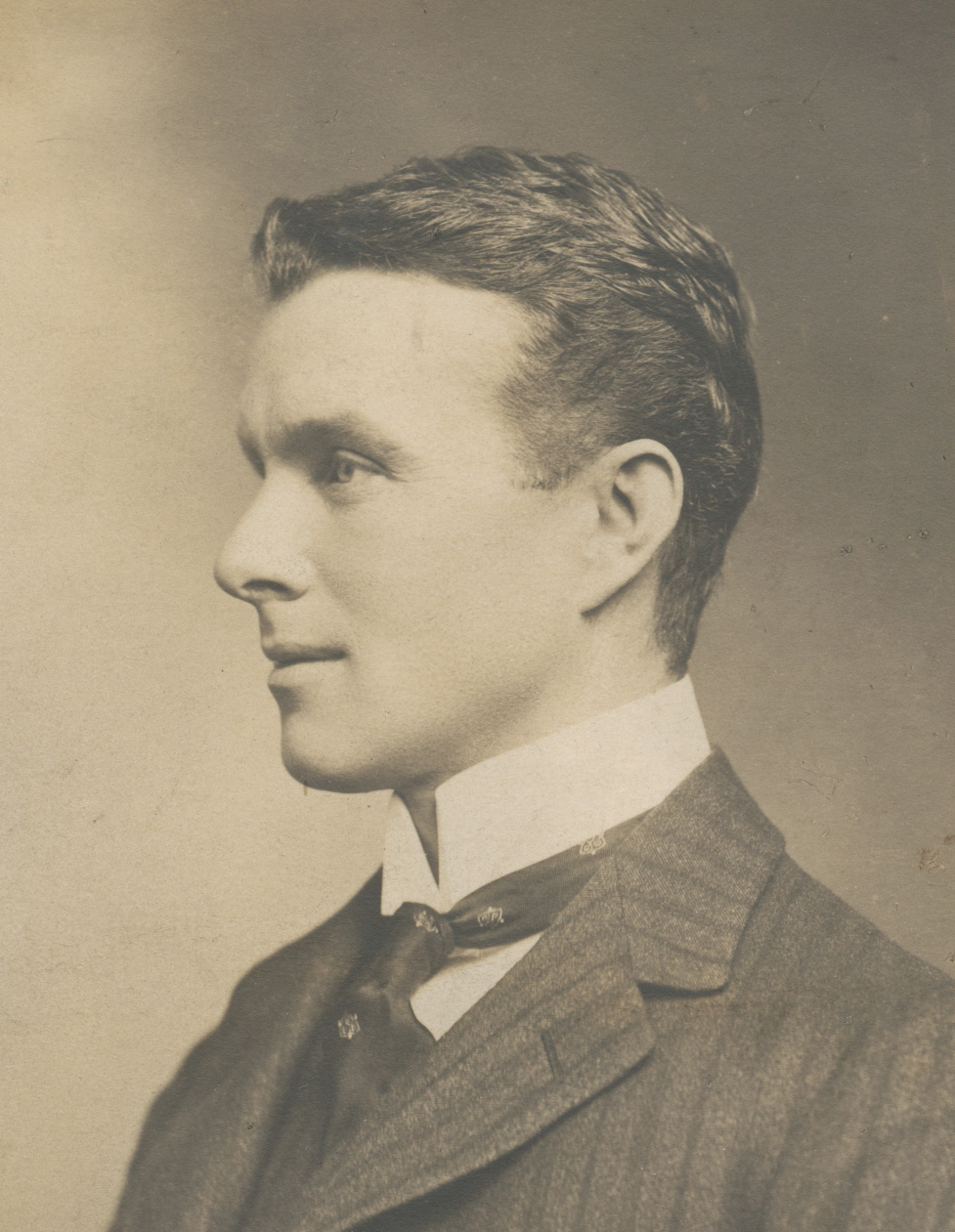
- Born: Aeneas Lionel Acton Mackintosh; 1 July 1879; Tirhut, British India
- Died: 8 May 1916 (aged 36); McMurdo Sound, Antarctica
- Education: Bedford Modern School
- Occupations: Merchant naval officer; Antarctic explorer
- Spouse: Gladys Campbell (m. 1912)
- Children: 2

Aeneas Lionel Acton Mackintosh (1 July 1879 – 8 May 1916) was a British Merchant Navy officer and Antarctic explorer who commanded the Ross Sea party as part of Sir Ernest Shackleton's Imperial Trans-Antarctic Expedition, 1914–1917. The Ross Sea party's mission was to support Shackleton's proposed transcontinental march by laying supply depots along the latter stages of the march's intended route. In the face of persistent setbacks and practical difficulties, Mackintosh's party fulfilled its task, although he and two others died in the course of their duties.

Mackintosh's first Antarctic experience was as second officer on Shackleton's Nimrod expedition, 1907–1909. Shortly after his arrival in the Antarctic, a shipboard accident destroyed his right eye, and he was sent back to New Zealand. He returned in 1909 to participate in the later stages of the expedition; his will and determination in adversity impressed Shackleton, and led to his Ross Sea party appointment in 1914.

Having brought his party to the Antarctic, Mackintosh was faced with numerous difficulties. Confused and vague orders meant he was uncertain of the timing of Shackleton's proposed march. His problems were compounded when the party's ship, SY Aurora, was swept from its winter moorings during a gale and was unable to return, causing the loss of vital equipment and supplies. In carrying out the party's depot-laying task, one man died; Mackintosh barely survived, owing his life to the actions of his comrades who brought him to safety. Restored to health, he and a companion disappeared while attempting to return to the expedition's base camp by crossing the unstable sea ice.

Mackintosh's competence and leadership skills have been questioned by polar historians. Shackleton commended the work of the party, and equated the sacrifice of their lives to those given in the trenches of the First World War, but was critical of Mackintosh's organising skills. Years later, Shackleton's son, Lord Shackleton, identified Mackintosh as one of the expedition's heroes, alongside Ernest Joyce and Dick Richards.

== Early life ==
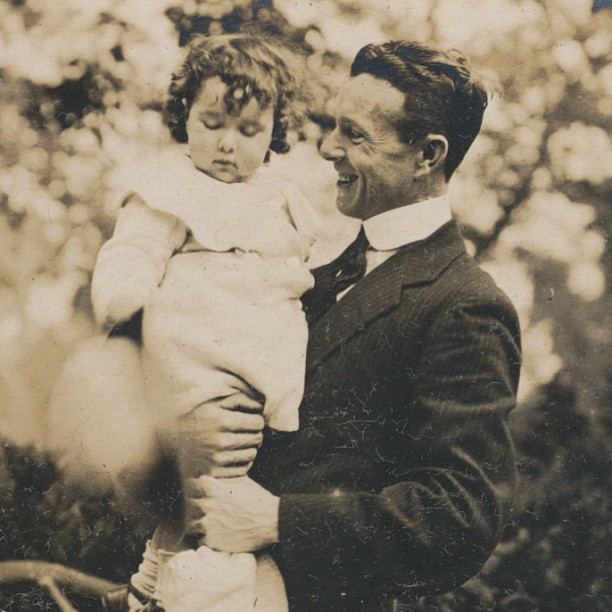
Mackintosh with his daughter, Pamela, c. 1912

Mackintosh was born in Tirhut (in what was then British India), on 1 July 1879. He was one of six children (five sons and a daughter) of a Scottish indigo planter, Alexander Mackintosh, a descendant from the chieftains of Clan Chattan. Aeneas would in due course be named as an heir to the chieftainship, and to the ancient seat at Inverness that went with it. When Aeneas was still a young child, his mother, Annie Mackintosh, suddenly returned to Britain, bringing the children with her. The reasons for the family rift are unknown, but it was evidently permanent. His father had Bright's disease and remained in India. Mackintosh never saw him again but remained fond of him, writing regularly; his father kept every letter but they were found unopened when his father died. At home in Bedfordshire, Mackintosh attended Bedford Modern School. He then followed the same path as had Ernest Shackleton five years earlier, leaving school at the age of 16 to go to sea. After serving a tough Merchant Officer's apprenticeship, he joined P&O, and remained with this company until he was recruited by Shackleton's Nimrod expedition, which sailed for Antarctica in 1907. Before the expedition's departure Mackintosh was commissioned as a sub lieutenant in the Royal Naval Reserve.

== Nimrod Expedition ==
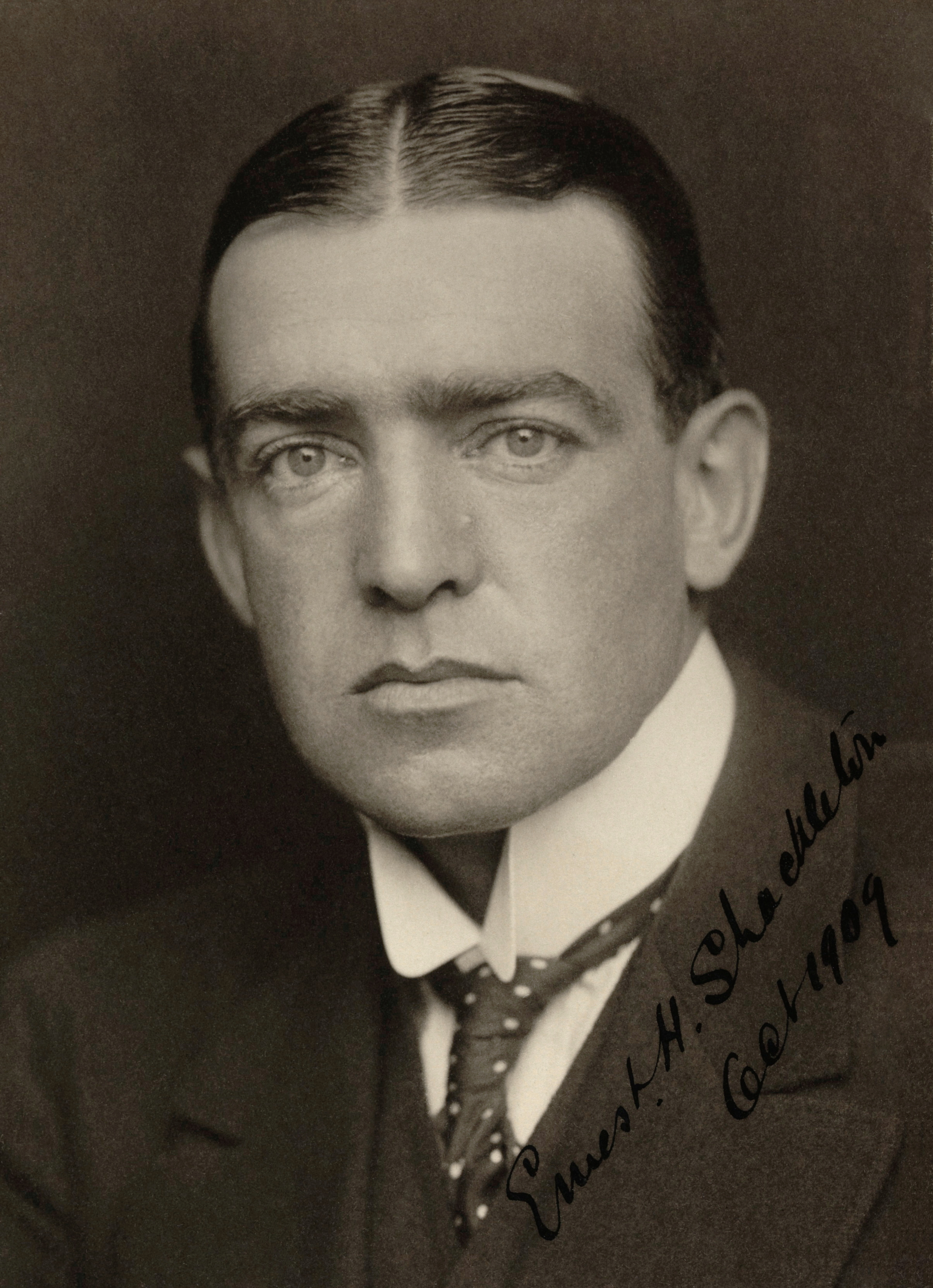
Ernest Shackleton, leader of the Nimrod Expedition

The Nimrod Expedition, 1907–1909, was the first of three Antarctic expeditions led by Ernest Shackleton. Its objective, as stated by Shackleton, was to "proceed to the Ross Quadrant of the Antarctic with a view to reaching the Geographical South Pole and the South Magnetic Pole". Mackintosh was recommended to Shackleton as a suitable officer by the P & O Line, and soon earned Shackleton's confidence while impressing his fellow-officers with his will and determination. While the expedition was in New Zealand, Shackleton added Mackintosh to the shore party, as a likely candidate for the polar march. On 31 January 1908, not long after Nimrod's arrival at McMurdo Sound in the Antarctic, Mackintosh was assisting in the transfer of sledging gear aboard ship when a hook swung across the deck and struck his right eye, virtually destroying it. He was immediately taken to the captain's cabin where, later that day, expedition doctor Eric Marshall operated to remove the eye, using partly improvised surgical equipment. Marshall was deeply impressed by Mackintosh's fortitude, observing that "no man could have taken it better."

The accident cost Mackintosh his place on the shore party, and required his return to New Zealand for further treatment. He took no part in the main events of the expedition, but returned south with Nimrod in January 1909, to participate in the closing stages. Shackleton, who had earlier fallen out with the ship's master, Rupert England, had wanted Mackintosh to captain Nimrod on this voyage, but the eye injury had not healed sufficiently to make this appointment possible. On 1 January 1909, on its return to Antarctica, Nimrod was stopped by the ice, still 25 miles (40 km) from the expedition's shore base at Cape Royds. Mackintosh decided that he would cross this stretch of ice on foot. Historian Beau Riffenburgh describes the journey that followed as "one of the most ill-considered parts of the entire expedition". Mackintosh's party, which left the ship on the morning of 3 January, consisted of Mackintosh and three sailors, with a sledge containing supplies and a large mailbag. Two sailors quickly returned to the ship, while Mackintosh and one companion went forward. They camped on the ice that evening, only to find next day that the whole area around them had broken up. After a desperate dash over the moving ice floes, they managed to reach a small glacier tongue. Mackintosh later wrote about the near-death experience:

Our luck was in and we pulled the sledge a little way up the face of the ice and unpacked it. We were on terra firma! But none too soon for fifteen minutes later there was open water where we had gained the land!

They camped there, and waited for several days for their snow-blindness to subside. When their vision returned, they found that Cape Royds was in sight but inaccessible, as the sea-ice leading to it had gone, leaving a stretch of open water. They had little choice but to make for the hut by land, a dangerous undertaking without appropriate equipment and experience. On 11 January they set out. For the next 48 hours they struggled over hostile terrain, through regions of deep crevasses and treacherous snowfields. They soon parted company with all their equipment and supplies. At one point, to proceed, they had to ascend to 3,000 feet (910 m) and then slide to the foot of a snow-slope. Eventually, after stumbling around in the fog for hours, they encountered Bernard Day, a member of the shore party, a short distance from the hut. The ship later recovered the abandoned equipment. John King Davis, then serving as Nimrod's chief officer, remarked that "Mackintosh was always the man to take the hundredth chance. This time he got away with it." Mackintosh later joined Ernest Joyce and others on a journey across the Great Ice Barrier to Minna Bluff, to lay a depot for Shackleton's polar party, whose return from their southern march was awaited. On 3 March, while keeping watch on the deck of Nimrod, Mackintosh observed a flare, which signalled the safe return of Shackleton and his party. They had fallen just short of their South Pole objective, having reached a Farthest South of 88° 23' S.

== Between expeditions ==
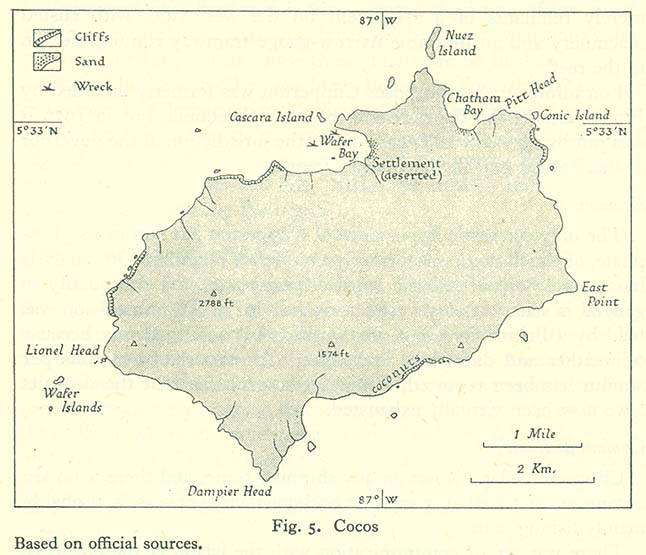
Cocos Island in the Pacific Ocean, where Mackintosh searched for treasure in 1911

Mackintosh returned to England in June 1909. On reporting to the P & O, he was informed that due to his impaired sight he was discharged. Without immediate prospects of employment, he agreed, early in 1910, to accompany Douglas Mawson (who had served as a geologist on the Nimrod expedition and was later to lead the Australasian Antarctic Expedition) on a trip to Hungary, to survey a potential goldfield which Shackleton was hoping would form the basis of a lucrative business venture. Despite a promising report from Mawson, nothing came of this. Mackintosh later launched his own treasure-hunting expedition to Cocos Island off Costa Rica's Pacific coast but again returned home empty-handed. In February 1912, Mackintosh married Gladys Campbell and settled into an office job as assistant secretary to the Imperial Merchant Service Guild in Liverpool. The safe, routine work did not satisfy him: "I am still existing at this job, stuck in a dirty office," he wrote to a former Nimrod shipmate. "I always feel I never completed my first initiation—so would like to have one final wallow, for good or bad!" He was therefore delighted, early in 1914, to receive an invitation from Shackleton to join the latter's Imperial Trans-Antarctic Expedition, which was to attempt the first transcontinental crossing of Antarctica.

== Ross Sea party ==
=== Early difficulties ===
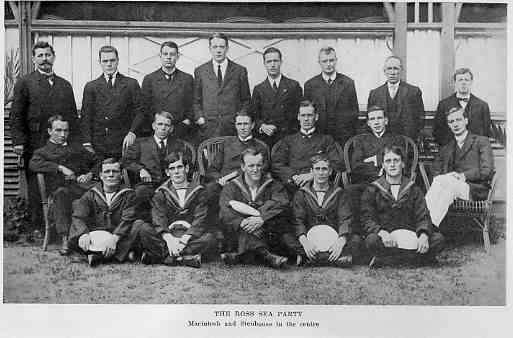
The Ross Sea party in Australia. Mackintosh is seated in the middle row, third from left. Ernest Joyce is standing, extreme left, back row. Arnold Spencer-Smith is the tall figure, centre back row.

Shackleton's expedition contained two separate components. The main party would establish a base in the Weddell Sea, from which a group of six led by Shackleton was to march across the continent, via the South Pole. A supporting Ross Sea party, based on the opposite side of the continent in McMurdo Sound, would lay supply depots across the Great Ice Barrier, to assist the transcontinental party on the final stage of its journey. Mackintosh was originally to have been a member of Shackleton's transcontinental party, but difficulties arose over the appointment of a commander for the Ross Sea party. Eric Marshall, the surgeon from the Nimrod expedition, turned the assignment down, as did John King Davis; Shackleton's efforts to obtain from the Admiralty a naval crew for this part of the enterprise were rejected. The post of Ross Sea party leader was finally offered to, and accepted by, Mackintosh. His ship would be the Aurora, lately used by Mawson's Australasian Antarctic Expedition and presently lying in Australia. Shackleton considered the Ross Sea party's assignment routine, and saw no special difficulties in its execution.

Mackintosh arrived in Australia in October 1914 to take up his duties, and was immediately faced with major difficulties. Without warning or notification, Shackleton had cut the Ross Sea party's allocated funds in half, from £2,000 to £1,000. Mackintosh was instructed to make up the difference by soliciting free gifts, and to mortgage the expedition's ship to raise further money. It then emerged that the purchase of Aurora had not been legally completed, which delayed Mackintosh's attempts to mortgage it. Also, Aurora was unfit for Antarctic work without an extensive overhaul, which required co-operation from an exasperated Australian Government. The task of dealing with these difficulties within a very restricted timescale caused Mackintosh great anxiety, and the various muddles created a negative image of the expedition in the eyes of the Australian public. Some members of the party resigned, others were dismissed; recruiting a full complement of crew and scientific staff involved some last-minute appointments which left the party noticeably short of Antarctic experience.

Shackleton had given Mackintosh the impression that he would if possible attempt his crossing during the coming 1914–1915 Antarctic season. Before departing for the Weddell Sea, he changed his mind about the feasibility of this timescale. Mackintosh was not informed of this change of plan; this misunderstanding led to the underprepared and near-chaotic depot-laying journeys of January–March 1915. Shackleton's instructions were confusing. He had told Mackintosh that it was supremely important to have the depots laid, but he also informed Mackintosh he would be carrying sufficient provisions to cross the continent unaided. It appears that Shackleton wanted Mackintosh to believe that he was not absolutely dependent on the depots. Shackleton also instructed Mackintosh to leave a fully equipped emergency lifeboat at McMurdo Sound, if Shackleton did not come across from the Weddell Sea. The emergency lifeboat specifications he gave Mackintosh in 1914 closely match those he implemented in 1916 on his famous James Caird journey.

=== Depot-laying, first season ===
Name	Rank or function
Aeneas Mackintosh	Commander
Ernest Joyce	Sledging equipment and dogs
Ernest Wild	Storekeeper
Arnold Spencer-Smith	Chaplain and photographer
John Lachlan Cope	Biologist and surgeon
Alexander Stevens	Chief scientist
Richard W. Richards	Physicist
Andrew Jack	Physicist
Irvine Gaze	General assistant
Victor Hayward	General assistant

Aurora finally left Hobart, Tasmania, on 24 December 1914. The only stop en route to Antarctica was at Macquarie Island, 950 miles from Hobart. A meteorological station had been established there during the expedition of the Australian Douglas Mawson a year or two earlier, and they were to land stores for the staff. This was the last chance for the men to send messages home. Mackintosh sent a letter to his wife telling her that his men were a 'real good lot of fellows' and it was a 'treat' to be with them. On 16 January 1915, the shore party landed at McMurdo Sound, where Mackintosh established a base camp at Captain Robert Falcon Scott's old headquarters at Cape Evans. Believing that Shackleton might have already begun his march from the Weddell Sea, he was determined to begin depot-laying at once. Joyce, the expedition's most seasoned Antarctic traveller—he had been with Scott's Discovery Expedition in 1901–1904, and with the Nimrod expedition—protested that the party needed time for acclimatisation and training, but was overruled. Joyce was shocked by the rebuff; he had expected that Mackintosh would defer to him on sledging matters: "If I had Shacks here I would make him see my way of arguing", he wrote in his diary.

The depot-laying journey which followed began with a series of mishaps. A blizzard delayed their start, a motor sledge broke down after a few miles, and Mackintosh and his group lost their way on the sea ice between Cape Evans and Hut Point. Conditions on the Barrier were harsh for the untrained and inexperienced men. Many of the stores taken on to the Barrier were dumped on the ice to reduce loads and did not reach the depots. After Mackintosh insisted, over Joyce's urgent protests, on taking the dogs all the way to 80°S, all died on the journey. A Joyce diary note at this time reveals his displeasure with Mackintosh. "I don't know how I refrain from giving Mack a bit of my mind, will have to keep that in until we get back. We will have enough to think about before we get to Hut Point." The men, frostbitten and exhausted, returned to the old Discovery expedition hut at Hut Point on 24 March, but were cut off from the ship and from their Cape Evans base by unsafe sea ice and had to wait, idle, for nearly three months.

After this experience, confidence in Mackintosh's leadership was low, and bickering rife. This statement is questionable. During the months of June, July and August at Cape Evans Mackintosh noted: "All is working smoothly here, and everyone is taking the situation very philosophically." In relation to Mackintosh's plans one of the men wrote in June: "Spent most of the morning discussing the sledging problem ... and it's a pretty big problem too, tho' I think the O.M. [Old Man – Mackintosh] has a good solution already worked out." Another of the men remembered that the ten men appeared to work well together, with no animosities. Relationships were "astonishingly good".

=== Loss of Aurora ===
SY Aurora, anchored to the Antarctic ice

When Mackintosh and the depot-laying party finally reached Cape Evans in early June, they learned that Aurora, with 18 men on board and carrying most of the shore party's supplies and equipment, had broken loose from its winter mooring during a gale. The day after Mackintosh's arrival he gave an outline of the situation to the other men. He explained the 'necessity for economy in the use of fuel, light, and stores, in view of the possibility' that they may have to stay there for two years. He wrote a diary note that they "are not going to commence work for the sledging operations until we know more definitely the fate of the 'Aurora'. I dare not think any disaster has occurred." However, ice conditions in McMurdo Sound made it impossible for the ship to return; the shore party of ten was effectively marooned, with drastically depleted resources.

Luckily, most of the stores required for the depots had been landed. Mackintosh therefore resolved that the following season's work would be carried out to the full: depots would be laid across the Great ice Barrier all the way to the Beardmore Glacier. The party would seek to make up its lack of supplies and equipment by salvaging the stores left by earlier expeditions, particularly from Captain Scott's recent sojourn at Cape Evans. The entire party pledged its support to this effort, though it would require, wrote Mackintosh, a record-breaking feat of polar travel to accomplish it. However, the long months of preparation were difficult for Mackintosh. The only officer in the party, he found it hard to form close relationships with his companions. His position became increasingly isolated, and subject to the frequent vocal criticisms of Joyce in particular.

=== March to Mount Hope ===
On 26 August 1915, Mackintosh wrote:

We had hoped to get out and see the sun rise but the sky was too overcast so we shall not have that pleasure. Anyway it is good to feel the sun is about us now. I trust before he dips again for this long spell without him, that we have experienced, we shall be in the dear Homeland. The light made us all blink, as well as to feel excitement of spirit. Personally I felt like as if I had been released from being a prisoner—or imagined what one would feel like, who had been one. I stood outside & looked at the lovely wonderful scenery all around.

These are the last diary notes of Mackintosh. He started a new diary five days later, which has never been found. On 1 September 1915, nine men in teams of three began the task of hauling approximately 5,000 pounds (2,300 kg) of stores from the Cape Evans base on to the Barrier—the scientist Alexander Stevens remained at base camp, alone. This operation was the first stage in the process of laying down depots at intervals of one-degree latitude 60 nautical miles (110 km; 69 mi), down to Mount Hope at the foot of the Beardmore Glacier. A large forward base was then established at the Bluff depot, just north of 79°, from which the final journeys to Mount Hope would be launched early in 1916. During these early stages, Mackintosh clashed repeatedly with Joyce over methods. In a showdown on 28 November, confronted with incontrovertible evidence of the greater effectiveness of Joyce's methods over his own, Mackintosh was forced to back down and accept a revised plan drafted by Joyce and Richards. Joyce's private comment was "I never in my experience came across such an idiot in charge of men."

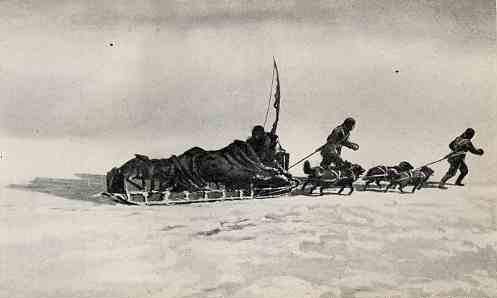
Spencer-Smith and Mackintosh being hauled on the sledge

The main march southward from the Bluff depot began on 1 January 1916. Within a few days, one team of three was forced to return to base, following the failure of their Primus stove. The other six carried on: Mackintosh, Joyce, Ernest Wild, Dick Richards, Arnold Spencer-Smith and Victor Hayward. The 80° depot laid the previous season was reinforced, and new depots were built at 81° and 82°. As the party moved on towards the vicinity of Mount Hope, both Mackintosh and Spencer-Smith, the expedition's photographer, were hobbling. Shortly after the 83° mark was passed, Spencer-Smith collapsed and was left in a tent while the others struggled on the remaining few miles. Mackintosh rejected the suggestion that he should remain with the invalid, insisting that it was his duty to ensure that every depot was laid. On 26 January, Mount Hope was attained and the final depot put in place.

On the homeward march, Spencer-Smith had to be drawn on the sledge. Mackintosh's condition was deteriorating rapidly; unable to pull, he staggered along, crippled by the growing effects of scurvy. As his condition worsened, Mackintosh was forced at intervals to join Spencer-Smith as a passenger on the sledge. Even the fitter members of the group were handicapped by frostbite, snow-blindness and scurvy, as the journey became a desperate struggle for survival. Mackintosh feared for their lives. On 28 February he wrote a long note and his words have an eerie similarity to some of Scott's last letters, and in particular to a note Scott wrote titled 'Message to the Public', as he lay dying in his tent in March 1912. Part of Mackintosh's note said:

I have this record in the event of anything happening to this party. Today we have finished the last of our food. A blizzard has been blowing 11 days. But I leave it on record all have done their duty nobly & well. This is all I can say & if it is God's will that we should here give up we do so in the true British fashion my own tradition holds us in power to do.

On 8 March, Mackintosh volunteered to remain in the tent while the others tried to get Spencer-Smith to the relative safety of Hut Point. Spencer-Smith died the next day. Richards, Wild and Joyce struggled on to Hut Point with the now stricken Hayward, before returning to rescue Mackintosh. By 18 March, all five survivors were recuperating at Hut Point, having completed what Shackleton's biographers Marjory and James Fisher describe as "one of the most remarkable, and apparently impossible, feats of endurance in the history of polar travel."

=== Disappearance and death ===
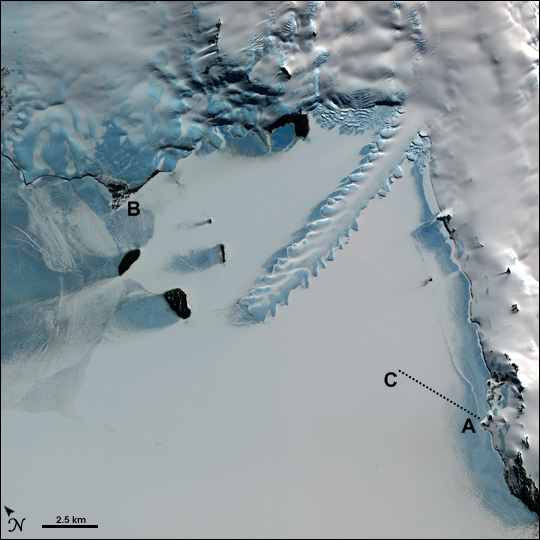
McMurdo Sound, frozen over. Mackintosh and Hayward set out on 8 May 1916 from Hut Point (A), intending to walk to Cape Evans (B). They disappeared in the area marked C.

With the help of fresh seal meat which halted the ravages of scurvy, the survivors slowly recovered at Hut Point. The unstable condition of the sea ice in McMurdo Sound prevented them from completing the journey to the Cape Evans base. Conditions at Hut Point were gloomy and depressing, with an unrelieved diet and no normal comforts; Mackintosh in particular found the squalor of the hut intolerable, and dreaded the possibility that, caught at Hut Point, they might miss the return of the ship. On 8 May 1916, after carrying out reconnaissance on the state of the sea ice, Mackintosh announced that he and Hayward were prepared to risk the walk to Cape Evans. Although Richards, Joyce and Wild were not in favour, Mackintosh was still in charge of the party and had final say. Richards later revealed in an interview that Hayward might not have been as keen as Mackintosh. Richards thought Hayward looked dubious but possibly he did not wish to 'lose face'.

Against the urgent advice of their comrades, the two men set off, carrying only light supplies. Shortly after they had moved out of sight of Hut Point, a severe blizzard developed which lasted for two days. When it had subsided, Joyce and Richards followed the still visible footmarks on the ice up to a large crack, where the tracks stopped. Neither Mackintosh nor Hayward arrived at Cape Evans and no trace of either was ever found, despite extensive searches carried out by Joyce after he, Richards and Wild finally managed to reach Cape Evans in June. After Aurora finally returned to Cape Evans in January 1917, there were further searches, equally fruitless. All the indications were that Mackintosh and Hayward had either fallen through the ice, or that the ice on which they had been walking had been blown out to sea during the blizzard.

Mackintosh is commemorated by a memorial on his mother Annie's grave in the churchyard of St John the Evangelist's Church in Burgess Hill, West Sussex. Two of his brothers who died in Thailand and Southern Rhodesia respectively are also commemorated there.

== Legacy and assessment ==
Mackintosh's own expedition diaries, which cover the period up to 30 September 1915, have not been published; they are held by the Scott Polar Research Institute. The two main accounts available to general readers are Joyce's diaries, published in 1929 as The South Polar Trail, and the account of Dick Richards: The Ross Sea Shore Party 1914–17. Mackintosh's reputation is not well-served by either, particularly Joyce's partisan record which is described by one commentator as a "self-aggrandizing epic". Joyce is generally scathing about Mackintosh's leadership; Richards's account is much shorter and more straightforward, although decades later, when he was the only member of the expedition still alive (he died in 1985, aged 91), he spoke out, claiming that Mackintosh on the depot-laying march was "tremendously pathetic", had "lost his nerve completely", and that the fatal ice walk was "suicide". The circumstances of Mackintosh's death have led commentators to emphasise his impetuousness and incompetence. This generally negative view of him was not, however, unanimous among his comrades. Stevens, the party's scientist, found Mackintosh "steadfast and reliable", and believed that the Ross Sea party would have achieved much less but for Mackintosh's unwearying drive. John King Davis, too, admired Mackintosh's dedication and called the depot-laying journey a "magnificent achievement".

Shackleton was equivocal. In South he acknowledges that Mackintosh and his men achieved their object, praises the party's qualities of endurance and self-sacrifice, and asserts that Mackintosh died for his country. On the other hand, in a letter home, he is highly critical: "Mackintosh seemed to have no idea of discipline or organisation ...". Shackleton did, however, donate part of the proceeds from a short New Zealand lecture tour to assist the Mackintosh family. His son, Lord Shackleton, in a much later assessment of the expedition, wrote: "Three men in particular emerge as heroes: Captain Aeneas Mackintosh, ... Dick Richards, and Ernest Joyce." Mackintosh had two daughters, the second born while he was in Australia awaiting the Aurora's departure. On the return Barrier journey in February 1916, expecting to die, he wrote a farewell message, with echoes of Captain Scott. The message concludes: "If it is God's will that we should have given up our lives then we do so in the British manner as our tradition holds us in honour bound to do. Goodbye, friends. I feel sure that my dear wife and children will not be neglected." In 1923, Gladys Mackintosh married Joseph Stenhouse, Aurora's first officer and later captain. Mackintosh, who had received a silver Polar Medal for his work during the Nimrod expedition, is commemorated by Mt Mackintosh.
