= Cape Evans =

Headland in Antarctica

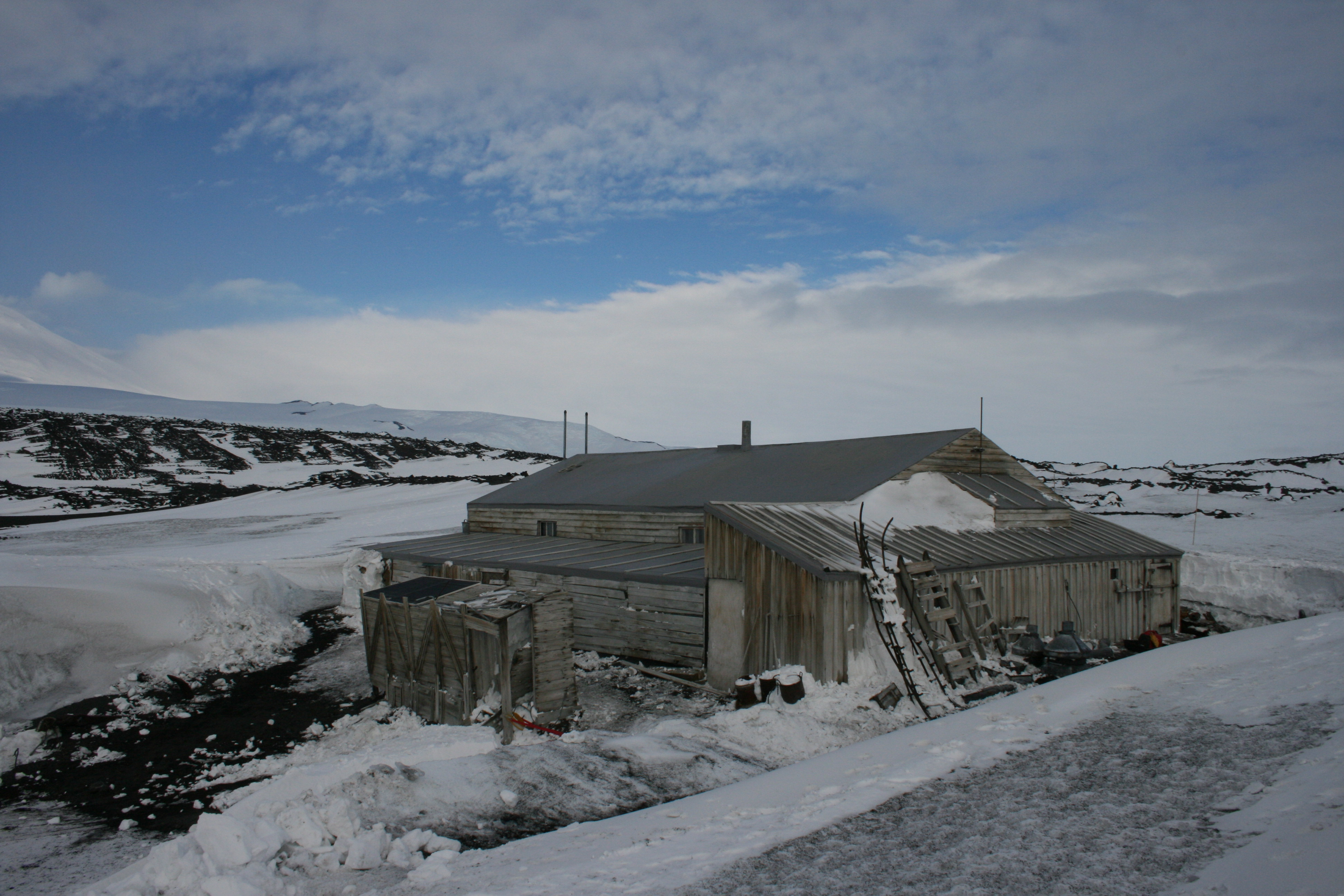
- Scott's Hut at Cape Evans

- Location within Antarctica

Geography
- Location: Antarctica
- Coordinates: 77°38′S 166°24′E

Administration
- Antarctica
- Administered under the Antarctic Treaty System

Cape Evans (77°38′S 166°24′E) is a rocky cape on the west side of Ross Island, Antarctica, forming the north side of the entrance to Erebus Bay.

== History ==
The cape was discovered by the British National Antarctic Expedition, 1901–04, under Robert Falcon Scott, who named it the "Skuary" after the birds. Scott's second expedition, the British Antarctic Expedition, 1910–13, built its headquarters here, renaming the cape for Lieutenant Edward Evans, Royal Navy, second in command of the expedition. Scott's headquarters building still exists and is known as Scott's Hut.

== Historic sites and monuments ==
Scott's Hut has been designated a Historic Site or Monument (HSM 16), following a proposal by New Zealand and the United Kingdom to the Antarctic Treaty Consultative Meeting.

A cross on Windvane Hill, Cape Evans, was erected by the Ross Sea Party, led by Captain Aeneas Mackintosh, of Sir Ernest Shackleton's Imperial Trans-Antarctic Expedition of 1914–1917, in memory of three members of the party who died in the vicinity in 1916: Arnold Spencer-Smith, Aeneas Mackintosh and Victor Hayward. The cross has been designated a Historic Site or Monument (HSM 17), following a proposal by New Zealand and the United Kingdom to the Antarctic Treaty Consultative Meeting.

The whole site is protected as Antarctic Specially Protected Area (ASPA) No.155 largely because of its historic significance as one of the principal sites of early human activity in Antarctica.

== Lakes ==
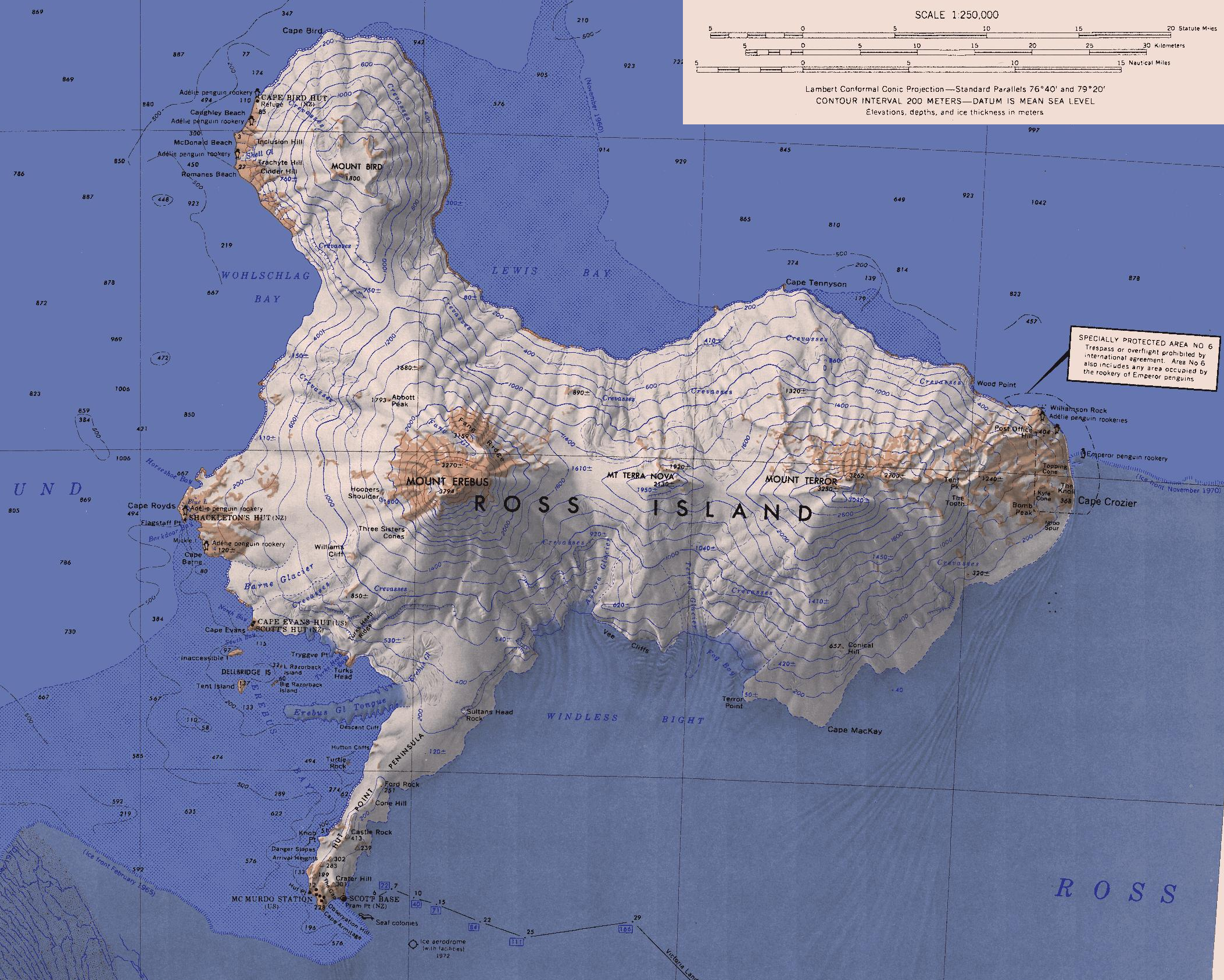
Cape Evans in southwest

=== Skua Lake ===
77°38′S 166°25′E. A small lake close northwest of Island Lake at Cape Evans. Named by the British Antarctic Expedition (1910–13) because of the nearby skua rookery.

=== Algal Lake ===
77°38′S 166°25′E. A small, roughly circular meltwater lake about midway between Skua Lake and Island Lake. Named by USARP biologists David T. Mason, Charles R. Goldman and Brian J.B. Wood, Jr., who studied the lake in the 1961–62 and 1962-63 seasons. The name derives from the striking mat of blue-green algal remains around the leeward edge of the lake.

=== Island Lake ===
77°38′S 166°26′E. A lake lying southeast of Skua Lake at Cape Evans. It appears that the descriptive name was given by members of the British Antarctic Expedition (1910–13), who built their winter quarters hut at Cape Evans.

== Other features ==
Features around Cape Evans include North Bay, South Bay, Cape Evans Hut, Tryggve Point, Turks Head Bay, Turks Head, Inaccessible Island, Tent Island, Dellbridge Island, Little Razorback Island and Big Razorback Island.

=== North Bay ===
77°38′S 166°23′E. A small bay on the north side of Cape Evans. Named by members of the British Antarctic Expedition, 1910-13.

=== Windvane Hill ===
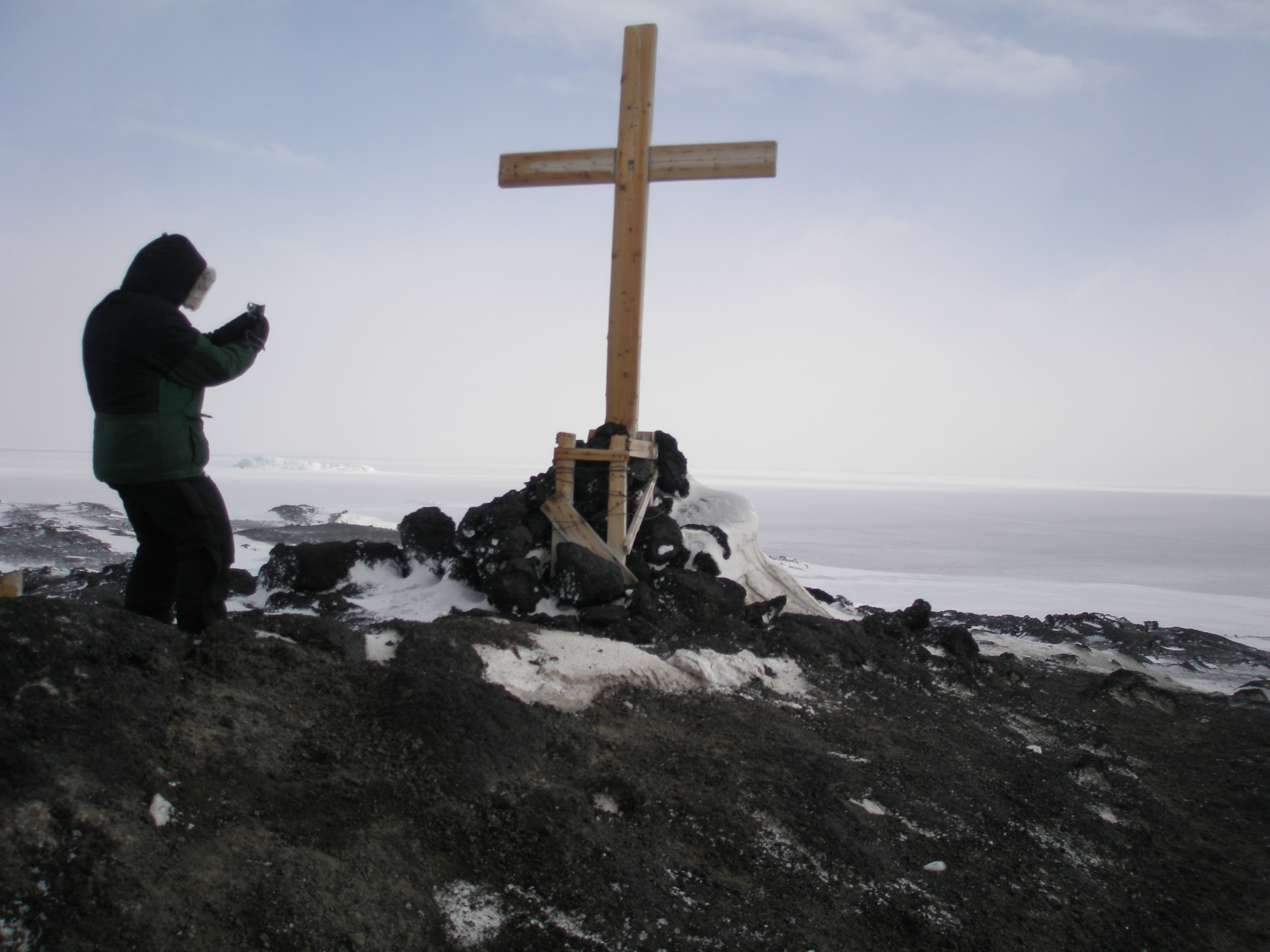
Memorial cross at Cape Evans

77°38′S 166°24′E. Small hill just northeast of the extremity of Cape Evans. So named by the British Antarctic Expedition (1910–13) because an anemometer station was established on this site.

=== South Bay ===
77°38′S 166°25′E. A small bay on the south side of Cape Evans. Named by members of the British Antarctic Expedition, 1910-13.

=== The Ramp ===
77.63202°S 166.429595°E. A steep rocky slope 0.5 nautical miles (0.93 km; 0.58 mi) inland from Cape Evans. The slope is 0.5 nautical miles (0.93 km; 0.58 mi) long and rises to 50 metres (160 ft). Descriptively named by the British Antarctic Expedition (BrAE), 1910-13.

=== Pakaru Icefalls ===
77.630333°S 166.741909°E. Icefalls between Cape Evans and Turks Head on the southwest shore of Ross Island. The feature comprises a very irregular and broken glacial area to the north of Turks Head Ridge with ice descending to Erebus Bay. Descriptively named, Pakaru being a Maori word meaning "broken."

=== Tryggve Point ===
77°39′S 166°42′E. A point 1 nautical mile (1.9 km; 1.2 mi) northwest of Turks Head. First charted by the British Antarctic Expedition, 1910–13, under Scott, who named it for Tryggve Gran, Norwegian ski expert with the expedition.

=== Turks Head ===
77°40′S 166°46′E. A precipitous black headland over 200 metres (660 ft) high, 5 nautical miles (9.3 km; 5.8 mi) east-southeast of Cape Evans. Discovered by the British National Antarctic Expedition (1901–04) and so named because of its resemblance to a head swathed in a turban.

== Sources ==
- Alberts, Fred G., ed. (1995), Geographic Names of the Antarctic (PDF) (2 ed.), United States Board on Geographic Names This article incorporates public domain material from websites or documents of the United States Board on Geographic Names.
- Langner, Rainer (2007), Scott and Amundsen: Duel in the Ice, translated by Beech, Timothy, London: Haus Publishing, ISBN 1-905791-08-9
- "Pakaru Icefalls", Geographic Names Information System, United States Geological Survey, United States Department of the Interior
- Ross Island, USGS: United States Geological Survey
- "The Ramp", Geographic Names Information System, United States Geological Survey, United States Department of the Interior

This article incorporates public domain material from websites or documents of the United States Geological Survey.
