= Manhauling =

Moving load-carrying vehicles by human power

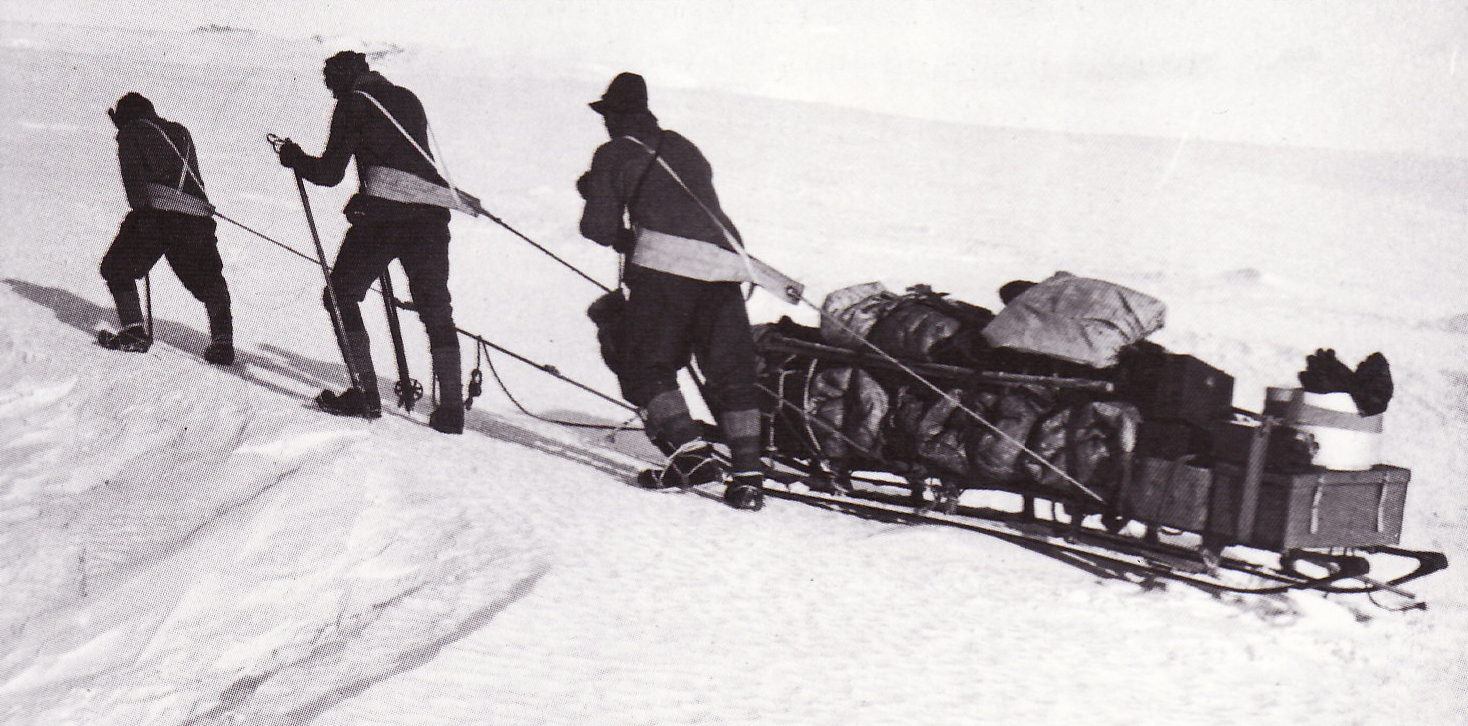
Men of the Terra Nova Expedition hauling sleds full of supplies.

Manhauling or man-hauling is the pulling forward of sledges, trucks or other load-carrying vehicles by human power unaided by animals (e.g. huskies) or machines. The term is used primarily in connection with travel over snow and ice, and was common during Arctic and Antarctic expeditions before the days of modern motorised traction.

In the years following the end of the Napoleonic Wars the British Royal Navy took up polar/cold climate exploration as its chief peacetime activity. Due to its simplicity, manhauling was adopted by the early British naval expeditions, where it quickly became the preferred or even the 'traditional' technique. In time it would be hailed as inherently more noble than the sole use of dogs as practised by the native Arctic-dwelling peoples. The technique's chief advocate was Sir Clements Markham, President of the Royal Geographical Society during the latter part of the 19th century. A figure of considerable influence, he brought his prejudices to bear on the series of great British Antarctic ventures during the Heroic Age of Antarctic Exploration, in all of which manhauling was predominant.

Many later writers would condemn manhauling, particularly with heavily loaded sledges, as inefficient and wasteful, citing it as a direct cause of the great Antarctic tragedy of 1910–12 – the deaths of Captain Scott and his four companions as they man-hauled their way across the Ross Ice Shelf on their return from the South Pole, while their rival Amundsen had beaten them to the Pole using dogs, and returned safely.

== Historical perspective ==
=== Naval tradition ===
Long before the nations of Europe and America became fascinated with polar exploration, the native populations of Northern Canada, Greenland, Lapland and Siberia had trained dogs to draw sledges. Attempts by the early polar explorers to adopt these techniques were rarely successful – the handling of “Eskimo” dogs was recognised as a specialized art. This led to the use of manhauling as a simpler alternative, when the Royal Navy began its long association with polar exploration. The first example of manhauling on a naval Arctic expedition was the journey by William Edward Parry across Melville Island in 1820, when he and his party dragged 800 pounds (360 kg) of equipment on a two-wheeled cart. Thereafter man-hauling began to be seen as a natural, even a 'nobler' alternative to the use of dogs. Francis Leopold McClintock earned the title of "Father of Arctic Sledging" for his feats of manhauling travel during one of the many expeditions despatched to search for the missing Franklin expedition. Among McClintock's admirers on that expedition was a 21-year-old midshipman, Clements Markham.

=== Markham’s obsession ===
Based on his experiences with McClintock and his love for naval traditions, Markham, future President of the Royal Geographical Society, became a fervent believer in the principle that manhauling was the purest form of polar travel. Markham became the driving force behind British Antarctic exploration endeavours in the early 20th century, and was the mentor of Robert Falcon Scott, to whom his thinking and drive were transferred. After his unhappy experiences with dogs in the Antarctic on the Discovery Expedition, 1901–04 Scott wrote, in his account of the expedition: "In my mind no journey ever made with dogs can approach the height of that fine conception which is realised when a party of men go forth to face hardships, dangers, and difficulties with their own unaided efforts […] Surely in this case the conquest is more nobly and splendidly won."

=== Scott and Shackleton ===
An aversion to the use of dogs pervaded all the British expeditions during the Heroic Age of Antarctic Exploration (including those led by Ernest Shackleton). This was baffling to the great Norwegian explorers Fridtjof Nansen and Roald Amundsen. To them manhauling was "futile toil", to be avoided at all costs. Edward Wilson, however, on the fatal southern journey during Scott's 1910–1913 Terra Nova Expedition expressed a profound relief, as the pole-bound party began its ascent of the Beardmore Glacier after the last of the ponies had been shot: "Thank God the horses are now done with, and we begin the heavier work ourselves", he wrote. His companion Lawrence Oates thought differently but kept his counsel. Later, when the Pole had been attained and Amundsen's prior arrival discovered, Oates privately castigated “our wretched manhauling” as a cause of his party's defeat.

=== Some conclusions ===
Some chroniclers have suggested that excessive reliance on manhauling may have cost the lives of Scott's polar party. Each man pulling a sledge was burning around 6,000 calories a day, and consuming rations producing only 4,500 calories. Max Jones concludes that they were slowly starving to death. Much earlier, an expedition account by James Gordon Hayes had highlighted two principal causes of Scott's disaster: dietary deficiencies and the decision to rely on men instead of dogs. In 1997, in another history of the expedition, Michael de-la-Noy concludes: “…the whole expedition had been founded upon a blind and very British belief in the moral superiority of human muscle power…Scott thought it more manly for men to haul the sledges themselves. Five of them died as a result”.

== Sources ==
- Berton, Pierre: The Arctic Grail: The Quest for the Northwest Passage and the North Pole, 1818-1909 Viking Penguin Inc. New York, 1988 ISBN 0670824917
- Huntford, Roland: The Last Place On Earth Pan Books Ltd London, 1985 ISBN 0330288164
- Jones, Max: The Last Great Quest OUP Oxford, 2003 ISBN 0192804839
- Preston, Diana: A First Rate Tragedy Constable Co Ltd London, 1997 ISBN 0094795304
- Scott, Robert F.: The Voyage of the Discovery Smith, Elder & Co London, 1905
