= Kelly Tyler-Lewis =

American screenwriter

Kelly Tyler-Lewis is a filmmaker and author. Kelly is best known for winning a 2002 Emmy for her historical documentary film, Shackleton’s Voyage of Endurance, which won as 'Best Historical Documentary'; the film had also been nominated for 'Best Documentary’. She also wrote and published the 2006 book The Lost Men: The Harrowing Story of Shackleton's Ross Sea Party. She began her career at WGBH’s NOVA.

She holds an A.L.B. from Harvard University.
