= Arnold Spencer-Smith =

English clergyman, explorer, photographer

Arnold Spencer-Smith FRHistS
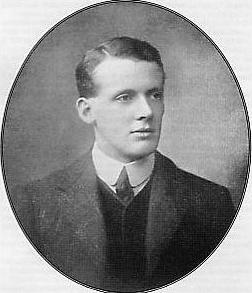
- Spencer-Smith in 1907
- Born: Arnold Patrick Spencer-Smith; 17 March 1883; Streatham, Surrey, England
- Died: 9 March 1916 (aged 32); Ross Ice Shelf, Antarctica
- Education: Westminster City School
- Alma mater: King's College, London; Queens' College, Cambridge
- Occupation(s): Clergyman, photographer
- Known for: Ross Sea party member
- Awards: Polar Medal (silver)

Arnold Patrick Spencer-Smith FRHistS (17 March 1883 – 9 March 1916) was an English clergyman and amateur photographer who joined Sir Ernest Shackleton's 1914–1917 Imperial Trans-Antarctic Expedition as chaplain on the Ross Sea party, who were tasked with laying a chain of depots across the Ross Ice Shelf towards the Beardmore Glacier for Shackleton's intended crossing party.

On the trail, Spencer-Smith fell ill with scurvy at 83° south and left alone in a tent for 10 days while the others continued on to lay the last depot. After their return he was pulled on a sledge back towards the base at Cape Evans, but died on the journey in March 1916.

Cape Spencer-Smith on White Island in the Ross Archipelago is named in his honour.

== Early life and education ==
Spencer-Smith was born on 17 March 1883, in Streatham, Surrey, England. He shared a birthday with Lawrence Oates, who died on his return from the South Pole with Robert Falcon Scott on the Terra Nova Expedition. His sister, Joan Spencer-Smith (1891–1965), was a notable New Zealand Anglican deaconess and lecturer.

He was educated at Westminster City School, King's College London and Queens' College, Cambridge (1903–1906). He did not attend his exams and was given a pass degree BA in history. He was a Fellow of the Royal Historical Society.

== Career ==
After a few years of teaching at Merchiston Castle School, Edinburgh, Spencer-Smith was ordained as deacon into the Scottish Episcopal Church in 1910 by the Most Rev Walter Robberds at St Mary's Cathedral, Edinburgh. He served as curate of Christ Church, Morningside (1910–1912), and All Saints, Edinburgh (1913–1914).

He was ordained as priest by the Bishop of Edinburgh, the Rt Rev Somerset Walpole, at All Saints' Church Edinburgh shortly before leaving to join the SY Aurora on its voyage to the Great Ice Barrier.

== Ross Sea party ==
Spencer-Smith's interest in travelling to Antarctica may have been kindled as a student at Woodbridge Grammar School in Suffolk. A 1899 school lecture given by a W. W. Mumford on "Arctic Travel & Adventure" touched on the travels of explorers in the Arctic regions, some who perished in their attempts to reach the North Pole and others who died searching for the North-West passage. Spencer-Smith wrote a report of the lecture for his school magazine. However, it is unclear how he came to join Shackleton's expedition. One version is that he had wanted to enlist in the army at the outbreak of war, but as a clergyman was barred from combatant service. He therefore volunteered himself to Shackleton as a replacement for one of the original party who had left for active service. After arrival in Antarctica his unfamiliarity with polar work and limited physical stamina were in evidence during the first depot-laying journey of January–March 1915, before he was sent back to base by expedition leader Aeneas Mackintosh. During the 1915 winter season he worked at the Cape Evans base, mainly in the darkroom where he sometimes held religious services.

The circumstances of the expedition, after the depletion of the shore party following the loss of SY Aurora in May 1915, meant that Spencer-Smith was required for the main depot journey to the Beardmore Glacier during the 1915–1916 summer season, irrespective of his physical limitations. In this he showed no reluctance and worked tirelessly. However, worn down by the preliminary work of hauling stores up to the base depot at Minna Bluff during the four-month period September–December 1915, and the effects of scurvy, he was unable to sustain the physical effort required on the main depot-laying journey south, and collapsed before the Beardmore was reached. Thereafter he had to be carried on the sledge, unable to help himself and dependent on Ernest Wild for his most basic needs. The party nevertheless completed its depot-laying mission and struggled back northward in worsening weather conditions, each man growing weaker as scurvy took hold, and progress forward was with acute difficulty. Spencer-Smith, uncomplaining but in the latter stages occasionally delirious, died on the Barrier on 9 March 1916, aged 32, two days before the safety of Hut Point was finally reached. He was buried in the ice.

Spencer-Smith's condition, along with his expedition leader Aeneas Mackintosh, weakened well before the other man in their three-man hauling party, Ernest Wild. A logical reason why Mackintosh and Spencer-Smith succumbed to scurvy before Wild was their "dislike" of seal meat. At one time some freshly cooked seal meat was brought out for these three men when they were on the Barrier but Wild was the only man to take full advantage of this opportunity to eat fresh food. Both Mackintosh and Spencer-Smith exhibited their dislike of seal meat at this time, as they had before during the previous winter when at the Cape Evans hut. However, Spencer-Smith's health was poor. On 16 February 1915, in his early days of sledging he noted: "I am a little strained on the left side intercostals, I hope, no heart, and shall have to be careful." In August 1915, before the second season of sledging started, Spencer-Smith was seen to be "perfectly sound in body and limb" but did have "an intermittent heart". He was told he could go sledging but if he felt any effects of his heart he was to turn back at the earliest possible moment.

Spencer-Smith was unmarried. He dedicated a final diary entry, 7 March 1916, to his father, mother, brothers and sisters. He was awarded the Polar Medal in silver posthumously. Spencer-Smith's diaries are held at Canterbury Museum, Christchurch, and the Scott Polar Research Institute, Cambridge.
