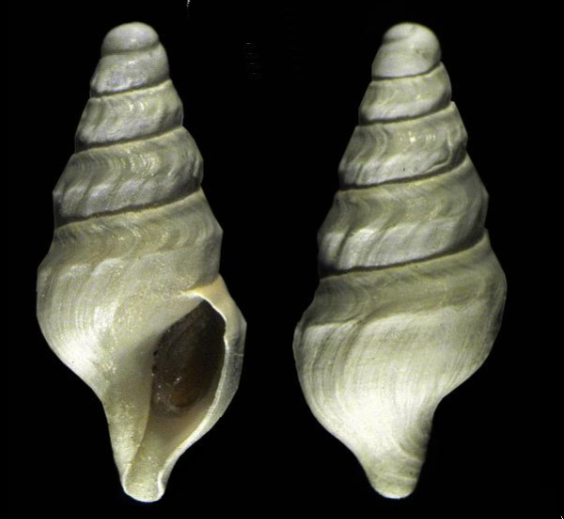
- Shell of Antarctospira badenpowelli (specimen at the Smithsonian Institution)

Scientific classification
- Kingdom: Animalia
- Phylum: Mollusca
- Class: Gastropoda
- Subclass: Caenogastropoda
- Order: Neogastropoda
- Superfamily: Conoidea
- Family: Borsoniidae
- Genus: Antarctospira
- Species: A. badenpowelli

Binomial name
- Antarctospira badenpowelli (Dell, 1990)

Synonyms
- Leucosyrinx badenpowelli Dell, 1990

= Antarctospira badenpowelli =

Species of gastropod

Antarctospira badenpowelli is a species of sea snail, a marine gastropod mollusk in the family Borsoniidae.

== Description ==
The length of the shell varies between 7 mm and 20 mm.

== Distribution ==
This species occurs off the Beauchene Island, Falkland Islands, in the South Atlantic Ocean; in the McMurdo Sound, Ross Sea, Antarctica

== Bibliography ==
- Dell, R. K. (1990). Antarctic Mollusca with special reference to the fauna of the Ross Sea. Bulletin of the Royal Society of New Zealand, Wellington 27: 1–311 page(s): 224, figs 393, 410
