= Melanella exulata =

- Shell of Melanella exulata (original image)

Scientific classification
- Kingdom: Animalia
- Phylum: Mollusca
- Class: Gastropoda
- Subclass: Caenogastropoda
- Order: Littorinimorpha
- Family: Eulimidae
- Genus: Melanella
- Species: M. exulata

Binomial name
- Melanella exulata (E. A. Smith, 1915)

Synonyms
- Eulima exulata E. A. Smith, 1915 (original combination)

Species of gastropod

Melanella exulata, is a species of sea snail, a marine gastropod mollusk in the family Eulimidae. The species is one of a number within the genus Melanella.

== Description ==
The length of the shell attains 9 mm, its diameter 2.75 mm.

(Original description) The shell is subulate, white, glossy, and generally a little curved or eccentric toward the apex. There are nine whorls, which increase slowly and are slightly convex. The suture is a little oblique and narrowly marginated with a hyaline band. The aperture is inversely ear-shaped. The outer lip (when viewed laterally) is prominently curved and obscurely sinuate near the suture. The columella is a little thickened and united to the end of the outer lip by a very thin callus.

== Distribution ==
This marine species was originally found off McMurdo Sound , Antarctica; also off Australian Antarctic Territory (Victoria Land; Ross Sea; off Queen Maud Land).
