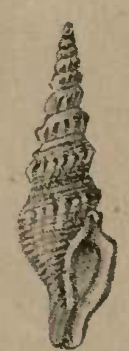
- Typhlomangelia nivalis shell

Scientific classification
- Kingdom: Animalia
- Phylum: Mollusca
- Class: Gastropoda
- Subclass: Caenogastropoda
- Order: Neogastropoda
- Family: Borsoniidae
- Genus: Typhlomangelia; G.O. Sars, 1878

Type species
- Pleurotoma nivalis Lovén, 1846

Synonyms
- Suavodrillia (Typhlomangelia) G. O. Sars, 1878; Vexithara Finlay, 1926; Viridoturris Powell, 1964

= Typhlomangelia =

Genus of sea snails

Typhlomangelia is a genus of sea snails, marine gastropod mollusks in the family Borsoniidae, the cone snails and their allies.

== Species ==
Species within the genus Typhlomangelia include:

- Typhlomangelia adenica Sysoev, 1996
- Typhlomangelia brevicanalis (Shuto, 1983)
- Typhlomangelia cariosa (Watson, 1886)
- Typhlomangelia corona (Laseron, 1954)
- Typhlomangelia fluctuosa (Watson, 1881)
- Typhlomangelia lincta (Watson, 1881)
- † Typhlomangelia magna (Maxwell, 1969)
- Typhlomangelia maldivica Sysoev, 1996
- Typhlomangelia nivalis (Lovén, 1846)
- † Typhlomangelia nodosolirata (Suter, 1917)
- Typhlomangelia polythele Barnard, 1963
- † Typhlomangelia powelli (Maxwell, 1988)
- Typhlomangelia pyrrha (Watson, 1881)
- † Typhlomangelia vexilliformis (P. Marshall & R. Murdoch, 1923)

Species brought into synonymy

- Typhlomangelia innocentia (Dell, 1990): synonym of Typhlomangelia innocentia Dell, 1990
- Typhlomangelia nivale (Loven, 1846): synonym of Typhlomangelia nivalis (Lovén, 1846)
- Typhlomangelia principalis Thiele, 1912: synonym of Antarctospira principalis (Thiele, 1912)
- Typhlomangelia tanneri Verrill & S. Smith, 1884: synonym of Retidrillia pruina (Watson, 1881)
