= Archibald McMurdo =

Scottish naval officer and polar explorer

Vice-Admiral Archibald McMurdo
- Born: 24 September 1812; Scotland
- Died: 11 December 1875 (aged 63); Scotland
- Military career
- Allegiance: United Kingdom
- Branch: Royal Navy
- Service years: 1824–1867
- Rank: Vice-Admiral
- Commands: HMS Contest
- Conflicts: Greek War of Independence; Morea expedition
- Other work: Antarctic exploration

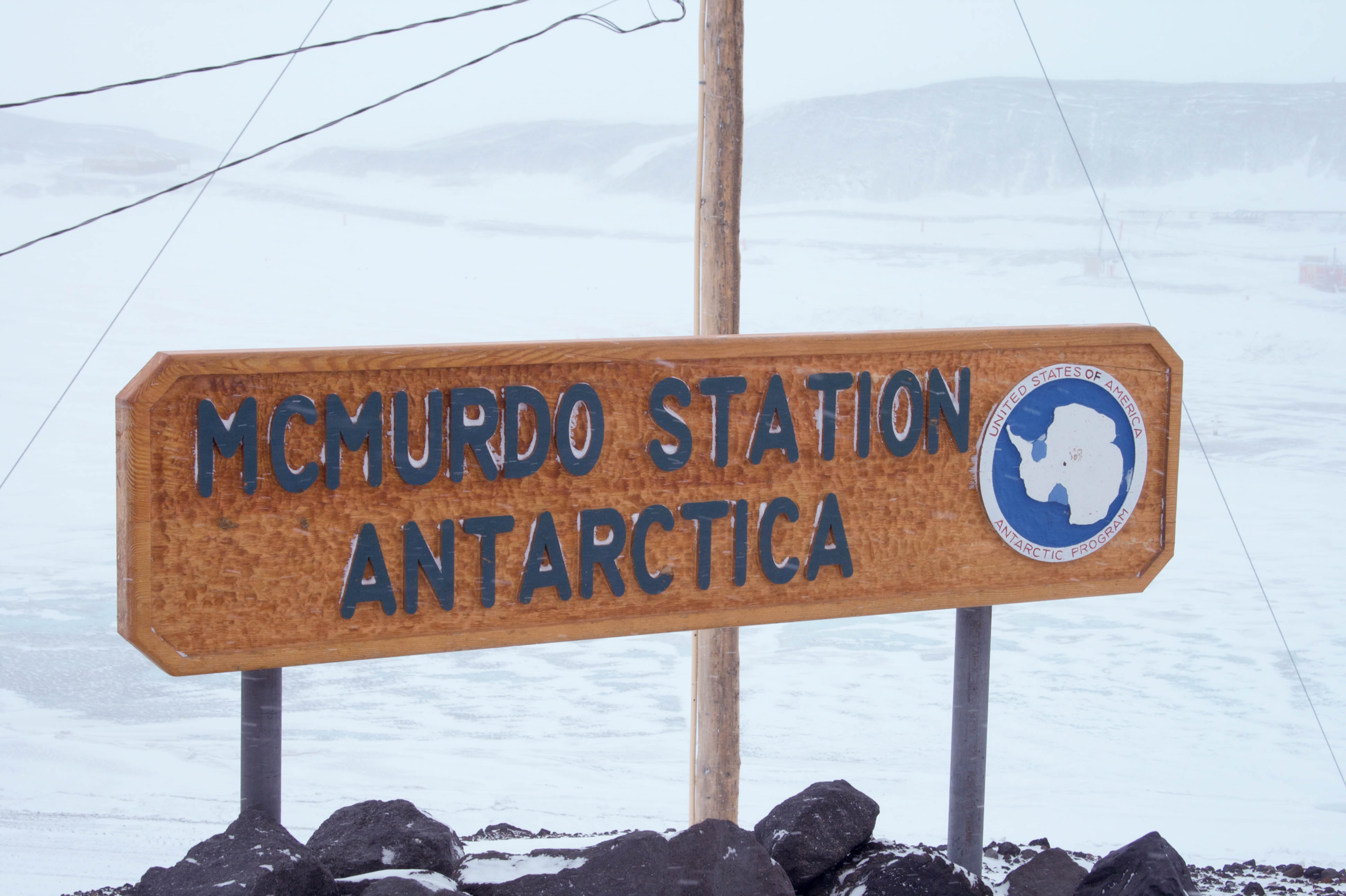
The McMurdo Station Antarctica Sign overlooking the Ross Sea

Vice-Admiral Archibald William McMurdo (24 September 1812 – 11 December 1875) was a Scottish naval officer and polar explorer after whom Antarctica's McMurdo Sound, McMurdo Station, McMurdo Ice Shelf, McMurdo Dry Valleys and McMurdo–South Pole Highway are named.

== Early life ==
Archibald William McMurdo was born on 24 September 1812 in Scotland. He was the son of Lieutenant Colonel Archibald McMurdo and grandson of John McMurdo, a chamberlain at Drumlanrig Castle.

== Career ==
McMurdo joined the Royal Navy on 6 October 1824, at the age of 12. He was promoted to lieutenant in 1836 for his skill and courage in saving the crew of a shipwrecked whaler from hostile New Zealand natives. He achieved the rank of commander in 1843 and captain in 1851.

His career included two discovery expeditions aboard HMS Terror, the first to Hudson Bay (1836–1837), the second to Antarctica (1839–1842). In 1836 he served on HMS Volage during its voyage to East India. During the Antarctica voyage, McMurdo Sound was discovered in February 1841, and named after McMurdo by Captain James Clark Ross. Ross also wrote a letter to the Admiralty recommending McMurdo for promotion.

In 1845, McMurdo expressed doubt that Captain John Franklin would return from his ill-fated Northwest Passage expedition that resulted in the loss of all 129 crewmen in mysterious circumstances (it is now known that his ships were inextricably trapped in ice). McMurdo achieved command of HMS Contest in 1846, which was detailed to the coast of West Africa. He retired as a rear-admiral, and was promoted in retirement to vice-admiral in 1873.

== Death ==
McMurdo died on 11 December 1875 in Scotland. His estate was probated in Dumfries on 3 February 1876.

== See also ==
- O'Byrne, William Richard (1849). "McMurdo, Archibald" . A Naval Biographical Dictionary . John Murray – via Wikisource.
