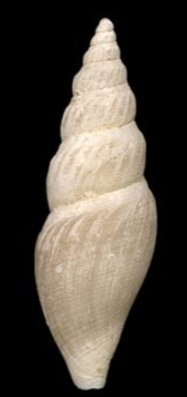
- Shell of Antarctospira angusteplicata

Scientific classification
- Kingdom: Animalia
- Phylum: Mollusca
- Class: Gastropoda
- Subclass: Caenogastropoda
- Order: Neogastropoda
- Superfamily: Conoidea
- Family: Borsoniidae
- Genus: Antarctospira; Kantor, Harasewych & Puillandre, 2016

Type species
- Leucosyrinx badenpowelli Dell, 1990

= Antarctospira =

Genus of gastropods

Antarctospira is a genus of sea snails, marine gastropod mollusks in the family Borsoniidae.

== Taxonomy ==
The antarctic-subantarctic genus Antarctospira shares the axial sculpture pattern as well as the shape and position of the anal sinus with Leucosyrinx. Notably, four out of the five species attributed to Antarctospira were initially classified as Leucosyrinx

The examination of the radula revealed that Antarctospira possesses a radula with hypodermic marginal teeth thus suggesting its placement within the family Borsoniidae Bellardi, 1875. Furthermore, all species of Antarctospira have a much shorter and broader siphonal canal, which is barely separable from high and broad aperture. Its paucispiral protoconch is larger, attaining 2.5 mm in diameter (versus 1 mm in Leucosyrinx).

== Species ==
Species within the genus Antarctospira include:

- Antarctospira angusteplicata (Strebel, 1905)
- Antarctospira badenpowelli (Dell, 1990)
- Antarctospira falklandica (Powell, 1951)
- Antarctospira mawsoni (Powell, 1958)
- Antarctospira principalis (Thiele, 1912)

Species brought into synonymy

- Antarctospira paragenota (Powell, 1951): synonym of Antarctospira angusteplicata (Strebel, 1905)
