= Typhlomangelia lincta =

Scientific classification
- Kingdom: Animalia
- Phylum: Mollusca
- Class: Gastropoda
- Subclass: Caenogastropoda
- Order: Neogastropoda
- Superfamily: Conoidea
- Family: Borsoniidae
- Genus: Typhlomangelia
- Species: T. lincta

Binomial name
- Typhlomangelia lincta (Watson, 1881)

Synonyms
- Pleurotoma lincta Watson, 1881

Species of gastropod

Typhlomangelia lincta is a species of sea snail, a marine gastropod mollusk in the family Borsoniidae.

== Description ==
The length of the shell attains 12 mm.

== Distribution ==
This marine species occurs off Puerto Rico and the Virgin Islands.
