= Typhlomangelia magna =

Scientific classification
- Kingdom: Animalia
- Phylum: Mollusca
- Class: Gastropoda
- Subclass: Caenogastropoda
- Order: Neogastropoda
- Superfamily: Conoidea
- Family: Borsoniidae
- Genus: Typhlomangelia
- Species: T. magna

Binomial name
- Typhlomangelia magna (Maxwell, 1969)

Extinct species of gastropod

Typhlomangelia magna is an extinct species of sea snail, a marine gastropod mollusc in the family Borsoniidae.

== Distribution ==
This extinct marine species is endemic to New Zealand.
