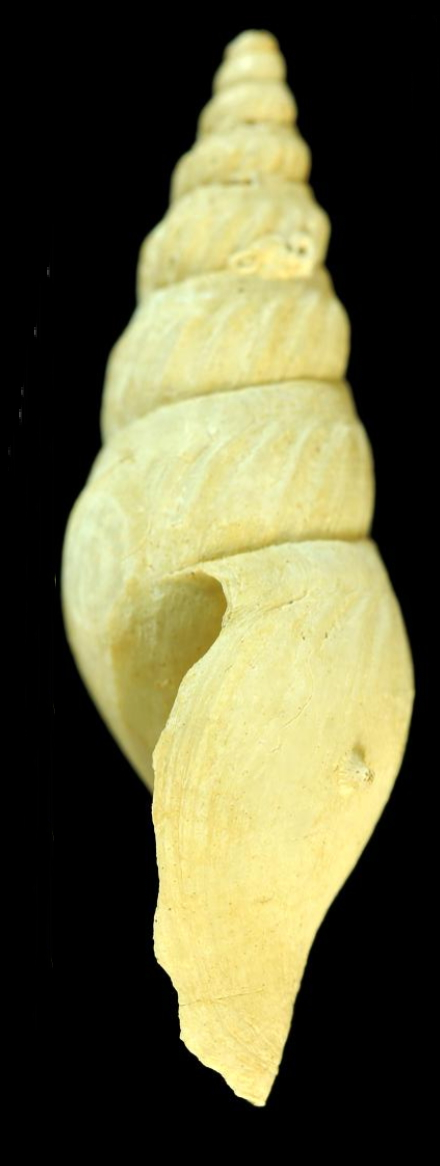
- Shell of Antarctospira falklandica (specimen at the Smithsonian Institution)

Scientific classification
- Kingdom: Animalia
- Phylum: Mollusca
- Class: Gastropoda
- Subclass: Caenogastropoda
- Order: Neogastropoda
- Superfamily: Conoidea
- Family: Borsoniidae
- Genus: Antarctospira
- Species: A. falklandica

Binomial name
- Antarctospira falklandica (Powell, 1951)

Synonyms
- Leucosyrinx falklandica Powell, 1951 (original combination)

= Antarctospira falklandica =

Species of gastropod

Antarctospira falklandica is a species of sea snail, a marine gastropod mollusk in the family Borsoniidae.

== Description ==
The shell has six whorls, one of which is a blunt protoconch and a half-whorl of axials. The shell has a consistent color of white, and is covered by a pale surface. The average length of the shell is 15.75 mm, and its diameter reaches up to 5.8 mm.

== Distribution ==
This marine species occurs off the Falkland Islands and Strait Of Magellan, and east of Mouth, Tierra del Fuego, Argentina, South Atlantic Ocean.
