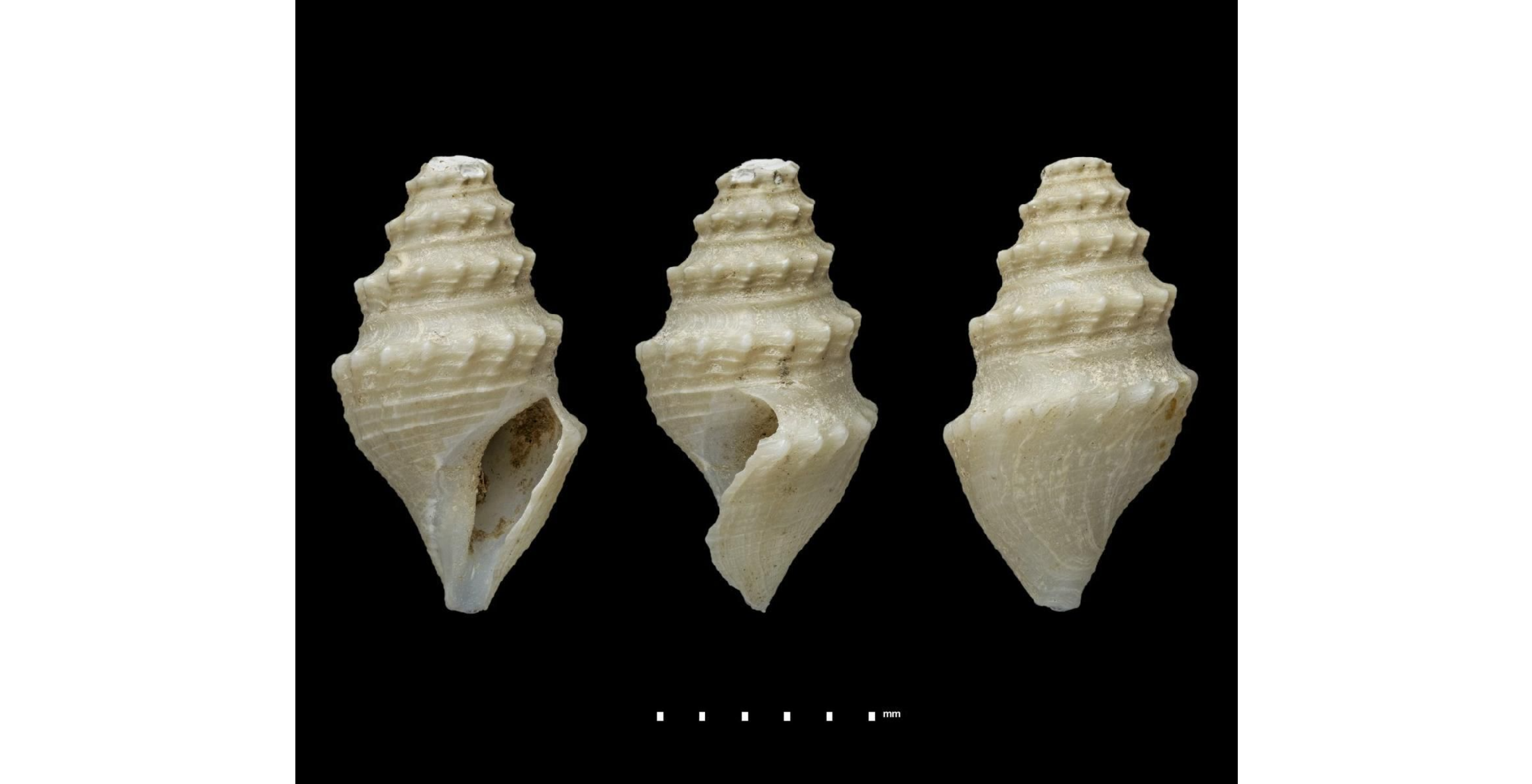
- Typhlomangelia adenica Sysoev, 1996

Scientific classification
- Kingdom: Animalia
- Phylum: Mollusca
- Class: Gastropoda
- Subclass: Caenogastropoda
- Order: Neogastropoda
- Superfamily: Conoidea
- Family: Borsoniidae
- Genus: Typhlomangelia
- Species: T. adenica

Binomial name
- Typhlomangelia adenica Sysoev, 1996

= Typhlomangelia adenica =

Species of gastropod

Typhlomangelia adenica is a species of sea snail, a marine gastropod mollusk in the family Borsoniidae.

== Description ==
The height of the shell attains 10.2 mm, its width 5.6 mm.

== Distribution ==
This marine species occurs in the Gulf of Aden at a depth between 2000 m and 2300 m.
