= Typhlomangelia nodosolirata =

Scientific classification
- Kingdom: Animalia
- Phylum: Mollusca
- Class: Gastropoda
- Subclass: Caenogastropoda
- Order: Neogastropoda
- Superfamily: Conoidea
- Family: Borsoniidae
- Genus: Typhlomangelia
- Species: T. nodosolirata

Binomial name
- Typhlomangelia nodosolirata (Suter, 1917)

Species of sea snail

Typhlomangelia nodosolirata is an extinct species of sea snail, a marine gastropod mollusc in the family Borsoniidae.

== Distribution ==
This extinct marine species was endemic to New Zealand.
