= Typhlomangelia corona =

Scientific classification
- Kingdom: Animalia
- Phylum: Mollusca
- Class: Gastropoda
- Subclass: Caenogastropoda
- Order: Neogastropoda
- Superfamily: Conoidea
- Family: Borsoniidae
- Genus: Typhlomangelia
- Species: T. corona

Binomial name
- Typhlomangelia corona (Laseron, 1954)

Synonyms
- Viridoturris corona (Laseron, 1954); Xenuroturris corona Laseron, 1954

Species of gastropod

Typhlomangelia corona is a species of sea snail, a marine gastropod mollusk in the family Borsoniidae.
