= Antarctospira mawsoni =

Scientific classification
- Kingdom: Animalia
- Phylum: Mollusca
- Class: Gastropoda
- Subclass: Caenogastropoda
- Order: Neogastropoda
- Superfamily: Conoidea
- Family: Borsoniidae
- Genus: Antarctospira
- Species: A. mawsoni

Binomial name
- Antarctospira mawsoni (Powell, 1958)

Species of gastropod

Antarctospira mawsoni is a species of sea snail, a marine gastropod mollusk in the family Borsoniidae.
