= Typhlomangelia maldivica =

Scientific classification
- Kingdom: Animalia
- Phylum: Mollusca
- Class: Gastropoda
- Subclass: Caenogastropoda
- Order: Neogastropoda
- Superfamily: Conoidea
- Family: Borsoniidae
- Genus: Typhlomangelia
- Species: T. maldivica

Binomial name
- Typhlomangelia maldivica Sysoev, 1996

Species of gastropod

Typhlomangelia maldivica is a species of sea snail, a marine gastropod mollusk in the family Borsoniidae.

== Description ==
The height of the shell attains 32 mm, its width 9.1 mm.

== Distribution ==
This marine species occurs off the Maldives at a depth of 800 m.
