= Typhlomangelia vexilliformis =

Scientific classification
- Kingdom: Animalia
- Phylum: Mollusca
- Class: Gastropoda
- Subclass: Caenogastropoda
- Order: Neogastropoda
- Superfamily: Conoidea
- Family: Borsoniidae
- Genus: Typhlomangelia
- Species: T. vexilliformis

Binomial name
- Typhlomangelia vexilliformis (P. Marshall & R. Murdoch, 1923)

Extinct species of gastropod

Typhlomangelia vexilliformis is an extinct species of sea snail, a marine gastropod mollusk in the family Borsoniidae.

== Distribution ==
This extinct marine species is endemic to New Zealand.
