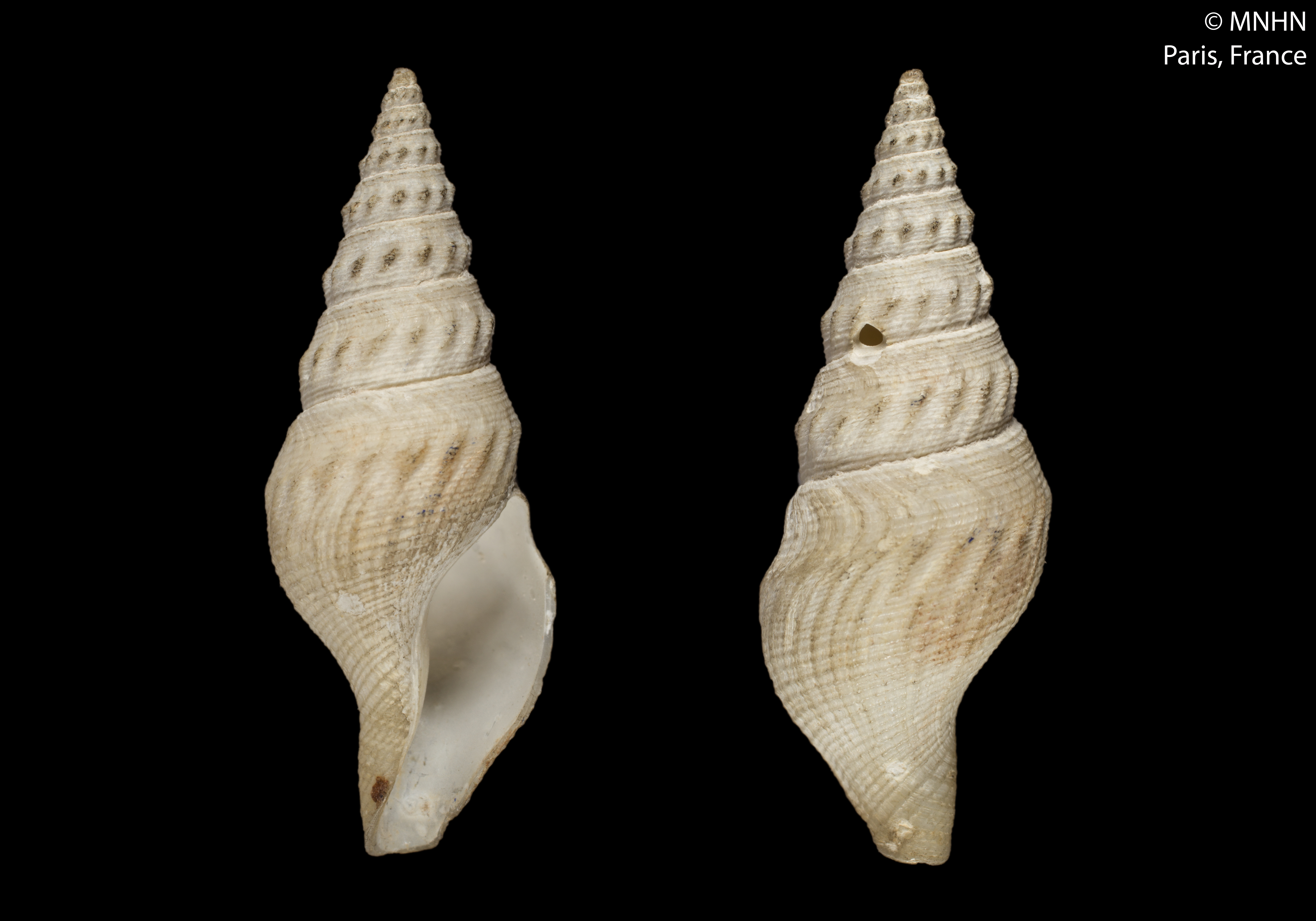
- Shell of Typhlomangelia nivalis (syntype at MNHN, Paris)

Scientific classification
- Kingdom: Animalia
- Phylum: Mollusca
- Class: Gastropoda
- Subclass: Caenogastropoda
- Order: Neogastropoda
- Superfamily: Conoidea
- Family: Borsoniidae
- Genus: Typhlomangelia
- Species: T. nivalis

Binomial name
- Typhlomangelia nivalis (Lovén, 1846)

Synonyms
- Pleurotoma compospira Dautzenberg, Ph. & P. Fischer, 1896; Pleurotoma neotericum Locard, E.A.A., 1897; Pleurotoma nexuosulum Locard, E.A.A., 1897; Pleurotoma nivalis Loven, 1846 (basionym); Pleurotoma peregrinum Locard, E.A.A., 1897; Pleurotoma vacantivum Locard, E.A.A., 1897; Typhlomangelia nivale (Loven, 1846) (ending of species epithet must agree with current genus)

= Typhlomangelia nivalis =

Species of gastropod

Typhlomangelia nivalis is a species of sea snail, a marine gastropod mollusk in the family Borsoniidae.

== Description ==
The size of an adult shell varies between 12 mm and 27 mm. The turreted, white shell has a long spire with ten whorls. The periphery is tuberculated longitudinally. The ribs which give rise to them are very short. The shell is covered by close revolving striae. The shoulder of the whorls are slanting.

== Distribution ==
This species occurs in the Mediterranean Sea and in the Atlantic Ocean off the British Isles, Iceland, Norway, Spain, Portugal, the Azores, Senegal
