= Typhlomangelia polythele =

Scientific classification
- Kingdom: Animalia
- Phylum: Mollusca
- Class: Gastropoda
- Subclass: Caenogastropoda
- Order: Neogastropoda
- Superfamily: Conoidea
- Family: Borsoniidae
- Genus: Typhlomangelia
- Species: T. polythele

Binomial name
- Typhlomangelia polythele Barnard, 1963

Species of gastropod

Typhlomangelia polythele is a species of sea snail, a marine gastropod mollusk in the family Borsoniidae.

== Distribution ==
This marine species occurs off South Africa and in the Mozambique Channel.
