= Typhlomangelia cariosa =

Scientific classification
- Kingdom: Animalia
- Phylum: Mollusca
- Class: Gastropoda
- Subclass: Caenogastropoda
- Order: Neogastropoda
- Superfamily: Conoidea
- Family: Borsoniidae
- Genus: Typhlomangelia
- Species: T. cariosa

Binomial name
- Typhlomangelia cariosa (Watson, 1886)

Synonyms
- Pleurotoma (Typhlomangelia) cariosa Watson, 1886

Species of gastropod

Typhlomangelia cariosa is a species of sea snail, a marine gastropod mollusk in the family Borsoniidae.

== Distribution ==
This marine species is found off Kerguelen Islands
