= Typhlomangelia fluctuosa =

Scientific classification
- Kingdom: Animalia
- Phylum: Mollusca
- Class: Gastropoda
- Subclass: Caenogastropoda
- Order: Neogastropoda
- Superfamily: Conoidea
- Family: Borsoniidae
- Genus: Typhlomangelia
- Species: T. fluctuosa

Binomial name
- Typhlomangelia fluctuosa (Watson, 1881)

Synonyms
- Pleurotoma (Drillia) fluctuosa Watson, 1881

Species of gastropod

Typhlomangelia fluctuosa is a species of sea snail, a marine gastropod mollusk in the family Borsoniidae.

== Distribution ==
This species occurs in the Southern Indian Ocean off the Kerguelen Islands.
