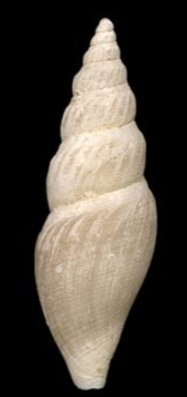
- Shell of Antarctospira angusteplicata (Specimen at the Smithsonian Institution)

Scientific classification
- Kingdom: Animalia
- Phylum: Mollusca
- Class: Gastropoda
- Subclass: Caenogastropoda
- Order: Neogastropoda
- Superfamily: Conoidea
- Family: Borsoniidae
- Genus: Antarctospira
- Species: A. angusteplicata

Binomial name
- Antarctospira angusteplicata (Strebel, 1905)

Synonyms
- Antarctospira paragenota (Powell, 1951); Bela angusteplicata Strebel, 1905 (original combination); Leucosyrinx angusteplicata (Strebel, 1905); Leucosyrinx paragenota Powell, 1951

= Antarctospira angusteplicata =

Species of gastropod

Antarctospira angusteplicata is a species of sea snail, a marine gastropod mollusk in the family Borsoniidae.

== Description ==
The length of the shell attains 21 mm.

(Original description in German) The shell is solid, white, and covered by a yellowish cuticle. The initial whorls of the protoconch possess a slightly inflated nucleus. Subsequent whorls initially diverge from the suture at a somewhat oblique, roof-like angle, then descend steeply, forming a blunt edge. The body whorl constricts below, culminating in a moderately long beak. The aperture is narrow, only slightly wider at its upper portion than the siphonal canal, which is recurved at the base. The columellar callus ascends almost vertically from the base before bending at a blunt angle towards the suture. A diagonal, ridge-like elevation extends across the callus, sloping down to the steep columellar base.

The sculpture consists of fine growth lines and narrow, low, yet sharply defined, folds. These folds appear compressed, often comprising two or three such folds pushed together. They are short, becoming weaker in the sinus area and, on the body whorl, barely extending beyond the midpoint. Near the aperture, these folds, though diminished, reach the base. Closely spaced, somewhat wavy spiral grooves are also present. These grooves become more closely set towards the base, where the interspaces appear as flatly arched rings. Approximately 40 such grooves are present on the body whorl.

== Distribution ==
This marine species occurs off the Falkland Islands and the Strait Of Magellan, Tierra del Fuego, Argentina, South Atlantic Ocean
