= Typhlomangelia powelli =

Scientific classification
- Kingdom: Animalia
- Phylum: Mollusca
- Class: Gastropoda
- Subclass: Caenogastropoda
- Order: Neogastropoda
- Superfamily: Conoidea
- Family: Borsoniidae
- Genus: Typhlomangelia
- Species: T. powelli

Binomial name
- Typhlomangelia powelli (Maxwell, 1988)

Extinct species of gastropod

Typhlomangelia powelli is an extinct species of sea snail, a marine gastropod mollusk in the family Borsoniidae.

== Distribution ==
This extinct marine species is endemic to New Zealand.
