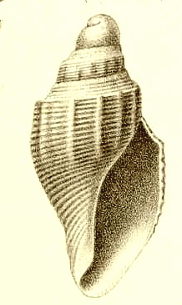
- Original image of a shell of Antarctospira principalis

Scientific classification
- Kingdom: Animalia
- Phylum: Mollusca
- Class: Gastropoda
- Subclass: Caenogastropoda
- Order: Neogastropoda
- Superfamily: Conoidea
- Family: Borsoniidae
- Genus: Antarctospira
- Species: A. principalis

Binomial name
- Antarctospira principalis (Thiele, 1912)

Synonyms
- Typhlomangelia principalis Thiele, 1912 (original combination)

= Antarctospira principalis =

Species of gastropod

Antarctospira principalis is a species of sea snail, a marine gastropod mollusk in the family Borsoniidae.

== Distribution ==
This species occurs in the Ross Sea, Antarctica.
