= McMurdo Sound =

Geographic location

Coordinates: 77°30′S 165°00′E

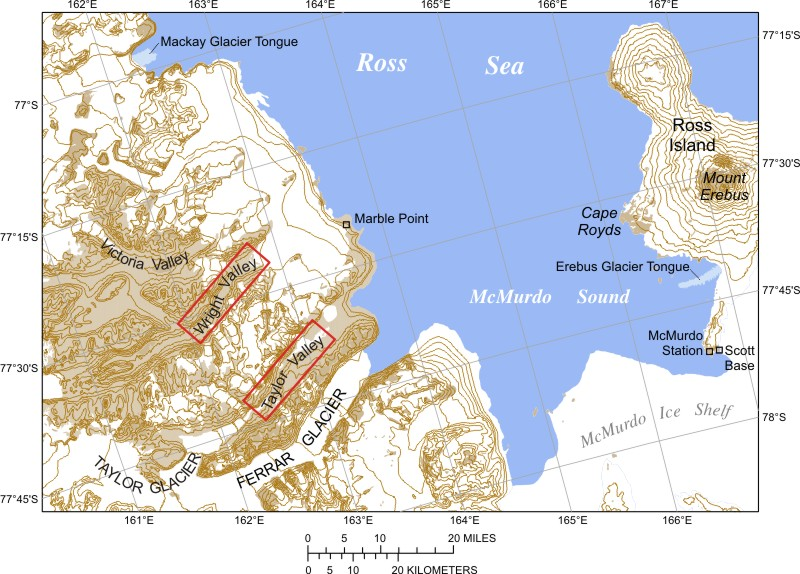
McMurdo Sound, Antarctica

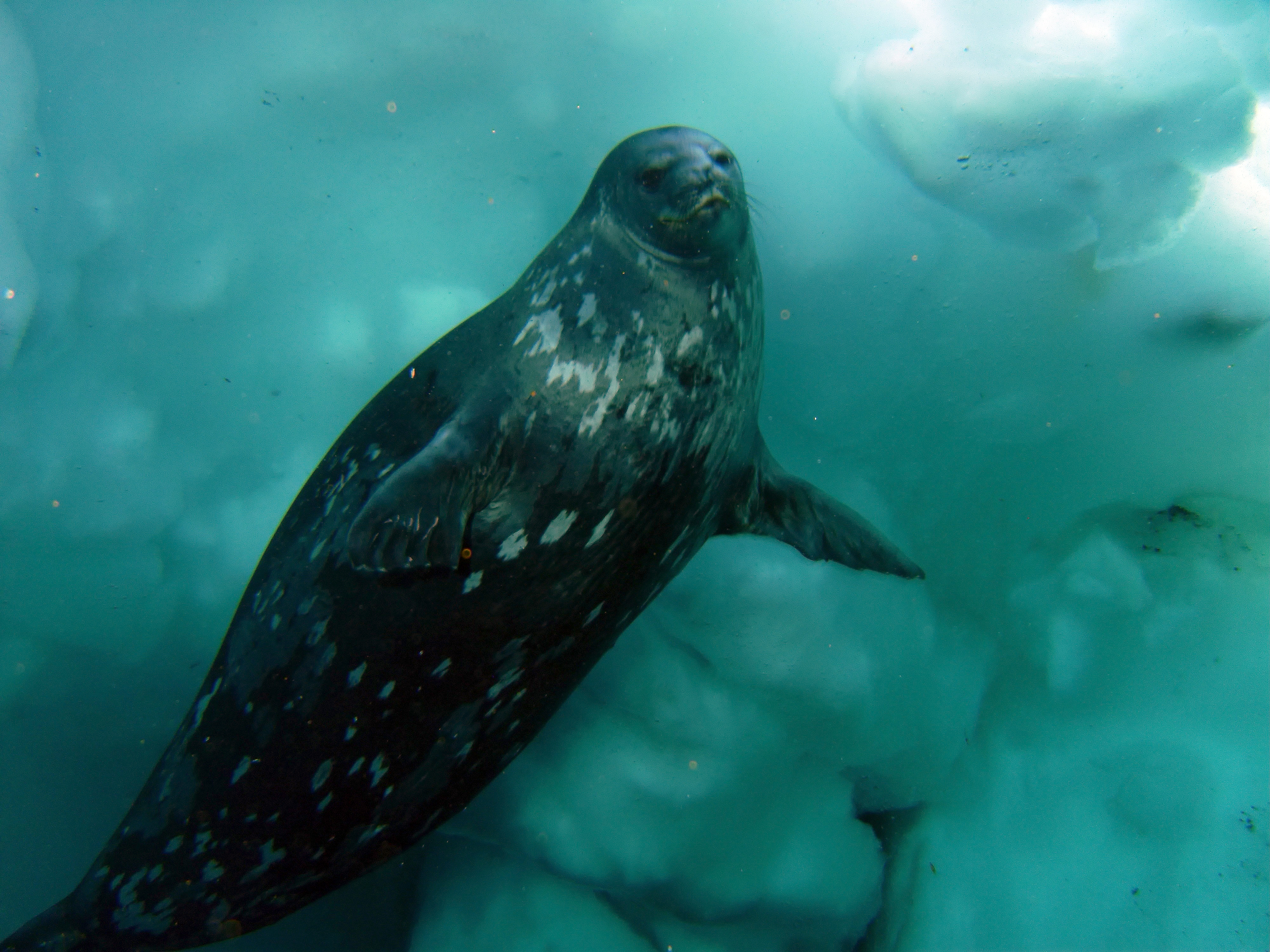
Weddell seal underwater in McMurdo Sound

The McMurdo Sound is a sound in Antarctica, known as the southernmost passable body of water in the world, located approximately 1,300 kilometres (810 mi) from the South Pole.

Captain James Clark Ross discovered the sound in February 1841 and named it after Lieutenant Archibald McMurdo of HMS Terror. The sound serves as a resupply route for cargo ships and airplanes that land on floating ice airstrips near McMurdo Station. The McMurdo seasonal Ice Runway was operated from October to December from the 1950s to the 2010s, then in December the ice breaks up and McMurdo port is opened by an Icebreaker ship and ships can resupply the Antarctic bases.

== Physical characteristics ==
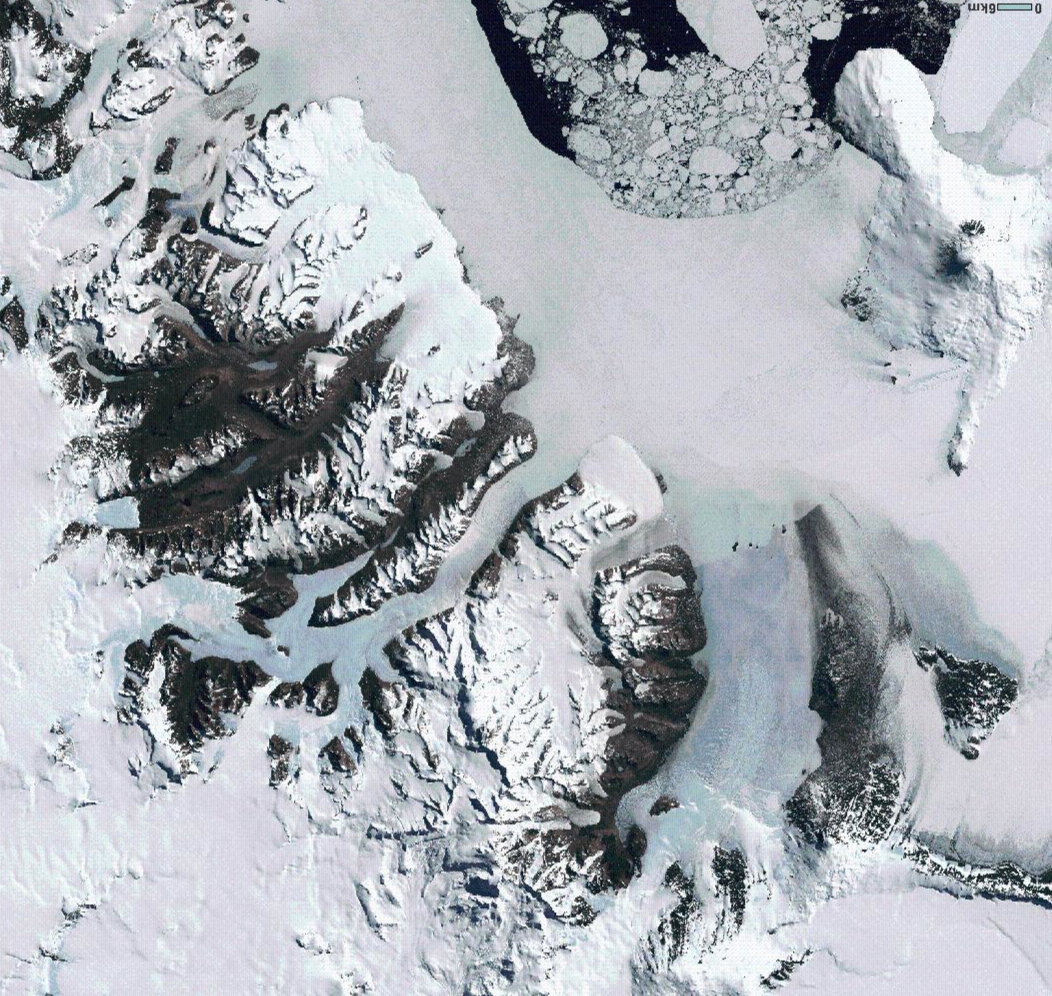
McMurdo sound, north is up.

=== Boundary and extents ===
The sound extends approximately 55 kilometers (34 mi) in length and width, and opens into the larger Ross Sea to the north. To the south, the sound is bounded by the Ross Ice Shelf cavity, to the west lies the Royal Society Range, and to the east is Ross Island. McMurdo Sound is separated from the McMurdo Ice Shelf (part of the Ross Ice Shelf) by the Haskell Strait. Winter Quarters Bay lies at the south end of the Sound and is the southernmost port on Earth.

=== Navigability ===
While the sound is navigable, it contains a significant amount of drift ice, especially along the shoreline of Winter Quarters Bay. The pack ice that girdles the shoreline at Winter Quarters Bay and elsewhere in the sound presents a considerable obstacle to surface ships. Vessels require ice-strengthened hulls and often have to rely upon escort by icebreakers. Less than 10 percent of McMurdo Sound's shoreline is free of ice.

During austral winter, McMurdo Sound presents a large expanse of surface ice. In summer, ships approaching the sound are often blocked by various amounts of first-year ice, fast ice (connected to the shoreline), and hard multi-year ice. Subsequently, icebreakers are required for maritime resupply missions to McMurdo Station.

Ross Island is the southernmost piece of land in Antarctica that is accessible by ship. In addition, the harbour at McMurdo's Winter Quarters Bay is the world's southernmost seaport (Department of Geography, Texas A&M University). The access by ships depends upon favorable ice conditions.

Tourism is increasingly popular in other parts of Antarctica but remains limited in McMurdo Sound due to the extreme sea conditions.

=== Temperatures ===
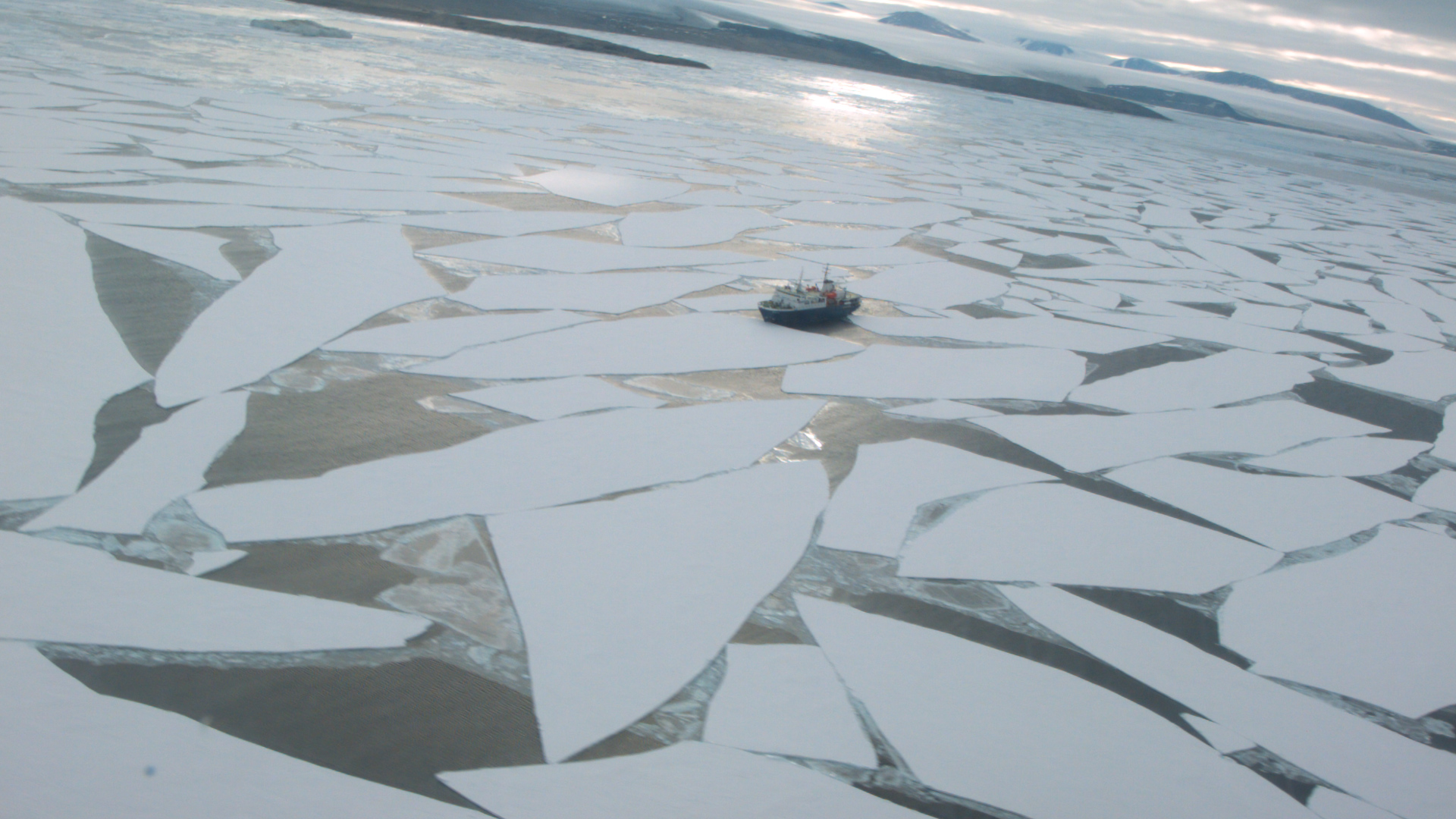
Ship navigates sea ice in McMurdo Sound

Cold circumpolar currents of the Southern Ocean shrink the flow of warm South Pacific or South Atlantic waters reaching McMurdo Sound and other Antarctic coastal waters. McMurdo Sound experiences katabatic winds from the Antarctic polar plateau. McMurdo Sound freezes over with sea ice about 3 metres (9.8 ft) thick during the winter. During the austral summer when the pack ice breaks up, wind and currents may push the ice northward into the Ross Sea, stirring up cold bottom currents that spill into the ocean basins. Temperatures during the winter months at McMurdo Station have dropped as low as −28 °C (−18 °F). December and January are the warmest months, with average highs at −4 °C (25 °F).

=== Effects of wind ===
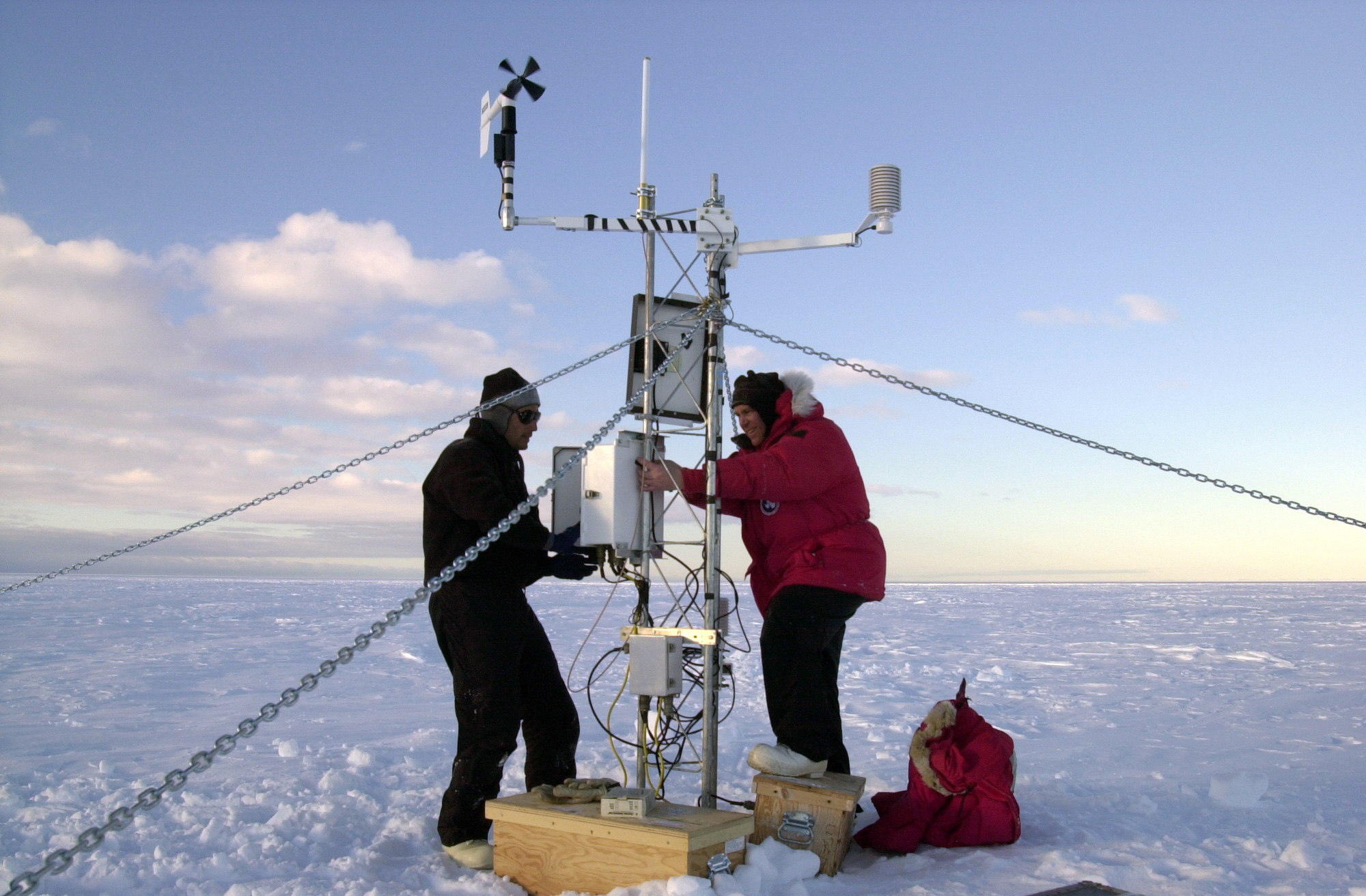
Weather instruments such as this device installed upon Iceberg B-15A provide scientists a better understanding of Antarctica's impact upon global climate.

Polar winds are a driving force behind weather systems arising from three surface zones that converge at McMurdo Sound: the polar plateau and the Transantarctic Mountains, the Ross Ice Shelf, and the Ross Sea. These surface zones create a range of dynamic weather systems. Cold, heavy air descending rapidly from the polar plateau at elevations of 3,000 metres (9,800 ft) or more spawns fierce katabatic winds. These dry winds can reach hurricane force when they reach the Antarctic coast. Wind instruments recorded Antarctica's highest wind velocity at the coastal station Dumont d'Urville in July 1972 at 320 kilometres per hour (200 mph) (Australian Government Antarctic Division).

Prevailing winds into McMurdo Sound shoot between mountain passes and other land formations, producing blizzards known locally as "Herbies". Such blizzards can occur any time of year. Residents of McMurdo Station and Scott Base have dubbed the nearby White Island and Black Island "Herbie Alley" due to winds that funnel blizzards between the islands (Field Manual for the U.S. Antarctic Program).

Overall the continent's extremely cold air does not hold enough moisture for significant snowfall. The annual snowfall on Ross Island averages only 17.6 centimetres (6.9 in). Snowfall in Antarctica's interior is far less at 5 centimetres (2.0 in). Snow seldom accumulates on the McMurdo Dry Valleys on the western shores of McMurdo Sound.

McMurdo Sound provides an important component in Antarctica's global effects upon climate. A key factor is the polar winds that can drive the sound's pack ice into the Ross Sea summer or winter. Frigid katabatic winds rake subsequently exposed water, causing sea ice to form. Freezing surface water excludes salt from the water below; leaving behind heavy, cold water that sinks to the ocean floor. This process repeats along Antarctica's coastal areas, spreading cold sea water into Earth's ocean basins.

According to an interview with climatologist Gerd Wendler, published in the National Science Foundation's Antarctic Sun, one could dive to the ocean floor anywhere in the world and encounter water from the coast of Antarctica. "Seventy-five percent of all the bottom water, wherever you are, comes from Antarctica."

=== Temperatures ===
- Average mean sea-level temp: −20 °C (−4 °F).
- Monthly mean range: −3 °C (27 °F) in January to −28 °C (−18 °F) in August.
- Stormiest months: February and October.

=== Wildlife ===
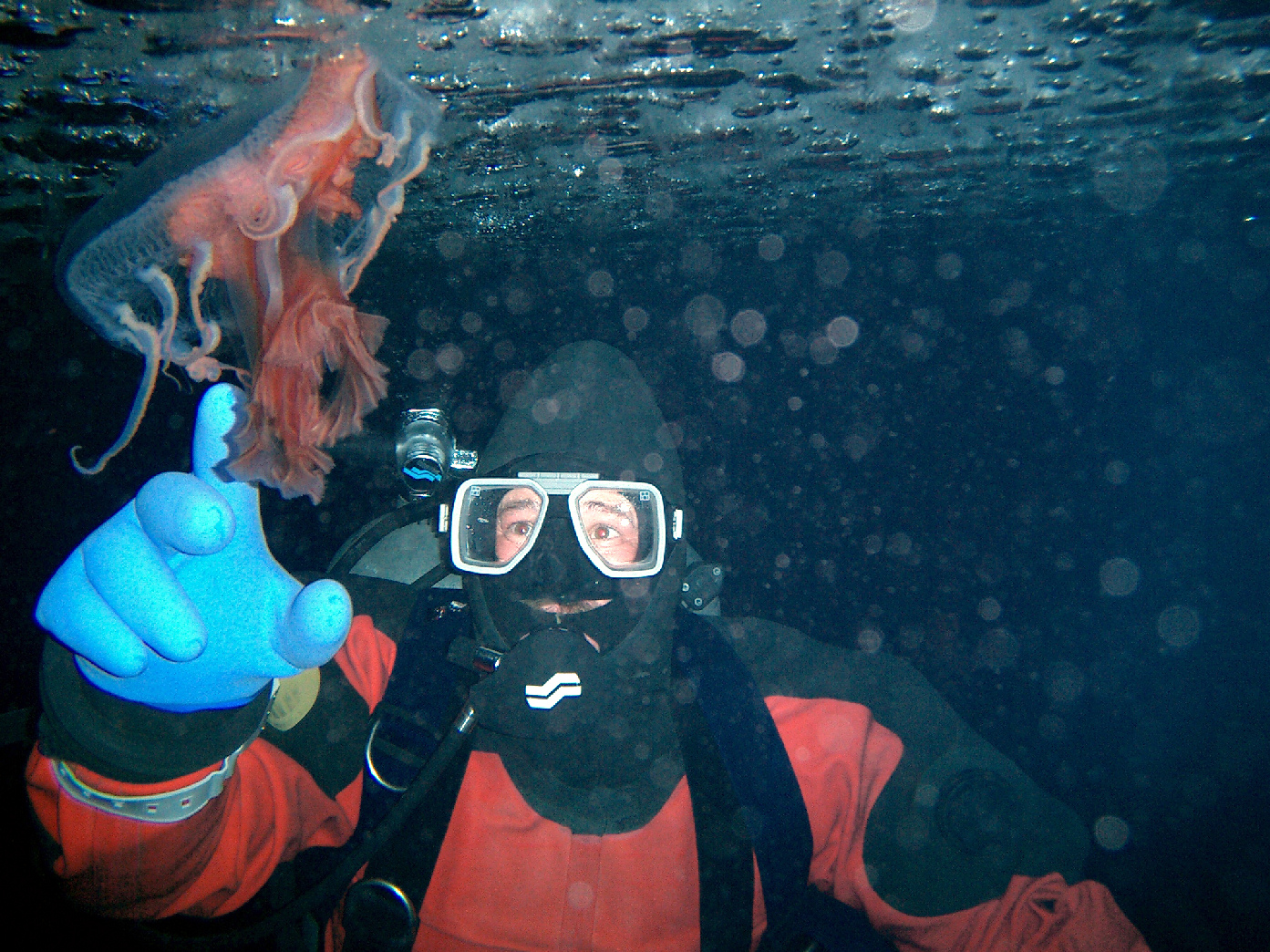
A research diver reaches towards a jellyfish that thrives in the −1.5 °C (29.3 °F) salt water of McMurdo Sound.

A rich sea life thrives under the barren expanse of McMurdo Sound's ice pack. Frigid waters that would kill many other fish in the world sustain the Antarctic notothenioid, a bony "ice fish" related to walleyes and perch. Cactus sponges, globe sponges, starfish, sea urchins, and sea anemones are also present. Large sea spiders inhabit the depths of the sound and feed on sea anemones. Antarctic krill flourish in the upper depths of the waters.

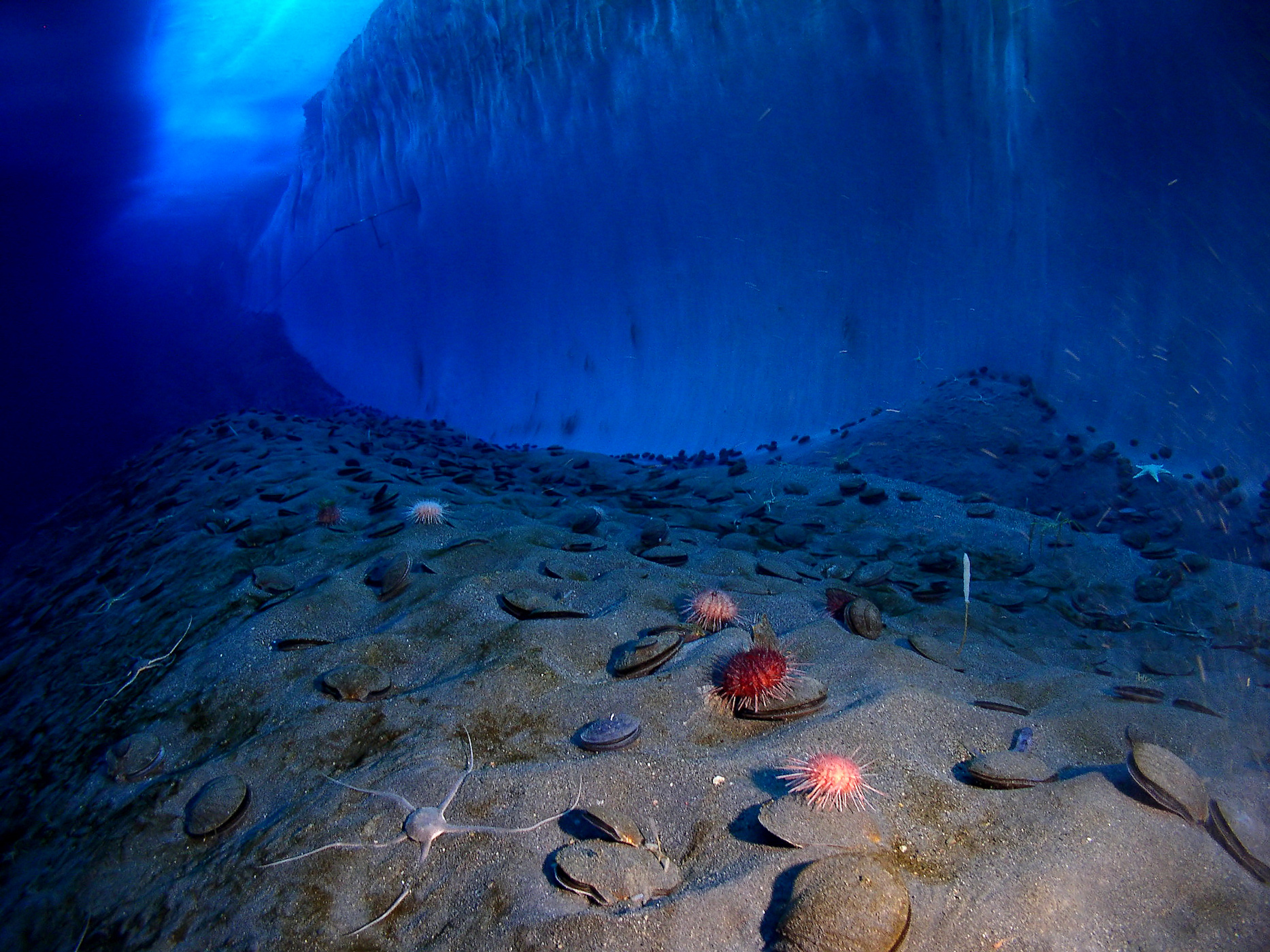
Underwater photo showing the diverse animal life in McMurdo Sound, including the scallop Adamussium colbecki, sea urchin Sterechinus neumayeri, sea sponge Homaxinella balfourensis, brittlestar Ophionotus victoriae and sea spider Colossendeis

Antarctic penguins, emperor penguins, and Adélie penguins live in and around the sound. The Weddell seal, leopard seal, and crabeater seal have been spotted, as well as orcas.

== Strategic importance ==
McMurdo Sound's role as a strategic waterway dates back to early 20th-century Antarctic exploration. British explorers Ernest Shackleton and Robert Scott built bases on the Sound's shoreline for their overland expeditions to the South Pole.

McMurdo Sound's logistic importance continues today. Aircraft transporting cargo and passengers land on frozen runways at Williams Field on the McMurdo Ice Shelf. Moreover, the annual sealift of a cargo ship and fuel tanker rely upon the sound as a supply route to the continent's largest base, the United States McMurdo Station. Both the U.S. base and New Zealand's nearby Scott Base are on the southern tip of Ross Island.

== Iceberg B-15A ==
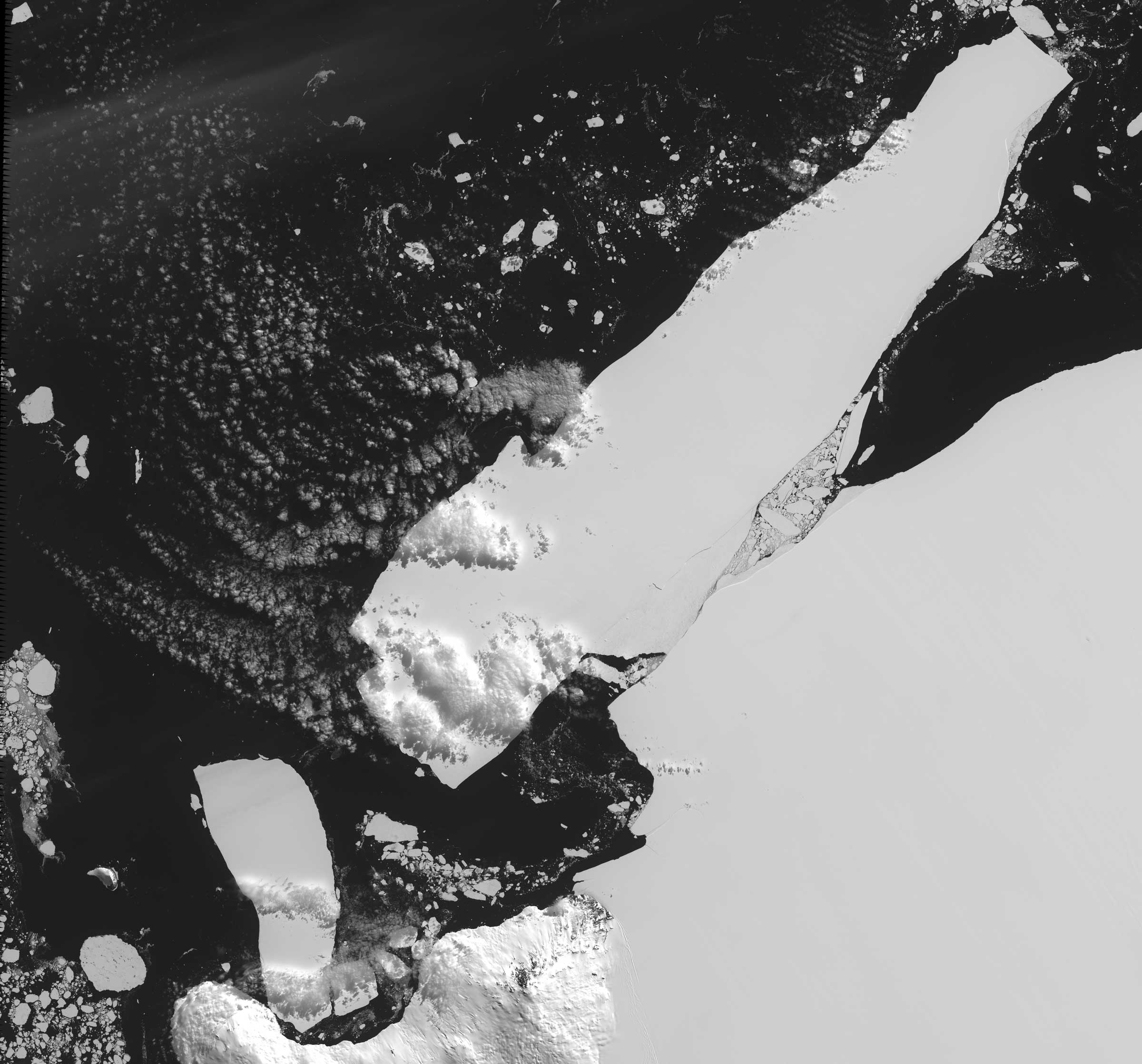
An iceberg that calved off Iceberg B-15 caused extensive pack ice buildup in McMurdo Sound, blocking shipping and preventing penguin access to open water.

In March 2000, the 282-kilometre (175 mi) long Iceberg B-15, the largest ever seen at the time, broke off from the Ross Ice Shelf (Antarctic Climate & Ecosystems: Cooperative Research Center) and then suddenly broke up on 27 October 2005.

Research based upon measurements retrieved from a seismometer previously placed on B-15 indicated that ocean swells caused by an earthquake 13,000 kilometres (8,100 mi) away in the Gulf of Alaska caused the breakup, according to a report by the U.S. National Public Radio. Wind and sea currents shifted the smaller, but still massive Iceberg B-15A towards McMurdo Sound. B-15A's girth temporarily blocked the outflow of pack ice from McMurdo Sound.

Iceberg B-15A's grounding at the mouth of McMurdo Sound also blocked the path for thousands of penguins to reach their food source in open water. Moreover, pack ice built up behind the iceberg in the Ross Sea creating a nearly 150-kilometre (81 nmi) frozen barrier that blocked two cargo ships en route to supply McMurdo Station, according to the National Science Foundation.

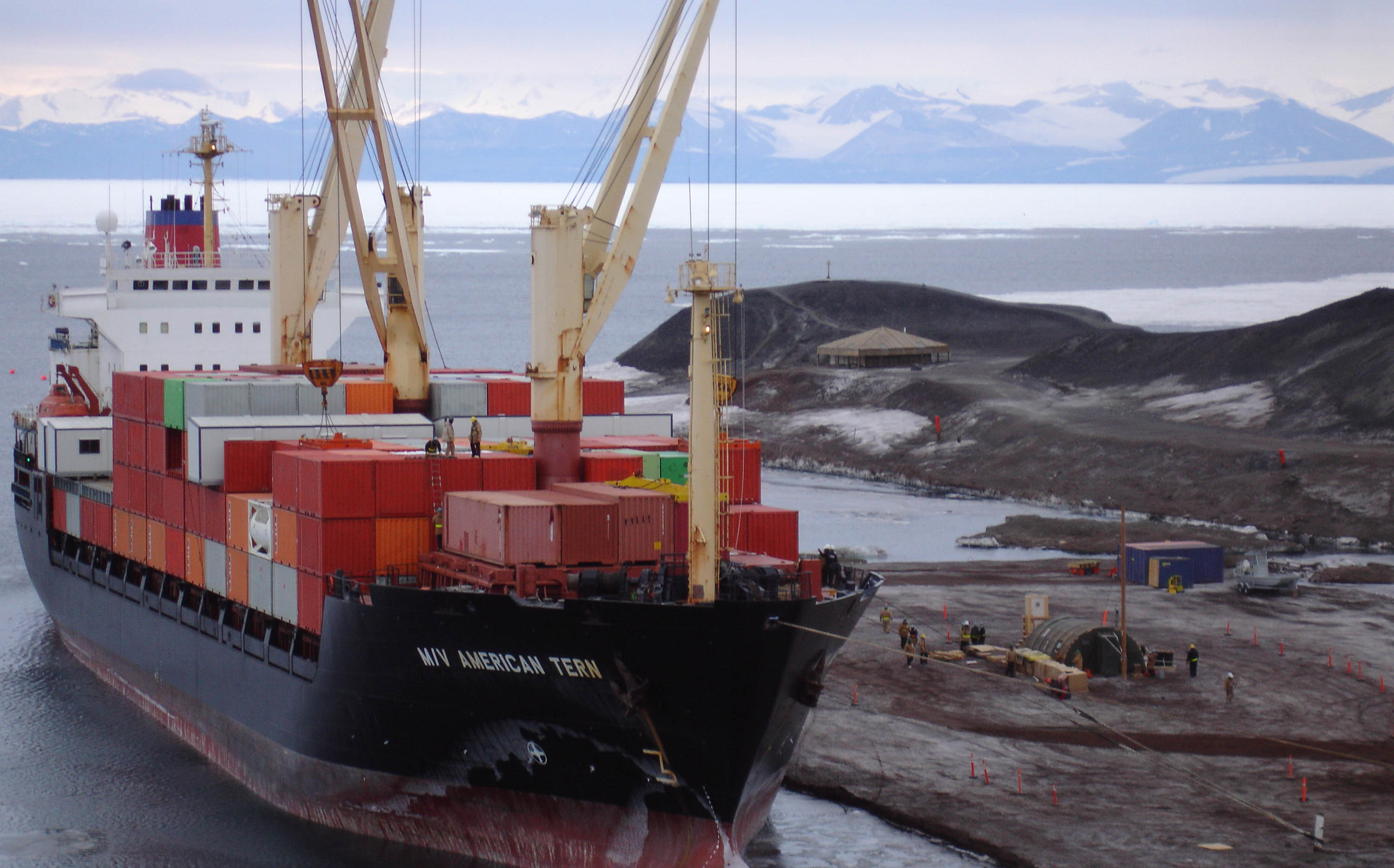
MV American Tern bringing supplies for McMurdo Station

The icebreakers USCGC Polar Star and the Russian Krasin were required to open a ship channel through ice up to 3 metres (9.8 ft) thick. The last leg of the channel followed a route along the eastern shoreline of McMurdo Sound adjacent to Ross Island. The icebreakers escorted the tanker USNS Paul Buck to McMurdo Station's ice pier in late January. The freighter MV American Tern followed on 3 February.

Similar pack ice blocked a National Geographic expedition aboard the 34-metre (112 ft) Braveheart from reaching B-15A. However, expedition divers were able to explore the underwater world of another grounded tabular iceberg. They encountered a surprising environment of fish and other sea life secreted within a deep iceberg crevasse. Discoveries included starfish, crabs, and ice fish. The latter were found to have burrowed thumb-sized holes into the ice.

The expedition reported witnessing an iceberg exploding. Shards of ice erupted into the air as if a bomb went off only hours after divers surfaced and after the Braveheart moved away from the iceberg (National Geographic).

== Pollution ==
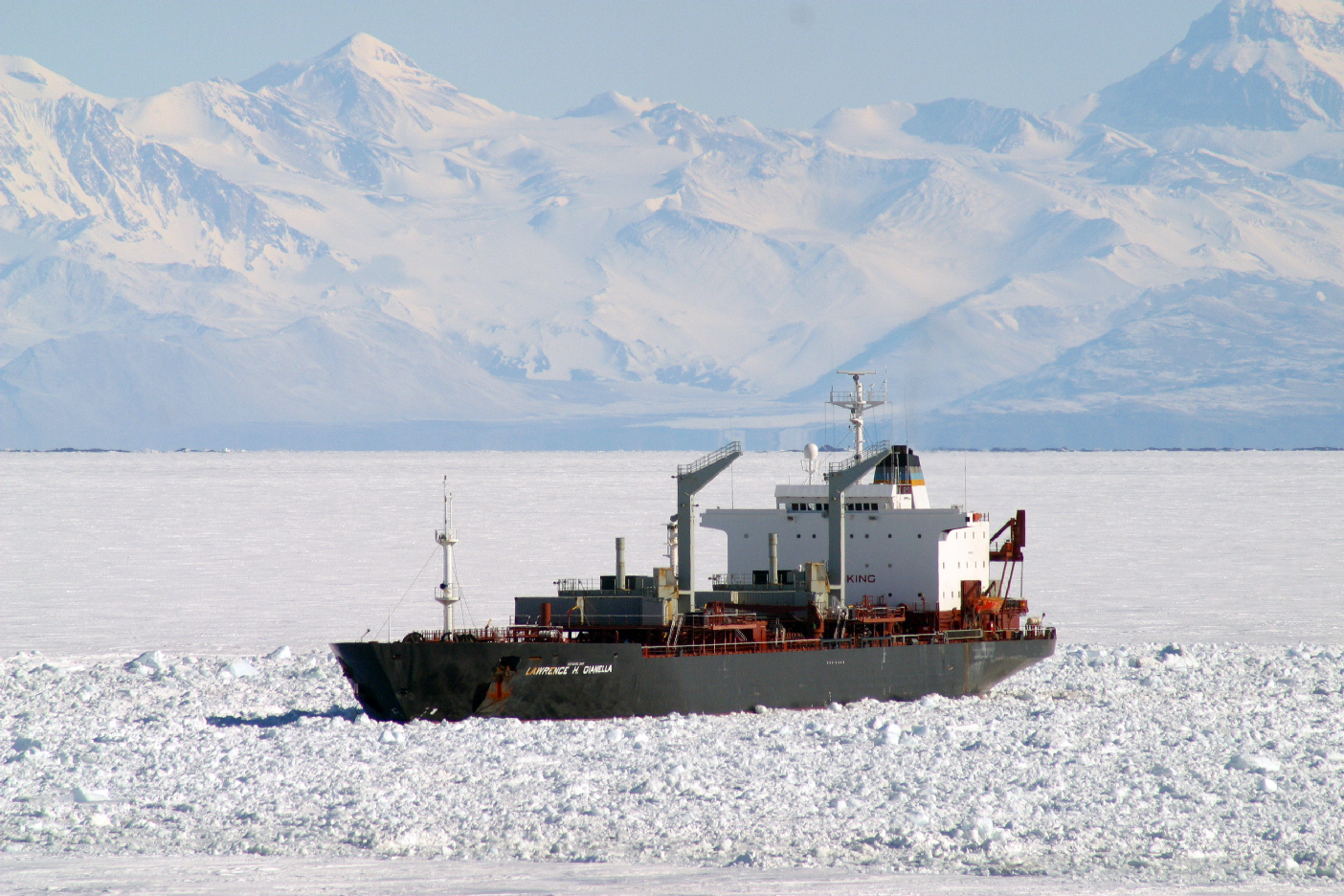
The tanker USNS Lawrence N. Gianella on standby at Winter Quarters Bay near McMurdo Station. Photograph by: Peter Rejcek. National Science Foundation.

More than 50 years of continuous operation of the United States and New Zealand bases on Ross Island have left pockets of severe pollution in McMurdo Sound. Until 1981, McMurdo Station residents simply towed their garbage out to the sea ice and let nature take its course. The garbage sank to the sea floor when the ice broke up in the spring, according to news reports.

A 2001 survey of the seabed near McMurdo revealed 15 vehicles, 26 shipping containers, and 603 fuel drums, as well as some 1,000 miscellaneous items dumped on an area of some 20 hectares (49 acres). Findings by scuba divers were reported in the State of the Environment Report, a New Zealand-sponsored study.

The study by the government agency Antarctica New Zealand revealed that decades of pumping thousands of gallons of raw sewage from 1,200 summer residents into the sound had fouled Winter Quarters Bay. The pollution ended in 2003 when a $5 million waste treatment plant went online. Other documented bay water contaminants include leakage from an open dump at the station. The dump introduced heavy metals, petroleum compounds, and chemicals into the water.

A study by the Australian Institute of Marine Science found that anti-fouling paints on the hulls of icebreakers are polluting McMurdo Sound. Such paints kill algae, barnacles, and other marine life that adhere to ship hulls. Scientists found that samples taken from the ocean floor contained high levels of tributyltin (TBT), a component of the anti-fouling paints. "The levels are close to the maximum you will find anywhere, apart from ship grounding sites", said Andrew Negri of the institute.

Ships, aircraft, and land-based operations in McMurdo Sound all present hazards of oil spills or fuel leaks. For instance, in 2003, the build-up of two years of difficult ice conditions blocked the U.S. tanker MV Richard G. Matthiesen from reaching the harbour at McMurdo Station, despite the assistance of icebreakers. Instead, shore workers rigged a temporary 5.6-kilometre (3.5 mi) fuel line over the ice pack to discharge the ship's cargo. The ship pumped more than 23 million litres (6.1 million US gallons) of fuel to storage facilities at McMurdo.

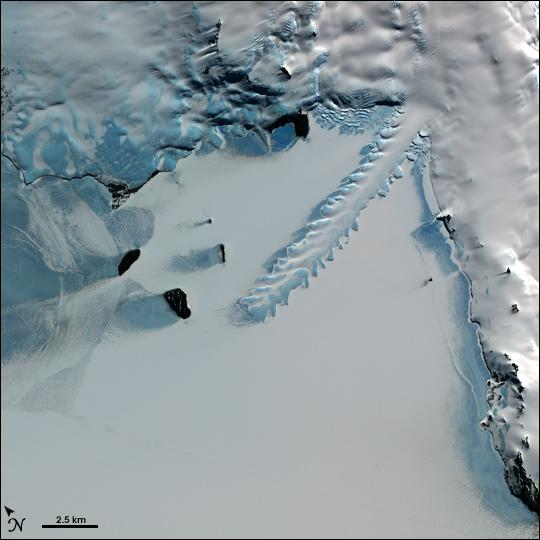
The Erebus Glacier Tongue near the ship channel used during annual resupply missions to McMurdo Station (NASA)

Officials balance the potential for fuel spills inherent in such operations against the critical need to keep McMurdo Station supplied with oil. A fuel tank spill in an unrelated onshore incident in 2003 spilt roughly 25,000 litres (6,600 US gallons) of Diesel fuel at a helicopter pad at McMurdo Station. The 1989 grounding of the Argentinean ship Bahía Paraíso and subsequent spillage of 640,000 litres (170,000 US gallons) of oil into the sea near the Antarctic Peninsula showed the environmental hazards inherent in supply missions to Antarctica.

Zoologist Clive Evans from Auckland University described McMurdo's harbor as "one of the most polluted harbors in the world in terms of oil", according to a 2004 article by the New Zealand Herald.

=== Cleanup efforts ===
Modern operations in McMurdo Sound have sparked surface cleanup efforts, recycling, and exporting trash and other contaminants by ship. The U.S. National Science Foundation began a 5-year, $30-million cleanup program in 1989, according to Reuters News Agency. The concentrated effort targeted the open dump at McMurdo. By 2003, the U.S. Antarctic Program reported recycling approximately 70% of its wastes, according to Australia's Herald Sun.

The 1989 cleanup included workers testing hundreds of barrels at the dump site, mostly full of fuels and human waste, for identification before they were loaded onto a freighter for exportation. The precedent for exporting waste began in 1971. The United States shipped out tons of radiation-contaminated soil after officials shut down a small nuclear power plant.

== Tourism ==
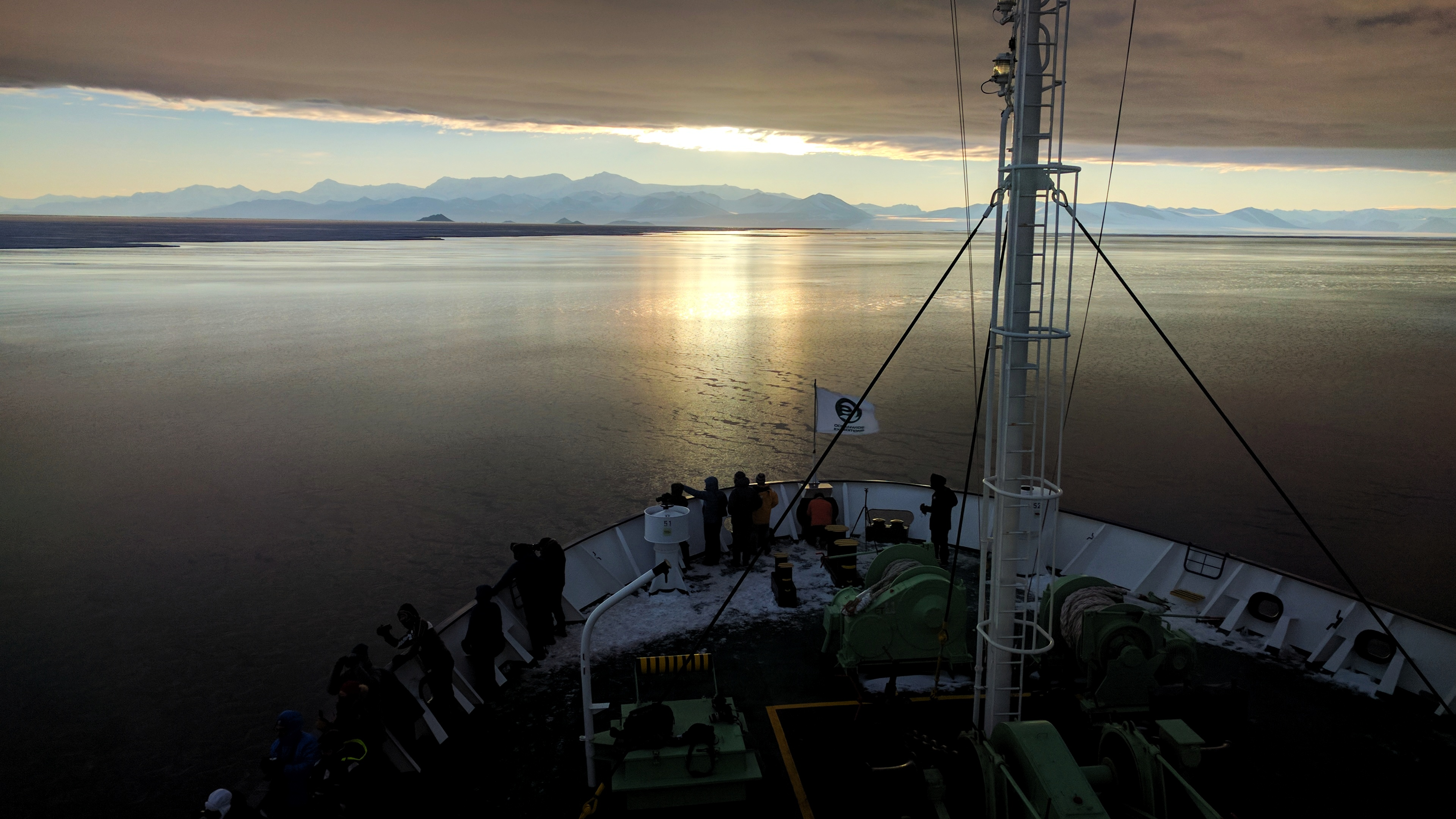
Sunset on McMurdo sound from bow of antarctic cruise ship

Antarctica's extreme remoteness and hazardous travel conditions limit Antarctica tourism to an expensive niche industry largely centered on the Antarctic Peninsula. The number of seaborne tourists grew more than four times throughout the 1990s, reaching more than 14,000 by 2000, up from 2,500 just a decade earlier. More than 46,000 airborne and seaborne tourists visited Antarctica during the 2007–2008 season, according to the International Association of Antarctic Tour Operators (IAATO).

This confederation of tour operators reports that only 5% of Antarctic tourists visit the Ross Sea area, which encompasses McMurdo Sound. Tourists congregate on the ice-free coastal zones during summer near the Antarctic Peninsula. The peninsula's wildlife, soaring mountains, and dramatic seascapes have drawn commercial visitors since the late 1950s, when Argentina and Chile operated cruises to the South Shetland Islands.

Tourists flights began in 1957, when a Pan American Boeing 377 Stratocruiser made the first civilian flight to Antarctica. Commercial flights landed at McMurdo Sound and the South Pole in the 1960s. Routine overflights from Australia and New Zealand took place between 1977 and 1980, transporting more than 11,000 passengers, according to Antarctica New Zealand, which manages Scott Base. One such flight, Air New Zealand Flight 901, crashed into Mount Erebus on the eastern shores of McMurdo Sound. The impact, occurring in sector whiteout into the lower slopes of the active volcano, took the lives of all 257 people aboard the aircraft.

In 1969 the MS Explorer brought seagoing tourists to Antarctica (British Antarctic Survey). The cruise's founder, Lars-Eric Lindblad, coupled expeditionary cruising with education. He is quoted as saying, "You can't protect what you don't know" (IAATO). In the decades since then, ships engaged in Antarctic sightseeing cruises have grown in size and number.

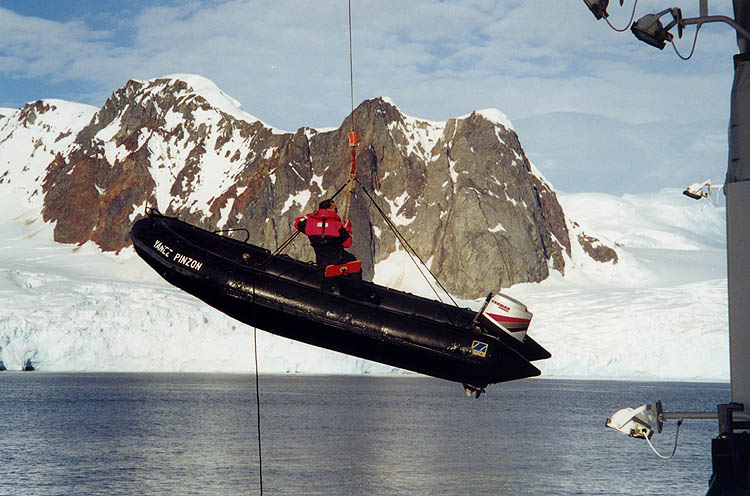
A Zodiac inflatable is hoisted aboard an expedition cruise ship in Antarctic waters after ferrying passengers to shore.

Infrequent Antarctic cruises have included passenger vessels carrying up to 960 tourists (IAATO). Such vessels may conduct so-called "drive-by" cruises, with no landings made ashore.

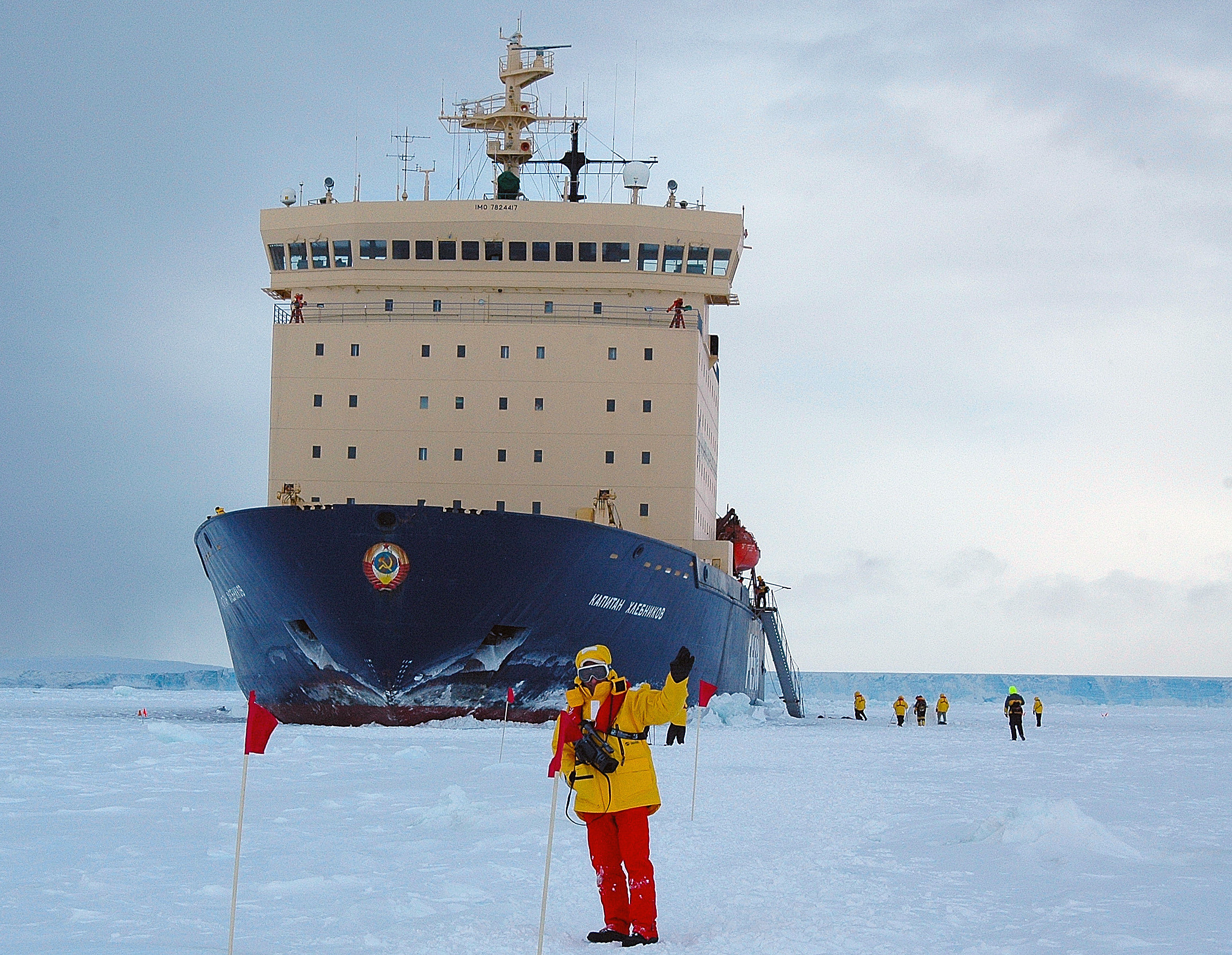
The Russian icebreaker Kapitan Khlebnikov in the Arctic

The Russian icebreaker Kapitan Khlebnikov (picture to the right) has conducted voyages to the Weddell Sea and Ross Sea regions since 1992. High-latitude cruises in dense pack ice are only achievable during the austral summer season, November into March. In 1997, the vessel Kapitan Khlebnikov claimed the distinction of being the first ship to circumnavigate Antarctica with passengers (Quark Expeditions). Passengers aboard the icebreaker make landings aboard Zodiac inflatable boats to explore remote beaches. Their itinerary may also include stops at Ross Island's historic explorer huts at Discovery Point near McMurdo Station or Cape Royds (Antarctica New Zealand). Additionally, the Russian icebreaker extends the reach of tourism by launching helicopter trips from its decks, including visits to sites such as the McMurdo Dry Valleys and areas noted for wildlife viewing.

The 'Spirit of Enderby has been conducting cruises to the Ross Sea region for many years, including McMurdo Sound. Although the Enderby has an ice-strengthened hull, the ship is not an icebreaker. The Enderby sports Zodiac inflatable boats, a hovercraft for Antarctica voyages, and all-terrain vehicles for over ice or overland travel. Land-based tourism in Antarctica, however, continues to be rare. Antarctica lacks a permanent land-based tourism facility, despite the annual surge in the number of visitors.

The International Association of Tour Operators (IAATO) has established voluntary standards to discourage tourists from disrupting wildlife. Nonetheless, large ships, carrying more than 400 passengers, may spend up to 12 hours transporting tourists to and from breeding sites. Such large-ship operations expose wildlife to humans far longer than smaller vessels.

== Prominent features ==
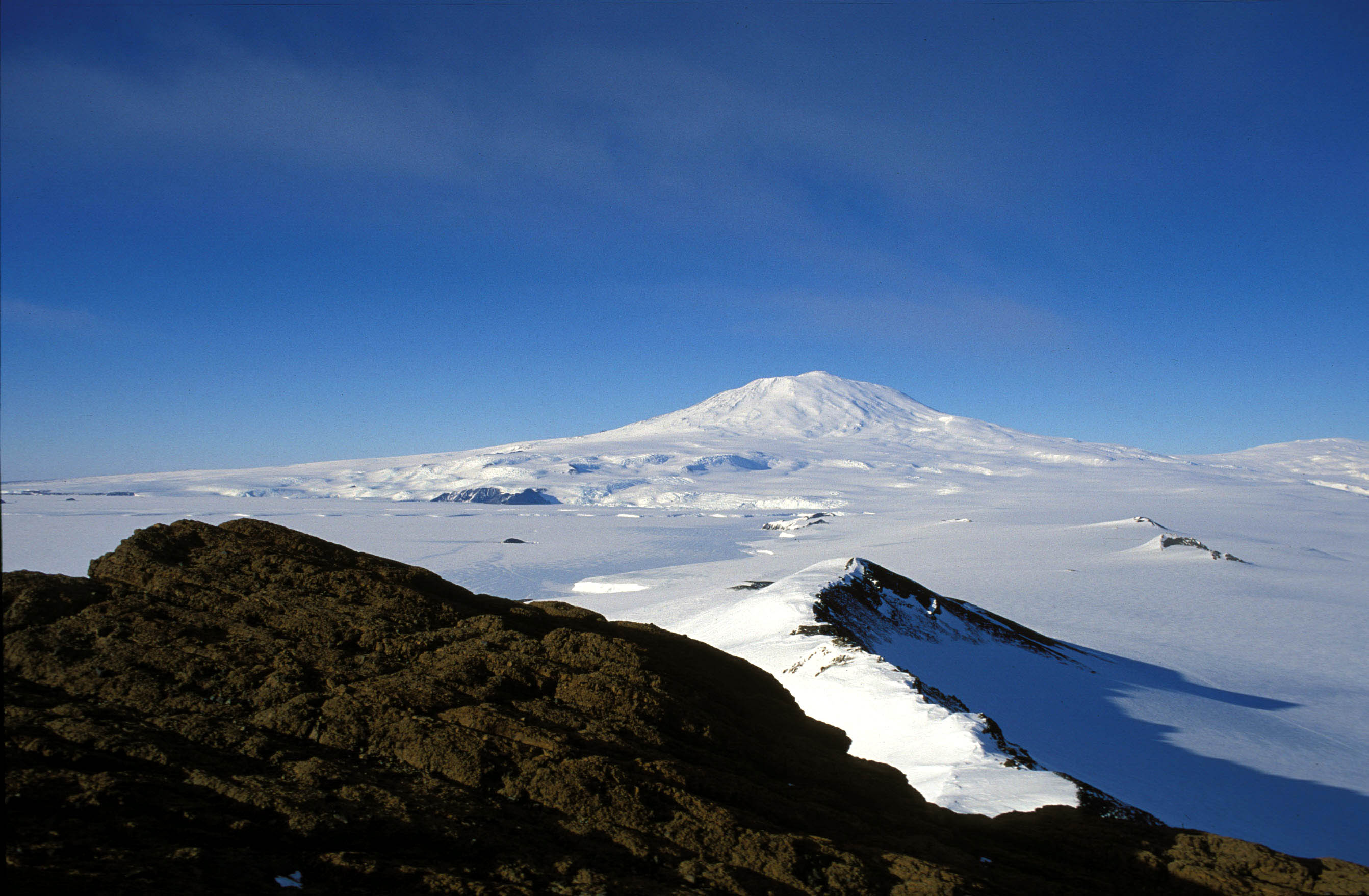
Mount Erebus in Antarctica from Castle Rock, near McMurdo Station

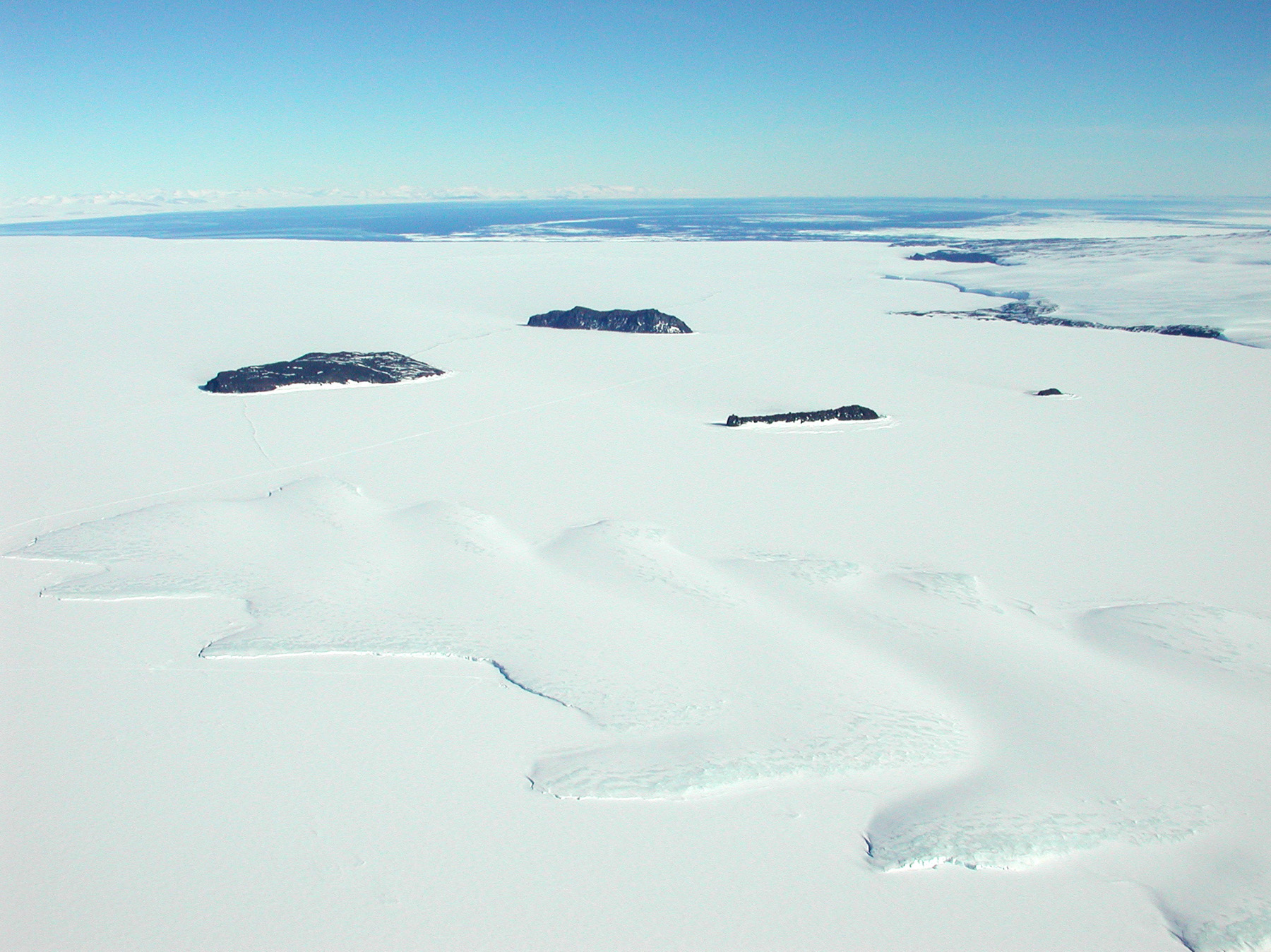
Looking north at Erebus Ice tongue with, from left the right, the islands of Tent, Inaccessible, Big Razorback and Little Razorback

- Beaufort Island – This small island at the northern entrance to McMurdo Sound is a protected area due to its site as a penguin rookery.
- Black Island – This island is west of nearby White Island and is about 25 miles (40 km) from McMurdo Station. An unmanned telecommunications base is here.
- Cape Royds – This is a protected area with the most southerly Adélie penguin colony (Antarctica New Zealand). The site features an expedition hut built by Ernest Shackleton and his crew of the Nimrod in 1907 on the western shore of Ross Island.
- Discovery Point – Also called Hut Point, this location overlooking Winter Quarters Bay is the site of the expedition hut built by the British Antarctic Expedition (1901–1904) led by Robert Falcon Scott.
- Glacier Ice Tongues – The Erebus Glacier Tongue projects 11–12 kilometres (6.8–7.5 mi) from the coastline and reaches up to 10 metres (33 ft) in height. Ice flowing rapidly from the glacier at the base of Mount Erebus forms the ice structure. MacKay Glacier Tongue is across the sound to the northwest at Granite Harbor.
- McMurdo Dry Valleys – This row of valleys on the western shore are so named because of their extremely low humidity and their lack of snow or ice cover.
- McMurdo Ice Shelf – This floating ice shelf forms the southern boundary of McMurdo Sound and is itself part of the larger Ross Ice Shelf.
- Mount Discovery – This isolated volcanic cone on the western shore of McMurdo Sound reaches 2,681 metres (8,796 ft) in height.
- Mount Erebus – This mountain is the southernmost active volcano on Earth. (Antarctic Connection). The mountain reaches 3,794 metres (12,448 ft) in height and is on Ross Island.
- Ross Island – This island features four principal volcanoes: Mount Erebus, Mount Terror, Mount Bird, and Mount Terra Nova. The United States and New Zealand scientific bases are on the southern end of the island.
- Royal Society Range – This volcanic range is part of the Transantarctic Mountains, one of the world's longest mountain chains (Antarctic Connection). The Royal Society Range is on McMurdo Sound's southwestern shore.
- White Island – The McMurdo Ice Shelf encircles White Island, which is visible from Scott Base. A perennial tidal crack in the ice permits Weddell seals to live on the island year-round. (Texas A&M University at Galveston LABB)

== Gallery ==
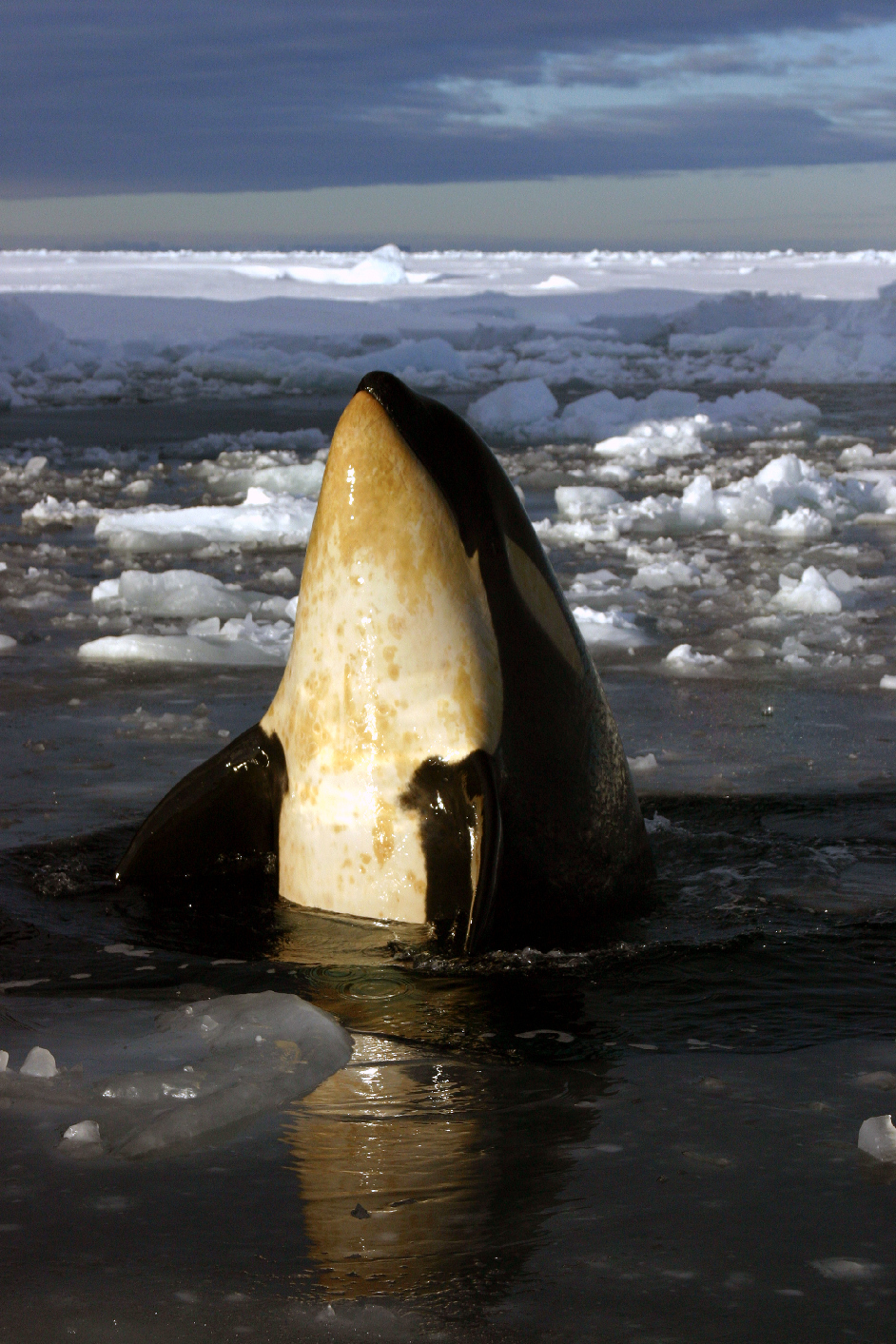
Orca whale off Ross Island

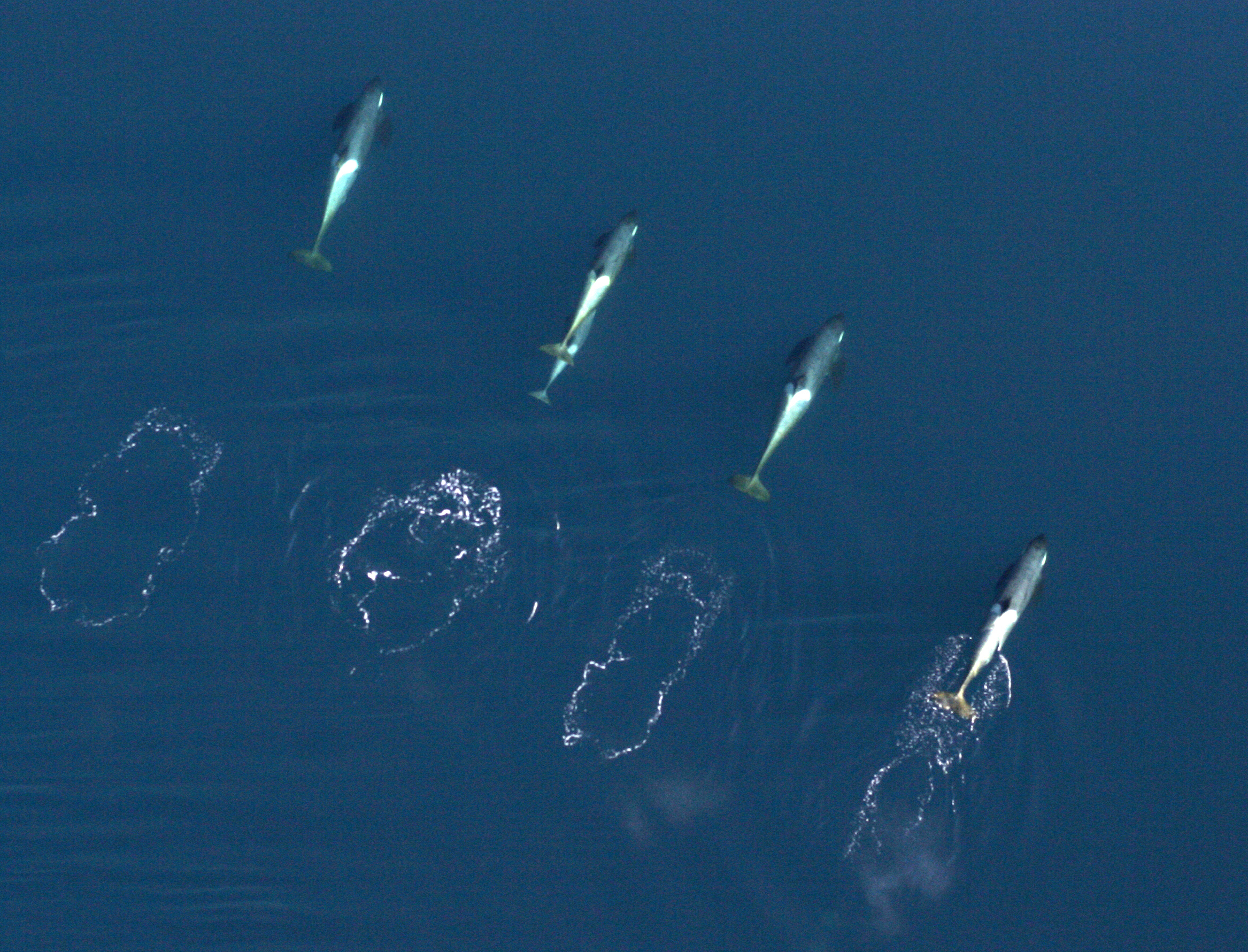
Orcas in McMurdo Sound

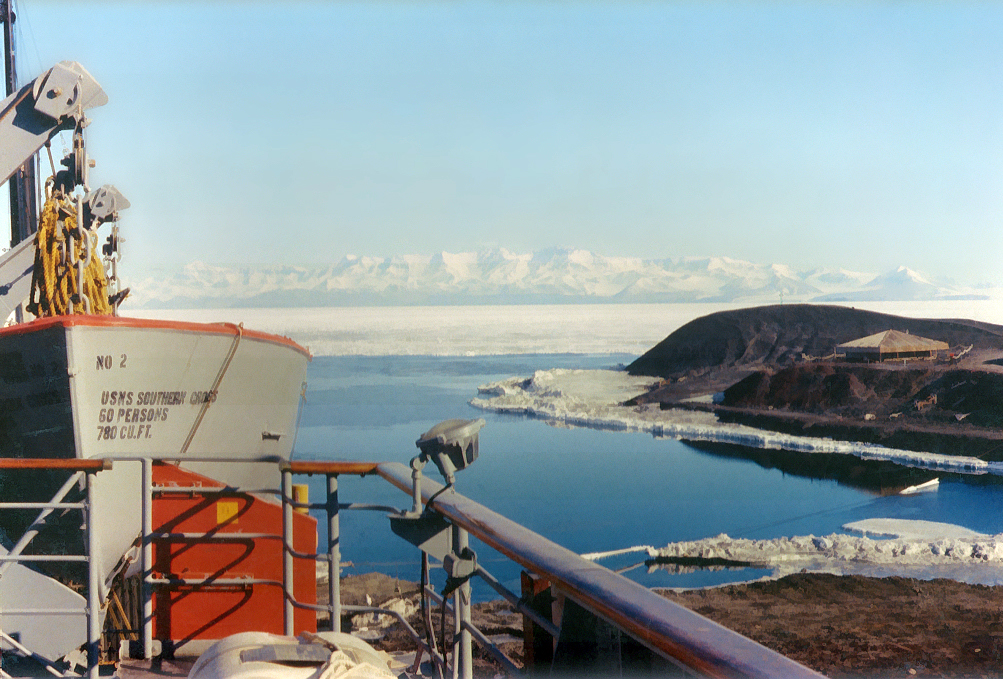
Winter Quarters Bay at McMurdo Station

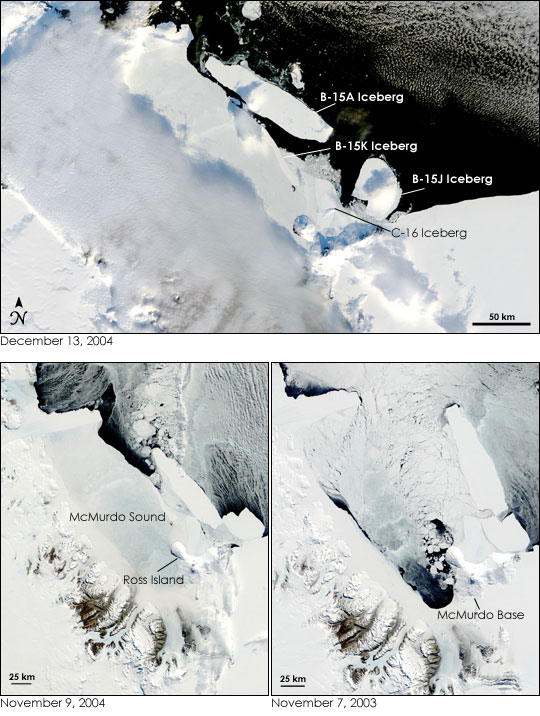
Iceberg B-15A at McMurdo Sound

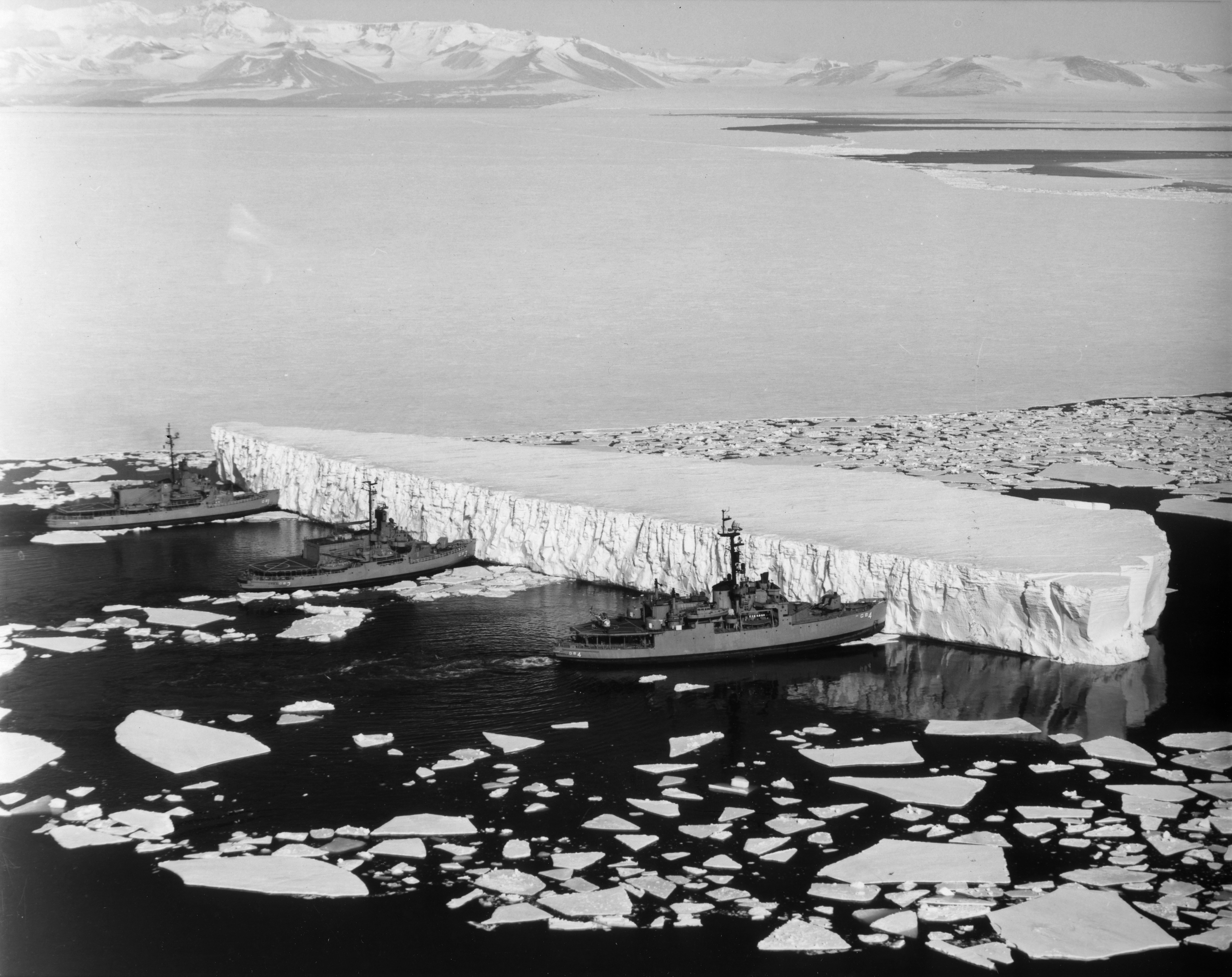
Icebreakers near McMurdo Station, 29 December 1965

== See also ==
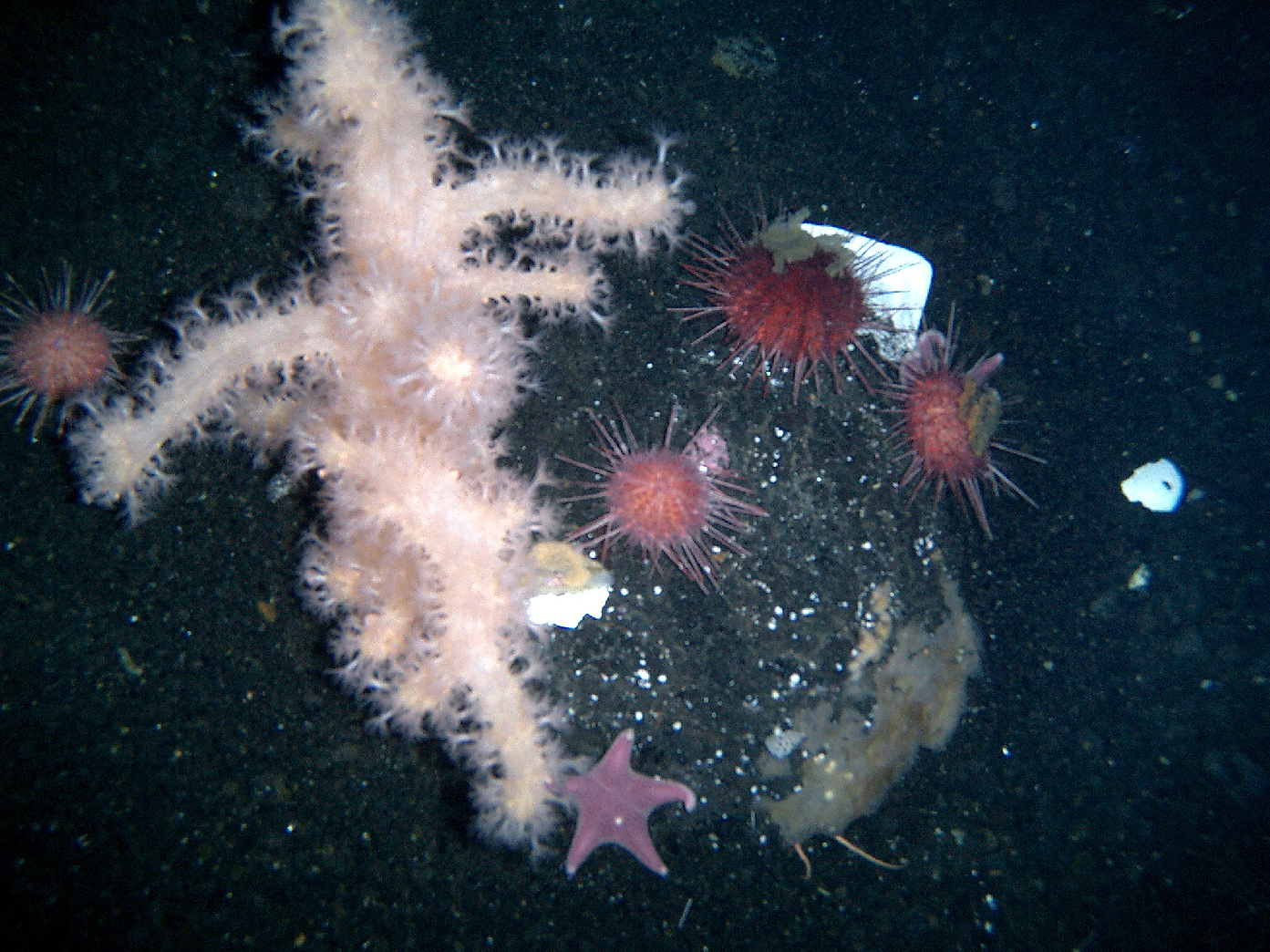
Sea urchins, soft coral, and seastars on the floor of McMurdo Sound, 2005

- Marble Point
- McMurdo Station
- Ross Sea
- Scott Base
- Williams Field
- Winter Quarters Bay
- Sea ice
- Iceberg
