= MV American Tern =

American container ship

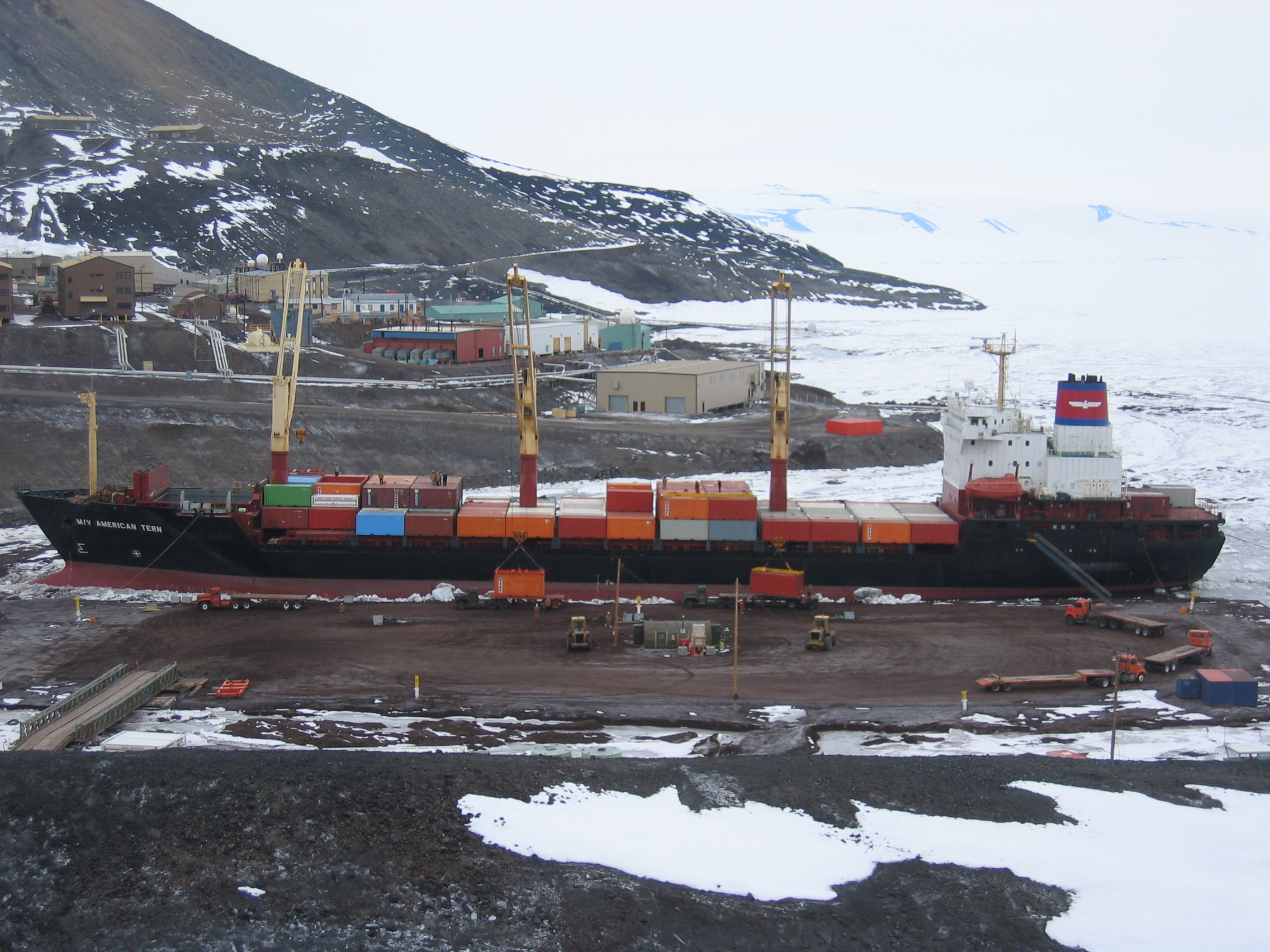
- American Tern (T-AK-4729)

History

United States
- Name: Serenity (1990–1996); Kariba (1996–1997); Torm Africa (1997–1999); Kariba (1999–2000); Lykes Flyer (2000); Kariba (2000); Kota Agung (2000–2002); Kariba (2002); American Tern (2002–2011); Tern (2011)
- Owner: American President Lines
- Operator: Military Sealift Command (Chartered)
- Builder: VEB Schiffswerft Neptun, Rostock, Germany
- Launched: 16 December 1989
- Out of service: 2010
- Identification: Call sign WAHF; IMO number: 8908088; MMSI number: 369113000
- Fate: Scrapped in 2010

General characteristics
- Type: Container ship
- Tonnage: 13,382 gt 17,175 dwt
- Displacement: 8,650 long tons (8,789 t)
- Length: 521 ft (159 m)
- Beam: 76 ft (23 m)
- Draft: 33 ft (10 m)
- Speed: 16 knots (30 km/h; 18 mph)
- Complement: 21 contract mariners

MV American Tern (T-AK-4729) is a container ship managed by APL Maritime. Formerly the Liberian-flagged Kariba, the vessel was renamed American Tern under the United States flag in 2002. Since then, the American Tern has been chartered by the United States Navy Military Sealift Command. She was contracted through 2010 to make resupply voyages to McMurdo Station in Antarctica (Operation Deep Freeze) and Pituffik Space Base in Greenland (Operation Pacer Goose). The vessel is named after the tern, a type of bird that makes annual migrations from the Arctic to the Antarctic.

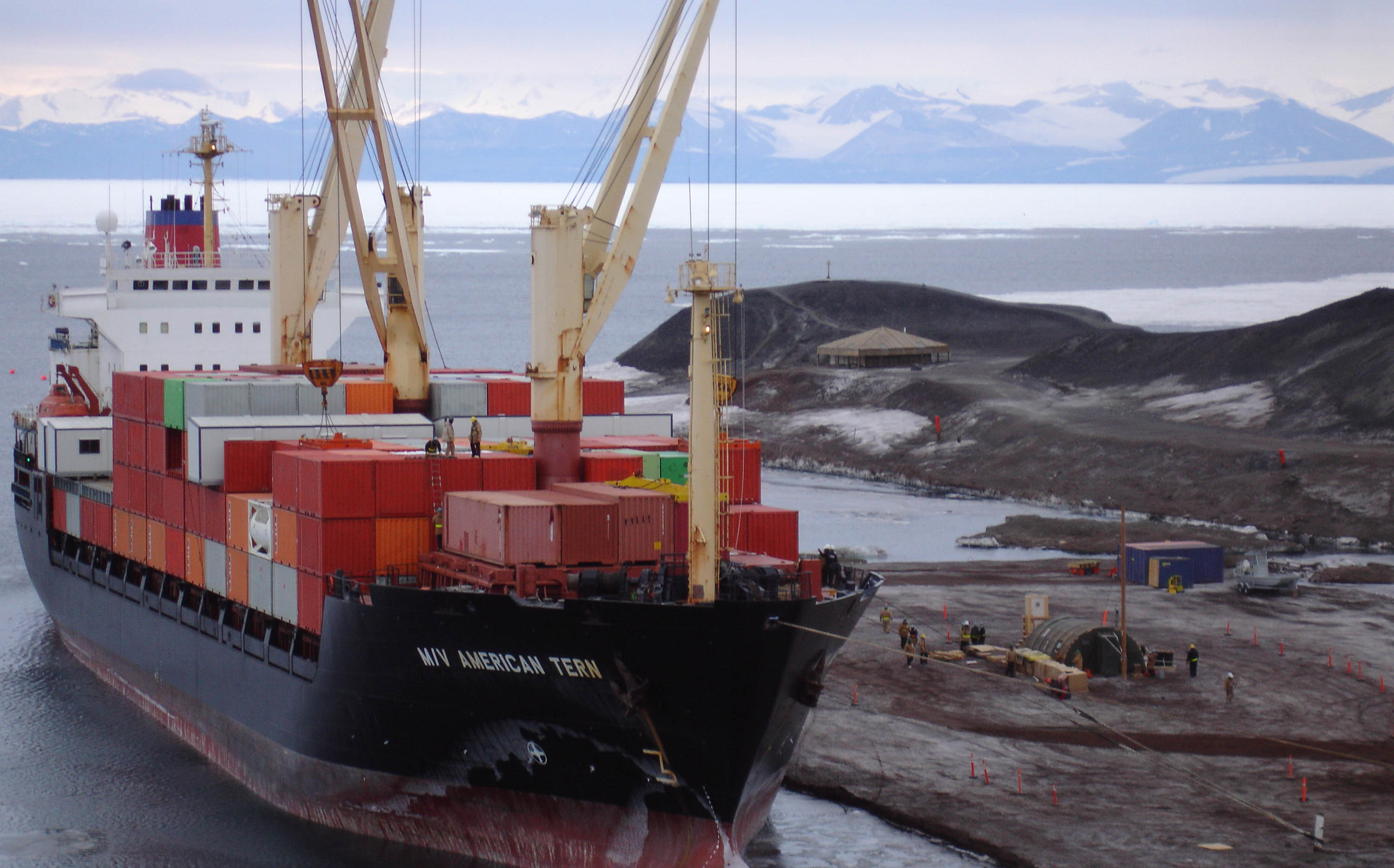
American Tern unloading containers at McMurdo Station

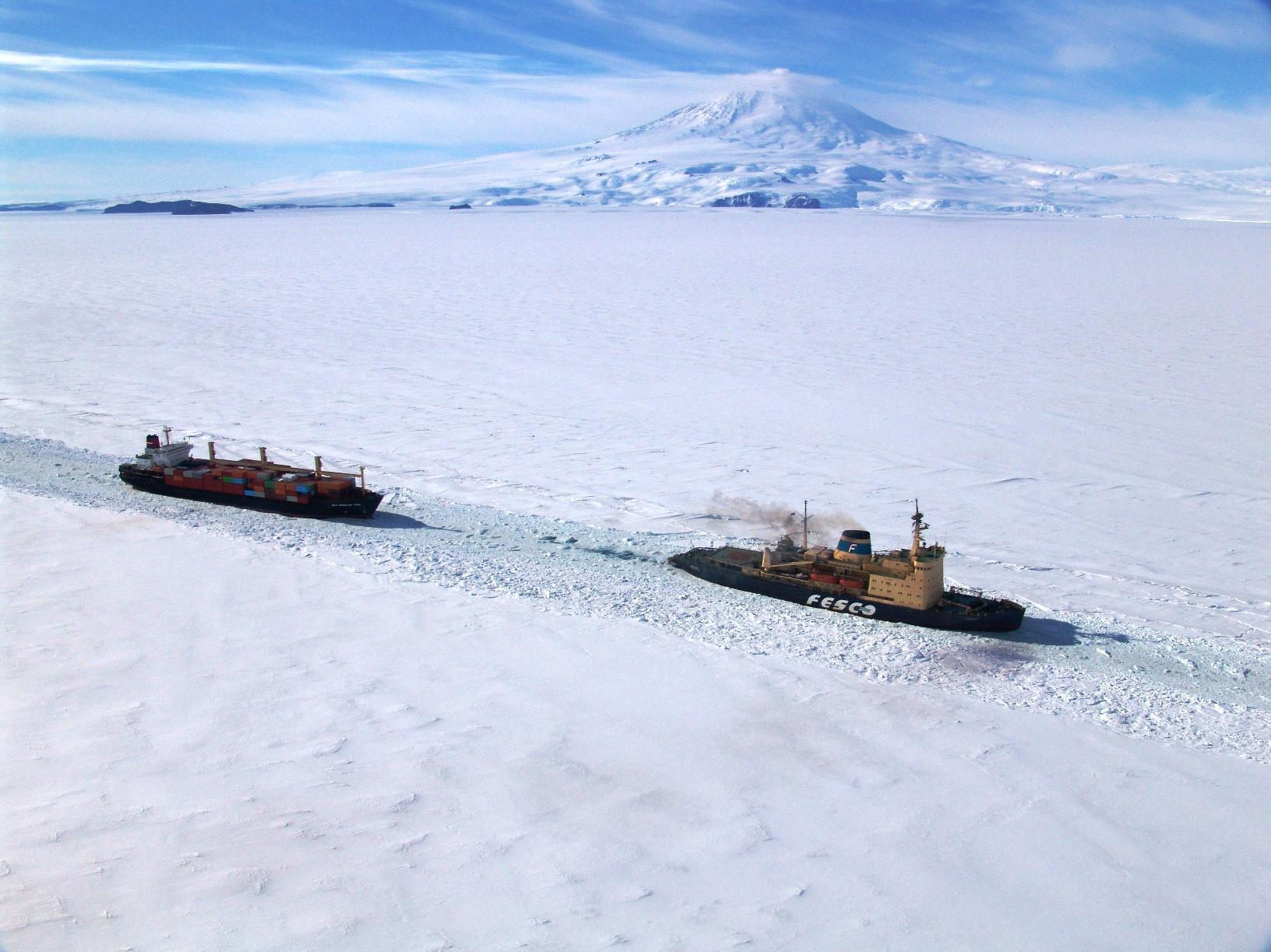
American Tern being led into McMurdo Station, Antarctica, by the Russian icebreaker Krasin during Operation Deepfreeze, 2006

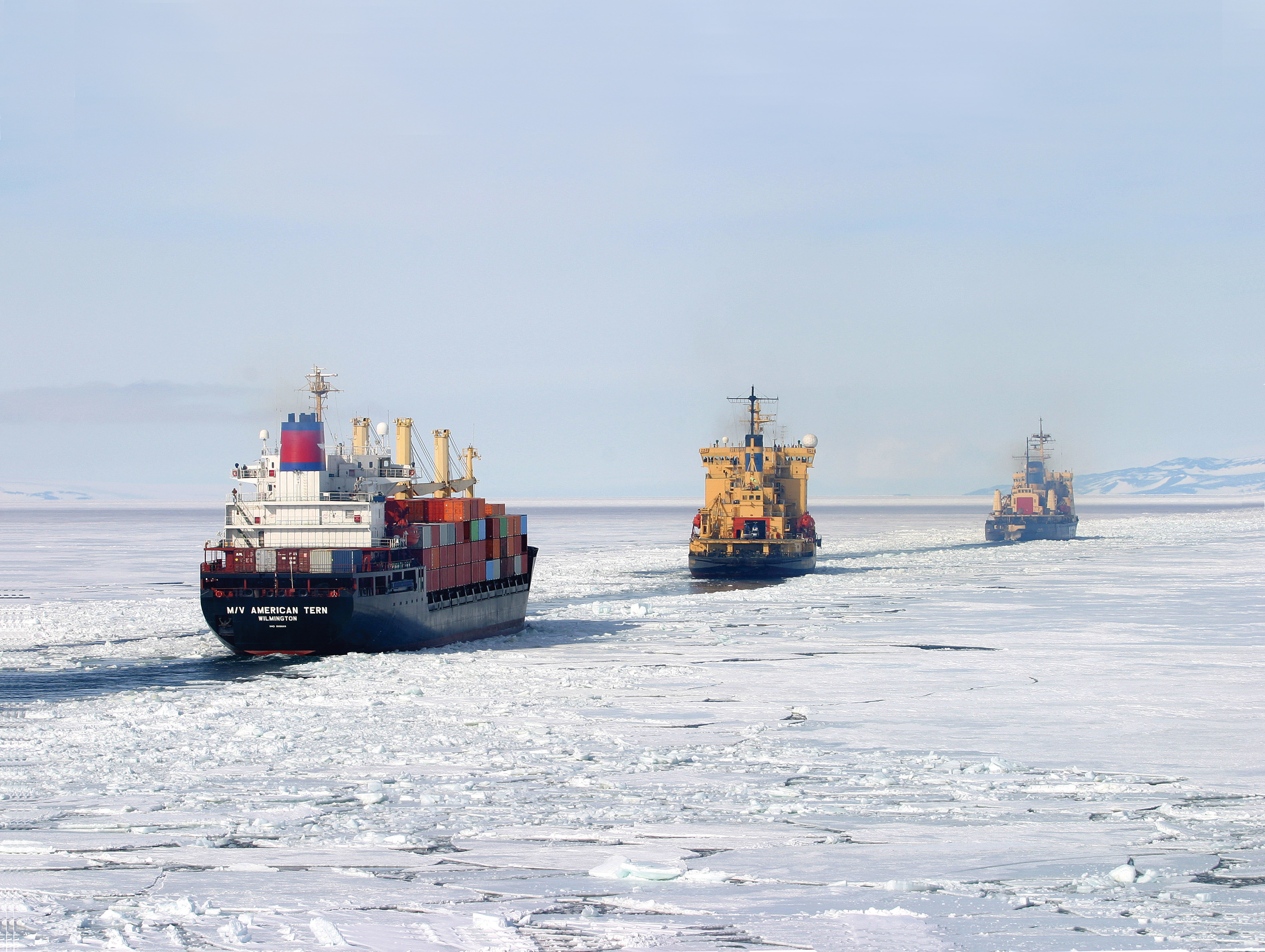
American Tern and Russian icebreakers
