= Paton Peak =

Highest point on Beaufort Island, Antarctica

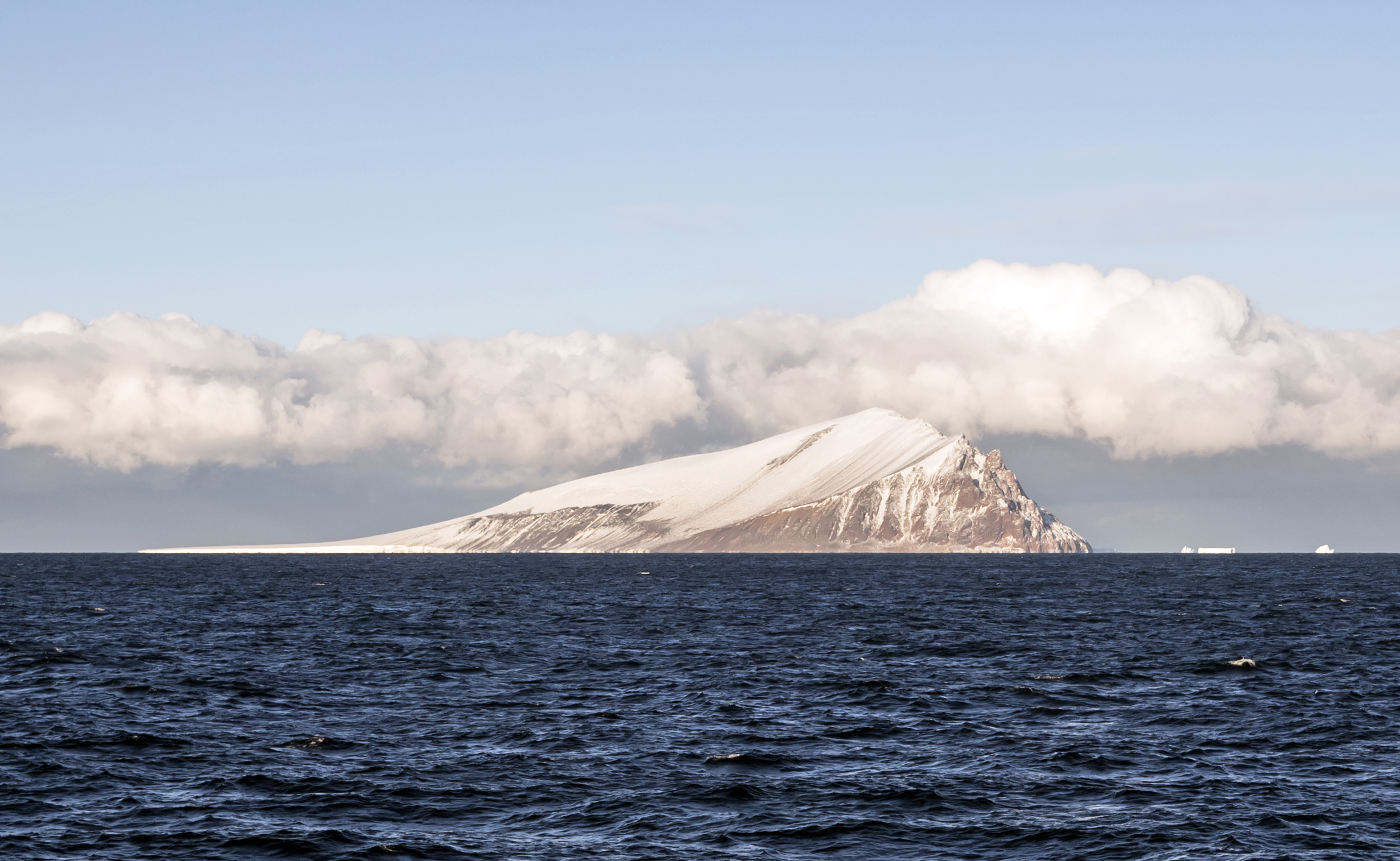
Beaufort Island. Ross Sea, Antarctica. 5 February 2014

Paton Peak (76°57′S 166°57′E) is the highest point, at 740 m, on Beaufort Island, in the Ross Archipelago. Named by the New Zealand Geological Survey Antarctic Expedition (NZGSAE) (1958–59) for James Paton, a seaman who made at least six voyages to the Ross Sea area. He first served on the Morning, relief ship of the Discovery expedition (1901–04), and made the first landing on the island by walking to it against orders, over sea ice from the ship.
