= Lettau =

Lettau may refer to:

- Lettau (surname), including a list of people with the name
- Lettau Peak, Victoria Land, Antarctica
- Lettau Bluff, Ross Dependency, Antarctica
