= North-west White Island Antarctic Specially Protected Area =

Coordinates: 78°03′S 167°20′E

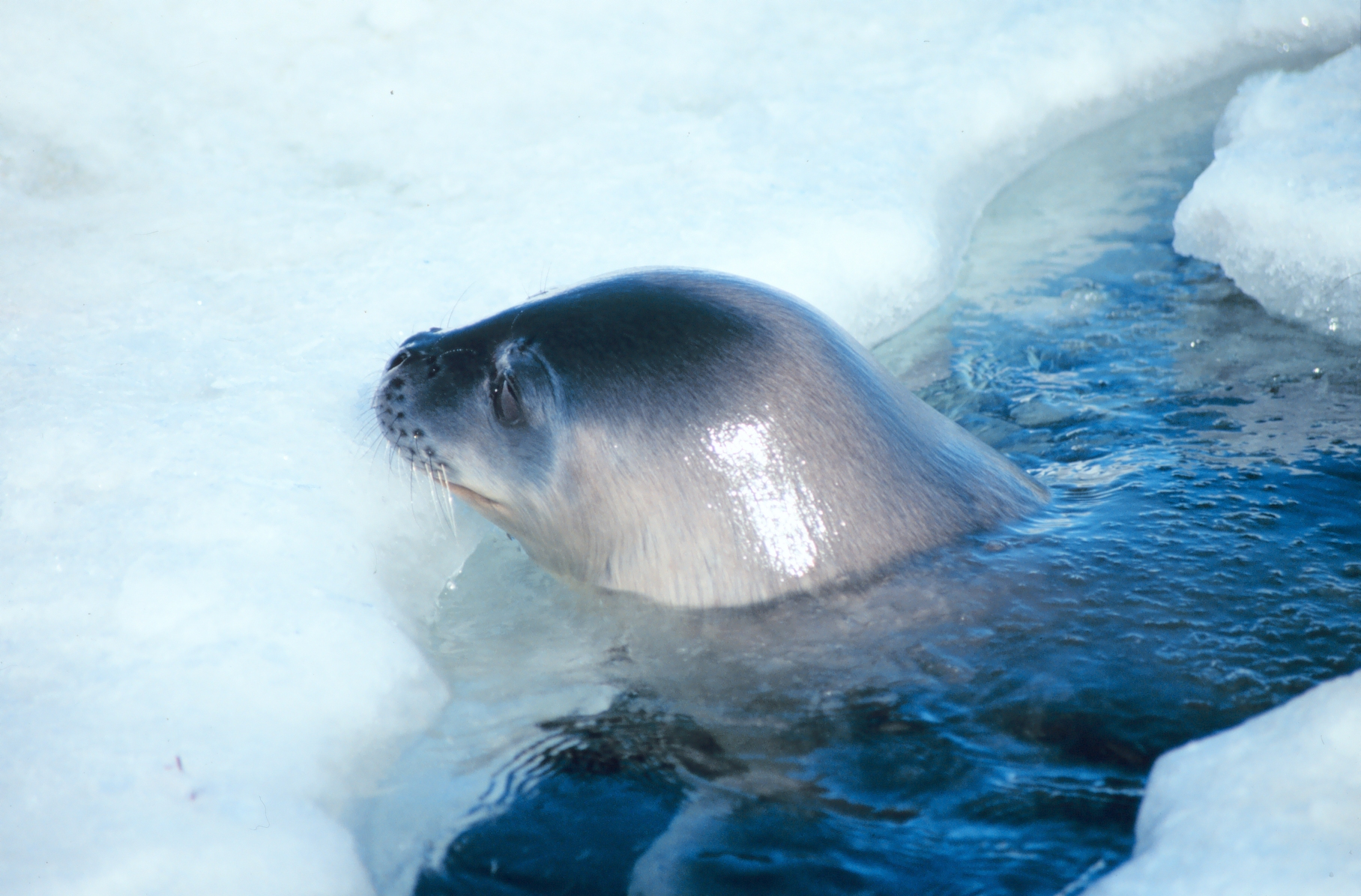
Weddell seal

The North-west White Island Antarctic Specially Protected Area comprises a 142 km^{2} area of coastal shelf ice on the north-west side of White Island in the Ross Archipelago of Antarctica.The site has been designated an Antarctic Specially Protected Area (ASPA 137) because it supports an unusual small breeding population of Weddell seals, which is not only the most southerly known, but which has also been physically isolated from other populations by the advance of the McMurdo and Ross ice shelves. The first seals in the area were recorded in 1958, since when the population has grown to 25–30. The seals use the open waters of McMurdo Sound but do not have the breathing capacity to reach the open ocean by swimming beneath the intervening 20 km of permanent shelf ice.
