= Cole Lake =

Cole Lake may refer to:

- Cole Lake, Ontario, a community in Canada
- Cole Lake (Minnesota), a lake in Carlton County
- Lake Cole, a lake in Antarctica
