= Arnold Heine =

New Zealand explorer

Arnold Heine ONZM QSM
- Born: Arnold John Heine; 4 July 1926; Nelson, New Zealand
- Died: 7 October 2019 (aged 93); Lower Hutt, New Zealand
- Awards: Polar Medal (1969)

Arnold John Heine ONZM QSM (4 July 1926 – 7 October 2019) was a New Zealand glaciologist, mountaineer, tramper and ski-field safety expert.

== Biography ==
Born in Nelson on 4 July 1926, Heine was educated at Nelson College from 1940 to 1943.

Heine participated in many early Antarctic scientific expeditions. His first trip in December 1956 was with the Department of Industrial and Scientific Research during the first IGY year. He spent the winter of 1958 at Scott Base and so began a familiarisation period.

He was a field assistant on the 1957–58 Tucker Glacier Expedition and on the 1958–59 Wood Bay Expedition. These are major features along the Northern Victoria Land Coast.

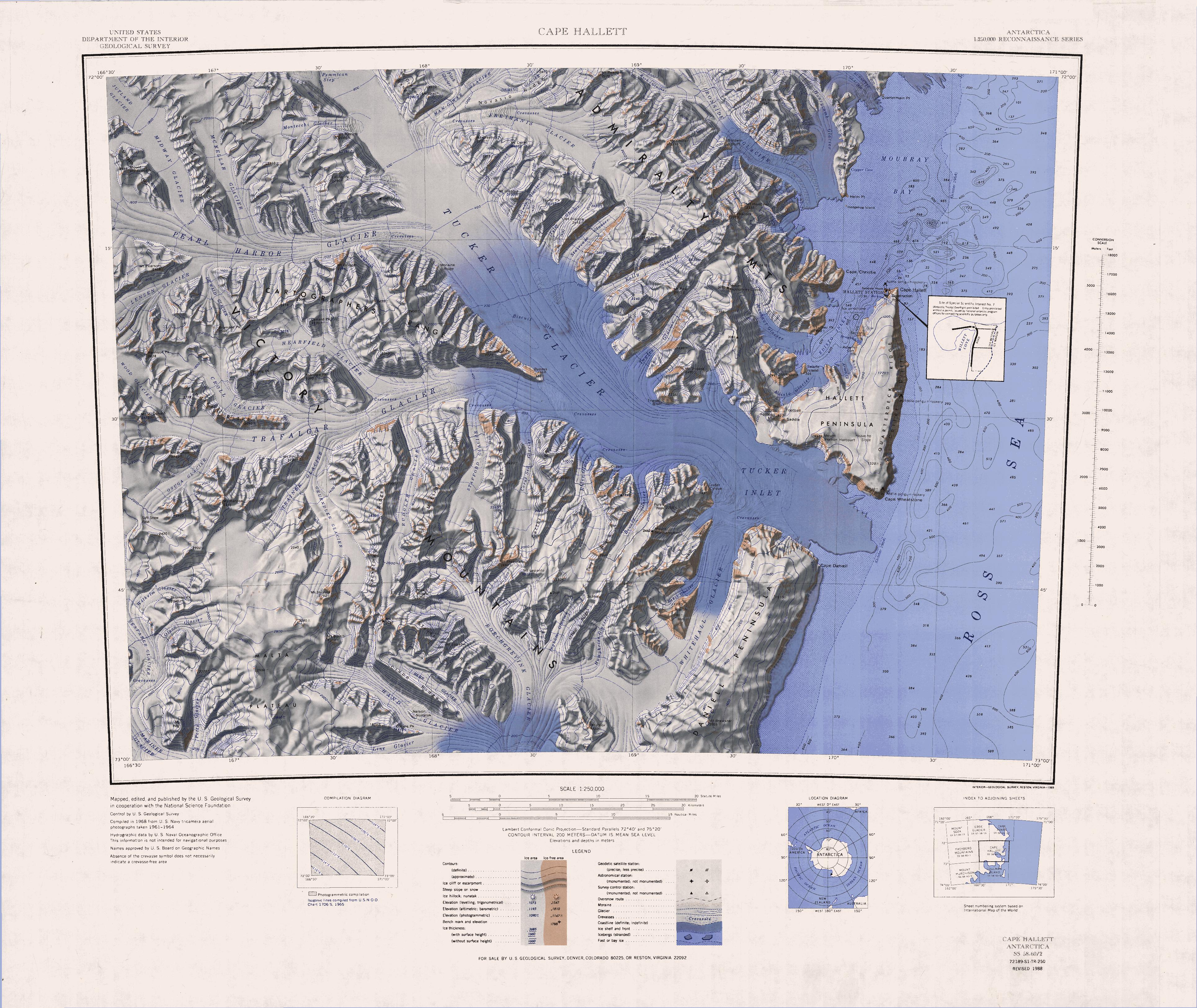
Tucker Glacier near Cape Hallett

He joined the Antarctic Division of the Department of Scientific and Industrial Research in 1962 as Field Officer.

He produced a number of studies on technical aspects of working in Antarctica as well as sea ice.

He was present during Hubert Wilkins final trip to Antarctica.

He was a member of New Zealand Geological Survey Antarctic Expedition during the 1962–1963 season.

When considering the early polar expeditions he said the following. "Looking back at my own field experience in Antarctica, I shudder to think of the consequences of taking south, as Scott did, a collection of men with no mountaineering experience and little familiarity with living in a cold and sometimes hostile mountain environment"

He was the secretary of the NZ Advisory Committee of the Trans-Antarctic Association for nearly 50 years. In 2018, he funded the Arnold Heine Antarctic Research Award at Victoria University of Wellington.

He was married to Janice Heine (1940–2021), a soil scientist. She too had worked in Antarctica over a number of field seasons. Both he and Janice (Jan) were avid trampers (hikers) and he is better known in N.Z. for his contributions to this activity.

Heine died in the Lower Hutt suburb of Woburn on 7 October 2019, at the age of 95.

== Honours and awards ==
In the 1969 Special Honours, Heine was awarded the Polar Medal, for distinguished services in scientific research and exploration as a member of New Zealand expeditions to Antarctica. He received the Queen's Service Medal, for services to the community, in the 1987 New Year Honours. In the 2004 Queen's Birthday Honours, he was appointed an Officer of the New Zealand Order of Merit, for services to outdoor recreation.

Heine was elected a life member of the New Zealand Antarctic Society in 2006. He was also a life member of the Hutt Valley Tramping Club.

Mount Heine, on White Island in the Ross Archipelago, is named in Heine's honour.
