= Mount Discovery =

Volcano in Victoria Land, Antarctica

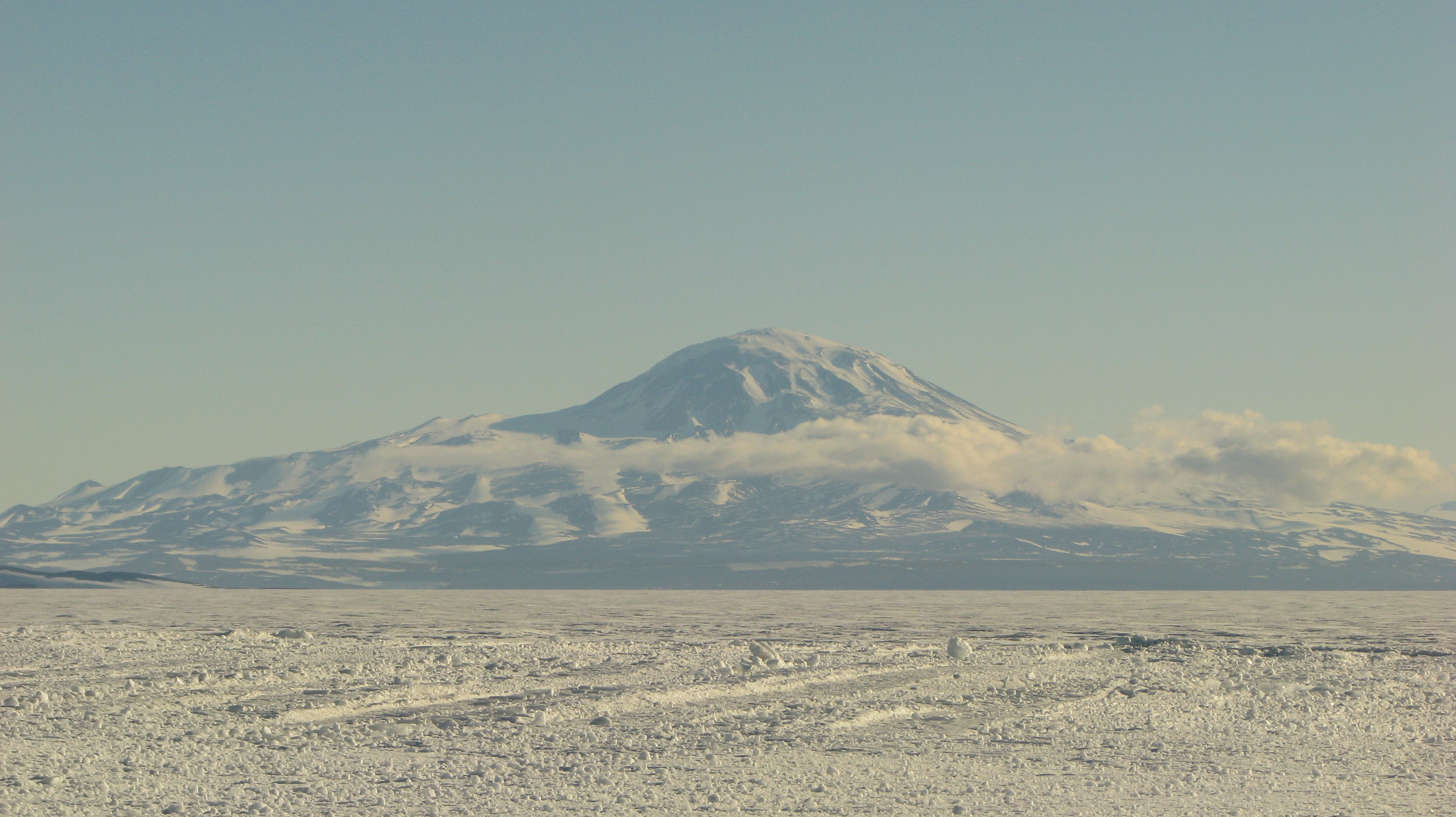
- Mt. Discovery seen from Pegasus Field, January 2013

Highest point
- Elevation: 2,681 m (8,796 ft)
- Prominence: 1,637 m (5,371 ft)
- Listing: Ultra, Ribu
- Coordinates: 78°22′S 165°01′E

Geography
- Location within Antarctica
- Location: Antarctica

Geology
- Rock age: Pliocene-to-Pleistocene
- Mountain type: Stratovolcano
- Volcanic belt: McMurdo Volcanic Group
- Last eruption: 1.87 million years ago

Mount Discovery (78°22′S 165°01′E) is a conspicuous, isolated volcanic cone, 2,680 metres (8,790 ft) high, lying at the head of McMurdo Sound and east of Koettlitz Glacier, overlooking the northwest portion of the Ross Ice Shelf. It forms the center of a three-armed mass of which Brown Peninsula is one extension to the north; Minna Bluff is a second to the east; the third is Mount Morning to the west. Mount Discovery was discovered by the British National Antarctic Expedition (1901–04) and named for their expedition ship Discovery.

== Location ==
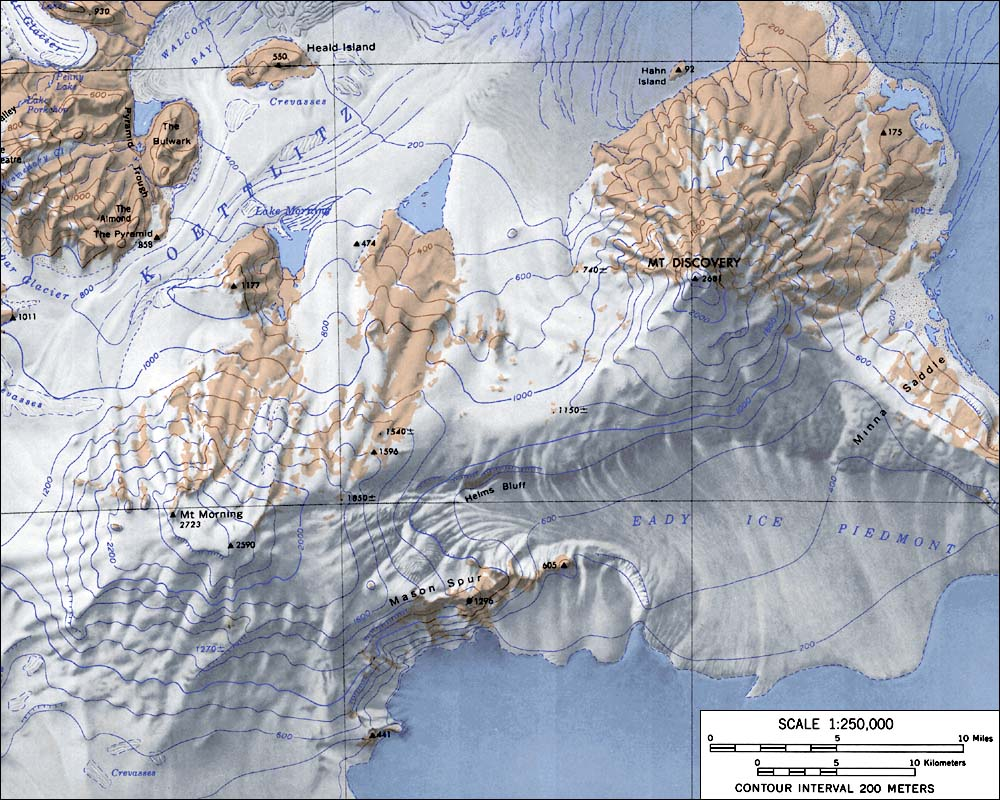
Mount Discovery region

Mount Discovery lies to the southeast of the lower Koettlitz Glacier. The Brown Peninsula extends to the northeast of the mountain between the Koettlitz Glacier and the Ross Ice Shelf. Black Island and White Island rise from the ice shelf to the northeast of the mountain. Minna Bluff, a long peninsula, extends from the southeast of the mountain. The Eady Ice Piedmont is to the south of the mountain. A ridge extends southwest from Mount Discovery to Mount Morning.

== Features ==
Features and nearby features include Mount Morning, and Helms Bluff.

=== Mount Morning ===
78°31′S 163°35′E. Dome-shaped mountain, 2,725 metres (8,940 ft) high, standing west-southwest of Mount Discovery and east of Koettlitz Glacier. Discovered by the BrNAE (1901–04) which named it for the Morning, relief ship to the expedition.

=== Helms Bluff ===
78°29′S 164°25′E. A prominent north-facing bluff 10 nautical miles (19 km; 12 mi) east of Mount Morning. Mapped by USGS from ground surveys and Navy air photos. Named by US-ACAN in 1963 for Lieutenant Commander Louis L. Helms, United States Navy, officer in charge of the Squadron VX-6 winteringover detachment at McMurdo Station, 1961.

=== Discovery Glacier ===
78.3333333°S 164.5°E A broad glacier, 9 nautical miles (17 km; 10 mi) long, between Hurricane Ridge (Antarctica) and Mount Discovery. The glacier flows north to coalesce with the east margin of lower Koettlitz Glacier. Named by Advisory Committee on Antarctic Names (US-ACAN) (1999) in association with Mount Discovery, which Captain Robert Scott had named after the expedition ship of the British National Antarctic Expedition (BrNAE), 1901–04.

=== Lake Discovery ===
78.3333333°S 164.25°E A lake, 3 nautical miles (5.6 km; 3.5 mi) long, situated at the north end of Hurricane Ridge on the west margin of Discovery Glacier. Named by Advisory Committee on Antarctic Names (US-ACAN) (1999) in association with Discovery Glacier, a partial source for the lake, and Mount Discovery, the dominant feature in the vicinity.

== See also ==
- List of volcanoes in Antarctica
- List of Ultras of Antarctica

== Sources ==
- Alberts, Fred G., ed. (1995), Geographic Names of the Antarctic (PDF) (2 ed.), United States Board on Geographic Names This article incorporates public domain material from websites or documents of the United States Board on Geographic Names.
- "Discovery Glacier", Geographic Names Information System, United States Geological Survey, United States Department of the Interior
- "Lake Discovery", Geographic Names Information System, United States Geological Survey, United States Department of the Interior
- Mount Discovery, USGS: United States Geological Survey

This article incorporates public domain material from websites or documents of the United States Geological Survey.
