= James Le Jeune =

James Le Jeune RHA
- self portrait
- Born: James George Le Jeune; 24 May 1910; Saskatoon, Saskatchewan, Canada
- Died: 29 January 1983 (aged 72); Blackrock, Ireland
- Alma mater: Central London Polytechnic
- Known for: Portraits

James Le Jeune RHA (24 May 1910 – 29 January 1983) was an Irish-Canadian artist who painted portraits, landscapes, and seascapes.

== Early life ==
James George Le Jeune was born in Saskatoon, Saskatchewan on 24 May 1910. He was the son of Anthony Le Jeune, a musician of English and French descent, and Agnes Tidmarsh from Galway, with his paternal grandmother Elizabeth Mahony from Killarney Ireland. His great uncle was the English Victorian painter Henry Le Jeune an Associate of the Royal Academy of Arts. Le Jeune was the youngest of five siblings, three boys and two girls.

When he was two, his family moved to St. Brieuc in Brittany where he attended a Christian Brothers School. He continued his education in a boarding school in Northampton, England.

== Career ==
In the early 1930s, Le Jeune began training in art in Paris and later in London at Heatherley School of Fine Art and the Byam Shaw School of Art. He moved to the United States and attended the Art Students League in New York. Le Jeune also studied architecture at the Central London Polytechnic under Sir Giles Gilbert Scott for three years.

When World War II broke out, Le Jeune served in the British Army in Africa and Italy. Following the end of the war, he worked as an architect, but he had not lost his interest in painting. In 1948 Le Jeune showed with the New English Art Club at Bank Field Museum alongside R O Dunlop and John Anderson. He also exhibited at the Royal Institute of Oil Painters, Fisherman's Regatta at the Society of Marine Artists, where he was one of just 40 members.

In 1950, Le Jeune and his wife Pamela (née Mocatta) moved to Delgany in County Wicklow where he designed and built his own home. He briefly practised as an architect but gave this up to paint full-time. The Le Jeunes had three daughters, one of whom went on to be a self-taught artist. He also showed at the Royal Scottish Academy annual exhibition in 1950.

In 1951, aged 41, Le Jeune began exhibiting at The Royal Hibernian Academy and was a regular exhibitor there for the next 31 years until 1982. Le Jeune also exhibited two paintings in the Irish Exhibition of Living Art in 1951. In 1953 Le Jeune showed several paintings at the Royal Watercolour Society in London where the Guardian's art critic noted,

"The mantle of the late William Walcot seems to have descended on James Le Jeune who depicts Piccadilly and York Minster with much the same slashing brush strokes and at least an equal ability to organise an apparent chaos into three-dimensional buildings."

In 1955 Le Jeune exhibited with the Society of Dublin Painters and with the Water Colour Society of Ireland for the first time. He returned to the Dublin Painters in 1956, and exhibited with the Water Colour Society of Ireland twice more, in 1956 and 1959. He showed works in the Oireachtas Exhibitions of 1961 and 1963.

His first one-man show was at Dublin's Victor Waddington Galleries in 1954, which consisted of a number of street scenes from London and Dublin, along with paintings from his foreign travels, Algiers and Palmero. He also presented one watercolour painting Perugia, at the Royal Academy of Arts 186th summer exhibition in 1954.

In 1956 he had an exhibition in the Little Theatre, Brown Thomas. Commenting on his Brown Thomas exhibit, The Dublin Magazine noted:

"This artist's palette in landscape is inclined to be over-sombre; in his portraits on the other hand, his low tones give depth and background, and his subjects are almost startling in their truth and reality – seen with a touch of humour which stops short of caricature."

Le Jeune returned to the same venue for a solo exhibition in the following year, when the art critic for the Dublin Evening Mail proclaimed that the exhibition "establishes this artist as one of the finest portrait painters in this country." He held a further one-man show at the Brown Thomas Gallery in 1959 when his address was listed as care of the Rowley Gallery.

In 1960 Le Jeune moved to a new studio at 38 Baggot Lane in Dublin, Ireland, where he lived and worked until his death in 1983. Between 1964 and 1969 Le Jeune opened and maintained a studio in New York City and divided his time between the two cities. Jimmy, as he was known locally, was a regular visitor at Searsons pub and The Waterloo on Baggot Street. A year after he opened his Dublin studio, Le Jeune was appointed an associate of the Royal Hibernian Academy (RHA). From 1961 to 1972, he exhibited as a member before becoming a full RHA member in 1973.

== Death and legacy ==
Le Jeune died in Blackrock, County Dublin on 29 January 1983, after suffering a heart attack a month earlier. He was survived by three daughters. Le Jeune was buried in Kilquade, County Wicklow. Writing for the Irish Independent twenty-five years later in 2008, journalist Con Houlihan, commented on his friend,

"James was what you might call a painters' painter: he was greatly respected by his fellows but not as well known to the public. He had the invaluable gift of being able to laugh at himself. He was a brilliant catcher in the wry."

Examples of his work can be found in Newport Art Gallery, The National Gallery of Ireland, The National Self Portrait Collection of Ireland, The Abbey Theatre, Crawford Municipal Art Gallery, McKee Barracks, Kings Inns, and The United Arts Club.

== Selected works ==
In March 1996, Le Jeune's Children Playing on a Beach painting sold for £8,700. In October of that same year, Le Jeune's Children Paddling Near Dalkey painting sold for £3,100 and his The Final/ Furlong painting sold for £2,450. Two months later, his Children Playing in a Garden painting sold for £8,000 and his Children on a Beach painting went for £6,200.

In December 2003, Le Jeune's At The Races – Longchamps painting sold for €12,000. In 2008, his the Perfect Storm – Waves Off Brittainy Coast sold for US$51,764.
