= McMurdo Ice Shelf =

Ice shelf in Antarctica

Coordinates: 78°S 167°E

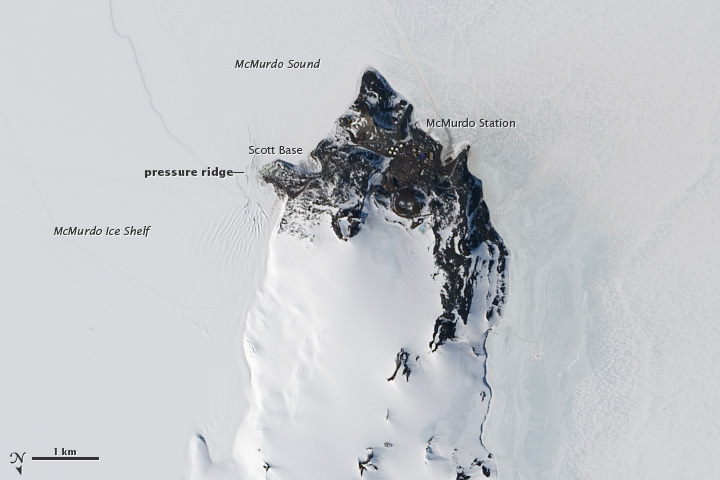
Annotated view of the area near Scott Base and McMurdo Station

The McMurdo Ice Shelf is the portion of the Ross Ice Shelf bounded by McMurdo Sound and Ross Island on the north and Minna Bluff on the south. Studies show this feature has characteristics quite distinct from the Ross Ice Shelf and merits individual naming. A.J. Heine, who made investigations in 1962–63, suggested the name for the ice shelf bounded by Ross Island, Brown Peninsula, Black Island and White Island. The Advisory Committee on Antarctic Names has extended the application of this name to include the contiguous ice shelf southward to Minna Bluff.

In March 2010, while scientists were taking photographs of the underside of the ice shelf, they discovered a living Lysianassidae amphipod.
