= Thomas Vere Hodgson =

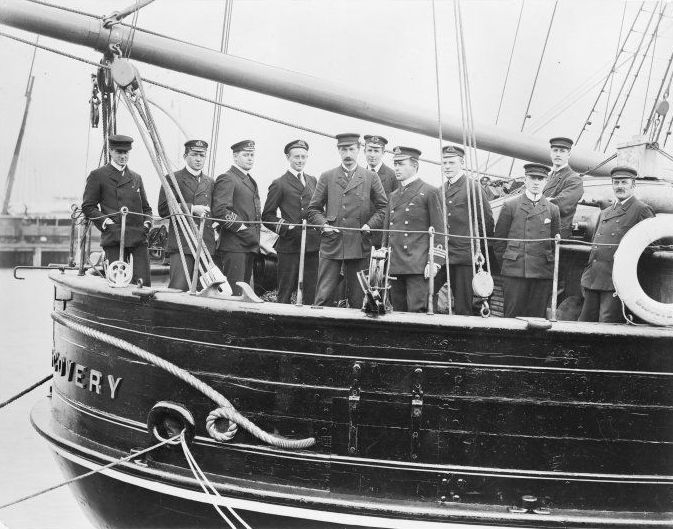
- The members of the Discovery expedition: Thomas Hodgson is on the far right
- Born: 1864
- Died: 1926 (aged 61–62)

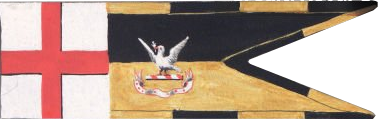
Sledge flag used by Hodgson in Antarctica during the Discovery Expedition.

Thomas Vere Hodgson (1864–1926) was a biologist aboard RRS. Discovery during the Discovery Expedition of 1901–1904, known by the nickname Muggins. He pursued his interest in marine biology initially in his spare time, but eventually found work at the Marine Biological Association in Plymouth. He worked on the collections from the Southern Cross Expedition, before joining the Discovery expedition as one of its oldest members, at 37. The post of naturalist had previously been offered to William Speirs Bruce, who declined, preferring to travel on the Scottish National Antarctic Expedition. Hodgson's work on the Discovery provided the first descriptions of deep sea floor communities in the Antarctic.

Hodgson was reappointed curator of the Plymouth Museum on his return and went on to study the collections from the Scottish National Antarctic Expedition of 1902–1904. He died in May 1926.

The National Marine Biological Library at the Marine Biological Association holds some of Hodgson's scientific notes in the MBA Archive Collection.

Cape Hodgson, the northernmost point of Black Island in the Ross Archipelago is named after Thomas Hodgson.

Hodgson was a fellow of the Anthropological Institute.

The well-known World War Two diarist Vere Hodgson was his niece and was named after him.
