= Vere Hodgson =

British diarist

Winifred Vere Hodgson (1901–1979) kept a lifelong journal starting in her childhood. She is best known for the entries she wrote in the years of World War Two, which she edited in 1976 and published as, Few Eggs and No Oranges: A Diary Showing How Unimportant People in London and Birmingham Lived through the War Years 1940-45. Her detailed 600-page record of life on the home front, from the point of view of an average Londoner, was reprinted by Persephone Books in 1999 and is appreciated by social historians.

== Life, education and work ==
Winifred Vere Hodgson was born in Edgbaston, Birmingham. Her mother was a widow and ran a boarding house in the family home. She was named after an uncle, Thomas Vere Hodgson, who worked as a marine biologist on H.M.S. Discovery during Captain Scott's expedition of 1901–1904. She studied history at Birmingham University and became a teacher at the Poggio Imperiale, the former Summer Palace of the grand dukes of Tuscany. Later she taught at a school in Folkestone. In the early 1930s she lived in Notting Hill Gate and, as well as fire watching, was a staff member in the local charity, The Sanctuary. After retiring, she lived in the village of Church Stretton in Shropshire, where she died in 1979.

== The diaries ==
Typed on airmail paper initially, Hodgson wrote entries and sent them to her cousin Lucy in what was then Rhodesia. The diary entries recorded international, national, local and personal events in what has been described as an unflappable and inspiring manner.

The diaries have often been quoted from, used to corroborate the dates and times of war time events and are of great value to social historians, describing as they do the ways in which ordinary Londoners coped with the privations of war and the nightly terrors of the blitz. Examples of how the diary entries are used to pinpoint and back up war time events are shown in articles about, for example, the bombing of Arundel Gardens in 1940, and the incendiary bombing of the Rowley Gallery in 1941.

== Quotations ==
'The diaries capture the sense of living through great events and not being overwhelmed by them... they display an extraordinary - though widespread - capacity for not giving way in the face of horrors and difficulties.'

The book has been described as a classic, ‘that still rings vibrant and helpful today... a heartwarming record of one articulate woman's coping with the war.'
