= Few Eggs and No Oranges =

Memoir of WWII

- Title page for Few Eggs and No Oranges (1976)
- Author: Vere Hodgson
- Language: English
- Genre: Memoir
- Publication date: 1976
- Publication place: United Kingdom

Few Eggs and No Oranges, the diary of Vere Hodgson, recounts British life on the home front during the Second World War. It was first published in 1976 by Dennis Dobson and again in 1999 by Persephone Books. Described by the author as "a diary showing how unimportant people in London and Birmingham lived through the war years", the published diaries begin on 25 June 1940, the morning after the first air raid on London.

Vere Hodgson was born in Birmingham in 1901. She read History at Birmingham University and went on to be a teacher. In the early 1930s she helped to run a local charity in Notting Hill Gate. She kept a diary throughout her life and in 1976 edited her 1940-45 diary to create Few Eggs and No Oranges.
