= 1969 Special Honours (New Zealand) =

Awards list for New Zealand

The 1969 Special Honours in New Zealand was a Special Honours List dated 14 November 1969, in which 29 people were awarded the Polar Medal, for distinguished services in scientific research and exploration as members of annual New Zealand expeditions to Antarctica.

== Polar Medal ==
- Albert Leon Burrows – of Christchurch.
- Colin Maxwell Clark – of Wellington.
- Malcolm Roding James Ford – of Lower Hutt.
- James Francis Graveson – of Auckland.
- Hilary John Harrington – of Armidale, New South Wales, Australia.
- Adrian Goodenough Hayter – of Upper Tākaka.
- Arnold John Heine – of Lower Hutt.
- Walter William Herbert – residing in London, England.
- Ronald William Hewson – of Ōkato.
- Peter John Hunt – of Dunedin.
- Brian Maxwell Judd – of Rotorua.
- Geoffrey Alan Munro King – residing in Colorado, United States.
- Arthur George Lewis – residing in Berkshire, England.
- William Raymond Logie – of Invercargill.
- William Robert Lucy – of Timaru.
- David Reginald Cecil Lowe – of Auckland.
- David Graham Massam – residing in Sydney, New South Wales, Australia.
- Garth John Matterson – of Rotorua.
- Peter Miles Otway – of Lower Hutt.
- Michael Maynard Prebble – of Nelson.
- Kevin Patrick Pain – of Christchurch.
- Rutherglen Murray Robb – now deceased.
- Athol Renouf Roberts – of Tawa.
- Kenneth James Salmon – of Marton.
- Brian Philip Sandford – residing in Massachusetts, United States.
- Maurice James Sheehan – of Invercargill.
- Robert Baden Thomson OBE – of Eastbourne.
- Keith Charles Wise – of Dunedin.
- Peter Alexander Yates – of Wellington.
Mike Prebble
