= James Paton (seaman) =

James "Scotty" Paton (1869–1917) was a Scottish seaman who sailed to the Antarctic in several major expeditions between 1902 and 1917.

His first venture was from 1902 to 1904 as a crewman of William Colbeck's SY Morning. This expedition consisted of two voyages and was sent as a relief ship for Robert Falcon Scott's Discovery expedition. During the first voyage the ship was briefly stalled in the ice between Cape Bird and Beaufort Island. Paton took the opportunity to leave ship and jump floes a distance of one mile to 'land' of Beaufort Island, the first man to do so. This accomplishment was received with a reprimand.

In 1907–1909, he was a crew member of Sir Ernest Shackleton's Nimrod expedition during each of Nimrod's two southern voyages. From 1910 to 1913, he was a seaman aboard Captain Scott's Terra Nova during her two voyages between New Zealand and Cape Evans, in support of Scott's ill-fated expedition. In 1914 he joined the Ross Sea party section of Shackleton's Imperial Trans-Antarctic Expedition as boatswain on SY Aurora. He was aboard ship on 7 May 1915 when Aurora was torn from her Cape Evans moorings, drifting in the pack for nine months before limping back to New Zealand. Paton's last Antarctic voyage was with Aurora on the mission to relieve the stranded Ross Sea party in January 1917.

After Aurora's return to New Zealand she was sold, and became a coal carrier. Paton signed on as her boatswain, and was aboard when she left Newcastle, New South Wales, in June 1917, bound for South America. Her fate is uncertain, but in late 1917 or early 1918 she was lost, and Paton was lost with her. An inquiry established that the German raider Wolf was laying mines in Cook Strait and in the Tasman Sea in June and July 1917 and concluded that the Aurora likely ran afoul a mine.

Paton's Antarctic voyages are commemorated by Paton Peak on Beaufort Island in the Ross Sea.
