= Black Island (Ross Archipelago) =

Antarctic island

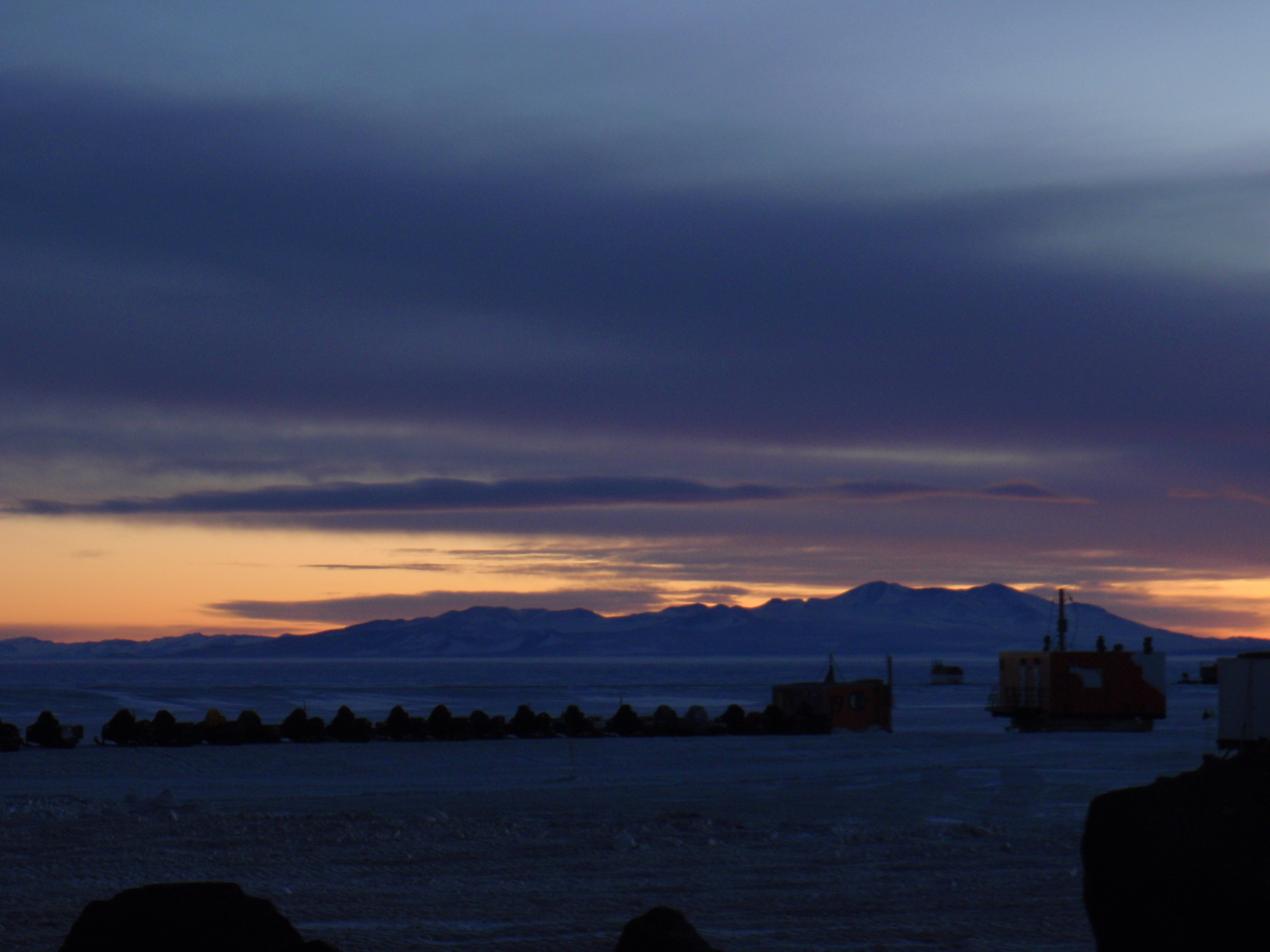
- Black Island and snowmobiles at sunset

- Location within Antarctica

Geography
- Location: Antarctica
- Coordinates: 78°12′S 166°25′E
- Archipelago: Ross Archipelago
- Length: 12 mi (19 km)
- Highest elevation: 1,041 m (3415 ft)

Administration
- Administered under the Antarctic Treaty System

Demographics
- Population: Uninhabited

Black Island (78°12′S 166°25′E) is an island in the Ross Archipelago. It is 12 nautical miles (22 km; 14 mi) long and projects through the Ross Ice Shelf to a height of 1,040 metres (3,410 ft). It was discovered by the British National Antarctic Expedition (Discovery Expedition, 1901–04), which named it for its appearance. The island is largely ice-free and primarily composed of black volcanic rock. The island's northernmost point is named Cape Hodgson, named after Thomas Vere Hodgson, one of the oldest members of the Discovery Expedition.

== Location ==
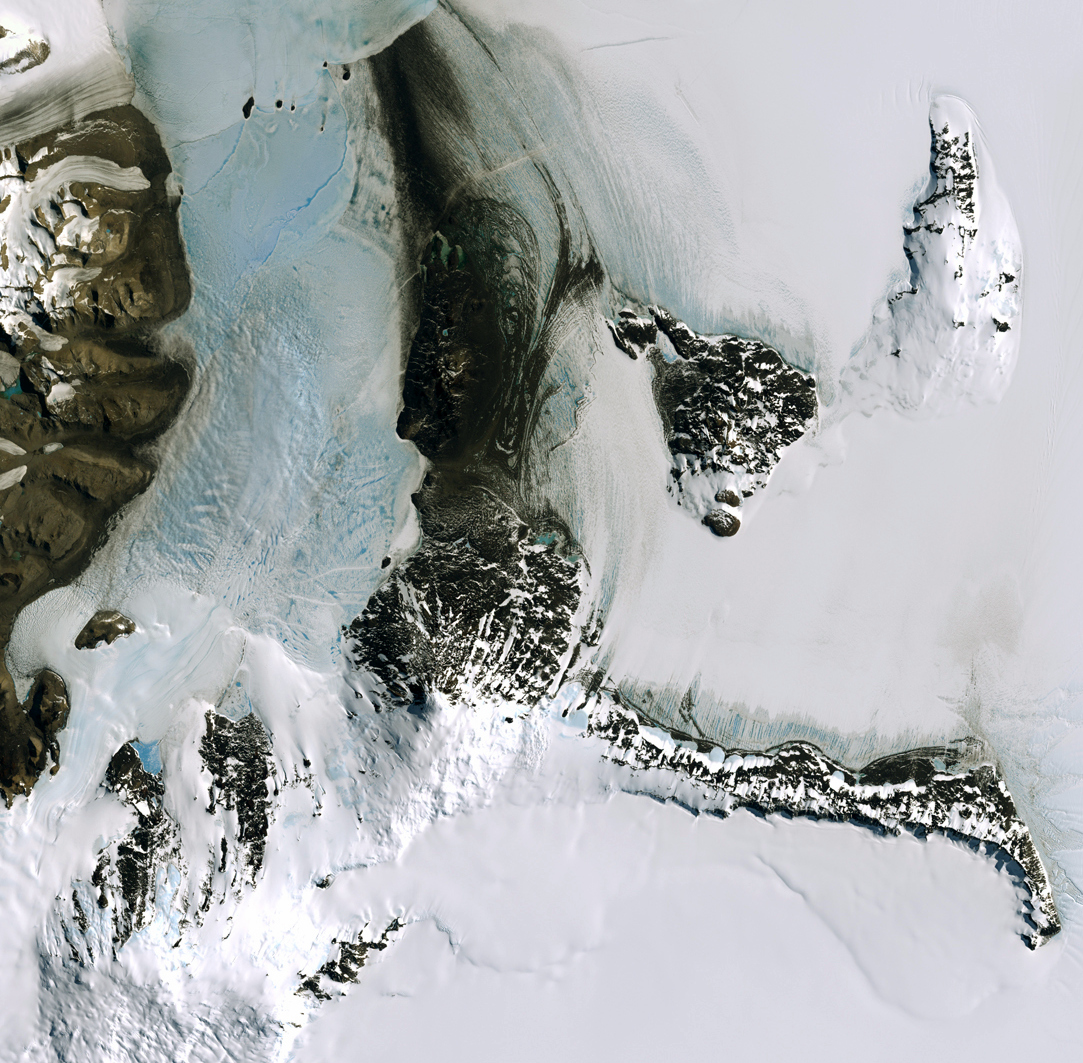
Mount Discovery, Black Island, and White Island; to the south Minna Bluff

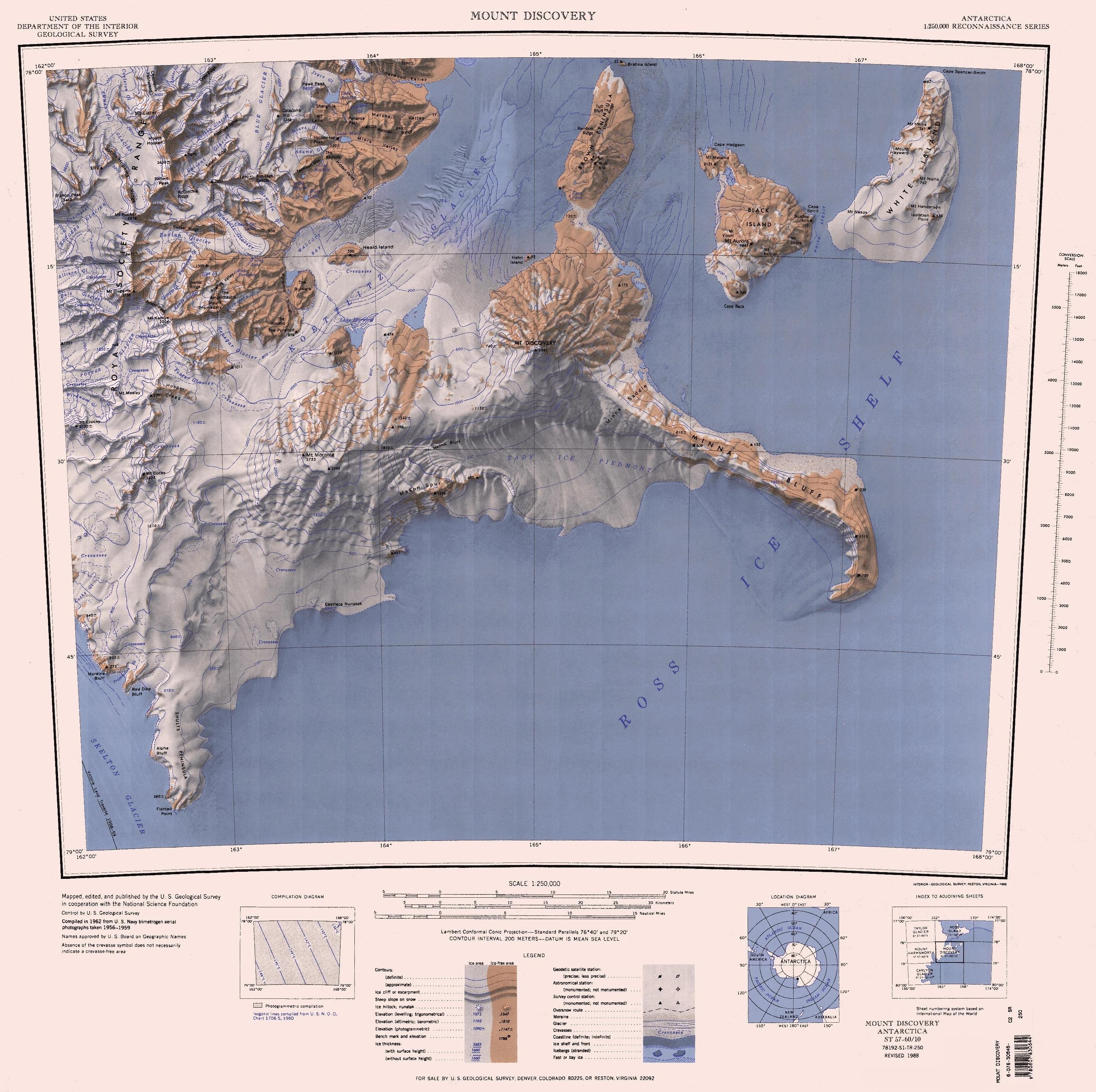
Black Island lies between 166–167°E and 78°00′–78°30′S

Black Island is in the Ross Ice Shelf, to the northeast of Mount Discovery, and southeast of the Brown Peninsula. White Strait runs past the east end of the island, separating it from White Island to the east. Minna Bluff is to the south.

== Geology ==
Black Island is volcanic in origin, consisting of a series of trachytic lava domes and basaltic pyroclastic cones. Potassium–argon dating of the island's volcanic rocks has given ages ranging from 1.69 to 3.8 million years. There are three main geological formations representing three eruptive sequences on the island: Nubian Basalt Formation, Aurora Trachyte Formation, and Melania Basalt Formation. The lack of snow is not due to volcanic activity but rather the fact that it is protected from wind by nearby Minna Bluff.

== Features ==
Features include, from south to north, Cape Beck, Mount Nubian, Mount Aurora, Mount Ochre, Mount Vision, Scallop Hill, Cape Spirit, Mount Melania and Cape Hodgson.

=== White Strait ===
78°13′S 166°48′E. The small ice-filled strait between Black and White Islands. First mapped by the Discovery Expedition. Named by the New Zealand Geological Survey Antarctic Expedition (NZGSAE, 1958–59) for M. White, a member of the party.

=== Cape Beck ===
78°18′S 166°16′E. A rounded, bare rock cape that forms the south end of Black Island. Named by the NZGSAE for A. C. Beck, the leader of the sub-party of the expedition which explored the island. Beck examined the southeast coastline and visited this cape.

=== Mount Estes ===
78.27°S 166.3°E. A flattish mountain 2.5 nautical miles (4.6 km; 2.9 mi) south of Mount Aurora in the southern part of Black Island. The mountain rises to 600 metres (2,000 ft) high and is similar to the flat Cape Beck massif that forms the south end of the island. Named by the United States Advisory Committee on Antarctic Names (US-ACAN, 1999) after Steve A. Estes of the Geophysical Institute, University of Alaska Fairbanks (UAF), who investigated the seismicity of nearby Mount Erebus between 1980 and 1982.

=== Stuckless Glacier ===
78.27°S 166.2°E. A broad glacier in the southwest part of Black Island. It flows southwest between the Rowe Nunataks and Cape Beck to Moraine Strait, McMurdo Ice Shelf. Named by US-ACAN (1999) after John S. Stuckless, Department of Geology, Northern Illinois University (later United States Geological Survey), who in several seasons from 1972–73 investigated the geochemistry of McMurdo volcanic rocks, correlating samples from several Ross Island sites with the Dry Valley Drilling Project(DVDP) core samples obtained in the McMurdo Dry Valleys.

=== Rowe Nunataks ===
78.25°S 166.12°E. A cluster of nunataks 3 nautical miles (5.6 km; 3.5 mi) northwest of Cape Beck in the southwest part of Black Island. Named by US-ACAN (1999) after C. A. Rowe of the UAF Geophysical Institute, who investigated volcanic activity and seismicity at nearby Mount Erebus from 1984–86.

=== Dennis Knoll ===
78.24°S 166.17°E. A gentle knoll that rises to approximately 400 metres (1,300 ft) on the southwest shore of Black Island. The knoll is ice free on the west slope and stands 2 nautical miles (3.7 km; 2.3 mi) southwest of Mount Vision. Named by US-ACAN (2007) after Dennis Hoffman, who in 2006 completed 20 years of service in support of the United States Antarctic Program, spending eight summer seasons and thirteen winters at McMurdo Station. The knoll is near the USAP communication facility on Black Island. The honoree's given name rather than surname was approved to avoid confusion with another nearby feature.

=== Mount Nubian ===
78°15′S 166°25′E. A sharp point of rock at the end of a ridge formed by a lava flow, situated 1 nautical mile (1.9 km; 1.2 mi) southeast of Mount Aurora. The rock forming the mountain is a glossy basalt and appears exceptionally black. Named by the NZGSAE after the ethnic group native to Sudan.

=== Mount Aurora ===
78°14′S 166°21′E. A round-topped volcanic summit, 1,040 metres (3,410 ft) high, the highest point on Black Island. Named by the NZGSAE after the SY Aurora, the vessel which conveyed the Ross Sea party of Shackleton's Imperial Trans-Antarctic Expedition (1914–16) to McMurdo Sound.

=== Mount Ochre ===
78°14′S 166°33′E. A volcanic crater, partly eroded away, lying 3 nautical miles (5.6 km; 3.5 mi) east of Mount Aurora. So named by the NZGSAE because reddish-brown scoria covers much of the upper slopes.

=== Mount Vision ===
78°13′S 166°15′E. A peak in the volcanic complex 1 nautical mile (1.9 km; 1.2 mi) northwest of Mount Aurora. So named by the NZGSAE because of the view obtained of the peaks in this vicinity and of the Ross Archipelago and Minna Bluff area.

=== Jungk Hill ===
78.2°S 166.43°E. A mostly ice-free hill 1.7 nautical miles (3.1 km; 2.0 mi) northeast of Mount Aurora. Named after Robert A. Jungk ^{[]}of ASA (Antarctic Support Associates), engaged in development and expansion of Black Island communication systems for several years beginning in 1989; ASA project engineer for the USAP Unattended Satellite Earth Station which became operational in 1995.

=== Scallop Hill ===
78°12′S 166°44′E. A volcanic dome rising to 225 metres (738 ft) high directly behind Cape Spirit. Named by the NZGSAE after a fossil-bearing conglomerate on top of the hill which contains bivalve specimens.

=== Cape Spirit ===
78°12′S 166°45′E. The easternmost point of Black Island, in the Ross Archipelago; visited by the NZGSAE and so named by them because of the almost constant winds blowing through the strait between Black and White Islands.

=== Vella Flat ===
78.18°S 166.23°E. A coastal flat to the south of Lake Cole in the northwest part of Black Island; named by US-ACAN (1999) after Paul Vella, Department of Geology, Victoria University of Wellington (VUW), who made a reconnaissance survey of Brown Peninsula and Black Island stratigraphy with VUW's Antarctic Expeditions (VUWAE), 1964–65.

=== Melania Ridge ===
78.15°S 166.28°E. A basalt ridge running southeast for 3 nautical miles (5.6 km; 3.5 mi) from Mount Melania. Named by US-ACAN (1999) in association with Mount Melania.

=== Lake Cole ===
78.15°S 166.22°E. An ice-covered lake 1.5 nautical miles (2.8 km; 1.7 mi) long, located south of Mount Ewart and Mount Melania. Named by US-ACAN (1999) after J. W. Cole, Department of Geology, Victoria University of Wellington, who with A. Ewart investigated the geology of Brown Peninsula, Black Island, and Cape Bird in the 1964–65 season.

=== Mount Ewart ===
78.13°S 166.13°E. An ice-free mountain rising to 213 metres (699 ft) high at the northwest side of Lake Cole and 1.5 nautical miles (2.8 km; 1.7 mi) west of Mount Melania. Named by US-ACAN (1999) after A. Ewart of the New Zealand Geological Survey, who with J. W. Cole investigated the geology of Brown Peninsula, Black Island, and Cape Bird in the 1964–65 season.

=== Mount Melania ===
78°07′S 166°08′E. A prominent rounded hill, 330 metres (1,080 ft) high, at the north end of Black Island. It was first climbed by Hartley Ferrar and Louis Bernacchi of the Discovery Expedition. Named by the NZGSAE from a Greek word meaning black. This peak is the location of the USAP's principal earth-based ground station.

=== Cape Hodgson ===
78°07′S 166°05′E. The northernmost cape of Black Island. Named by the NZGSAE for Thomas V. Hodgson, biologist of the Discovery Expedition, who with Reginald Koettlitz, Ferrar and Bernacchi was first to visit the island.

== See also ==
- List of volcanoes in Antarctica
- List of Antarctic islands south of 60° S

== Sources ==
- Alberts, Fred G., ed. (1995), Geographic Names of the Antarctic (PDF) (2 ed.), United States Board on Geographic Names This article incorporates public domain material from websites or documents of the United States Board on Geographic Names.
- "Black Island", www.southpolestation.com, archived from the original on 2019-04-24
- "Dennis Knoll", Geographic Names Information System, United States Geological Survey, United States Department of the Interior
- "Jungk Hill", Geographic Names Information System, United States Geological Survey, United States Department of the Interior
- Kyle, P. R. (1990), "A. McMurdo Volcanic Group Western Ross Embayment", in LeMasurier, W.E.; Thomson, J. W.; Baker, P. E.; Kyle, P. R.; Rowley, P. D.; Smellie, J. L.; Verwoerd, W. J. (eds.), Volcanoes of the Antarctic Plate and Southern Oceans, Antarctic Research Series, vol. 48, Washington, D.C.: American Geophysical Union, pp. 113–116, doi:10.1029/ar048, ISBN 978-0-87590-172-5, archived from the original on 2021-08-02
- "Lake Cole", Geographic Names Information System, United States Geological Survey, United States Department of the Interior
- "Melania Ridge", Geographic Names Information System, United States Geological Survey, United States Department of the Interior
- Mount Discovery, USGS: United States Geological Survey
- "Mount Estes", Geographic Names Information System, United States Geological Survey, United States Department of the Interior
- "Mount Ewart", Geographic Names Information System, United States Geological Survey, United States Department of the Interior
- "Rowe Nunataks", Geographic Names Information System, United States Geological Survey, United States Department of the Interior
- "Stuckless Glacier", Geographic Names Information System, United States Geological Survey, United States Department of the Interior
- "Thomas Vere Hodgson - Biographical notes". Cool Antarctica. Archived from the original on June 14, 2011.
- "Vella Flat", Geographic Names Information System, United States Geological Survey, United States Department of the Interior

This article incorporates public domain material from websites or documents of the United States Geological Survey.
