= Mount Morning =

Volcano in Victoria Land, Antarctica

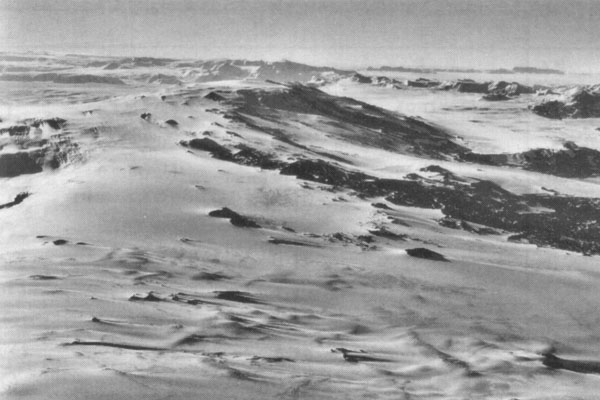
- Aerial view of Mount Morning from the northeast.

Highest point
- Elevation: 2,723 m (8,934 ft)
- Coordinates: 78°30′S 163°30′E

Geography
- Location within Antarctica
- Location: Victoria Land, Antarctica

Geology
- Mountain type: Shield volcano
- Volcanic belt: McMurdo Volcanic Group
- Last eruption: Unknown

Mount Morning is a shield volcano at the foot of the Transantarctic Mountains in Victoria Land, Antarctica. It lies 100 kilometres (62 mi) from Ross Island. Mount Morning rises to an elevation of 2,723 metres (8,934 ft) and is almost entirely mantled with snow and ice. A 4.1-by-4.9-kilometre-wide (2.5 by 3.0 mi) summit caldera lies at the top of the volcano, and several ice-free ridges such as Hurricane Ridge and Riviera Ridge emanate from the summit. A number of parasitic vents mainly in the form of cinder cones dot the mountain.

The volcano was initially active during the Miocene and erupted in two separate stages with a hiatus in between. The older stage has a different chemical composition than the recent one and is heavily eroded by glaciers. The most recent parasitic vents were active about 20,000 years ago, and the volcano could erupt again.

== Geography and geomorphology ==
Mount Morning lies in Victoria Land, about 100 kilometres (62 mi) from Ross Island and at the foot of the Transantarctic Mountains. The Koettlitz Glacier runs along the northwestern foot of Mount Morning and separates it from the Royal Society Range 25 kilometres (16 mi) away. Mount Discovery lies next to Mount Morning and is separated from it by the Discovery Glacier. The volcano was originally described in the early to middle 20th century, before more detailed analyses took place in the 1970s, 1980s, and 2000s. The climate in the area is polar, although parts of the ice melt in the sunshine during summer.

The volcano rises to 2,723 metres (8,934 ft) above sea level and is capped by a 4.1-by-4.9-kilometre-wide (2.5 by 3.0 mi) caldera that may be the source of a glacier at its northeastern end. Mount Morning has been defined as a 30-by-36-kilometre (19 mi × 22 mi) large shield volcano that consists of a central volcano overlying an older volcanic complex. With a volume of 1,785 cubic kilometres (428 cu mi), it is one of the largest volcanoes in the region. Fissure vents have produced at least 185 parasitic vents on the slopes of Mount Morning. They are cinder cones, fissure ridges, lava domes, and volcanic necks, and their diameters range from a few metres to a few hundred metres. Many of the vents form alignments, some cone craters overlap or the vents themselves have linear shapes. These linear patterns define northeast–southwest trends, with a minor northwest–southeast alignment. Lava flows emanate from cones and make up the present-day surface of the volcano.

Mount Morning is almost entirely covered with snow and ice except where it is ablated by southerly winds. Outcrops of volcanic rocks form the north-northeastern Riviera Ridge and northeastern Hurricane Ridge on the northern flank, Mason Spur on the southern flank, and on Helms Bluff on the eastern flank. Gandalf Ridge is a promontory formed by northward-tilted debris and penetrated by dikes. It is located at the foot of Hurricane Ridge, and Pinnacle Valley is located on the Riviera Ridge. Dikes, lava domes, lava flows, and pyroclastic deposits are found in outcrops. Mason Spur also contains breccias from pillow lavas, while Gandalf Ridge features a diamictite and a cross-cutting fault. Mason Spur was considered by Martin et al. 2021 to be a separate volcano from Mount Morning.

Owing to the lack of running water, the main edifice (unlike Mason Spur, where traces of marine and water erosion are present) is uneroded and parasitic vents have a young appearance. Glacial erosion has eroded some parts of the volcano, leaving volcanic necks in Pinnacle Valley, has etched glacial striations into exposed volcanic rocks and deposited glacial till. The Vereyken Glacier descends the northeastern slopes of Mount Morning between Hurricane Ridge and Riviera Ridge. Moraines occur on these two ridges and moraines dating to the Wisconsin glaciation have been reported. Glaciers descending from Mount Morning feed the Koettlitz Glacier. Several lakes are found on the volcano and at its foot, including Lake Morning at the end of the Riviera Ridge and Lake Discovery at the foot of the Hurricane and Gandalf ridges.

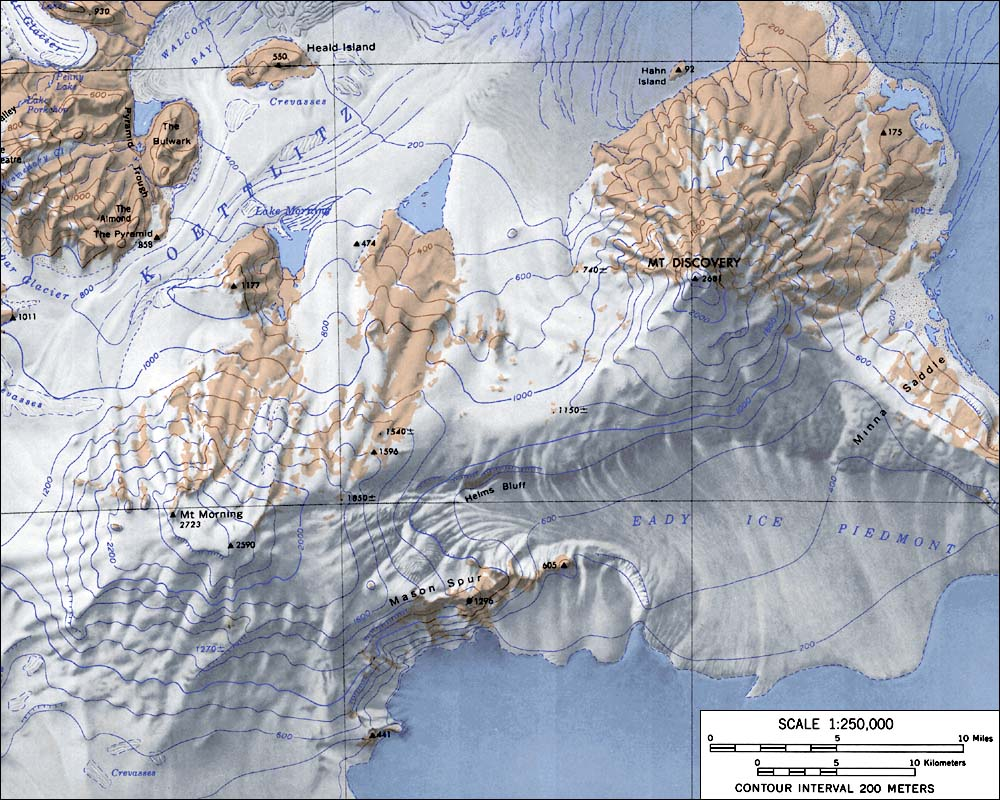
Topographic map of Mounts Morning and Discovery (1:250,000 scale) from USGS Mount Discovery

== Geology ==
The West Antarctic Rift is a major geological feature in Antarctica and one of Earth's largest continental rifts. It is a region of active crustal extension and spreading, which may be ongoing today. Volcanic activity occurs at the rift and includes the McMurdo Volcanic Group, a 2,000-kilometre-long (1,200 mi) chain of volcanoes in Victoria Land. This volcanic group has erupted alkaline lavas during the course of the Cenozoic. It is subdivided into three provinces: the Hallett, the Melbourne, and the Erebus province; Mount Morning is the southernmost volcano of the Erebus province.

Mount Morning rises from a Paleozoic basement, the Koettlitz Group which crops out close to Gandalf Ridge in the form of granite and metasedimentary rocks. Based on rocks erupted by Mount Morning, the crust appears to be thin and has a calc-alkaline composition. Tectonic sutures in this basement may have allowed magma to ascend to the surface in the Mount Morning region.

=== Composition ===
Basanite is the dominant rock of outcrops, with phonolite less common and picrobasalt and tephrite rare. Outcrops of older rocks include mugearite, rhyolite and trachyte. Textures range from porphyritic to seriate. Various phenocrysts are found within the volcanic rocks, including aegirine, augite, clinopyroxene, alkali feldspar, kaersutite, nepheline, olivine, plagioclase, quartz, and sanidine. Aegirine, aenigmatite, amphibole, augite, clinopyroxene, alkali feldspar, glass, iron oxide-titanium oxide, nepheline, plagioclase, and quartz make up the groundmass. The volcanic rocks contain xenoliths consisting of syenite and of rocks from older stages of Mount Morning activity. Spinel, peridotite, and less commonly clinopyroxenite, dunite, harzburgite, lherzolite, norite, pyroxenite, and websterite have been reported as xenoliths.

The early volcanic rocks of Mount Morning are comparable to mildly alkaline rocks from Mount Melbourne, while the more alkaline late volcanic rocks resemble these from Mount Erebus. The older rocks define the "Mason Spurr lineage" while the younger ones are referred to as the "Riviera Ridge lineage". Basaltic rocks are concentrated on the lower slopes, while phonolite is mainly found in the upper sector of Mount Morning. The composition changes between the early and late volcanic activity of Mount Morning may be due to alteration in crustal magma processes.

== Eruption history ==
Mount Morning has been active during the Miocene, Pliocene, and Pleistocene. Argon-argon dating and potassium-argon dating have been used to infer the duration of volcanic activity at Mount Morning. Gandalf Ridge has yielded ages of 18.7±0.3 to 15.5±0.5 million years, Pinnacle Valley 15.2±0.2 to 13.0±0.3 million years, Mason Spur 12.4±0.4 to 11.4±0.2 million years, rocks below the summit of 6.13±0.20 to ~1.00 million years, and 4.51±0.31 to 0.02 million years on other formations. Some of these eruptions may have deposited volcanic ash over the McMurdo Sound area and in the Transantarctic Mountains. Even older activity at Mount Morning may be recorded in volcanic deposits from Cape Roberts, which go back to 24.1 million years ago. This is a long lifespan for a volcano by Antarctic standards, and may be due to tectonic factors that kept magma generation focused on Mount Morning for a long time. Loading by glaciers may have influenced volcanic activity at Mount Morning, and conversely, the growth of Mount Morning and Discovery may have formed substrates for the formation of new glaciers – initially the mountains may not have had much glaciation.

Volcanic activity has been subdivided into two phases separated by a hiatus, an early phase lasting between 11.4±0.2 to 18.7±0.3 million years ago and a late phase from 6.13±0.20 million years ago to almost present-day. These phases are also known as the phase I or the Mason Spur Lineage, and as the phase II or the Riviera Ridge Lineage. The early phase produced mildly alkaline volcanic rocks, the late phase which makes up most of the outcrops strongly alkaline rocks. The early phase has produced ignimbrites from a caldera at Mason Spur, an otherwise-rare type of volcano in Antarctica. The older rocks have undergone significant glaciation, while the younger ones are largely uneroded and make up the present-day edifice. Volcanic activity mostly occurred under the atmosphere, with the exception of some lavas that may have been erupted in a subaqueous environment and hyaloclastites which have been used to infer that glaciers existed there 15.4 million years ago. Volcanic activity was focused along geologic lineaments on Mount Morning, which were reused during more recent eruptions.

Eruptions took place at Mount Morning about 20,000 years ago, forming well-preserved cinder cones. In the 1960s, thermal anomalies were observed at Gandalf Ridge, implying that the volcano may still be active, although ground surveys did not detect fumarolic activity. Thus, Mount Morning was considered dormant by Martin, Cooper, and Dunlap 2010 and might be the source of tephra layers found in the area.

== History and name ==
The volcano was discovered by the Discovery Expedition in 1901–1904 and named after a relief ship that took part in the expedition.

== Features ==
Features, from north to south, include:

=== Gandalf Ridge ===
78.35°S 164.1166667°E

A volcanic ridge at the northwest end of Hurricane Ridge, to the north of Mount Morning on Scott Coast. Gandalf is a whimsical name put forward by geologist Philip R. Kyle, Institute of Polar Studies, The Ohio State University, who examined the ridge in December 1977. The discovery of very hard volcanic rock at this ridge led to the naming: Gandalf is a crusty character (a wizard) in J.R.R. Tolkien's The Lord of the Rings.

=== Hurricane Ridge ===
78°24′S 164°12′E

The eastern of two broad, mainly ice-free ridges that descend north from Mount Morning. Riviera Ridge is the other, to the west, and Gandalf Ridge and Lake Discovery are located at the north end of this ridge. The name was suggested by geologist Anne C. Wright, Department of Geoscience, New Mexico Institute of Mining and Technology, a member of the NMUMT field party that camped on the ridge in the 1985–86 season. The party's tent was blown to shreds by 100-knot (190 km/h; 120 mph) winds, requiring evacuation of the party by helicopter. This ridge is renowned for consistently strong winds. It is juxtaposed with Riviera Ridge, which is similar in appearance to this ridge to the west.

=== Vereyken Glacier ===
78.4166667°S 163.95°E

A glacier which, together with Morning Glacier, drains the northeast slopes of Mount Morning. Vereyken Glacier flows north between Riviera Ridge and Hurricane Ridge into Koettlitz Glacier. Named by US-ACAN (1994) after Jill Vereyken, ASA manager of Field Support Services, McMurdo Station, who was active in coordination and planning of science support in Antarctica from 1984.

=== Riviera Ridge ===
78°24′S 163°42′E

This name has been included as a US-ACAN proposal even though it was apparently applied in about 1977 by Anne Wright (now Grassham) who worked on the ridge with P.M. Kyle. The name alludes to the warm sunny conditions experienced on the ridge in contrast to the storm conditions previously experienced on nearby Hurricane Ridge.

=== Testa Ridge ===
78.45°S 163.5333333°E

A volcanic ridge, 2.7 nautical miles (5.0 km; 3.1 mi), extending north–south between Weidner Ridge and Riviera Ridge on the north slope of Mount Morning. Named by Advisory Committee on Antarctic Names (US-ACAN) (1994) after J. Ward Testa, biologist, University of Minnesota (later of University of Alaska); conducted seal studies during ten field seasons in McMurdo Sound and other coastal regions, 1980–94.

=== Campbell Crag ===
78.4566667°S 163.5444444°E

A rock peak rising to 1,918 metres (6,293 ft) high at the south end of Testa Ridge on the north slope of Mount Morning. Named by US-ACAN (1994) after Richard J. (Rick) Campbell, ASA, fixed-wing Flight Operations Coordinator at McMurdo Station, active in science support in Antarctica from 1981.

=== Weidner Ridge ===
78°27′41.8″S 163°25′52.5″E

A linear volcanic outcrop, approximately 4.1 kilometres (2.5 mi) long, between and parallel to Savage Ridge and Testa Ridge on the north slope of Mount Morning. Named by US-ACAN after George A. Weidner, Department of Meteorology (later Space Science and Engineering Center), University of Wisconsin. Along with Charles Stearns, he developed the use of automatic weather stations in Antarctica in the period 1982–2005.

=== Savage Ridge ===
78°28′52.7″S 163°22′26.5″E

A linear volcanic outcrop approximately 6 kilometres (3.7 mi) long descending from the northwest slope of Mount Morning. Parallel to and about 1 kilometre (0.62 mi) from Weidner Ridge. Named by US-ACAN (1994) after Michael L. Savage, Department of Meteorology, University of Wisconsin. Along with Charles Stearns, he developed the use of automatic weather stations in Antarctica during four field seasons, 1980–86.

=== Morning Glacier ===
78°28′56.5″S 163°45′45.6″E

A glacier on the northeast slope of Mount Morning. The glacier flows from the peak for about 8.5 kilometres (5.3 mi), terminating partway down the mountain, approximately 8 kilometres (5.0 mi) south of Lake Morning, and west of the upper Vereyken Glacier. Named by US-ACAN (1994) in association with Mount Morning.

=== Mason Spur ===
78°33′S 164°25′E

An elevated spur, partially ice-covered and over 1,300 metres (4,300 ft) high, which projects eastward from Mount Morning. Named by US-ACAN in 1963 for Robert Mason, USARP Representative at McMurdo Station, 1962–63.

== See also ==
- List of ultras of Antarctica
