= Brown Peninsula =

Peninsula in Antarctica

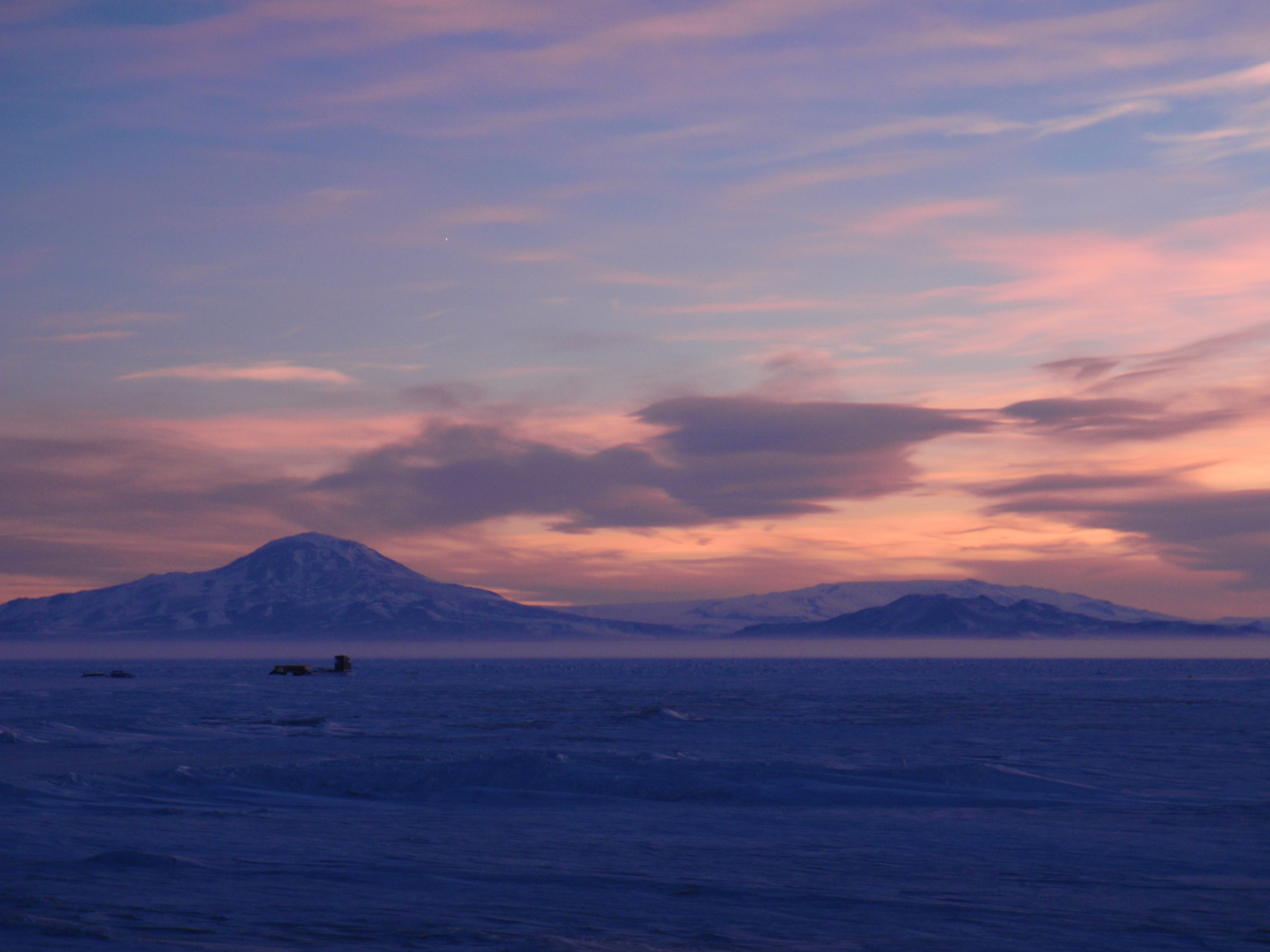
- Mount Discovery and Brown Peninsula

- Location within Antarctica

Geography
- Location: Ross Ice Shelf
- Coordinates: 78°6′S 165°25′E

The Brown Peninsula (78°6′S 165°25′E) is a nearly ice-free peninsula, 10 nautical miles (19 km; 12 mi) long and 4 nautical miles (7.4 km; 4.6 mi) wide, which rises above the Ross Ice Shelf northward of Mount Discovery, to which it is connected by a low isthmus. It was discovered by the British National Antarctic Expedition, 1901–04 (BrNAE), which named it "Brown Island" because of its color and its island-like character. It was named it "Brown Peninsula" by New Zealand Antarctic Place-Names Committee in 1961 after it was described a peninsula.

== Location ==
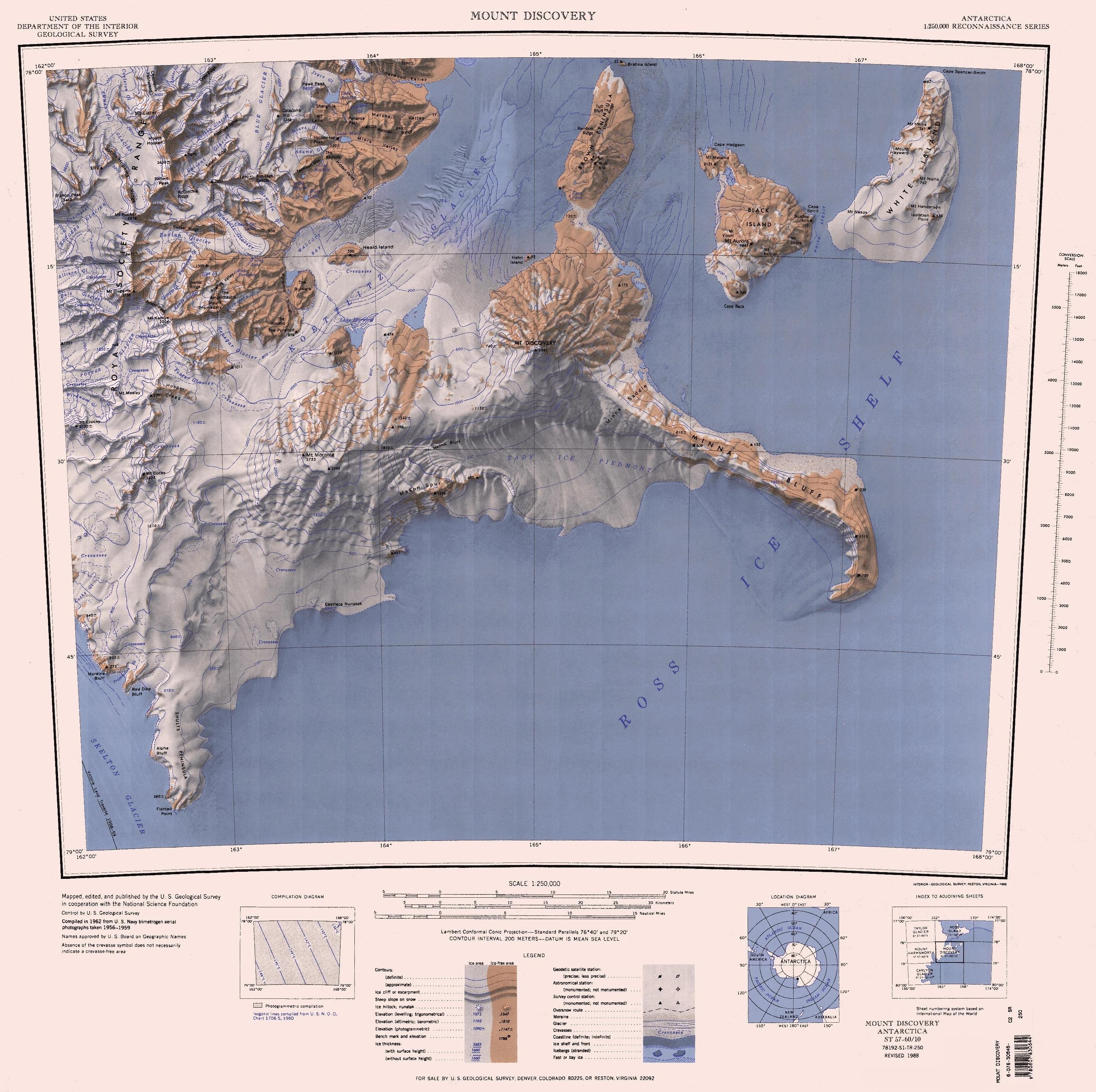
Brown Peninsula in north center of map

Brown Peninsula lies to the north of Mount Discovery, to which it is connected by a narrow isthmus. The Koettlitz Glacier flows along its west coast. The east coast faces the Ross Ice Shelf. Black Island lies to the east of the peninsula.

== Features ==
Features, from south to north, include:

=== Moraine Strait ===
78.2°S 165.8°E. A strait on the McMurdo Ice Shelf that trends north–south between Brown Peninsula, Mount Discovery, and Minna Bluff on the west, and Black Island on the east. The surface of the strait, especially the north part between Brown Peninsula and Black Island, is noteworthy for the presence of broad moraine belts that obscure much of the ice and suggest the name. The strait was discovered by the BrNAE, 1901-04, led by Scott. Named by the United States Advisory Committee on Antarctic Names (US-ACAN) in 1999.

=== Bellafronto Bight ===
78.2166667°S 165.1°E. An ice-filled embayment between the base of the west side of Brown Peninsula and the low northwest foot of Mount Discovery. The bight extends southwest-northeast for 6 nautical miles (11 km; 6.9 mi) from Hahn Island to Swyers Point. Named by US-ACAN (1999) after Lieutenant Robert L. Bellafronto, Civil Engineer Corps, United States Navy, a public works officer at McMurdo Station in United States Navy Operation Deep Freeze 1977 and 1978.

=== Dreary Isthmus ===
78.2°S 165.2833333°E. A low, narrow neck of land, or isthmus, that joins the base of Brown Peninsula and the low morainal area north of Mount Discovery. Named descriptively by US-ACAN (1999) in keeping with the dark and gloomy aspect of the feature.

=== Ebon Pond ===
78°11′S 165°11′E. A pond located in the southwest extremity of Brown Peninsula. First studied on the ground by United States geologist Troy L. Péwé during United States Navy Operation Deep Freeze, 1957-58. So named by him because of the black volcanic terrain which entirely surrounds the pond.

=== Swyers Point ===
78.1666667°S 165.1333333°E. An ice-free point on the west side of Brown Peninsula, Scott Coast, that marks the north extent of Bellafronto Bight. Named by US-ACAN (1999) after Lieutenant Commander H.M. Swyers, United States Navy, a public works officer at McMurdo Station in United States Navy Operation Deep Freeze 1976 and 1977.

=== Mount Wise ===
78°08′S 165°23′E. A bare rock summit, the highest point at 815 metres (2,674 ft) high on Brown Peninsula. Named by A.J. Heine of the McMurdo Ice Shelf Project, 1962-63, for K.C. Wise, a New Zealander who explored the peninsula while a member of the NZGSAE, 1958-59.

=== Rainbow Ridge ===
78°06′S 165°24′E. A small ridge which forms a distinct western rim to the large crater-like depression high in the central part of Brown Peninsula. Given this geologically descriptive name by the New Zealand Antarctic Place-Names Committee (NZ-APC), it arose from investigations by the New Zealand Geological Survey and the Victoria University of Wellington Antarctic Expedition (VUWAE) in 1964-65. The top of the ridge has been planed off by subsequent glaciation and the resultant surface exposes two basalt "pipes" (Nubian Formation) within the trachyte. These have altered the trachyte at their margins to various shades of brown, hence the name of the ridge.

=== Lake Eggers ===
78.1°S 165.4166667°E. An ice-covered lake, 0.5 nautical miles (0.93 km; 0.58 mi) long, located just east of Rainbow Ridge in central Brown Peninsula. Named by US-ACAN (1999) after Alan J. Eggers, Department of Geology, Victoria University of Wellington, who, in December 1975 as a member of the VUWAE, sampled the Scallop Hill Formation at the north end of Brown Peninsula.

=== Frame Ridge ===
78°05′S 165°26′E. A small straight ridge in the central part of Brown Peninsula. It is located just north of the small, central lake on the peninsula and extends northward down to Tuff Bluff. Named by NZ-APC for A.O. Frame, paleontology technician with the New Zealand Geological Survey and Victoria University Expedition to the area, 1964-65.

=== Tuff Bluff ===
78°04′S 165°27′E. A small though prominent light-colored bluff on the northern slopes of Brown Peninsula. The bluff is significant geologically as a locality for trachytic tuff, from which the feature derives its name. Name applied by the NZ-APC following investigations by the New Zealand Geological Survey and Victoria University Expedition in the area, 1964-65.

=== Bratina Island ===
78°01′S 165°32′E. A small island lying at the north tip of Brown Peninsula in the Ross Ice Shelf. Named by US-ACAN in 1963 for Chief Aviation Machinists Mate Joseph Bratina, United States Navy Squadron VX-6, stationed at McMurdo Station in the 1958-59, 1960-61 and 1961-62 summer seasons.

=== Bratina Lagoon ===
78.030009°S 165.499626°E. A tidal lagoon of sand flats, ponds, and channels, about 700 metres (2,300 ft) long and 250 metres (820 ft) high wide, located on the southwest side of Bratina Island. Named by the New Zealand Geographic Board (NZGB) at the suggestion of C. Howard-Williams in association with Bratina Island.

== Sources ==
- Alberts, Fred G., ed. (1995), Geographic Names of the Antarctic (PDF) (2 ed.), United States Board on Geographic Names This article incorporates public domain material from websites or documents of the United States Board on Geographic Names.
- "Bellafronto Bight", Geographic Names Information System, United States Geological Survey, United States Department of the Interior
- "Bratina Lagoon", Geographic Names Information System, United States Geological Survey, United States Department of the Interior
- "Dreary Isthmus", Geographic Names Information System, United States Geological Survey, United States Department of the Interior
- "Lake Eggers", Geographic Names Information System, United States Geological Survey, United States Department of the Interior
- "Moraine Strait", Geographic Names Information System, United States Geological Survey, United States Department of the Interior
- Mount Discovery, USGS: United States Geological Survey
- "Swyers Point", Geographic Names Information System, United States Geological Survey, United States Department of the Interior

This article incorporates public domain material from websites or documents of the United States Geological Survey.
