= Lettau (surname) =

Surname list

People with the surname Lettau include:

- Andre Lettau, German poker player
- Georg Lettau (1878–1951), German lichenologist
- Heinz Lettau (1909–2005), professor of meteorology at the University of Wisconsin
- Kevyn Lettau (born 1959), American jazz vocalist
- Reinhard Lettau (1929–1996), German-American writer and professor
