= Lettau Bluff =

Lettau Bluff (76°57′S 167°0′E) is a rock and ice bluff that forms the central part of the western edge of Beaufort Island, and rises 200 metres (660 ft) above the Ross Sea off Antarctica. It was named after Professor Heinz H. Lettau of the University of Wisconsin, an authority on Antarctic meteorology who was active in the planning and development of the meteorological program and equipment for Plateau Station, 1966–68. With Paul C. Dalrymple and Sarah H. Wollaston he co-authored an analysis of the 1958 meteorological data from South Pole Station.
