= Cole Lake (Minnesota) =

Lake in Minnesota, United States

- Location within Minnesota
- Location: Carlton County, Minnesota
- Coordinates: 46°39′27″N 93°2′31″W
- Type: Lake
- Surface elevation: 1,296 feet (395 m)

Cole Lake is a lake in Carlton County, Minnesota, in the United States.

Cole Lake was named for James Cole, a pioneer who settled at the lake.

== See also ==
- List of lakes in Minnesota
