= Beaufort Island =

Island in Ross Sea off the coast of Antarctica

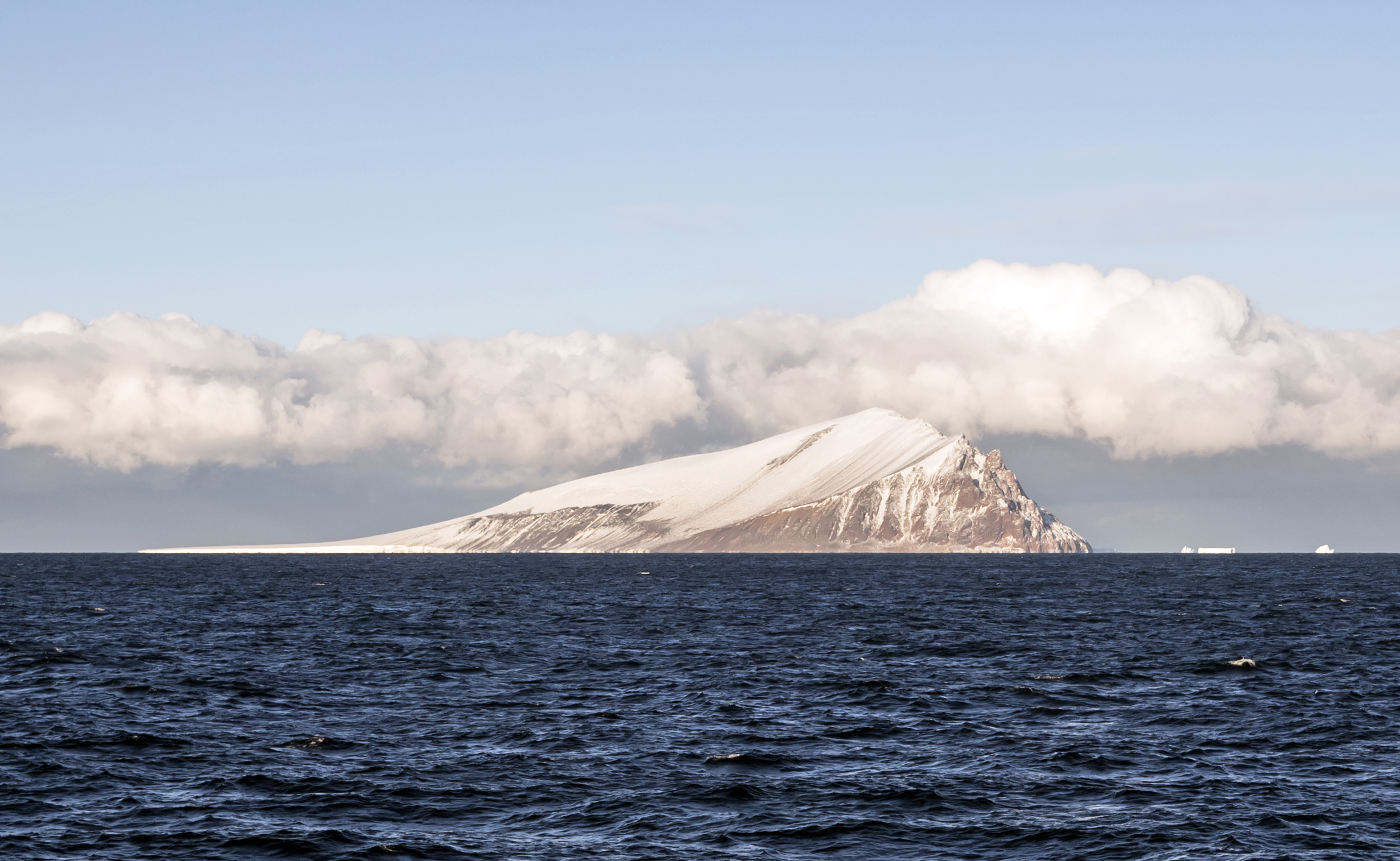
- Beaufort Island

- Location within Antarctica

Geography
- Location: Antarctica
- Coordinates: 76°57′S 166°57′E
- Archipelago: Ross Archipelago
- Area: 18.4 km^{2} (7.1 sq mi)
- Highest elevation: 771 m (2530 ft)
- Highest point: Paton Peak

Administration
- Administered under the Antarctic Treaty System

Demographics
- Population: Uninhabited

Beaufort Island is an island in Antarctica's Ross Sea. It is the northernmost feature of the Ross Archipelago, lying 21 kilometres (13 miles) north of Cape Bird, Ross Island. It is approximately 18.4 km^{2} (7 square miles) in area. It was first charted by James Clark Ross in 1841. Ross named the island for Sir Francis Beaufort, hydrographer to the British Royal Navy.

== Geography ==
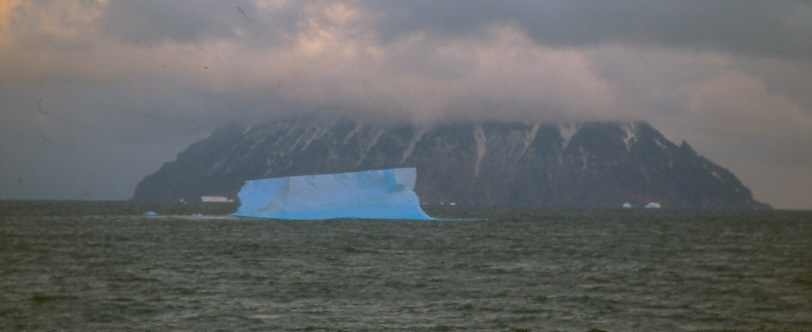
Beaufort Island and iceberg.

Beaufort Island is the eroded remains of a basaltic stratovolcano of unknown age. It is semi-circular in shape. The highest point in the island is Paton Peak, at 771 m (2,530 ft). The island has varied terrain and habitats. Much of the western side of the island is covered by moderately sloping ice fields with ice cliffs about 20 m (66 ft) high on the coast. The east and south sides of the island are mostly free of ice, with steep inaccessible cliffs that rise straight from the sea. Here the ice-free ground has a gentle slope and has ponds in summer and small meltwater streams that drain to the coast.

== Ecology ==
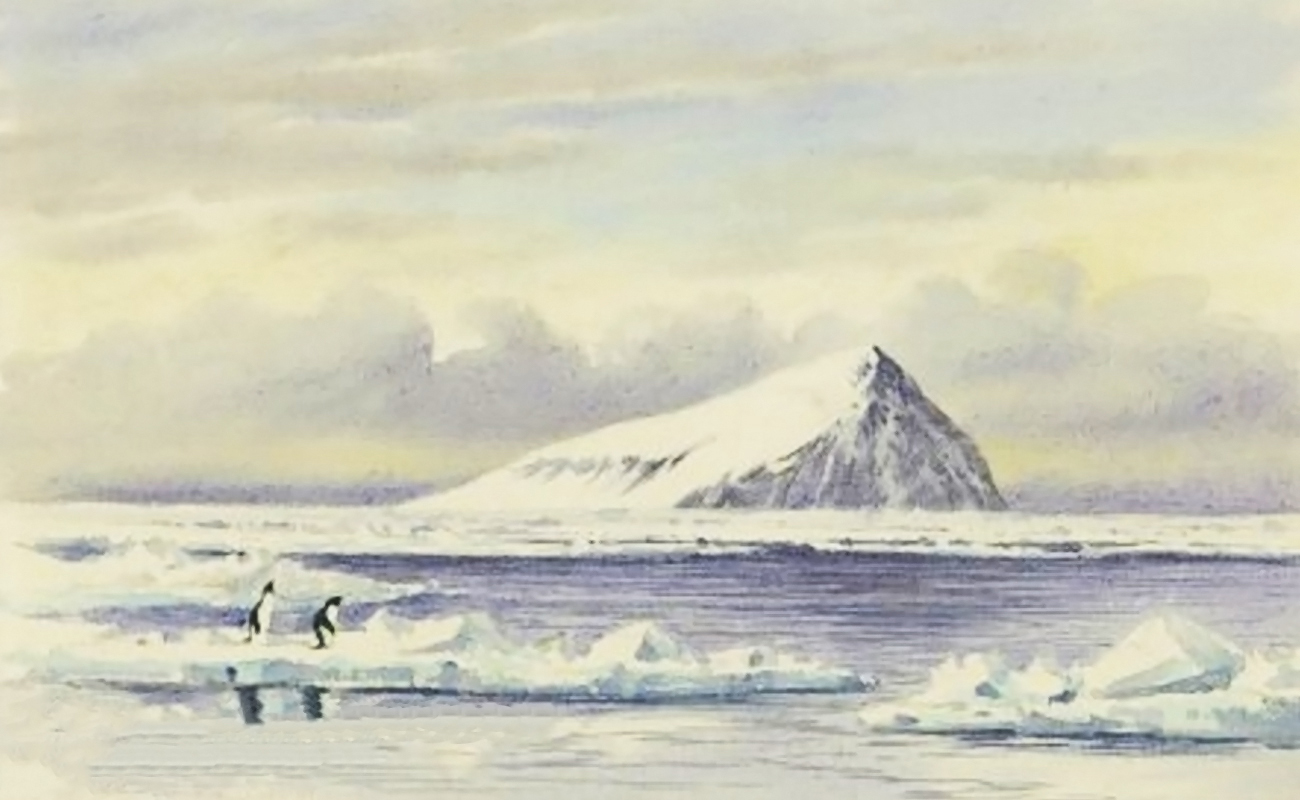
Beaufort Island (Watercolour 1911)

Beaufort Island is designated an Antarctic Specially Protected Area to preserve its natural ecological system and to protect its varied and numerous bird species. The island is isolated and difficult to access and is visited infrequently by people. It is largely undisturbed by direct human activity, and there have been fewer opportunities for the introduction of exotic species than other locations in the Ross Sea. Although some studies have been conducted on the island, it has not been comprehensively studied.

=== Birds ===
The island has a small colony of breeding emperor penguins on nearshore sea ice at the northern end, a large Adélie penguin colony on a raised beach called Cadwalader Beach at the south-western end, and several breeding colonies of south polar skua. It has been designated an Important Bird Area by BirdLife International.

=== Vegetation ===
The island has an extensive area of vegetation on a moraine bench 5–7 m (16.4–23.0 ft) above the beach at the north end of the island. The moraine bench is up to 50 m (164 ft) wide. The vegetation is dominated by the moss species Bryum argenteum. It is the most extensive and continuous area of mosses known of in the McMurdo Sound region. There is also a diverse community of algae. This location is one of the most southerly locations where red snow algae (Chlamydomonas sp., Chloromonas sp., and Chlamydomonas nivalis) are found. The location is favourable for vegetation growth because of warm summer temperatures. Its northerly aspect and the shelter provided by high ice cliffs protect against southerly winds. Water is supplied from the ice-cliffs and snow banks.

== See also ==
- Lettau Bluff
- List of Antarctic and subantarctic islands
- List of volcanoes in Antarctica
- List of islands
- Desert island
