= Rowley Gallery =

Coordinates: 51.5068°N 0.1947°W

The Rowley Gallery are picture frame makers and fine art dealers in London, England.

== History ==
=== Founding ===
Established in 1898 by Albert James Rowley and his wife Emma at 6 High Road, Silver Street, Kensington. (In 1909 Silver Street was renamed and whilst remaining in the same premises their new address became 140 Kensington Church Street.) Albert grew up in nearby Hammersmith, the son of James Rowley, an ecclesiastical carver and muralist. Emma grew up in Kensington and was the daughter of a local builder. The Rowley Gallery was founded in the same year that the couple married, as a small business specialising in picture framing, mounting, restoration, carving, gilding and exhibitions of paintings.

Albert had been a pupil at St Paul's School and his friendship with the artist Frank Brangwyn seems to date from this period through his association with Hammersmith's artistic community. Brangwyn worked for a while for William Morris who lived at Upper Mall in Hammersmith from 1878 until his death in 1896, and Albert was undoubtedly inspired by the legacy of the Arts and Crafts Movement established by Morris. Before very long The Rowley Gallery was also producing inlaid wood panels and furniture. Designs for panels were at first adapted from paintings by artists such as John Everett Millais, James McNeill Whistler and Lord Leighton, but then A J Rowley began to commission artists to make designs specifically for them. One of the first and most prolific of these artists was William Chase, who as well as creating many designs for inlay panels was also responsible for the distinctive Pan label used by The Rowley Gallery from 1912.

=== Church Street ===
By this time The Rowley Gallery premises had expanded and its address was now 140-142 Church Street, Kensington. Along with Chase, other artists included Henry Butler, Horace Mann-Livens, Robert Anning Bell and most notably Sir Frank Brangwyn. In the 1920s Rowley lived in the village of Ditchling, East Sussex at Hillway House, which had been designed by Arthur Joseph Penty and built on land acquired from Brangwyn, who lived in the neighbouring house, known as The Jointure. The working relationship between Rowley and Brangwyn was long standing. The Studio Yearbook in 1916 noted an exhibition at The Rowley Gallery of "panels executed in stained wood from pictures by Mr Brangwyn, Mr Chase and others. These panels were the result of a series of experiments carried out by Mr A J Rowley, and it must be admitted that they possess real decorative value and promise interesting developments". Over the years Brangwyn contributed numerous designs for panels which proved to be increasingly popular. Hollyhocks is in the collection of the William Morris Gallery and The Galleon can be found at the Cecil Higgins Art Gallery. Rowley Gallery artefacts can also be found in the collections of the Victoria & Albert Museum and Brighton Museum & Art Gallery.

Rowley's son Laurence joined the firm in the mid-1920s bringing his enthusiasm for furniture design. Throughout the 1920s and 1930s The Rowley Gallery became renowned for its inlay wood panels, mirrors and screens as well as for its silver leaf furniture and interiors. They had workshops in Campden Street, Kensington Place and Addison Bridge Place. According to Dennis Gale, workshop manager at Addison Bridge Place for several years during the 1930s, and husband of Rowley's daughter Betty, there were six cabinet makers, three French polishers, five workers in the paint shop and five seamstresses making curtains. Carpets were also designed and manufactured at these premises. There were two wood mills, and although some use of machinery was inevitable, dove-tailing was still done by hand. He remembered there to be a staff of around fifteen at Campden Street and about four or five porters at the main shop in Church Street.

Several well-known artists are recorded as having their work framed by The Rowley Gallery. Among those in the collection of the National Portrait Gallery are paintings by Harold Speed, Edward Wadsworth and Gluck (Hannah Gluckstein). By 1933 such was the success of the business that the premises at 140-142 Church Street were rebuilt in Portland stone, featuring a frieze designed by Brangwyn of three life-size carved wooden panels depicting sawyers, painters and carpenters. The interior decoration of the galleries featured walls "panelled in Japanese golden senwood with burnished silver fittings and black floors" (The Studio, 1933).

== Ravaged by War ==
Sadly much of this was lost during the Second World War when in 1941 the new building was hit by an incendiary bomb. Vere Hodgson noted in her diary – "Sunday 12th, woke late. Learned the big fire last night was in Church St. It was the Rowley Galleries – all burnt out. Great pots of paint and varnish on the top floor – went up like fun! Ran along to see it – the nicest shop in Church St. Remains of beautiful furniture and paintings all in the street." Somehow the Brangwyn panels survived and were later restored by Sam Alper and are displayed in the collection of Chilford Hall at Linton, Cambridgeshire. In the wake of this catastrophe The Rowley Gallery moved to their workshop premises at 86 & 87 Campden Street and from that time concentrated mainly on picture framing. A J Rowley died in 1944 and the business continued under the directorship of Laurence Rowley.

In 1967 Laurence's son, Christopher Rowley, was responsible for opening new showrooms at the present address, 115 Kensington Church Street, which had direct access to the workshops at 86 & 87 Campden Street. The Kensington News & West London Times noted The Rowley Gallery's return to Church Street - "The interior decoration of these new commodious and well-lit showrooms is befitting a company of artistic skill and taste. A silver gilt panelled ceiling and fabric covered walls blends well amidst the traditional design of a waxed pine shopfront. The entire effect is a pleasant reminder of earlier days before the advent of plastics and stainless steel." But sadly this relaunch proved unsuccessful and by 1969 the company was ready to close down.

== Rescue ==
The Rowley Gallery was rescued by Jonathan Savill and Jack Rutherford, two long standing customers, who bought the ailing company. Savill was responsible for running the business and his enthusiasm sustained The Rowley Gallery for over 25 years until his retirement in 1995. He sold the business to three employees, Chris Hamer, Kai Yin Lam and Cathy Williams who carried on trading as framemakers, gilders and restorers. Williams retired in 2003 and Hamer and Lam continue as The Rowley Gallery's present directors, nowadays not only framemaking, gilding and restoring, but also exhibiting contemporary paintings and prints.
