= White Island (Ross Archipelago) =

Island in Antarctica

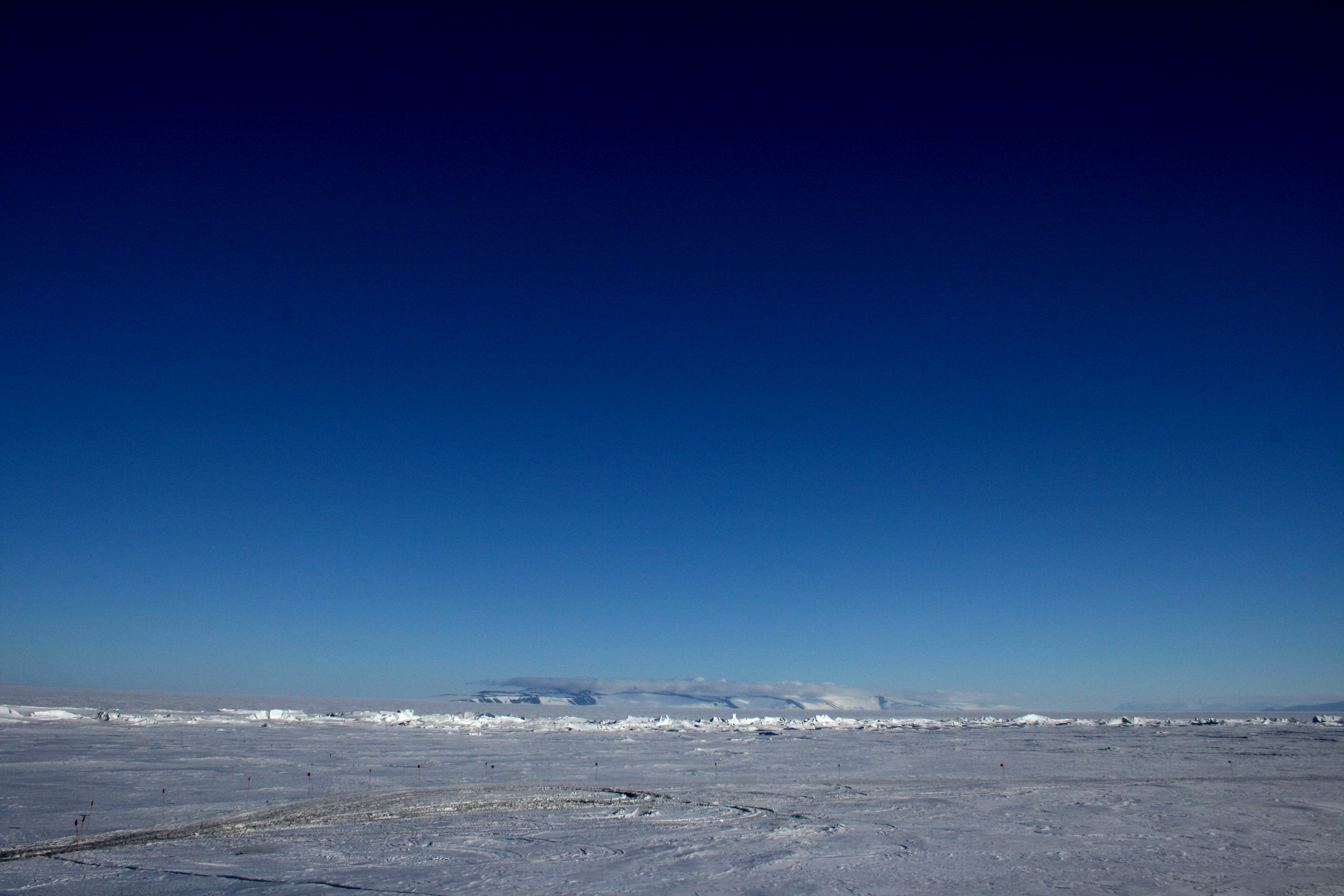
- White Island from Ross Sea

- Location within Antarctica

Geography
- Location: Antarctica
- Coordinates: 78°8′S 167°24′E
- Archipelago: Ross Archipelago

Administration
- Administered under the Antarctic Treaty System

Demographics
- Population: Uninhabited

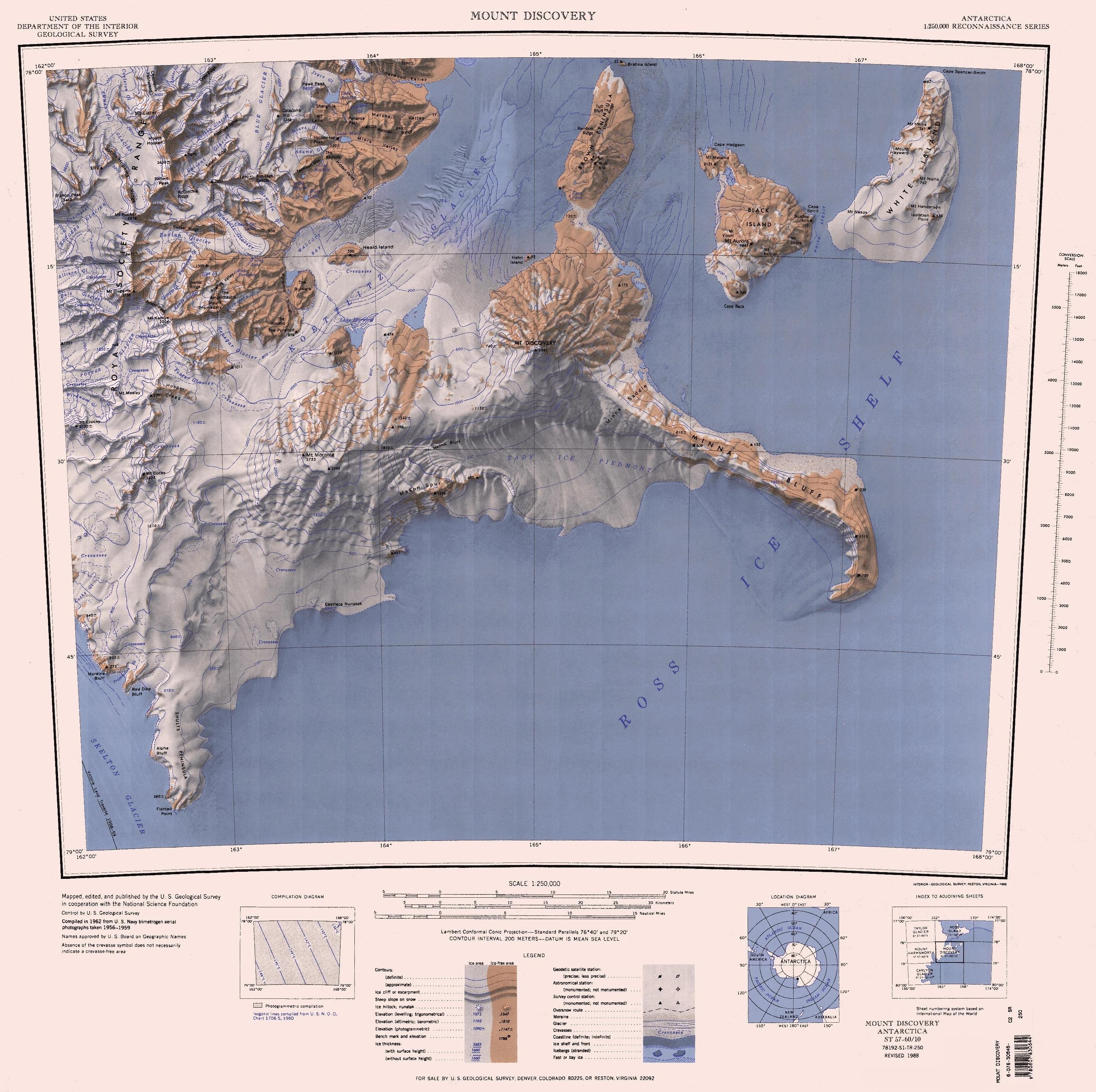

White Island (78°08′S 167°24′E) is an island in the Ross Archipelago of Antarctica. It is 15 nautical miles (28 km; 17 mi) long, protruding through the Ross Ice Shelf immediately east of Black Island. It was discovered by the British National Antarctic Expedition (1901–1904) and so named by them because of the mantle of snow that covers it.

== Protected Area ==
Some 142 km^{2} of shelf ice adjoining the north-west coast of the island has been designated an Antarctic Specially Protected Area (ASPA 137) because it supports an isolated, small breeding population of Weddell seals.

== Geology ==
White Island consists of two Pleistocene shield volcanoes overlain by volcanic cones. The last known eruption occurred 0.17 million years ago.

== Features ==
Features include, from south to north, Mount Nesos, Mount Henderson, Isolation Point, Mount Nipha, Mount Hayward, Mount Heine, and Cape Spencer-Smith.

=== Mount Nesos ===
78°12′S 167°06′E. The remnants of a volcanic core, over 400 metres (1,300 ft) high, projecting through the ice near the southwest end of White Island. Named by the New Zealand Geological Survey Antarctic Expedition (NZGSAE; 1958–59) from the Greek word nesos (nisos), meaning island, and referring to the fact that although isolated by the ice sheet the hill is a part of White Island.

=== Mount Henderson ===
78°11′S 167°20′E. A hill 2 nautical miles (3.7 km; 2.3 mi) west-northwest of Isolation Point in the south-central part of White Island. Named by the NZGSAE (1958–59) for G.B. Henderson, a member of that expedition.

=== Isolation Point ===
78°11′S 167°30′E. A small volcanic peak projecting through the ice sheet covering the southeast extremity of White Island. So named because of its remote position by the NZGSAE, 1958–59.

=== Davis Bluff ===
78.15°S 167.5833333°E. A rock bluff rising to 400 metres (1,300 ft) high, 2 nautical miles (3.7 km; 2.3 mi) northeast of Isolation Point. Named by United States Advisory Committee on Antarctic Names (US-ACAN; 2005) after Randall W. Davis, Department of Marine Biology, Texas A&M University, Galveston, Texas, who studied the Weddell seal in McMurdo Sound sea ice areas, 1977–2003, including winter season research at White Island with Michael A. Castellini (Castellini Bluff. q.v.), 1981.

=== Mount Nipha ===
78°09′S 167°24′E. A hill, 760 metres (2,490 ft) high, standing almost precisely in the center of White Island. Nipha is a Greek word for snow. So named by the NZGSAE (1958–59) because the hill is surrounded by ice and snow.

=== Castellini Bluff ===
78.15°S 167.1666667°E. A rock bluff rising to about 500 metres (1,600 ft) high between Dibble Bluff and Mount Nesos. Named by US-ACAN (2005) after Michael A. Castellini, Institute of Marine Sciences, University of Alaska, Fairbanks, AK, who studied the Weddell seal in McMurdo Sound sea ice areas, 1977-2004, including winter season research at White Island with Randall W. Davis (Davis Bluff), 1981.

=== Dibble Bluff ===
78.1166667°S 167.2166667°E. A conspicuous rock bluff, 1 nautical mile (1.9 km; 1.2 mi) south of Marshall Cirque on the west side of White Island, Ross Archipelago. The bluff rises abruptly from Murdo Ice Shelf to over 400 meters. Named by US-ACAN (1999) after Ray R. Dibble, Department of Geology, Victoria University of Wellington, who investigated volcanic eruptions and the seismicity of nearby Mount Erebus in five seasons, 1980–81 through 1984–85.

=== Mount Hayward ===
78°07′S 167°21′E. A hill 2 nautical miles (3.7 km; 2.3 mi) southwest of Mount Heine. Named by the NZGSAE (1958–59) for V. Hayward, a Canadian member of the Imperial Trans-Antarctic Expedition (1914–1917), who lost his life in a blizzard on May 8, 1916 when the sea ice in McMurdo Sound went out.

=== Mount Heine ===
78°05′S 167°27′E. A hill, 760 metres (2,490 ft) high, in the north part of White Island. Named by the NZGSAE (1958–59) for Arnold Heine, leader of their party who visited White Island. Heine, who climbed this hill, spent four summers and one winter in Antarctica, mostly in the McMurdo Sound area.

=== Marshall Cirque ===
78.0833333°S 167.2666667°E. An ice-filled cirque, 1 nautical mile (1.9 km; 1.2 mi) wide, located 1 nautical mile (1.9 km; 1.2 mi) southwest of Kienle Cirque on the west side of White Island. Named by US-ACAN (1999) after Dianne L. Marshall, Geophysical Institute, University of Alaska, Fairbanks, who investigated the volcanic activity and seismicity of nearby Mount Erebus in 1981–82 and 1982–83.

=== Kienle Cirque ===
78.0666667°S 167.35°E. An ice-filled cirque, 2 nautical miles (3.7 km; 2.3 mi) wide, the largest cirque on the west side of White Island. Named by US-ACAN (1999) after Juergen Kienle, Geophysical Institute, University of Alaska, Fairbanks, a team leader for the investigation of volcanic activity and seismicity at nearby Mount Erebus in six seasons, 1980–81 through 1985–86.

=== Speden Bench ===
78.028715°S 167.418146°E. A bench about 45 metres (148 ft) high on the west side of White Island, 1 nautical mile (1.9 km; 1.2 mi) from the north end. The bench comprises the northwest-most moraine-covered volcanic outcrops on the island, upon which occur tuffaceous conglomerate block and shell fragments of the Scallop Hill Formation. Named by US-ACAN (1999) after Ian G. Speden, New Zealand Geological Survey, DSIR, who, accompanied by A.C. Beck, collected fossiliferous deposits here, December 22, 1958.

=== Cape Spencer-Smith ===
78°00′S 167°27′E. The northernmost cape of White Island. Named by the NZGSAE (1958–59) for the Rev. Arnold P. Spencer-Smith, chaplain with the Ross Sea Party of the Imperial Trans-Antarctic Expedition (1914–1917), who died on March 9, 1916, on the return journey after laying the depots to Mount Hope for Shackleton's party. He had suffered from scurvy and had been carried for 40 days on a sledge by his companions prior to his death.

== Sources ==
- Alberts, Fred G., ed. (1995), Geographic Names of the Antarctic (PDF) (2 ed.), United States Board on Geographic Names This article incorporates public domain material from websites or documents of the United States Board on Geographic Names.
- "Castellini Bluff", Geographic Names Information System, United States Geological Survey, United States Department of the Interior
- "Davis Bluff", Geographic Names Information System, United States Geological Survey, United States Department of the Interior
- "Dibble Bluff", Geographic Names Information System, United States Geological Survey, United States Department of the Interior
- "Kienle Cirque", Geographic Names Information System, United States Geological Survey, United States Department of the Interior
- "Marshall Cirque", Geographic Names Information System, United States Geological Survey, United States Department of the Interior
- Mount Discovery, USGS: United States Geological Survey
- "Speden Bench", Geographic Names Information System, United States Geological Survey, United States Department of the Interior

This article incorporates public domain material from websites or documents of the United States Geological Survey.
