= Minna Bluff =

Peninsula in Antarctica

- Location within Antarctica

Geography
- Location: Victoria Land, Antarctica

Minna Bluff (78°31′S 166°25′E) is a narrow, bold peninsula, 25 nautical miles (46 km; 29 mi) long and 3 nautical miles (5.6 km; 3.5 mi) wide, projecting southeast from Mount Discovery into the Ross Ice Shelf, Antarctica. It was discovered by the British National Antarctic Expedition (1901-04) which named it for Minna, the wife of Sir Clements Markham, the "father" of the expedition. It culminates in a south-pointing hook feature (Minna Hook), and is the subject of research into Antarctic cryosphere history, funded by the National Science Foundation, Office of Polar Programs.

== Exploration and naming ==
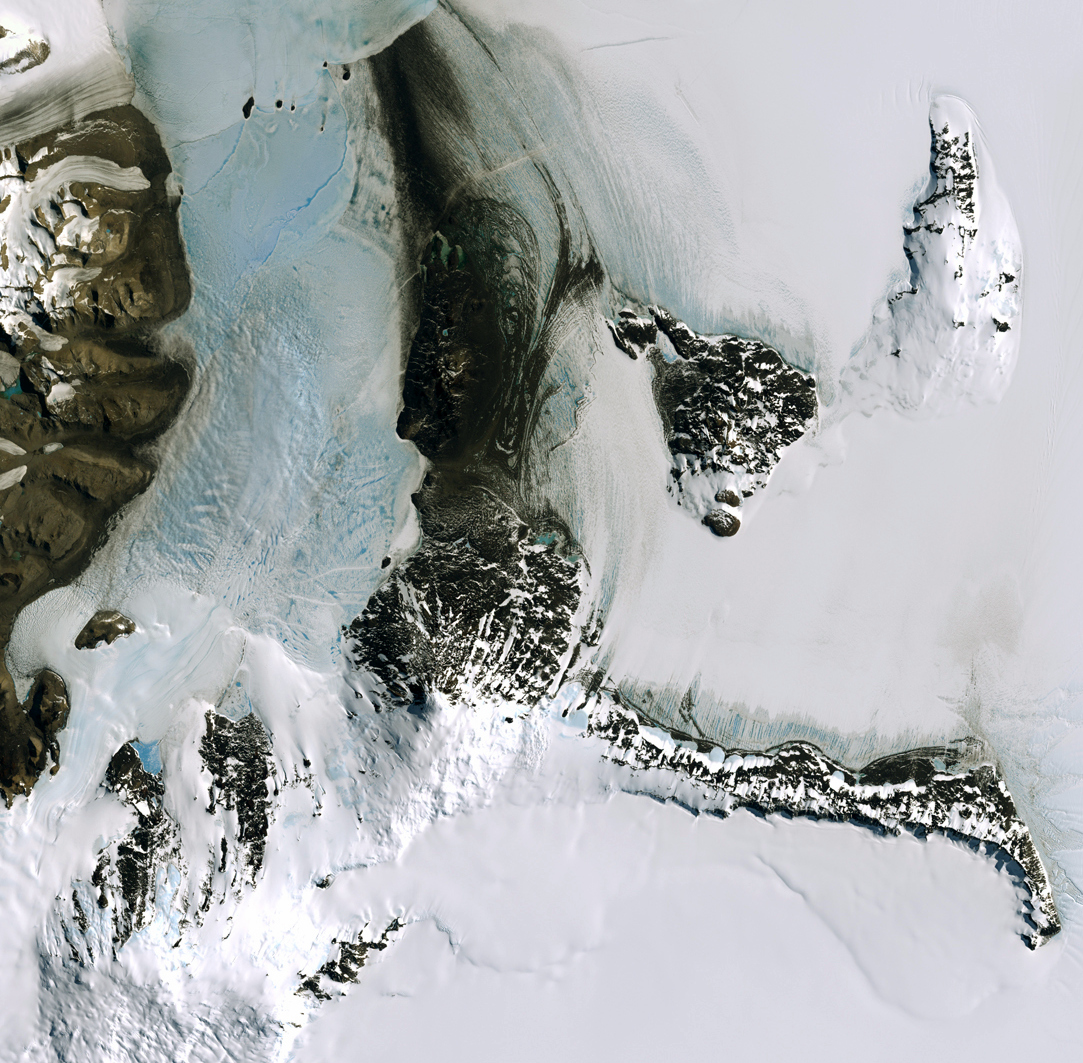
Mount Discovery, Black Island, and White Island; to the south Minna bluff

The bluff is mentioned repeatedly in the history of Antarctic exploration. It was first sighted in June 1902, during Captain Robert Falcon Scott's Discovery Expedition, 1901–04. It was thereafter recognised as a key landmark and location for vital supply depots for southern journeys towards the South Pole. Originally identified simply as "the Bluff", it was later named by Scott after the wife of Royal Geographical Society former president Sir Clements Markham.

Every expedition that followed Scott on this route after his pioneering journey (including Ernest Shackleton in 1908, Scott himself in 1911 and Shackleton's Ross Sea party in 1914-16) used Minna Bluff to position depots and as a critical marker to guide homeward journeys. Because of the state of the ice in its immediate vicinity, the polar route was established some 20 miles (32 km) to its east, depots being laid on this route within sight of the Bluff.

The researches of George Simpson, meteorologist on Scott's Terra Nova Expedition established that Minna Bluff has an effect on polar weather. The mass of the Bluff deflects eastward the southerly winds which sweep along the Ross Ice Shelf's eastern edge, and this deflection is then divided when the winds reach Ross Island some 50 mi (80 km) further north. One stream sweeps into McMurdo Sound, the other goes eastward to Cape Crozier. This division of the wind direction is, among other consequences, the cause of the "windless bight" area on the southern coast of Ross Island, an exceptionally cold area of fogs and low winds, encountered on various land journeys between McMurdo Sound and Cape Crozier undertaken on Scott's two expeditions.

== Location ==
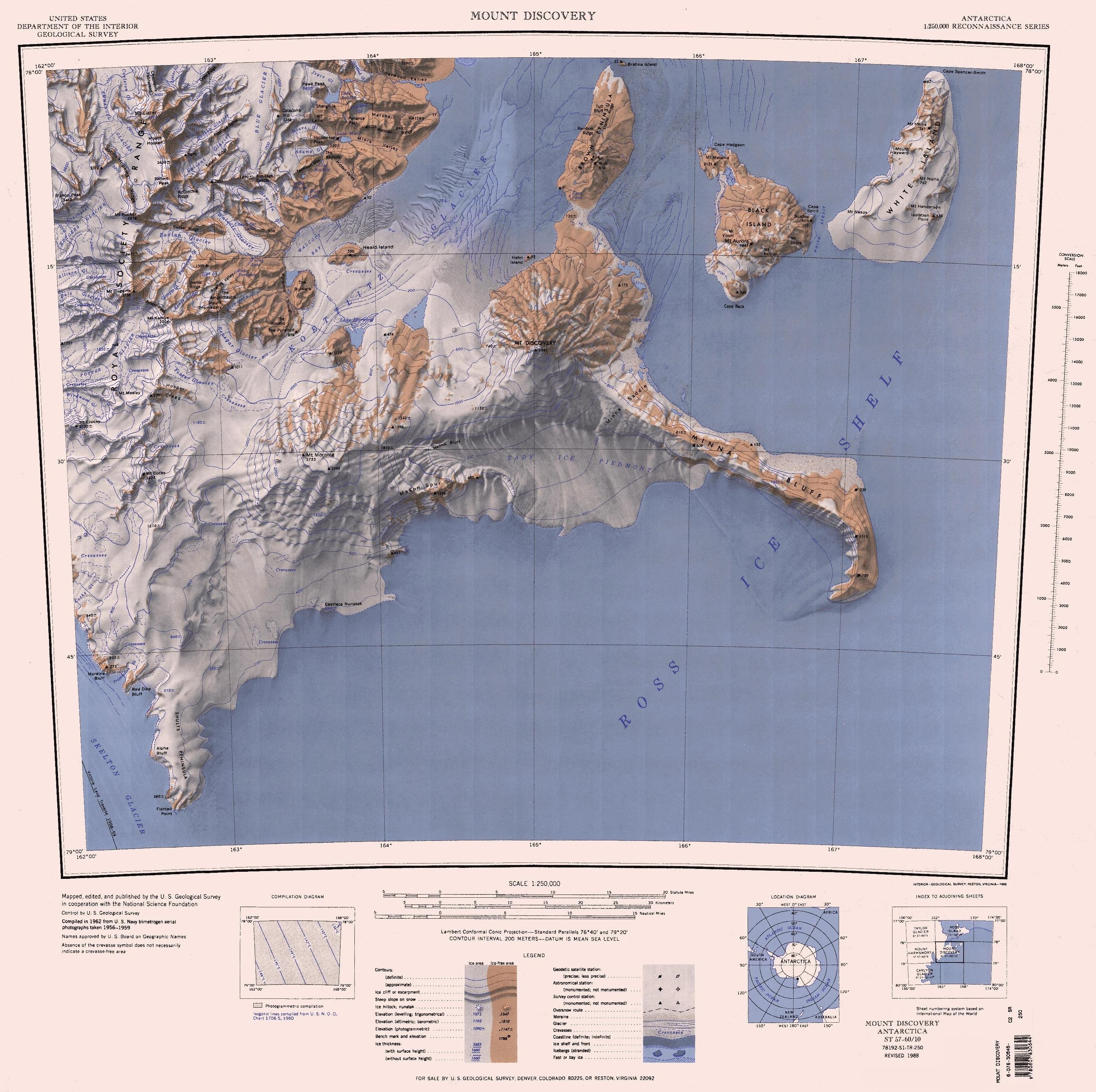
Minna Bluff in center east of map

Minna Bluff extends southeast from Mount Discovery into the Ross Ice Shelf. The Eady Ice Piedmont occupies the angle below Mount Discovery between Mason Spur and Minna Bluff. Black Island and White Island are to the north of the bluff. The bluff is the southernmost point of Victoria Land, and separates the Scott Coast to the north from the Hillary Coast of the Ross Dependency to the south.

== Features ==
=== Minna Saddle ===
78°26′S 165°33′E. A sweeping snow saddle, several miles long and wide, at the junction of Minna Bluff and the east slopes of Mount Discovery. It was named in 1958 for its association with Minna Bluff by the New Zealand party of the Commonwealth Trans-Antarctic Expedition, 1956-58.

=== McIntosh Cliffs ===
78.5333333°S 166.4°E. A line of steep, uneven, volcanic bluffs or cliffs, 16 nautical miles (30 km; 18 mi) long, forming the southwest side of the Minna Bluff peninsula, at the south end of Scott Coast. The height of the cliffs increases from west to east, ranging from 400–600 metres (1,300–2,000 ft) high above the Ross Ice Shelf. Named by US-ACAN (1999) after William C. McIntosh, Department of Geoscience, New Mexico Institute of Mining and Technology, Socorro, a member of the 1982 NMIMT field party that carried out the first geological mapping of Minna Bluff; additional field work at Mount Erebus, 1977-78, 1984-85; Mount Discovery and Mason Spur, 1983-84; Mount Murphy, 1985; Executive Committee Range, 1989-90; Crary Mountains, 1992-93.

=== Minna Hook ===
78°36′S 167°6′E. A massive hook-shaped volcanic feature, 9 nautical miles (17 km; 10 mi) long and rising to 1,115 metres (3,658 ft), that forms the southeast termination of the peninsula named Minna Bluff at the south end of Scott Coast. The name derives from Minna Bluff and was first used in a geologic sketch map and report by Anne Wright-Grassham in 1987.

=== Eady Ice Piedmont ===
78°31′S 165°20′E. The ice piedmont lying south of Mount Discovery and Minna Bluff, merging at the south side with the Ross Ice Shelf. Mapped by the United States Geological Survey (USGS) from ground surveys and Navy air photos. Named by the United States Advisory Committee on Antarctic Names (US-ACAN) in 1963 for Captain Jack A. Eady, United States Navy, Chief of Staff to the Commander, United States Naval Support Force, Antarctica, from July 1959 to April 1962.

=== Moore Embayment ===
78°45′S 165°00′E. A large ice-filled embayment between Shults Peninsula and Minna Bluff, along the northwest side of the Ross Ice Shelf. Discovered and named by Captain Robert F. Scott's Discovery expedition, 1901–04. Admiral Sir Arthur Moore, Naval Commander-in-Chief at Cape Town, placed the resources of the naval dockyard at Cape Town at the disposal of the Discovery for much-needed repairs before the ship proceeded to New Zealand and the Antarctic.

== Sources ==
- Alberts, Fred G., ed. (1995), Geographic Names of the Antarctic (PDF) (2 ed.), United States Board on Geographic Names This article incorporates public domain material from websites or documents of the United States Board on Geographic Names.
- Bickel, Lennard (2000). Shackleton's Forgotten Men. London: Random House. ISBN 0-7126-6807-1.
- Cherry-Garrard, Apsley (1983). The Worst Journey in the World. London: Penguin Books. ISBN 0-14-009501-2.
- "McIntosh Cliffs", Geographic Names Information System, United States Geological Survey, United States Department of the Interior
- Minna Hook, AADC: Australian Antarctic Data Centre
- Mount Discovery, USGS: United States Geological Survey
- Riffenburgh, Beau (2004). Nimrod. London: Bloomsbury Publications. ISBN 0-7475-7253-4.
- Solomon, Susan (2001). The Coldest March. New Haven: Yale University Press. ISBN 0-300-09921-5.
- Wilson, Edward A. (1973). Diary of the Discovery Expedition. London: Blandford Press. ISBN 0-7137-0431-4.

This article incorporates public domain material from websites or documents of the United States Geological Survey.
