= Ross Archipelago =

Group of islands in Antarctica

- Location within Antarctica

Geography
- Location: Antarctica
- Coordinates: 77°30′S 167°0′E

Administration
- Antarctica
- Administered under the Antarctic Treaty System

Demographics
- Population: 0

Ross Archipelago (77°30′S 167°0′E) is a name for that group of islands which, together with the ice shelf between them, forms the eastern and southern boundaries of McMurdo Sound in Antarctica. The most northerly is Beaufort Island, then comes Ross Island, the Dellbridge Islands, and Black Island and White Island. Frank Debenham's classic report, The Physiography of the Ross Archipelago, 1923, described "Brown Island" (now Brown Peninsula) as a part of the group.

== See also ==
- Composite Antarctic Gazetteer
- List of Antarctic and sub-Antarctic islands
- List of Antarctic islands south of 60° S
- SCAR
- Territorial claims in Antarctica
