= List of Nebulous characters =

Nebulous is a BBC Radio 4 science fiction-comedy written by Graham Duff and produced by Nicholas Briggs. The programme follows the adventures of KENT, the Key Environmental Non-judgmental Taskforce, a desperately underfunded Government organisation dedicated to protecting the environment and doing laundry in a post-apocalyptic world following a terrible eco-disaster known as the Withering.

== KENT ==
=== Professor Nebulous ===
Played by Mark Gatiss, Professor (Boffo) Nebulous is the protagonist of Nebulous, a brilliant scientist and the unappreciated leader of KENT whose downfall is a direct result of his destruction of the Isle of Wight while he was moving it slightly to the left by 10 kilometres to give it more sun on Janril 57, 2069, destroying everyone on the island. He is often prone to going off on long metaphorical tangents while discussing the current crisis, only to stop himself and say "I'm drifting" when he goes too far.

His nickname at school was "NOBulous".

Nebulous's past is shown by brief flashbacks triggered by the word "clown" (or even words that sound like "Clown"; on one occasion a flashback was just triggered by the word "Cloud"). Nebulous's scientific bent and serious demeanour are explained by Nebulous's parents who both forced him to become a circus clown at the expense of his scientific studies. Although his reputation has suffered greatly due to the destruction of the Isle of Wight, Nebulous has made several prominent discoveries in his career, such as a cure for blindness and a sandwich that cures cancer (Marmalade and cucumber, apparently), as well as continuing to defend Earth despite the poor funding available to him. He also has an evil twin brother called Professor Spiffo Nebulous, who is his physical double apart from having a moustache, being somewhat overweight, and lacking both thumbs (due to a freak Game Boy accident). The twins had a dimmer brother named Mofo, whom Spiffo killed in a knife-throwing incident. Originally Nebulous was happy being a clown and put all his time and effort into it, until he met his future self, who convinced him to become a scientist.

=== Paula Breeze ===
Played by Rosie Cavaliero, Paula Breeze is the ditsy assistant to Professor Nebulous, although how she qualified for a position in such an organisation given her apparent lack of any degree at all is a mystery. Paula is constantly pursuing her infatuation with Nebulous, despite him not noticing; any attempts that may actually get anywhere are always ended by her own idiocy. Although she commonly comes across as an infatuated idiot, she is clearly devoted to Professor Nebulous, and has managed to come up with some relatively good ideas when under pressure. It was eventually revealed that she is actually a human/Atlantean hybrid and the heir to the throne of Atlantis—having grown up in an orphanage, she apparently assumed that the nuns were her real parents and she had forty-five brothers and sisters, but she turned down her mother's offer to take the throne at the time to remain with Nebulous.

=== Rory Lawson ===
Played by Graham Duff, Rory Lawson is Professor Nebulous' other assistant, the self-professed ladies' man of the team (although his only successful romantic liaison was with Paula when both of them were drunk and 1/4 of an alien senturian from the 9th galactic sector whilst at Woodstock during Hendrix's set) who handles the more physical side of operations. Having taken an evening class in Media Studies and Applied Thinking, Rory yearns for the covert ops action and explosive confrontations of a top profile Government Agent but has to make do with aiding the team in cleaning clothes and repairing tumble driers. He appears to be somewhat more intelligent than Paula, having apparently blown up Buckingham Palace during his chemistry class at school (Although in his defence he claims that the building was already scheduled for demolition and the Royal Family were away at the time). His catchphrase is "Bollocks!... Sir".

=== Harry Hayes ===
Played by Paul Putner, Harry Hayes is the fourth member of KENT, responsible for technological development. Though previously a handsome physically spectacular specimen of a man, he was badly injured when Professor Nebulous disintegrated the Isle of Wight, having entered the unshielded control room to try and reverse the process and being badly injured in the resulting blast. He was rebuilt by the Professor and lives his life in constant agony while trundling around in a wheelchair constructed from old kitchen units, though in recent episodes the Professor has given him a new hover chair with slat grates that allow him access to everywhere he could want to go (Which just annoys Harry more as he has less to moan about now). Harry often ends up reminding everyone that while most members of KENT have minor problems, he suffers more than anyone, such as commenting that Paula was just suffering from "some minor agony". He is also afflicted by a faulty electronic voice box that plays his voice at an unbearably high volume, but Nebulous's guilt over the accident prevents him from asking Harry to turn it down. Each episode features him saying, at least once, "UNLIKE YOU, PROFESSOR, I NO LONGER HAVE THE LUXURY OF [Insert bodypart of choice here]"; so far, he has claimed to have lost his chin, mouth, nose, eyes (with his optical scanners apparently processing the information and presenting it as a pie chart for some reason), hands (he initially claimed to retain one but more recently has stated that he only has a mechanical grabber), feelings, toes (all ten, which he now keeps in a jar), both legs, upper lip (although he retains the lower one), heart, fingers, nerves, head (Although Nebulous notes that Harry retains most of his head), brain (replaced with a chip that apparently causes him headaches), back (although he does have a hunch), arse (he mentioned that he has rented one from an unidentified source), spleen, heart, eye-teeth and normal teeth. However, he does still have his inner ear, albeit with his inner ear now an outer ear located on his neck. Commonly, Harry remains at KENT HQ during the team's missions, although he has departed it on some occasions, such as when he reinvented the vacuum cleaner. Despite his betrayal of the team at the end of series one to aid Doctor Klench, Harry has been forgiven by Nebulous in series two, apparently recognising that Nebulous at least respects him as a scientist unlike Klench's contempt for him as a physical presence.

=== Gemini ===
Gemini, played by Julia Dalkin, is the AI of KENT and the narrator of the title sequence and the ending credits. Although supposed to have the combined intelligence of three Oxford dons and a supply teacher, Gemini has failed a number of times, at one point switching off KENT's oxygen supply. The name suggests that there is a counterpart somewhere, but the only reference to this counterpart so far has been a brief comment about Gemini's evil twin, who was once sent to KENT on a weekend exchange program that the team prefer not to think about. (The character was originally called Gemini as it was intended to have two personalities and two voices; one male and one female. Whilst the idea was dropped, the name remained)

=== Sir Ronald Rowlands ===
Played by Graham Crowden, Ronald Rowlands is a Minister with Unusual Portfolio, KENT's attaché to the Government. Rowlands always pronounces Nebulous's name "Nebelarse" and cares little for KENT, commonly stating "I'd like to do what I can, but afraid I can't" and would be perfectly happy to close the organisation down if given the opportunity (This would appear to be a result of the destruction of the Isle of Wight, as he was perfectly happy to help Nebulous's younger self when Nebulous briefly time travelled into his own past), keeping them open only so long as they can prove their worth (Albeit mainly by doing his laundry). He was recently forced to invest in the organization when Nebulous realized that Rowlands had been using time travel to buy shares in companies that would succeed in the future, Nebulous blackmailing Rowlands into providing KENT with more funding or Nebulous would reveal his actions to the government.

== Other characters ==
=== Erica Flazenby ===
Played by Julia Deakin, Doctor Erica Flazenby is the rival and former love of Nebulous who is currently the director of LOUGHBOROUGH. The two met while at the Oxford University Islands and shared an apartment for a year, before breaking up under unrevealed circumstances, although their conversations when they reunited would suggest that deeper feelings remain on both sides. At the last moment, Erica Flazenby's name was changed from Erica Moody to its present form; the error remained in the press release from the BBC announcing the series debut.

=== Doctor Klench ===
Played by David Warner, Dr Joseph Klench is the arch-enemy of Professor Nebulous and KENT whom the Professor describes as "a chap who came to a crossroads in life and took a turning marked evil. He put his foot to the accelerator and he's not stopping". His plans to date have included luring a sentient cactus to Earth, destroying the world with a stolen star fragment, destroying the Intergalactic peace conference while in Nebulous' body, trapping Nebulous in the past at the moment he destroyed the Isle of Wight, and provoking a war between the surface world and Atlantis, although all five attempts have been thwarted by the Professor and the KENT team. Nebulous has claimed that he and Klench are in many ways rather alike, reflecting that they might have been friends or even Siamese twins in another life, although Klench has only ever expressed contempt for Nebulous, refusing even to tell Nebulous his plan on the grounds that he wasn't interested in hearing Nebulous's snide comments. Klench also parodies the Master from Doctor Who: like the Master he miniaturises his enemies, although—unlike the Master—rather than killing them, he carries them around in his suitcase to remind him of his power.

=== Nebulous's parents ===
Played by Matt Wolf and Julia Dalkin, Nebulous's parents appear only in flashbacks (although a shape-shifting alien recently posed as Nebulous's father while trying to escape a prison ship); in each episode Nebulous has a flashback to his childhood, in which his parents wanted him to become a clown and ignored such major scientific discoveries as his cure for blindness. Nebulous commonly awakes from these flashbacks saying "I shall not clown". To date, only Nebulous's former fiancée Erica Flazenby has demonstrated an awareness that Nebulous has these flashbacks, as he commonly attempts to pass them off with such comments as "Haven't you ever seen a man collapse before?" without admitting that he has a problem. The evidence would also suggest that only Erica is actually aware of Nebulous's difficult relationship with his parents; although Paula is aware of Nebulous's childhood in the circus after a time-travelling experience took them back to the Professor's childhood, and Harry mentioned that Nebulous's old reputation was based on the inspirational idea of him going from a clown to become a scientific genius, neither of them appear to be aware of the full details of what his life was like as he grew up. It was revealed that they had two other children, Spiffo and Mofo Nebulous, with the Nebulous we know being "Boffo", but Mofo was killed by Spiffo during a knife-throwing "trick" while they were children and Spiffo was later sentenced to an infinite life sentence in Biros Optimum Security Prison (How the parents reacted to this is unknown). Subsequent episodes revealed that they eventually disowned Nebulous due to his continued interest in the sciences, and he apparently has never seen them since

=== The Infernons ===
The Infernons are a race of aliens made out of fire (the name Infernon comes from Inferno) from the planet Burnos. Because they are made out of fire, they have to cover themselves with black metallic cloaks. If they are stoked regularly, an Infernon can live almost indefinitely, but the race is nearly extinct due to the Great Crazy Foam Monsoon of 2095. They are minor villains in the series who have appeared twice so far. They first appeared in series two when they helped Dr. Klench on the agreement that Klench would help let their race survive, and then in series three the Infernons helped a history lecturer destroy the past so there was less to teach. The Infernons appear to know little about how the human body works, as is evidenced by Nebulous tricking them into thinking they live via photosynthesis.
