= List of Nebulous episodes =

The front cover of the first series CD release of Nebulous

Nebulous is a British comedy-sci-fi broadcast on BBC Radio 4, starring Mark Gatiss as the title character, and also starring and written by Graham Duff. Set in 2099 AD, the series covers the work Professor Nebulous, head of K.E.N.T. (The Key Environmental Non-Judgmental Taskforce), an organisation designed to solve the problems the Earth's ruined environment.

Currently, three series of six episodes each have been broadcast. The first series was broadcast between 6 January and 10 February 2005. The second was broadcast between 5 April and 10 May 2006. The third and most recent series was broadcast between 15 May and 19 June 2008. All of the episodes have been written by Duff, have been produced by Ted Dowd and directed by Nicholas Briggs. So far, only the first series has been released on CD, but it has been announced that the BBC plans to release the second and third series at an unknown date.

== First series ==
No. in series	Title	Original release date
1	"Holofile 117: The Night of the Vegetarians"	6 January 2005
A series of mysterious deaths around Weston-Hyper-Mare leads the Professor to the last vegetarian colony, run by the notorious Dr Klench. Upon closer investigation, K.E.N.T. discover an insidious plan involving a super-intelligent cactus from space, brainwashing, extreme vegetarianism and cactus pricks.
2	"Holofile 154: The Loverly Invasion"	13 January 2005
In a parody of the Doctor Who episode "The Claws of Axos", A trio of beautiful, naked men land in the withered Midlands of England, and only Professor Nebulous suspects that all may not be as it seems, claiming that they are in fact "giant electric worms, who drool acid and bark". Taking matters into his own hands, Nebulous attempts to kill the Lovely before a potentially terrible meeting with the world leaders.
3	"Holofile 722: The Dust Has Landed"	20 January 2005
A nationwide attack of dust leads K.E.N.T. to Edgware, where they discover a speck of sentient dust so powerful, it necessitates the reinvention of the vacuum cleaner and a team-up of the resources of K.E.N.T. and L.O.U.G.H.B.O.R.O.U.G.H., where Nebulous meets his ex-fiancée, Erica Flazenby, and Rory discovers the joys of black helicopters and applies for a transfer.
4	"Holofile 333: Madness Is a Strange Colour"	27 January 2005
After Sir Ronald Rowlands suffers a nervous breakdown in his newly redecorated office. K.E.N.T. investigates, and discovers that the Vartox Paint Company's new colour, Garrow, is sending people insane. With Sir Ronald and Rory driven mad, and Nebulous' leg having been broken, it is up to Paula and Harry to whiten the paint before the entire government is driven mad by their new wallpaper.
5	"Holofile 969: The Coincidence Machine"	3 February 2005
An invention of Nebulous' mentor – a machine that observes and records coincidences – threatens the world with "Coinci-clasm" in which reality will become one massive coincidence; if not stopped, it will cause mankind to pass into the Weirderness, where they shall simply die out. To solve the case, the Professor must contact a terrible alternate universe: A world where everything is spelled different (literally; everything is spelled "different") and the curtains are a terrible pattern.
6	"Holofile 237: The Man Who Polished the Sun"	10 February 2005
The effort to rid the world of the cold and drizzly season of Hamble is hijacked and the Earth is now endangered by a dwarf star. Klench escapes prison at this point and, aided by a treacherous Harry Hayes, attempts to use the energy of the star to hold the world to ransom. Meanwhile, Paula attempts to take Rory's advice to attract the Professor by ignoring him (she barely lasts twenty seconds).

== Second series ==
No. in series	Title	Original release date
1	"Holofile 023: The Deptford Wives"	5 April 2006
In a parody of The Stepford Wives and Jurassic Park, several men are found dead and the only link is the fact that all had recently married a cloned "Deptford Wife" from the Deptford Islands, who have been programmed to pamper with extreme prejudice ... one of whom has just been purchased by Harry. Guest stars Peter Davison.
2	"Holofile 993: The Buzzing"	12 April 2006
Investigating mysterious deaths where the victims have sneezed themselves to death, Nebulous and Rory find themselves pitted against a race of bee/wasp hybrids known as the Bosps, capable of controlling the world's supply of pollen, while Paula falls under the control of the evil hive mind. Guest stars Steve Coogan.
3	"Holofile 316: I, Nebulous"	19 April 2006
Dr. Klench reappears with a plan to murder all the delegates of a galactic peace conference, aided by the deadly fire-based aliens known as the Infernons, with his mind in the body of Professor Nebulous, purely to embarrass Nebulous, who is in charge of security for the conference.
4	"Holofile 767: Destiny of the Destinoyd"	26 April 2006
On a trip to the decommissioned Moon base, Nebulous falls in love with a beautiful female ghost known as Franabelle, while Paula and Rory find that a "Destinoyd" has escaped, and may be responsible for the deaths of several men.
5	"Holofile 840: Tempus Fugitive"	3 May 2006
Called in to investigate the groundbreaking work of scientist Doctor Linda Adnil, who has developed time travel, the K.E.N.T. team find themselves in three different years to find aspects of her that were fractured across time: Rory meets a hippie Lindavidual in 1969 at Woodstock; Harry travels to the year 7001, following the "UltraWithering", where everyone was reduced to single body parts, leaving Harry the most complete human in existence; and the Professor and Paula are sent to 2066 where they meet the Professor's childhood self. Guest stars Kate O'Mara.
6	"Holofile 644: Last of the Present Sirius"	10 May 2006
Professor Nebulous is finds himself trapped in a time loop, on the weekend omnibus of a reality television series endlessly repeating like "an insane merry-go-round, each elliptical revolution taking it further from reality, the children on the merry-go-round clinging to the brightly painted wooden horses for security, but the horses are starting to mutate, turning into Shetland Ponies". Escaping from the show, the Professor finds himself on Sirius, the Dog Star (a.k.a. Poodle Sphere Six), coming to the end of his tenth season.

== Third series ==
No. in series	Title	Original release date
1	"Holofile 001: Genesis of the Aftermath"	15 May 2008
Nebulous meets up with Doctor Klench, who claims to have met the Byborg who have persuaded him to no longer being evil. The Byborg allow people to go back in time and correct their greatest mistakes. In Nebulous's case, this was the destruction of the Isle of Wight. He travels back to Janril 57, 2069, in order to correct his error, but it turns out to be another of Klench's traps. Meanwhile, there is something unusual about Sir Ronald's stock deals.
2	"Holofile 551: The Past Must Be Destroyed!"	22 May 2008
Nebulous returns to his old university, Bridgeoxton, in order to solve the mystery of the disappearance of several lecturers. K.E.N.T. goes undercover, with Nebulous being a history lecturer. Rory, doing a course in Media Studies, discovers that the disappearances have been caused by the Infernons, working alongside a history lecturer who is trying to destroy the past, so there is less of it to teach. Guest stars Julia Davis.
3	"Holofile 013: The Girl With the Liquid Face"	29 May 2008
Following the murder of the delegates at an eco-troubleshooting conference on Pancake Day Island, Nebulous, Paula, and Harry travel to Atlantis while Rory attempts to clean up for the new delegates. While the Professor battles the legendary Kraken, Paula is shocked to learn that she is actually the hybrid human/Atlantean daughter of Atlantis' queen, and Doctor Klench tries to destroy the eco summit using Atlantis' defence system.
4	"Holofile 959: We, Nebulous"	5 June 2008
Returning to K.E.N.T. after a trip away, Paula and Rory are contacted by Nebulous, who informs them that he has been incarcerated in Biros Optimum Security Prison alongside the galaxy's most evil masterminds ... only to learn too late that they have actually rescued Nebulous' long lost evil twin brother, Professor "Spiffo" Nebulous, forcing K.E.N.T.'s Nebulous (whose first name is Boffo) to confront his evil twin at last.
5	"Holofile 011: Rebel Without a Cortex"	12 June 2008
Nebulous and his team have to transport a dangerous criminal to Venus: a shapeshifting alien known as a Yarwood. It morphs into a female Loverley in front of Rory, Nebulous' father in front of the Professor, and as Nebulous himself in front of Paula.
6	"Holofile 703: Us and Phlegm"	19 June 2008
When 99 percent of the nation's workforce phone in sick, Nebulous – the only K.E.N.T. member still in perfect health – comes face to face with a very unpleasant alien life form in the form of the Phlegmbions (A phlegm/mucus hybrid) ... allied with none other than his childhood doctor, Doctor Beep. Special Guest Star David Tennant.

== "Missing" Episodes ==
In the sleeve notes of the Series One audiobook, written in 2006, series writer Graham Duff asks for assistance in finding episodes "currently missing from the BBC archive". The article is a parody of when television and radio stations such as the BBC used to "wipe" episodes of TV and radio programmes, and record over them, especially the loss of many early Doctor Who and Dad's Army episodes. In the notes, Duff claims that as a result of wiping, "many classic Nebulous episodes were destroyed, along with editions of iconic Radio 4 shows such as Gardeners' Question Time and Money Box Live."

According to Duff, even after the discovery of two episodes from Season 6 – "The Man Who Kissed His Own Brain" and "Tomorrow is a Tunnel" – which were apparently found in the basement of a LDS Church near Chorley in September 2005, there are still a further 23 episodes officially missing from the BBC archive, including the entirety of Season 10.

Duff describes the "Missing" Season 10 episodes as follows:

No. in series	Title
1	"When Bagpipes Walked The Earth"
The K.E.N.T. team travel to Scotland, where they discover that the Loch Ness Monster is in fact a man in a costume being controlled by a race of deep fried aliens. This episode is notable for the Professor's famous speech where he declares, "A man should be judged by his actions, not by the colour and complexity of his tartan."
2	"Genesis of the Faceless Ambassadors of Fury"
In this, Nebulous' fifth encounter with the Faceless Ambassadors, he is transported back to the time of their creation so he can wipe them out before they lose their faces, become ambassadors, or begin to feel furious.
3	"The Forever Sandwich"
Nebulous is initially unconcerned when he is unable to finish his cheese sandwich. However, he soon discovers he is dealing with an infinite sandwich and immeasurable garnish. Featuring special guest star Brian Blessed as the voice of the Sandwich.
4	"Terror of the Horrornauts"
Nebulous encounters an ancient evil. Deliberately wiped by the BBC, because it was originally deemed too scary to ever be repeated, this episode prompted an unprecedented number of complaints. Questions were asked in the House and there was even a suggestion that the Queen may be forced to abdicate.
5	"The Farmers"
The K.E.N.T. team accidentally travel back to the time of the inclosure acts and battle the evil land baron Sir Sedgemund De Wolf. A rare historical episode, "The Farmers" is now principally remembered for its notorious "Trial By Seed Drill" scene.
6	"The Power of the Cushions"
When a series of government officials are found partially devoured following an innocent sit down, Nebulous suspects some old enemies might be at the bottom of it. This episode marks the first appearance of the Supreme Scatter Cushion.

Duff also claims that in October 2005, a 49-second segment of the otherwise "missing" Season 8 episode "The Flesh Eating Cushions" was discovered in a locked BBC cupboard.

== Notes ==
- Duff, Graham, "Can You Help?" and "Those Missing Episodes". Nebulous: Series 1 – Sleeve Notes. Published by BBC Audiobooks and Baby Cow Productions. Written in 2006 and published on 2007-02-05.
- Wolf, Ian: Nebulous – Episode Guide. British Comedy Guide. Retrieved on 2009-01-30.
- Episode Synopsis. Nebulous City. Retrieved on 2009-01-30.
