= Oriana Wilson =

British humanitarian (c. 1874–1945)

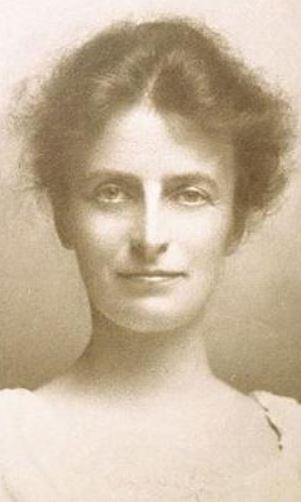
Oriana Wilson

Oriana Fanny Wilson, CBE (née Souper; c. 1874 (Note: Sources differ; 1873 or 1876 have been claimed but her birth was registered in 1874 and she was christened at Bradfield on 18 October 1874) – 25 April 1945) was a British naturalist and humanitarian who received the Commander of the Order of the British Empire for her services during the First World War. Her husband was the polar explorer Edward Adrian Wilson.

== Early life ==
Oriana Souper was born in Bradfield, Berkshire, in circa 1874 (Note: Sources differ; 1873 or 1876 have been claimed but her birth was registered in 1874 and she was christened at Bradfield on 18 October 1874) as the oldest child of Fanny Emmeline (née Beaumont) and Francis Abraham Souper, a clergyman and headmaster of Bradfield College. The 1881 census listed her as six years old with three younger siblings, James F. T., Noel Beaumont, and Constance. When she was twelve, her mother died, which required her to care for the household.

Before her marriage, she worked as a matron at a prep school in Cheltenham.

== Naturalist work ==
Reverend George Seaver described Wilson as "a good field naturalist and blest with a quick and lively observation", saying that she, like her husband, had a particular affinity for birds. Wilson collected the holotype for the Australasian bent-wing bat, for which Oldfield Thomas named the species Miniopterus orianae.

In 1914, Leiper and Atkinson named a cestode genus after her, Oriana, with the type species of the genus as Oriana wilsoni. However, Oriana was recognised as a synonym of Tetrabothrius, so the species was renamed as T. wilsoni.

== Later life and death ==
During the First World War, Wilson worked to provide comforts to New Zealand troops in Britain. She was awarded the Commander of the British Empire in the 1918 New Year Honours in recognition of her "signal services". The award was given mainly in association with her work as honorary secretary of the Hospital Comforts Committee, which came under the New Zealand Red Cross.

Wilson destroyed much of her personal correspondence, so details of her later life are few. However, she seemed to have travelled extensively through East Africa based on surviving correspondence with Apsley Cherry-Garrard. She also travelled to an area south of Port Darwin, Australia, that had been previously unvisited by Western women.

She died in a nursing home in Finchley, London, England on 25 April 1945.

== Personal life ==
In 1897, she met Edward Adrian Wilson, at Caius House, Battersea, while he was conducting mission work in London. They married on 16 July 1901, three weeks before Edward left on the Antarctic Discovery Expedition; the sledging flag she sewed for him was, after his death, displayed in Gloucester Cathedral and is now in the collection of the Scott Polar Research Institute. The wedding was in Hilton, Huntingdonshire, where her father was vicar.

Wilson was widowed by her husband's death on the Terra Nova Expedition in March 1912. Fundraising efforts for families of those who died on the expedition were enormously successful, especially considering that only five men died. The Mansion House raised £75,000 in 1912, equivalent to $7,300,000 in 2018. As a widow, Wilson's income included £300 annually in a government pension (equivalent to $29,180 in 2018); £8,500 as a one-time payment from the Mansion House trust (equivalent to $826,600 in 2018); and a £636 salary from the British Antarctic Expedition (equivalent to $61,850 in 2018). The loss of her husband was a blow to her faith, though she maintained it until the death of her brother during the Battle of the Somme. She did not remarry and had no children.

In New Zealand, she maintained a correspondence with poet Ursula Bethell.

== In published works ==
In 2013, Katherine MacInnes published a book about Wilson entitled Love and Death and Mrs Bill: a play about Oriana, wife of Polar explorer Edward Wilson.

== In popular culture ==
Wilson was portrayed by Anne Firth in the 1948 film Scott of the Antarctic, and by Sue Robinson in the 1985 television serial The Last Place on Earth.
