= Nebulous =

British Comedy radio show

- The front cover of the first series audiobook of Nebulous, featuring (from left to right) Graham Crowden, Rosie Cavaliero, Mark Gatiss and David Warner
- Genre: Comic science fiction, sitcom
- Running time: 28 minutes
- Country of origin: United Kingdom
- Language: English
- Home station: BBC Radio 4
- Starring: Mark Gatiss; Rosie Cavaliero; Graham Duff; Paul Putner; Julia Dalkin; Graham Crowden; David Warner
- Written by: Graham Duff
- Produced by: Ted Dowd
- Recording studio: The Moat Studio
- Original release: 6 January 2005 – 19 June 2008
- No. of series: 3
- No. of episodes: 18
- Audio format: Stereophonic sound
- Opening theme: Created by Malcolm Boyle.
- Website: Official website

Nebulous is a post-apocalyptic science fiction comedy radio show written by Graham Duff and produced by Ted Dowd from Baby Cow Productions; it is directed by Nicholas Briggs. The series premiered in the United Kingdom on BBC Radio 4. Set in the year 2099 AD, the show focuses on the adventures of the eponymous Professor Nebulous, director of operations for the eco-troubleshooting team KENT (the Key Environmental Non-Judgmental Taskforce) as they combat various catastrophes and try to set the world back on the right path following a worldwide environmental disaster known as "The Withering". As well as being a parody of a number of famous science fiction programmes, including Doctor Who, Quatermass and Doomwatch, Nebulous is considered a cult radio programme, attracting a number of guest appearances from famous actors.

There have been three series of Nebulous; the first was broadcast between 6 January and 10 February 2005. The series was well received by critics, and a second series was broadcast between 5 April and 10 May 2006, with a third series commissioned by the BBC which began broadcasting on Thursday, 15 May 2008. The first series was released on compact disc on 5 February 2007 by BBC Audio. Since 2009 all three series have been broadcast on BBC Radio 7. Duff has also announced that he is planning to make an animated series of Nebulous.

== Production ==
=== Development ===
The development of the series began with the production pilot episode, written by Graham Duff and produced by Baby Cow Productions in March 2003. The episode, which eventually became "Night of the Vegetarians", featured much of the final cast, but with a number of differences: a different actor played Rory, and Sir Ronald Rowlands was voiced by Duff, while Gemini originally had two voices: a female voice played by Julia Dalkin, and a male voice by Nicholas Briggs. Malcolm Boyle - who wrote the Nebulous theme and edited the pilot - had written an entire original score for the show. However, due to BBC radio budget limitations, this was not used in the completed series. Nicholas Briggs had also originally created a very deep, realistic soundscape, similar to those he had created for the Big Finish Productions Doctor Who audioplays, but was advised that "it's likely the listener will have distractions and will not listen to it more than once; therefore, the soundscape must be totally accessible from any point in the episode", toning down the sound effects to match the series' comic nature.

=== Recording ===
The Moat Studios in London recorded Nebulous in stereo, with each half-hour episode typically taking one day to record, including read-through and rehearsal. Nicholas Briggs produced the sound, using a combination of synthesised effects from a Roland SH-101 and foley sound effects. Briggs also carried out the studio editing in order to bring the 30-minute episodes down to the 28 minutes mandated by the BBC to allow time for radio trailers between programmes.

== Plot ==
=== Setting ===
Set in the year 2099, the series depicts the Earth as very different from today. Following a number of environmental disasters, such as "the Withering" – which resulted in the loss of a great deal of human knowledge including the vacuum cleaner and fire (although the latter came back fairly quickly) – and a "Cattle-clasm" that killed off most of the livestock, the Earth has been reduced to a wasteland separated between "Withered Zones" and the remaining inhabitable areas. The Withering shifted the Earth into a new orbit, resulting in disruption to the seasons and a reformed calendar. Every day of the week is now 25 hours long except for Thursday (which, due to time anomalies, has not occurred in over a decade), while the change in the length of the year led to the creation of new months such as Janril, Febtober, and Marchuary. In addition, the dreary season of Hamble was created, which is permanently dark, cold and drizzly. The Withering resulted in vegetarians, pigeons and gays becoming endangered species, and completely wiped out tarts.

The Earth's geography is also radically altered. A new mountain range was formed in Britain by a day-long ice age, and the Earth now has twelve and a half continents. Many locations have been displaced and reduced to islands, including Oxford University and the London borough of Deptford, which is now in the Indonesian Ocean as a part of the Cockney Islands. The Solar System is equally altered: Jupiter has been deep fried by Harry Ramsden's, Mercury and Neptune have been knocked together, and there was an initiative to destroy the Moon, which according to the show was deleterious to the nightlight industry.

Religion also exists in the Nebulous universe. Pieced together following the Withering, theologians conclude that there were four true deities: the evil twins Yin and Yang, Feng Shui the destroyer, and merciful Bod, based on the children's television programme Bod, the theme tune of which has become a hymn, sung in Gregorian chant. Bod is analogous to God, hence the commonly used phrase "Oh my Bod!"

=== Storyline ===
Nebulous follows the adventures of the eco-troubleshooting team "KENT" (the Key Environmental Non-Judgmental Taskforce, named after the English county of Kent). The group is directed by Professor Nebulous toward the goal of restoring a natural balance to Earth. However, they are woefully under-funded; KENT was forced to open a laundry to supplement funds. There is at least one other eco-troubleshooting team based in England, but despite their common goals they have a less-than-hospitable view of each other. LOUGHBOROUGH (the Legitimate Organisation Undertaking General Humanitarian Business Operations Requiring Optimum Unconditional Global Harmony, named after the Leicestershire town Loughborough) is run by Professor Nebulous’ ex-love interest, Doctor Erica Flazenby. By comparison to KENT it is over-funded and well-equipped, with bazers, black helicopters and info pills, which provide the user with information by ingestion.

Nebulous both parodies and pays homage to several well known science fiction programmes and films in both its setting and plotlines, often incorporating several different elements within a single story: Professor Nebulous himself is similar to Bernard Quatermass, a British scientist who led a research group and fought aliens in the classic science fiction serial The Quatermass Experiment and its sequels. KENT itself is based partly on the Department of Measurement of Scientific Work, nicknamed "Doomwatch", the eponymous organisation from the BBC science fiction television programme Doomwatch, and partly on the Doctor Who Organization "U.N.I.T", otherwise known as the "United Nations Intelligence Taskforce". The second episode of series one, "The Loverly Invasion", is a direct spoof of the Doctor Who episode "The Claws of Axos", while "The Deptford Wives" takes both its name and premise from The Stepford Wives (and also borrows from Jurassic Park). From the first episode of series 3 onwards, this also began to include the recent Doctor Who spin-off Torchwood and the ITV series Primeval, with references to "baby dinosaurs falling through a hole in time" and "the sheer amount of paranormal activity in the Cardiff area alone ... starting to threaten the Earth's plausibility shield". Episode 6 of that series also parodied the tendency in British sci-fi for attempts to take over the world to start in Britain, with the chief villain (played by Tenth Doctor actor David Tennant) stating "Funnily enough, that's a tax thing," as well as one of the Ninth Doctor's nicknames, "the oncoming storm" (with Nebulous known as "the oncoming drizzle").

== Cast ==
- Mark Gatiss – Professor Boffo Nebulous
- Rosie Cavaliero – Paula Breeze (assistant to Nebulous)
- Graham Duff – Rory Lawson (assistant to Nebulous)
- Paul Putner – Harry Hayes (researcher for KENT)
- Graham Crowden – Ronald Rowlands (Minister with Unusual Portfolio)
- David Warner – Doctor Klench (Nebulous' arch-rival)
- Julia Dalkin – Nebulous's mother, Gemini (KENT's resident supercomputer)
- Matt Wolf – Nebulous's father

Following positive reviews and high listening figures, the second series was able to attract a number of guest appearances from well known actors, including Peter Davison, Steve Coogan, and Kate O'Mara. The third series featured appearances from Julia Davis and David Tennant.

== Reviews ==
Reception to Nebulous was generally positive: a reviewer from The Times described the first series as "a winning blend of Doomwatch, Quatermass and British silliness that has cult written all over it", while the second series was described as "cool and cultish". However, The Daily Telegraph was more guarded, comparing the show to "Hitchhiker's without the philosophy or Red Dwarf without the energy", going on to say that show is "funny, but not seriously so". A reviewer for Doctor Who website UnitNews also initially expressed concerns about the level of jokes in the show, but later claimed "I should have been more patient because when they did arrive, coinciding with the introduction of the character Harry, they were relentlessly funny".
