= Henry Robertson Bowers =

British Royal Navy officer and explorer (1883–1912)

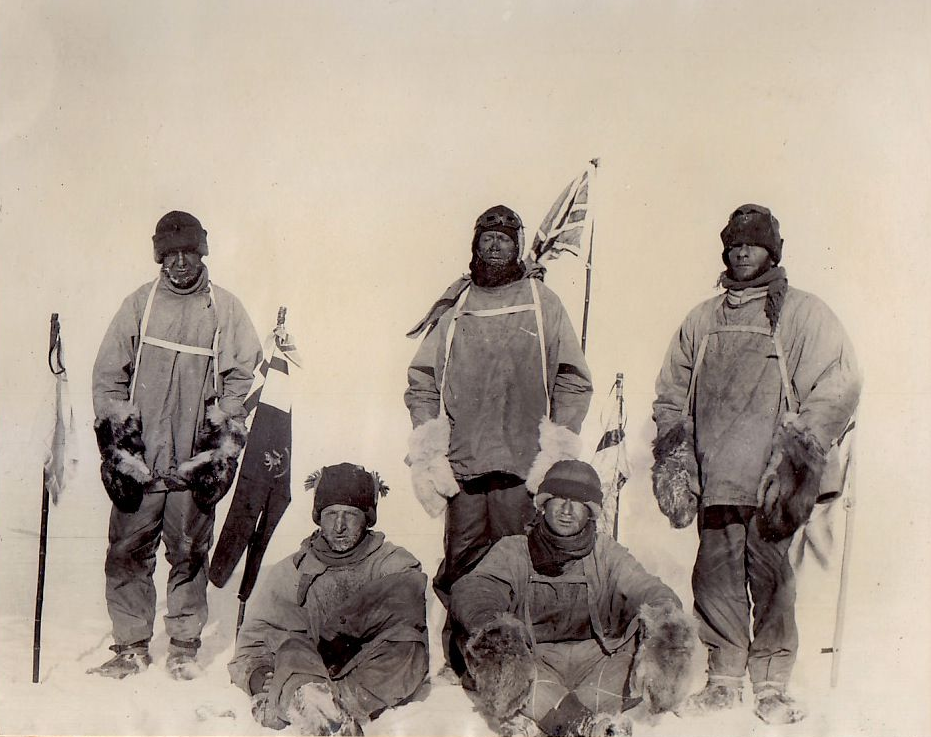
- Bowers (seated, left) at the South Pole, January 1912
- Born: July 29, 1883; Greenock, Scotland
- Died: March 29, 1912 (aged 28); Ross Ice Shelf, Antarctica
- Known for: Part of the Terra Nova expedition

Henry Robertson Bowers (29 July 1883 – c. 29 March 1912) was one of Robert Falcon Scott's polar party on the Terra Nova Expedition of 1910–1913. The team of five reached the South Pole in early 1912, but died on the return journey when extreme weather prevented them from reaching a vital supply depot.

== Early life ==
Bowers was born on 29 July 1883 in Greenock, Scotland. The only son and youngest of three children of Alexander Bowers, a master mariner and businessman, and Emily, née Webb. He was of Scottish descent. After his father died in Rangoon, his mother alone raised him from the age of three with his two older sisters. By January 1896, the family had moved to Streatham, in south London, and lived at 19 Pathfield Road, where Mrs Bowers was still residing in 1899. Whilst living in Streatham, Bowers attended Streatham High School for Boys in Pinfold Road in 1896–7. The building survives today as the Computer Centre behind Streatham Library, on which a plaque was placed by The Streatham Society on 29 March 2012 to commemorate the centenary of his death.

He went to sea first as a cadet in the merchant service, training on HMS Worcester and sailing around the world four times on the Loch Torridon. He then enlisted in the Royal Indian Marine Service in 1905. He was appointed sub-lieutenant, serving in Ceylon and Burma, and commanded a river gunboat on the Irrawaddy. He later served on HMS Fox, preventing gun-running in the Persian Gulf.

== Terra Nova expedition ==
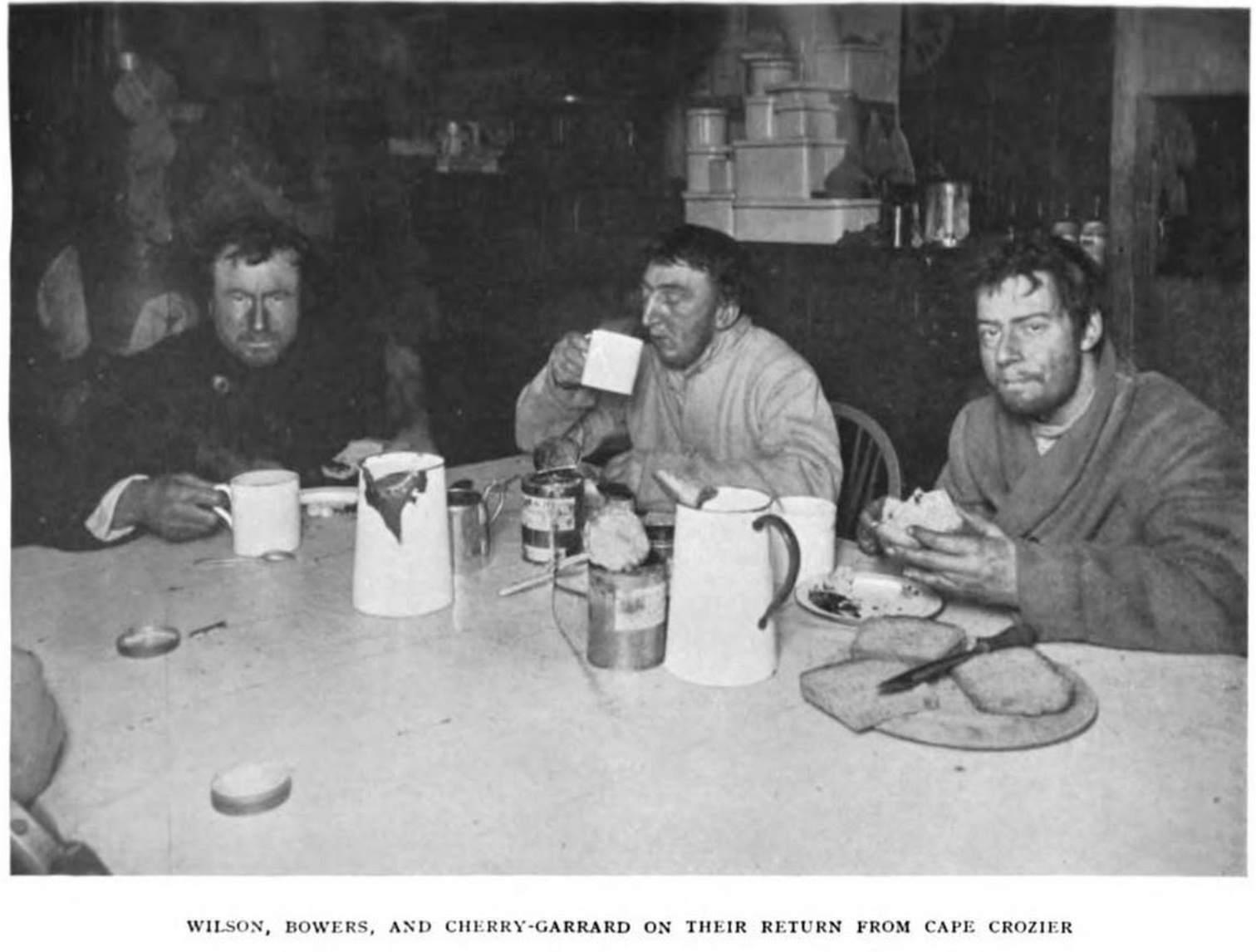
Edward Adrian Wilson, Henry Bowers and Apsley Cherry-Garrard on their return from Cape Crozier.

Bowers joined Robert Falcon Scott's Terra Nova expedition in 1910, after having read the accounts of Scott's earlier Discovery expedition, and of Ernest Shackleton's expedition in Nimrod. He had no previous polar experience but was recommended to Scott by the ex-President of the Royal Geographical Society, Sir Clements Markham, who had been the main organizer of Scott's earlier Discovery expedition. Markham had met Bowers aboard HMS Worcester and had been so impressed with him that Scott invited Bowers to join the expedition without a prior interview. After Bowers fell 19 feet into a hold when loading the ship (someone had carelessly left the cover off), Scott was less impressed by the short, stout young man. "Well, we're landed with him now, and must make the best of it," said Scott, but he soon changed his mind.

Originally appointed as a junior officer of the ship's party in charge of expedition stores, Bowers quickly distinguished himself as an extremely hard-working, highly skilled organiser. By the time the Terra Nova left New Zealand, Scott had promoted him to be a member of the shore party, in charge of landing, stores, navigation and the arrangement of sledging rations, a role in which his extraordinary powers of memory served Scott well. He would pull up a chair to his bunk, stand on it, and use the bunk as a standing desk to work out some of these logistics while his bunkmate slept. During this time, Cherry-Garrard remembers:

Bowers' middle watch especially became famous for the way in which he put the ship at the ice, and more than once Scott was alarmed by the great shock and collisions which were the result: I have seen him hurry up from his cabin to put a stop to it! But Bowers never hurt the ship, and she gallantly responded to the calls made upon her.

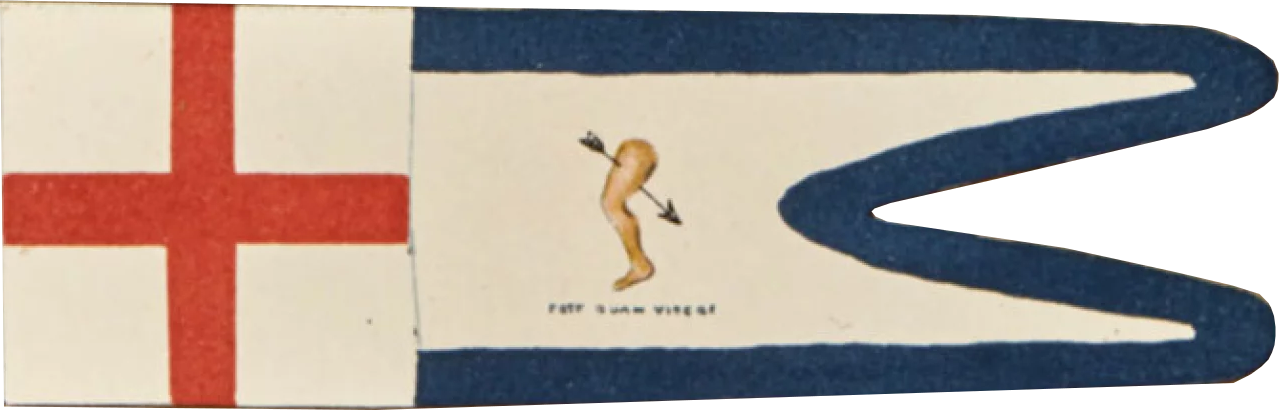
Sledge flag used by Bowers in Antarctica during the Terra Nova Expedition

Six months after arriving in Antarctica, Bowers made the winter journey to the emperor penguin breeding grounds at Cape Crozier in July 1911 with Edward Adrian Wilson and Apsley Cherry-Garrard. The aim of the party was to secure an unhatched egg for scientific study. In almost total darkness and with temperatures ranging from −40 to −70 °F (−40 to −57 °C), they man-hauled their sledge 60 miles (97 km) from Scott's base at Cape Evans to the far side of Ross Island. Frozen and exhausted, they reached their goal, only to be pinned down by a blizzard. Their tent was ripped away and carried off by the wind, leaving the men in their sleeping bags under a thickening drift of snow. When the winds subsided, by great fortune they found their tent lodged about half a mile away in rocks. Having successfully collected three eggs and desperately exhausted, they eventually arrived back at Cape Evans on 1 August 1911, five weeks after setting off. Cherry-Garrard later referred to this trip as The Worst Journey in the World, which became the title of his book published in 1922 recounting the fate of the 1908–1912 expedition.

On 1 November 1911, the long trek to the South Pole began. Scott had not originally planned to include Bowers in his polar party. He had been a member of the sledge team led by Scott's second-in-command, Lieutenant Edward Evans and the last support party to accompany Scott and his team southward, but on 4 January 1912, just as Evans party was about to turn back, Bowers was assigned to the polar party. Some have argued that this seems to have been an impulsive decision by Scott; however, others, such as Antarctic explorer Ranulph Fiennes, have indicated that this was a logical decision – particularly when one intended to increase the speed of a polar land-crossing, in an effort to reduce the consumption of resources.

Only a few days earlier, he had ordered Evans's men to depot their skis, so that Bowers had to travel on foot to the pole while the others were still on skis. In addition, adding a fifth man to the party meant squeezing another person into a tent made for four, and having to split up rations that were packed in units for four men. The most likely motivation for Scott to add Bowers to the polar party was a realisation that he needed another experienced navigator to confirm their position at the South Pole to avoid controversy, such as that surrounding the claims of Frederick Cook and Robert Peary at the North Pole, although why he did not substitute Bowers for another member of the party—most likely Oates—is not clear. To back this theory up, it was Bowers who eventually took the sights to fix the exact location of the geographic South Pole for the Polar party. It was also Bowers who was in charge of the expedition's remaining camera and took most of the famous photographs at the South Pole and at Amundsen's tent.

On 16 January 1912, as Scott's party neared the Pole, it was Bowers who first spotted a black flag left at a camp made by Roald Amundsen's polar party over a month previously. They knew then that they had been beaten in the race to be first to the South Pole. On 18 January, they arrived at the South Pole to find a tent left behind by Amundsen's party at their Polheim camp; inside, a dated note informed them that Amundsen had reached the Pole on 14 December 1911, beating Scott's party by 35 days.

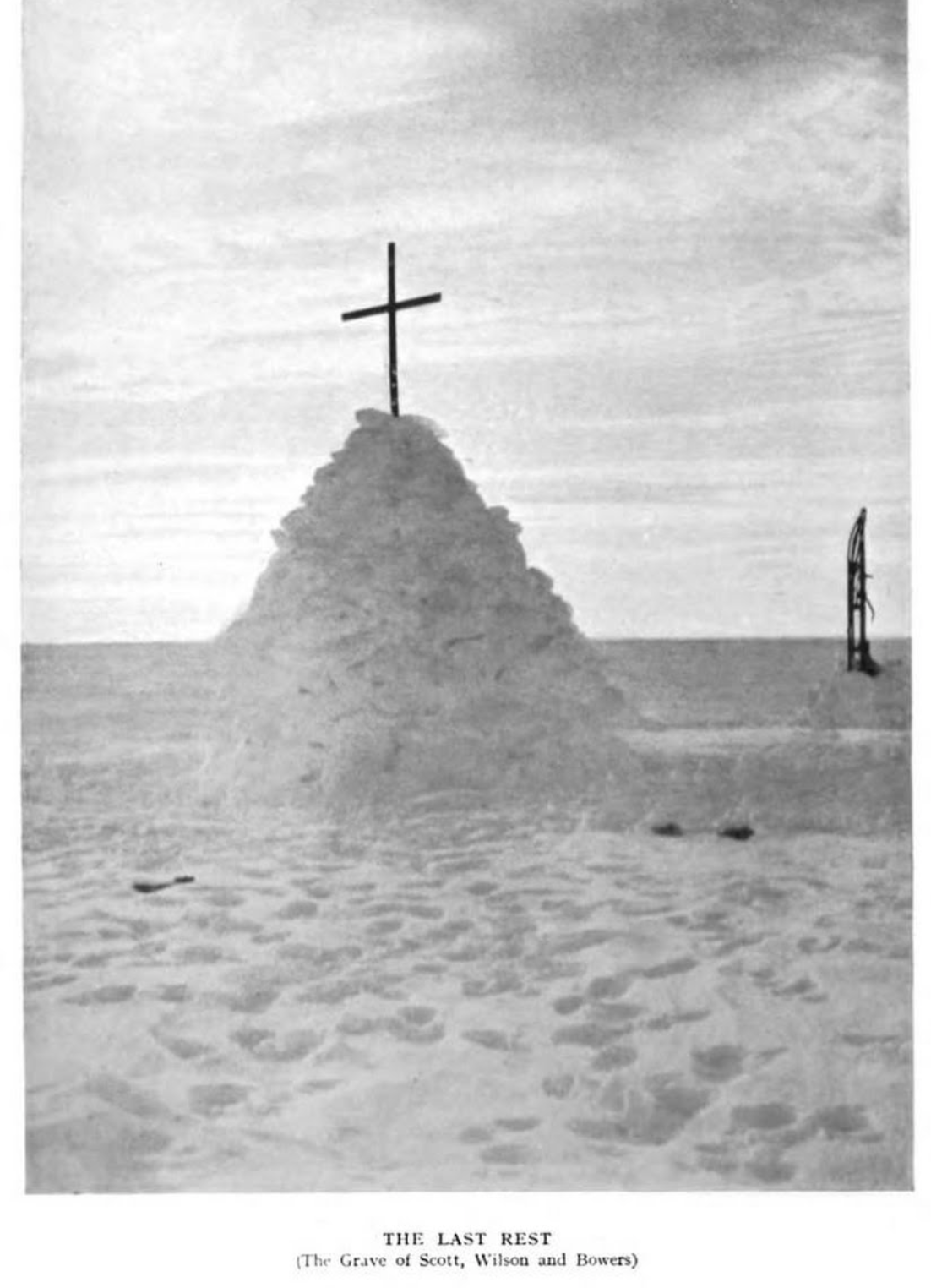
The grave of Edward Adrian Wilson, Henry Bowers and Robert Falcon Scott.

During the return journey, they first made good progress, but P.O. Edgar Evans died on 17 February, presumably of a brain injury after a fall. At the end of February, temperatures fell sharply, the dog relief team failed to show up at the prearranged meeting point on 1 March, and Oates's foot became frostbitten and gangrenous, slowing the party down; in a vain attempt to save his companions, he deliberately walked out of their tent to his death on 16 March. Scott, Bowers, and Wilson continued on for three more days, progressing 20 miles (32 km) more, but were stopped 11 miles (18 km) short of the next food depot by a blizzard on 20 March. The blizzard continued for days, longer than they had fuel and food for. Too weak, cold and hungry to continue, they died in their tent on or soon after 29 March—Scott's last diary entry—148 miles (238 km) from their base camp.

Their bodies were found by a search party the following spring on 12 November 1912. The search party collapsed the tent over them, thus burying them where they lay under a snow cairn topped by a cross made from a pair of skis. Among the items they found and took back with them were the Kodak film rolls with the photographs at the South Pole and geological specimens which later proved the Gondwana theory.

The Bowers Hills in Antarctica, later renamed the Bowers Mountains, were named in his honour.

== Character and nickname ==
Bowers was short, at five-foot four inches, while his chest measurement was 40 inches, and his weight 12 stones. He had red hair and a distinctive beak-like nose that quickly earned him the nickname of "Birdie" among his fellow explorers. He was known for his toughness, dependability, and cheerfulness. Apsley Cherry-Garrard, a fellow expedition member, remarked that "[t]here was nothing subtle about him. He was transparently simple, straightforward, and unselfish. His capacity for work was prodigious".

He was known to work untroubled through any kind of weather, having been to India and then travelled to the Antarctic with Scott without much break in between. Cherry-Garrard's book, The Worst Journey in the World, also included letters from Bowers in which he assures his family he will be "O. K. in any temperature", acknowledging that others had started to wear their Shetland gear and he was still comfortable in his cotton shirts. Also in these letters Bowers expresses his discomfort with the crabs on South Trinidad, describing how they would try to "nibble your boots as you stood — staring hard at you the entire time... no matter how many are in sight they are all looking at you, and they follow step by step with a sickly deliberation. They are all yellow and pink, and next to spiders seem the most loathsome creatures in God's earth." Cherry-Garrard follows this excerpt by adding that Bowers had a horror of spiders.

On his part, Cherry-Garrard described Bowers's character as follows:

"...He was temperamentally one who refused to admit difficulties. Indeed, if he did not actually welcome them he greeted them with scorn, and in scorning went far to master them. Scott believed that difficulties were made to be overcome: Bowers certainly believed that he was the man to overcome them. This self-confidence was based on a very deep and broad religious feeling, and carried conviction with it. The men swore by him both on the ship and ashore. "He's all right," was their judgment of his seamanship, which was admirable. "I like being with Birdie, because I always know where I am," was the remark made to me by an officer one evening as we pitched the tent. We had just been spending some time in picking up a depôt which a less able man might well have missed. As he was one of the two or three greatest friends of my life I find it hard to give the reader a mental picture of Birdie Bowers which will not appear extravagant. There were times when his optimism appeared forced and formal though I believe it was not really so: there were times when I have almost hated him for his infernal cheerfulness. To those accustomed to judge men by the standards of their fashionable and corseted drawing-rooms Bowers appeared crude. "You couldn't kill that man if you took a pole-axe to him," was the comment of a New Zealander at a dance at Christchurch. Such men may be at a discount in conventional life; but give me a snowy ice-floe waving about on the top of a black swell, a ship thrown aback, a sledge-party almost shattered, or one that has just upset their supper on to the floorcloth of the tent (which is much the same thing), and I will lie down and cry for Bowers to come and lead me to food and safety.

In his diary, Scott wrote of Bowers that he is "the hardest traveller that ever undertook a Polar journey, as well as one of the most undaunted". In a letter to Bowers's mother retrieved from the tent containing their bodies, Scott wrote "I write when we are very near the end of our journey, and I am finishing it in company with two gallant, noble gentlemen. One of these is your son. He had come to be one of my closest and soundest friends, and I appreciate his wonderful upright nature, his ability and energy. As the troubles have thickened his dauntless spirit ever shone brighter and he has remained cheerful, hopeful, and indomitable to the end."

== Legacy ==
Bowers's life is celebrated with a small display at Rothesay Museum on the Isle of Bute, near where his mother and sister went to live; he visited them during shore leave and loved walking in the Scottish Highlands. Copies of the photographs Bowers took on the last stages of the South Pole journey were widely exhibited during the centenary of the South Pole expedition and are held at the Scott Polar Research Institute and other archives.

In June 2011, the Royal West of Scotland Amateur Boat Club, based in Bowers' birthplace of Greenock, launched the Birdie Bowers—a rowing skiff regularly used in races throughout Scotland.

== In popular culture ==
Bowers was portrayed by Reginald Beckwith in the 1948 film Scott of the Antarctic, by Sylvester McCoy in the 1985 television serial The Last Place on Earth, and by Lee Ingleby in the 2007 television docudrama The Worst Journey in the World.

== See also ==
- List of solved missing person cases (pre-1950)

== Bibliography ==
- Huntford, R. (1979). The Last Place on Earth. Atheneum. ISBN 0-689-70701-0.
- Fiennes, R. (2003). Captain Scott. Hodder & Stoughton. ISBN 0-340-82697-5.
- Preston, D. (1998). A First-Rate Tragedy: Robert Falcon Scott and the Race to the South Pole. Houghton Mifflin Harcourt. ISBN 0-618-00201-4.
- Scott, R. F. (1983). Scott's Last Expedition. Methuen. ISBN 0-413-52230-X.
- Strathie, A. (2012). Birdie Bowers: Captain Scott's Marvel. History Press. ISBN 9780752460031.
