= The Worst Journey in the World (TV programme) =

- Genre: Docudrama
- Written by: Mark Gatiss
- Directed by: Damon Thomas
- Starring: Mark Gatiss; John Arthur; Lee Ingleby
- Narrated by: Barry Letts
- Composer: Duncan Glasson
- Country of origin: United Kingdom
- Original language: English

Production
- Producer: Suzanne Lavery
- Cinematography: Jonathan Partridge
- Running time: 60 minutes
- Production company: Tiger Aspect Productions

Original release
- Network: BBC Four
- Release: 13 June 2007

The Worst Journey in the World is a 2007 BBC Television docudrama based on the memoir of the same name by polar explorer Apsley Cherry-Garrard. Narrator Barry Letts, best known for his tenure as the producer of Doctor Who, played Cherry-Garrard in the 1948 film Scott of the Antarctic.

== Synopsis ==
A pre-title sequence shows Apsley Cherry-Garrard in London in 1938 struggling with his perceived culpability in Scott's death.

The Edwardian era was called the heroic age of polar exploration and the names of Nansen, Shackleton, Amundsen and Scott have passed into legend. The race for the poles caught the popular imagination, the conquest of the South Pole in particular. Captain Scott emerged as a tragic hero whose story has achieved almost mythical status. What’s less well known is Scott took more than 30 others to Antarctica, where they spent two years conducting extensive scientific experiments, as well as preparing for the attempt on the pole. One of the more esoteric chapters of this adventure is an amazing story of human endurance. It concerns the search for a penguin's egg, and the youngest Englishman in Scott’s party. This is his story...

— Barry Letts's opening narration

Cherry is incapacitated by a psychological collapse in 1946 and starts to flash back to his past. He arrives at the Natural History Museum in 1913 with eggs he collected in Antarctica. He recalls his discussion with Dr. Wilson two years prior when he had first suggested the expedition. Initially denied a place due to his poor eyesight a generous donation to the Terra Nova Expedition had changed Captain Scott's mind and Cherry was signed on.

Scott sets sail from New Zealand and sets up camp at Cape Evans where they settle in for the winter. Dr. Wilson leads Cherry and Birdie on the gruelling 67-mile trek to Cape Crozier where he had discovered an emperor penguin colony in 1902. Constructing a makeshift igloo four miles from the colony the trio collect the eggs. Dr. Wilson is badly burnt while rendering penguin fat for the stove and they lose their tent in a hurricane.

After recovering the tent the trio begin the journey back to the Cape Evans camp. Delivering the eggs to the museum Cherry is summarily dismissed by the curator and the eggs later prove to be too advanced to be of use. Dr. Wilson and Birdie joined Captain Scott on his trek to the South Pole a few months later and perished along with him on the return journey. Cherry sets out on a rescue mission but was forced to turn back by Scott's standing orders not to risk the dogs.

An epilogue, telling of Cherry's mental anguish at failing to rescue his friends who were only 11 miles from One Ton Depot when he turned back, shows the perfectly preserved camp at Cape Evans and the remnants of the igloo at Cape Crozier.

== Cast ==
- Mark Gatiss as Apsley Cherry-Garrard
- John Arthur as Dr. Wilson
- Lee Ingleby as Birdie Bowers
- Julia Dalkin as Angela Turner
- Ian Hallard as Wentworth
- David Ryall as Curator
- Barbara Kirby as Mrs Cherry-Garrard
- Alexander Kirk as Captain Scott
