= Rosie Cavaliero =

British actress

- Born: Rosalind Cecilia Cavaliero, Rio de Janeiro, Brazil
- Education: Manchester University; Webber Douglas Academy of Dramatic Art
- Occupation: Actress
- Years active: 1993–present
- Children: 1 Son

Rosalind Cecilia Cavaliero (born 1967) is a British actress. She has appeared in numerous television roles.

== Early life and education ==
Rosalind Cecilia Cavaliero was born in Rio de Janeiro, Brazil, in 1967, and moved with her family to Manchester, England, when she was still a young child. She attended Manchester University and the Webber Douglas Academy of Dramatic Art.

== Career ==
Cavaliero started her career in television in the 1990s, mainly in comedy, including a stint in French and Saunders. She played the Mancunian character Amy in Cold Feet, and had roles in The Bill and Midsomer Murders. She first appeared on the big screen in Mike Leigh's Vera Drake, taking on the role and dialect of a working-class London woman seeking an abortion in the 1950s. She also works in live theatre, including a role in Mike Leigh’s Abigail’s Party at the Hampstead Theatre.

== Personal life ==
As of 2015 she was living with her landscape designer partner and their son in a village in Wiltshire.

== Filmography ==
=== Film ===
Year	Title	Role	Note
1999	Topsy-Turvy	Miss Moore	
2004	Vera Drake	Married Woman	
2006	Scoop	Pedestrian 1	
2005	Thing to Do Before You're 30	Rosie	
2005	A Cock and Bull Story	Rachel	
2009	Beyond the Pole	Sandra	
2009	Nativity!	Miss Rye	
2011	Jane Eyre	Grace Poole	
2012	Nativity 2: Danger in the Manger!	Miss Rye	
2016	Fist	Laura Mason	Short film
2017	The Children Act	Marina Green	
2017	Breathe	Second Woman	
2017	Double Date	Sandra	
2018	In the Cloud	Sandra Bullington	
2023	Period Drama	Mrs. Fairfield	Short film
2023	Coffee Wars	Mum	
2024	That Christmas	Mrs. Beccles (voice)	

=== Television ===
Year	Title	Role	Notes
1993	The Inspector Alleyn Mysteries	Rose	Episode: "Death in a White Tie"
1995	Medics	Penny Milner, paramedic	Unknown episodes
1995	Coogan's Run	Sally Ordish	Episode: "Natural Born Quizzers"
1995–2001	Casualty	Police woman, Second police officer, Carmel Ramsey	3 episodes
1996–2001	The Bill	Linda Young, Jackie Carter	2 episodes
1996	Kiss and Tell	Maggie Wallace	Television film
1997–2000	Peak Practice	Rachel Adams, Gwenda O'Keefe	2 episodes
1998	Where the Heart Is	Sarah Ponting	Episode: "Fresh"
1999	Cold Feet	Amy	Series 2 regular
2000	The Secret World of Michael Fry	Janine	2 episodes
2001	Best of Both Worlds	Francesca	Regular role
2001	Comedy Lab	Jane	Episode: "Turn the World Down"
2001	Dr Terrible's House Of Horrible	Shop owner	Episode: "And Now the Fearing..."
2001	Red Cap	Maddie Rose	Feature length pilot
2002	Heartbeat	Sandra	Series 12, episode 1
2002	French and Saunders		Special: "Celebrity Christmas Puddings"
2002–2015	Midsomer Murders	Denise Fielding, Judy Tyler	2 episodes
2003	Eyes Down	Christine McMurray	Main role
2004–2006	Green Wing	Teacher, Voice Coach	2 episodes
2005	Peep Show	Vicky	Episode: "Mugging"
2005	Spoons	Various characters	Sketch show
2006	Feel the Force	Sally Frank	Main role
2006–2009	Jam & Jerusalem	Kate Bales	Main cast
2007	Saxondale	Penny	Series 2 regular
2008	Fairy Tales	Kendra	Episode: "The Empress's New Clothes"
2008	Little Dorrit	Mrs Plornish	Main cast
2009	Bellamy's People	Various	5 episodes
2009	Catherine Tate's Nan	Mrs Cratchit	Episode: "Nan's Christmas Carol"
2010	Lark Rise to Candleford	Bessie Mullins	Series 3, episode 10
2010	Any Human Heart	Matron	Episode 4
2010–2016	Mid Morning Matters with Alan Partridge	Rosie Witter	3 episodes
2011	Shameless	Jenny Taylor	Episode: "Takeover"
2011	Life of Riley	Amanda	Episode: "Letter of the Law"
2011	The Crimson Petal and the White	Jennifer Pierce	Episode 4
2011	Spy	Paula	5 episodes
2012	Hunderby	Hesther	Supporting role
2012	Full English	Wendy (voice)	2 episodes
2012–2013	A Young Doctor's notebook	Pelageya	Main cast
2013	Common Ground	Teacher	Pilot episode: "Floyd"
2013	It's Kevin	Various	3 episodes
2013	Quick Cuts	Customer	Pilot episode
2013	Pat & Cabbage	Helen	Main cast
2013	Wizards vs Aliens	Miranda Fisher	2 episodes
2014	Harry & Paul's Story of the 2s	Various	Television film
2014	Lewis	Karen Newman	Episode: "The Lions of Nemea"
2014	Crackanory	Beth Tanner, June Taylor	2 episodes
2014	The Job Lot	Denise Madden	Season 2, episode 6
2014–2024	Inside No. 9	Kirstie, Herself	2 episodes
2014–2015	Prey	DS/DCI Susan Reinhart	Main cast
2015	Banana	Yvonne Burgess	Episode 2
2015	Death in Paradise	Ivy Marcel	Episode: "Until Death Do You Part"
2015	Doc Martin	Melanie	Episode: "It's Good to Talk"
2015	Nurse	Janet, April	3 episodes
2015	An Evening with Harry Enfield & Paul Whitehouse	Mel	Television special
2015	The Enfield Haunting	Peggy Hodgson	Main cast
2015	Professor Branestawm Returns	Mary Oxford	Television film
2016	Call the Midwife	Tessie Anselm	Series 5, episode 8
2017	Unforgotten	Marion Kelsey	Series 2 regular
2017	Paul Tonkinson's Valentine	Rosie	Television short film
2017	Joe Orton Laid Bare		Television film
2018	Urban Myths	Dorothy L. Sayers	Episode: "The Mysterious Case of Agatha Christie"
2018	Friday Night Dinner	Jackie	Episode: "The Other Jackie"
2018	The Guardians		Television film
2018–2019	Hold the Sunset	Wendy	Main cast
2019–2022	Gentleman Jack	Elizabeth Cordingley	Recurring role
2019–2021	Worzel Gummidge	Mrs Braithwaite	Recurring role
2019	Cleaning Up	Frances Howard	Series Regular
2019	Ghosts	Fiona Legge	Episode: "Getting Out"
2020–2022	Code 404	DCS Dennett	Main cast
2021	Friday Night Dinner: 10 Years And A Lovely Bit Of Squirrel	Herself	Documentary special
2022–2024	Funny Woman	Aunty Marie Parker	Supporting cast
2022	The Witchfinder	Mrs. Jennings	2 episodes
2022	Ladhood	Linda Williams	3 episodes
2022	The Love Box in Your Living Room	Various characters	Television film
2022	Christmas Carole	Jackie	Television film
2023	Black Narcissus	Sister Briony	Mini-series
2023	The Power of Parker	Diane	Main cast
2023	Murder, They Hope	Susan	Episode: "Blood Actually: A 'Murder, They Hope' Mystery"
2024	Dead Hot	Bonnie	Recurring role
2024	Toads: Channel 4 Comedy Blap	Janet	Television film
2024	Kaos	Prue	Recurring role
2024	The Cleaner	Marnie AKA P?nk	Episode: "The Reunion"
2025	Mandy	June	Episode: “It’s Not You, It’s Mandy”
2025	Man vs. Baby	Pamela	Episode: "Chapter 1"
2026	Bookish	Mrs Dredge	2 episodes; series 2, episodes 1 & 2

=== Video games ===
Year	Title	Role	Notes
2008	Fable II		Voice role
2010	Fable III		Voice role
2015	Final Fantasy XIV: Heavensward	Dewlala	Voice role

=== Podcasts ===
Year	Title	Role	Notes
2001–2003	Doctor Who: The Monthly Adventures	Cassie Schofield	2 episodes
2017	Doctor Who: The Tenth Doctor Adventures	Marge Ellmore	Episode: "Infamy of the Zaross"

=== Radio ===
Year	Title	Role	Notes
1999	The Public	Juliet	BBC Radio 3, adaptation of Federico García Lorca play
2001	Bayeux Tapestry	Mourner	BBC Radio 3 dramatisation
2001	Doctor Joe Aston Investigates	Grace Hayle	BBC Radio 4
2001	Beyond The Back Of Beyond	Sandra	BBC Radio 4 comedy
2002	Just Plain Gardening	Iris	BBC Radio 4 sitcom
2004	The Don	Receptionist	BBC Radio 3
2005	Cashcows		BBC Radio 4
2005–2008	The Spaceship	Karen Trex	BBC Radio 7 sci-fi comedy
2005–2008	Nebulous	Paula Breeze	BBC Radio 4 sitcom
2006	Giles Wemmbley Hogg Goes Off	Jenny	BBC Radio 4 comedy, World Cup Special episode 2
2008	New Metamorphoses	Shelly	BBC Radio 4, 4 contemporary Ovid, episode: "Phaethon"
2008	I Believe I Have Genius	Charlotte Bronte 2, or Passion	BBC Radio 4 drama
2008	Spike's Lookalikes	Sandie	BBC Radio 4 sitcom
2008	Bad Faith	Denise	BBC Radio 4 spiritual drama
2008	The Day the Planes Came	Sarah	BBC Radio 4 romantic drama
2008	Laura Solon: Talking And Not Talking	Various	BBC Radio 4 comedy sketch series
2008	One Chord Wonders: Parallel Lines	Margaret	BBC Radio 4 drama
2010	Troll	Olivia	BBC Radio 4 sci-fi comedy
2010	Self Storage	Judy	BBC Radio 4 sitcom
2010	iGod	Various	BBC Radio 4 sitcom
2011	Lost Property	Narrator, Ruthie	BBC Radio 4 drama
2011	Down the Line	Various	BBC Radio 4 comedy
2012	Shakespeare's Romeo and Juliet	Nurse	BBC Radio 3 drama
2012	Kevin Eldon Will See You Now	Various	BBC Radio 4 comedy
2012	Beauty Of Britain	Michelle, Lisa, Waitress	BBC Radio 4 sitcom, episode: "Bridezilla"
2013	Cabin Pressure	Caitlin Crieff	BBC Radio 4 sitcom, episode: "Wokingham"
2016	Highlites	Shirl	BBC Radio 4 comedy drama
2017	Inappropriate Relationships	Rachel Collier	BBC Radio 4 psychological drama
2018	Le Maire	Harriet	BBC Radio 2 sitcom
2018	House Rules	Nicole	BBC Radio 4 romance drama
2019	Quiz Nite!	Marina	BBC Radio 4 sitcom, episode: "PTA"
2019	Party's Over	PJ	BBC Radio 4 sitcom, pilot
2019	Bayeux	Wulfgyth	BBC Radio 4 drama
2019	Clare in the Community	Tench	BBC Radio 4 sitcom, episode: "Killing Clare"
2020	Broken English	Anna	BBC Radio 4 crime romance play
2020	Where This Service Will...	Suzie	BBC Radio 4 romance drama
2021	Angst!	Judith	BBC Radio 4 drama, episode: "Plastic"
2021	Date Night	Linda	BBC Radio 4 semi-improvised comedy
2022	The Train at Platform 4	Sam	BBC Radio 4 sitcom
2022	Talking to Chickens	The Doctor	BBC Radio 4 drama
2023	A Room With a View	Charlotte	BBC Radio 4 audiobook
2023	Tess of the Toll Booth	Kel	BBC Radio 4 romance drama
2024	Hopping	Aunt Lil	BBC Radio 4 drama

=== Theatre ===
- Dracula at the Everyman, Cheltenham – Florrie (February 1995)
- Airswimming at the Battersea Arts Centre, London – Persephone (February 1997)
- In Flame at the Bush Theatre, London (January 1999), then transferring to the New Ambassadors Theatre, London (September 2000) – Clara
- Abigail's Party at the Hampstead Theatre (July 2002), then transferring to the New Ambassadors Theatre, London (December 2002) – Angela
- The Anniversary at the Liverpool Playhouse (September 2004) and then transferring to the Garrick Theatre, London (January 2005) – Karen
- Personal Values at the Hampstead Theatre, London (April 2025) – Bea

== Awards ==
The Radio 4 trilogy Lost Property won the '2011 BBC Audio Drama Award' for Best Drama, and Rosie Cavaliero won the Best Actress award for her role as 'Ruthie' in episode 3 Lost Property – A Telegram from the Queen.

The Radio 4 sci-fi comedy play Troll, by Ed Harris, also won the Writers' Guild Award for Best Radio Drama of 2011.
