= Edward Wilson (explorer) =

English polar explorer (1872–1912)

Edward Wilson FZS
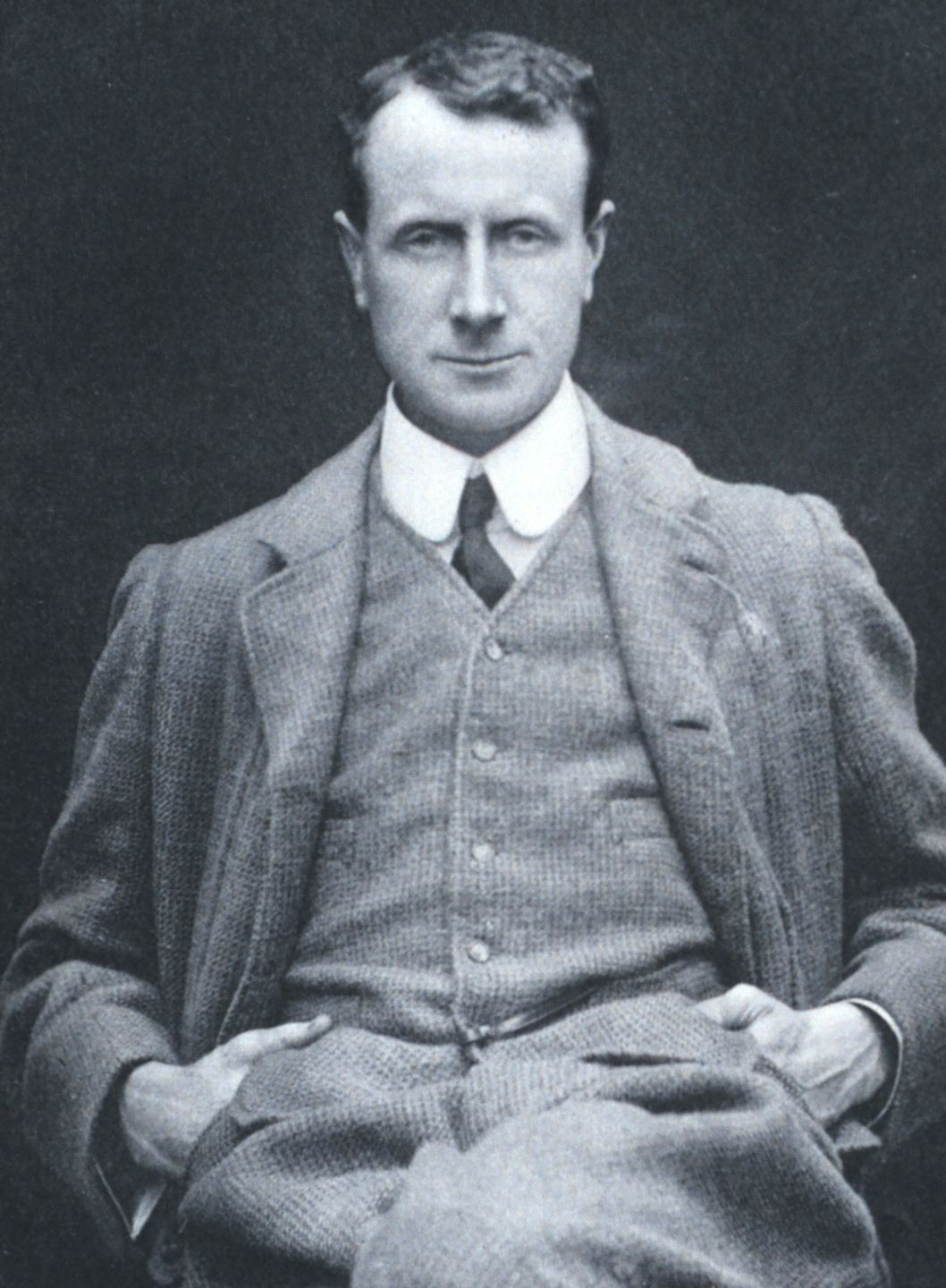
- Born: Edward Adrian Wilson; 23 July 1872; Cheltenham, England
- Died: 29 March 1912 (aged 39); Ross Ice Shelf, Antarctica
- Education: Cheltenham College; Gonville and Caius College; St George's University of London
- Occupations: Polar explorer, ornithologist, natural historian, physician, artist
- Employers: Cheltenham General Hospital
- Expeditions: Discovery expedition; Terra Nova expedition
- Spouse: Oriana Fanny Souper (m. 1901)
- Awards: Royal Geographical Society's Patron's Medal (1913)

Edward Adrian Wilson FZS (23 July 1872 – 29 March 1912) was an English polar explorer, ornithologist, natural historian, physician and artist.

== Early life ==
Born in Cheltenham on 23 July 1872, Wilson was the second son and fifth child of physician Edward Thomas Wilson and his wife, Mary Agnes, née Whishaw. A clever, sensitive, but boisterous boy, he developed a love of the countryside, natural history and drawing from an early age. He was sent as a boarder to a preparatory school in Clifton, Bristol, but after failing to gain a scholarship to public school, he attended Cheltenham College for boys as a day pupil.

His mother was a poultry breeder and he spent much of his youth at The Crippetts farm, Shurdington near Cheltenham. By the age of nine, he had announced to his parents that he was going to become a naturalist. With encouragement and tuition from his father, he started to draw pictures of the wildlife and fauna in the fields around the farm. The Worst Journey in the World explains that "as a boy his father sent him away on rambling holidays, the only condition being that he should return with a certain number of drawings." After passing his exams with honours in science in 1891, he went to Gonville and Caius College, Cambridge, where he read Natural Sciences, obtaining a first-class degree in 1894.

It was during his time there that he developed the deep Christian faith and asceticism by which he lived his life. He studied for his Bachelor of Medicine degree at St George's Hospital Medical School, London and undertook mission work in the slums of Battersea in his spare time. In February 1898, shortly before qualifying as a doctor, Wilson became seriously ill and was diagnosed with pulmonary tuberculosis, contracted during his mission work.

During a long convalescence from this illness he spent months in Norway and Switzerland, time he used to practise and develop his skills as an artist. He qualified in medicine in 1900, and the next year was appointed junior house surgeon at Cheltenham General Hospital.

In 1897, he met Oriana Fanny Souper at Caius House, Battersea, while he was conducting mission work. They married on 16 July 1901, three weeks before setting off for the Antarctic as a member of Robert Falcon Scott's expedition. The wedding was in Hilton, Huntingdonshire, where her father was vicar.

== Antarctica ==
=== Discovery Expedition ===
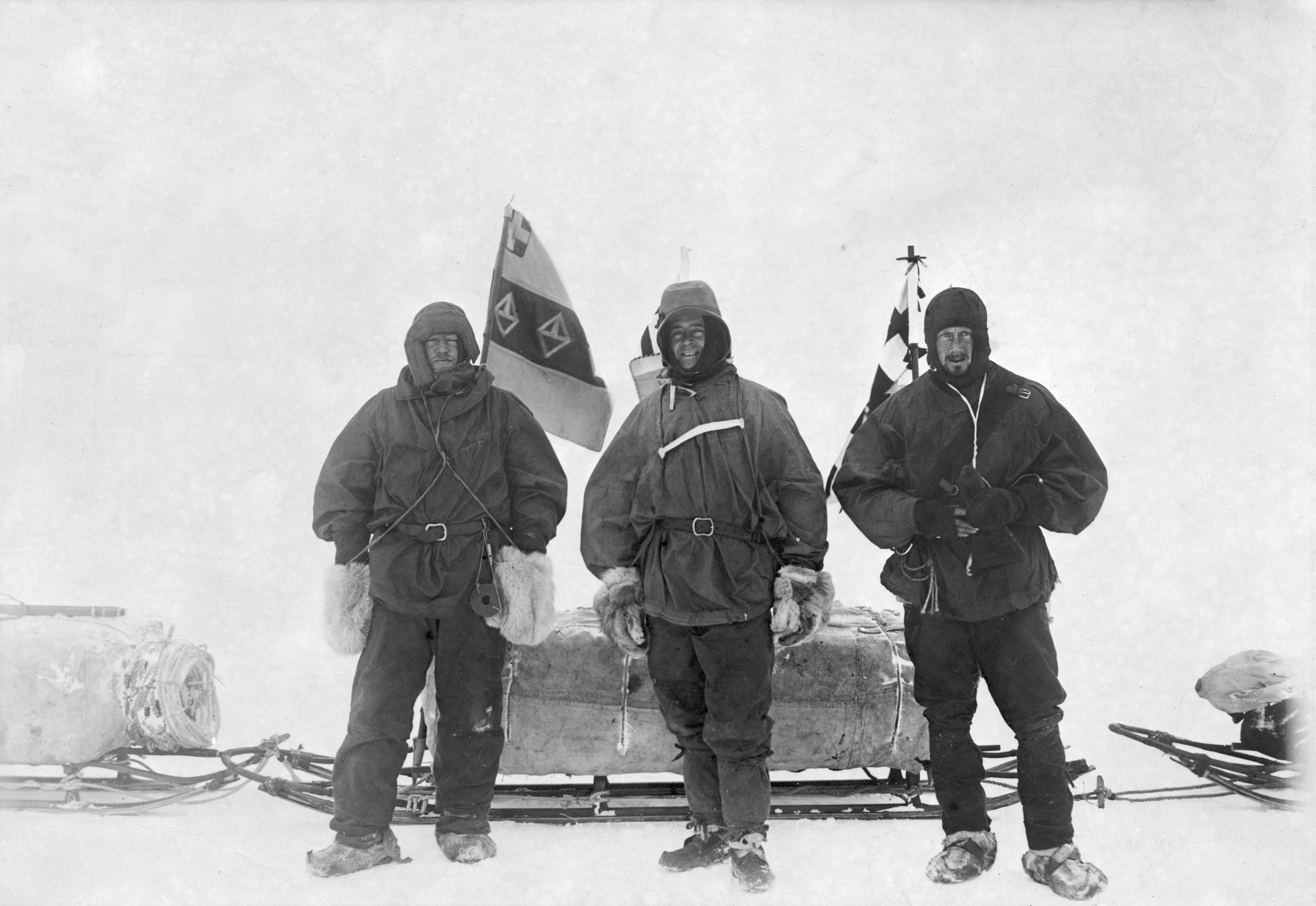
Shackleton, Scott and Wilson, on 2 November 1902

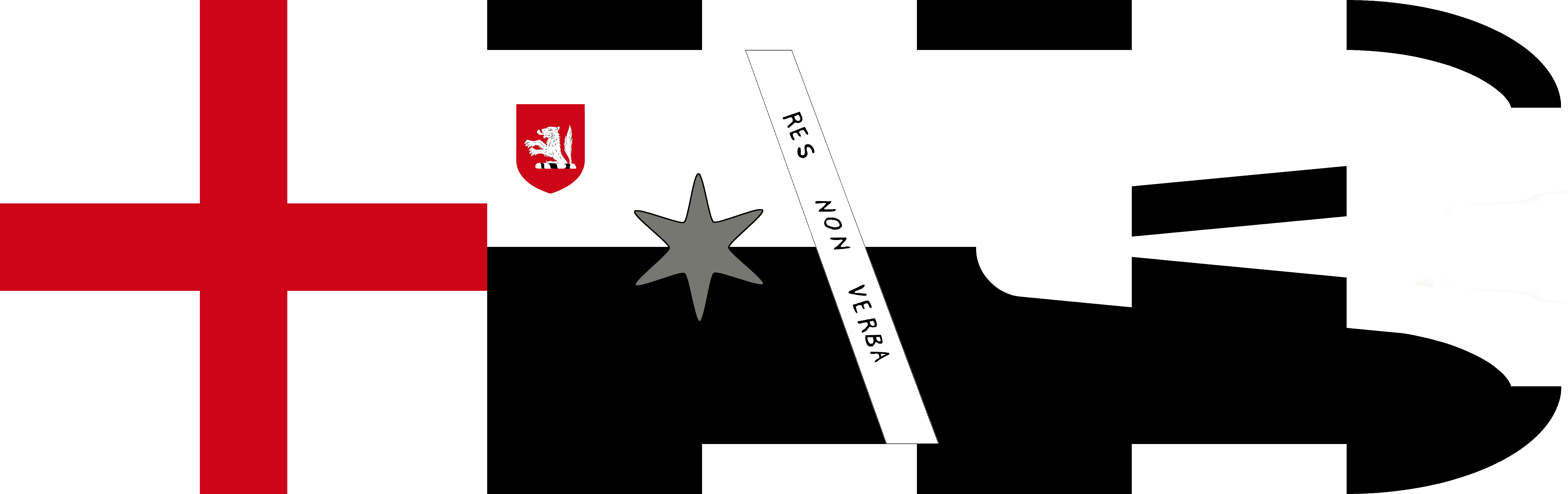
Sledge flag used by Wilson in Antarctica during the Discovery Expedition

From 1901 to 1904, Wilson acted as junior surgeon, zoologist and expedition artist, setting off on the Discovery Expedition on 6 August 1901. They reached Antarctica in January 1902. On 2 November, Wilson, Scott and Ernest Shackleton set off on a journey that, at the time, was the southernmost trek achieved by any explorer. The party had dogs but they were not experienced in using them and the food brought for the dogs had gone bad. With many of the dogs dead, they turned back on 31 December, having reached latitude 82° 17'S. They had travelled 300 miles (480 km) farther south than anyone before them and were only 480 miles (770 km) from the Pole.

Shackleton was deteriorating rapidly, coughing blood and suffering fainting spells and unable to help pull the sledge. Scott and Wilson, themselves suffering, struggled to get the party home. It was a close call. However, 93 days after setting off, having covered 960 miles (1,540 km), they reached the Discovery and safety in February 1903. The following month, Shackleton, having suffered particularly badly from scurvy and exhaustion, was sent home early by Scott on the relief ship Morning.

Cherry-Garrard writes:

Wilson was not a particularly strong man. On leaving with the Discovery he was but lately cured of consumption, yet he went with Scott to his farthest South, and helped to get Shackleton back alive. Shackleton owed his life to those two. Wilson was of a slimmer, more athletic build, a great walker, 5 feet 10½ inches in height, 11 stones in weight, with a chest measurement of 36 inches. He was an ideal example of my contention, which I believe can be proved many times over to be a fact, that it is not strength of body but rather strength of will which carries a man farthest where mind and body are taxed at the same time to their utmost limit.

On his return, Shackleton asked Wilson to join his Nimrod Expedition to Antarctica in 1907 but, partly out of loyalty to Scott, Wilson declined.

=== Terra Nova Expedition ===
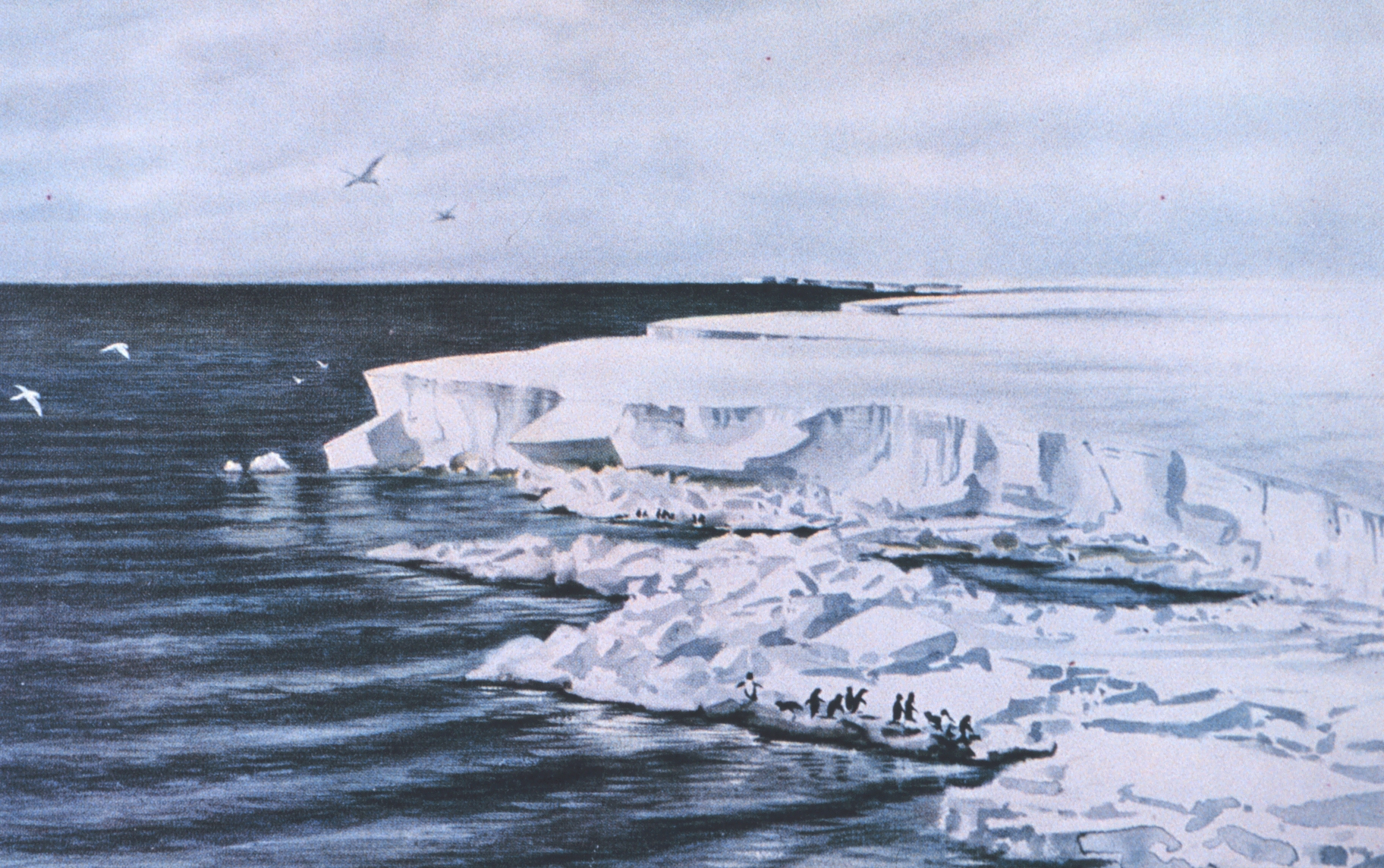
The great ice barrier – looking east from Cape Crozier, 1911 watercolour by Wilson

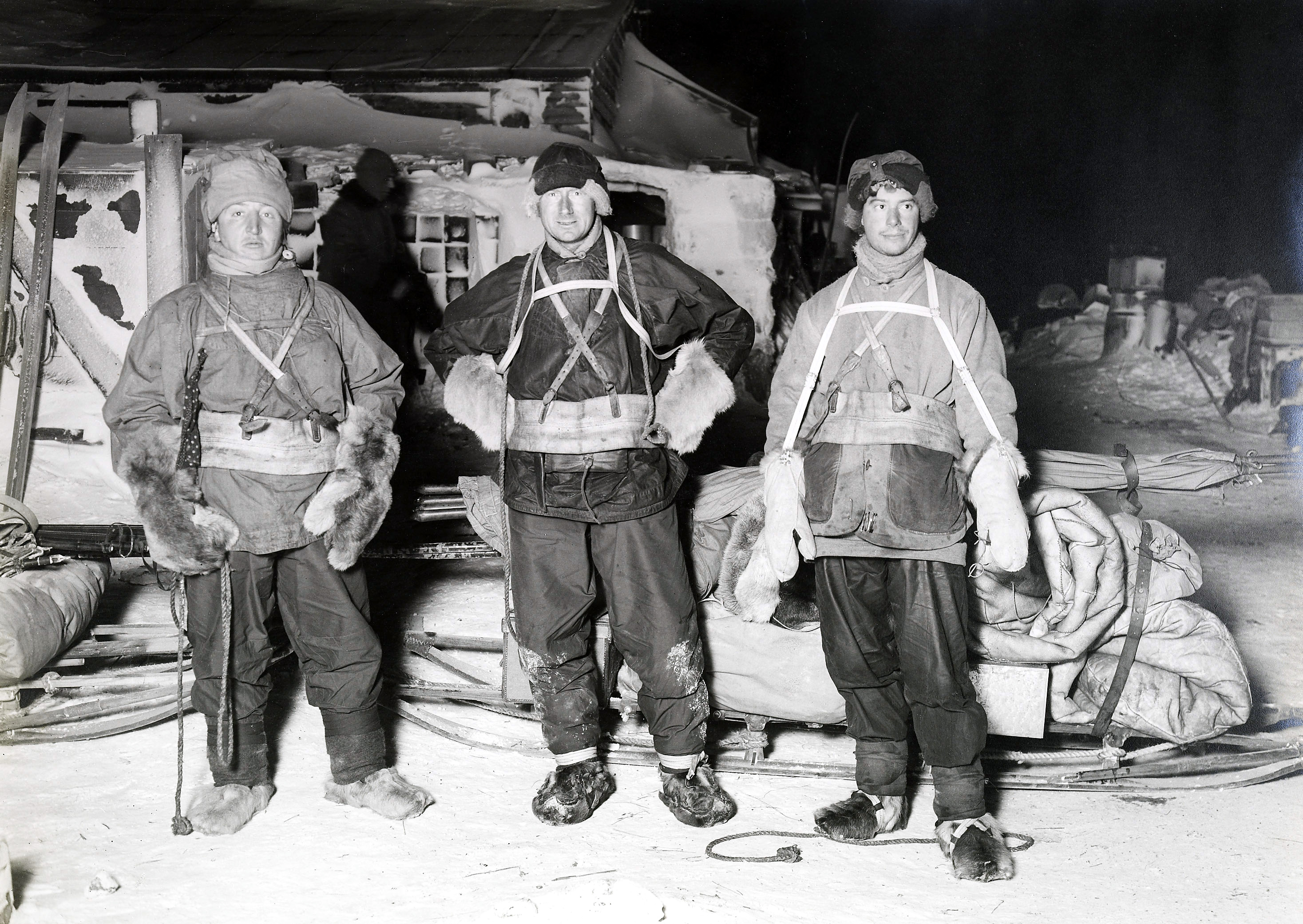
Bowers, Wilson and Cherry-Garrard

On 15 June 1910, Wilson set sail from Cardiff on the Terra Nova, as chief of the scientific staff of Scott's final journey, the Terra Nova Expedition. After making stops in Madeira, South Trinidad, South Africa, Australia and New Zealand, the Terra Nova was trapped for three weeks by pack ice, and finally arrived at Cape Evans in McMurdo Sound in early January 1911. A base camp hut was built and three weeks later work began to establish the supply depots in preparation for the journey to the South Pole the following austral spring. Deteriorating weather conditions and weak, unacclimatised ponies meant that the main supply point, One Ton Depot, was laid 35 miles (56 km) further north of its planned location at 80°S, something that was to prove critical during the return journey from the Pole the following year.

In addition to the drawings of land, pack, icebergs and Barrier, the primary object of which was scientific and geographical, Wilson has left a number of paintings of atmospheric phenomena which are not only scientifically accurate but are also exceedingly beautiful. Of such are the records of auroral displays, parhelions, paraselene, lunar halos, fog bows, irridescent (sic) clouds, refracted images of mountains and mirage generally. If you look at a picture of a parhelion by Wilson not only can you be sure that the mock suns, circles and shafts appeared in the sky as they are shown on paper, but you can also rest assured that the number of degrees between, say, the sun and the outer ring of light were in fact such as he has represented them. You can also be certain in looking at his pictures that if cirrus cloud is shown, then cirrus and not stratus cloud was in the sky: if it is not shown, then the sky was clear. It is accuracy such as this which gives an exceptional value to work viewed from a scientific standpoint. Mention should also be made of the paintings and drawings made constantly by Wilson for the various specialists on the expedition whenever they wished for colour records of their specimens; in this connection the paintings of fish and various parasites are especially valuable.

I am not specially qualified to judge Wilson from the artistic point of view. But if you want accuracy of drawing, truth of colour, and a reproduction of the soft and delicate atmospheric effects which obtain in this part of the world, then you have them here. Whatever may be said of the painting as such, it is undeniable that an artist of this type is of inestimable value to an expedition which is doing scientific and geographical work in a little-known part of the earth.

Wilson himself set a low value on his artistic capacity. We used to discuss what Turner would have produced in a land which offered colour effects of such beauty. If we urged him to try and paint some peculiar effect and he felt that to do so was beyond his powers he made no scruple of saying so. His colour is clear, his brush-work clean: and he handled sledging subjects with the vigour of a professional who knew all there was to be known about a sledging life.

—Excerpt from The Worst Journey in the World by Apsley Cherry-Garrard

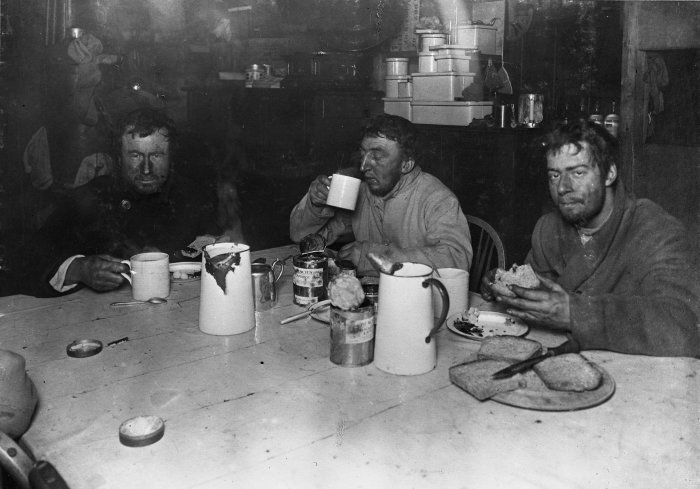
Wilson, Bowers and Cherry-Garrard after their return

Wilson's sledge flag during the Terra Nova Expedition

In the austral winter of 1911, Wilson led the "winter journey", a journey with Henry Robertson Bowers and Apsley Cherry-Garrard, to the emperor penguin breeding grounds at Cape Crozier to collect eggs for scientific study. The 60-mile (97 km) journey was made in almost total darkness, with temperatures reaching as low as −70 °F (−57 °C). At this time, while making a blubber stove, he was hit in the eye with boiling oil. Wilson only mentioned to Scott later, "I was incapacitated for a short time."

Frozen and exhausted, they reached their goal only to be stopped by a blizzard, during which their tent was ripped away and carried off by the wind, leaving the men trapped in their sleeping bags for a day and a half under a thickening drift of snow. Bowers sang to pass the time, and the other two joined in when they could hear him over the wind, occasionally kicking each other through their bags to indicate they were alive. When the winds subsided, by great fortune they found their tent lodged about half a mile away in rocks. Having successfully collected three eggs, and desperately exhausted, they returned to Cape Evans on 1 August 1911, five weeks after setting off. Cherry-Garrard later described this expedition in his memoir, The Worst Journey in the World.

On 1 November, 14 men set off from Cape Evans on the long trip to the South Pole. Seventy-nine days later, Wilson was one of the five-man Polar party that reached the Pole on 18 January 1912, only to find the pole had been claimed by Norwegian Roald Amundsen and his team just five weeks earlier.

Their return journey soon became a desperate affair due to the combination of exhaustion, lack of nutrients in their diet and exceptionally adverse weather. On 17 February, near the base of the Beardmore Glacier, petty officer Edgar Evans died, suspected to be from a brain injury sustained after a fall into a crevasse two weeks earlier. Then, in a vain attempt to save his companions, Captain Lawrence Oates deliberately walked out of their tent to his death on 16 March after his frostbitten feet developed gangrene. Wilson, Scott and Bowers continued on for three more days, progressing an extra 20 miles (32 km), but were stopped by a blizzard on 20 March, 11 miles (18 km) short of the 'One Ton' food depot that could have saved them.

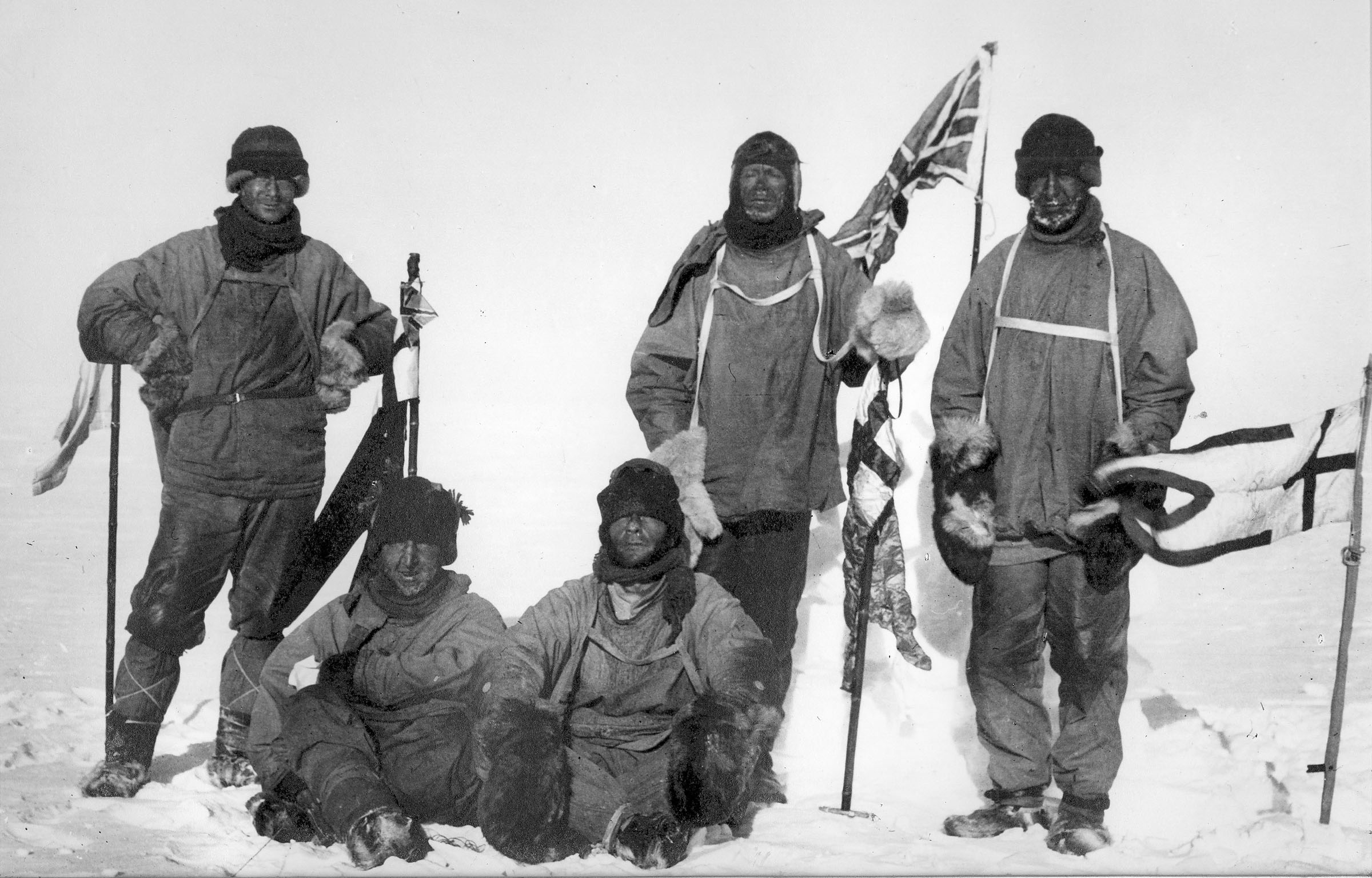
At the South Pole: Wilson, Bowers, Evans, Scott and Oates

The blizzard continued for days, longer than they had fuel and food for. Too weak, cold and hungry to continue, they died in their tent on or soon after 29 March—Scott's last diary entry—still 148 miles (238 km) from their base camp. Their bodies were found by a search party the following spring on 12 November 1912. Their tent was collapsed over them by the search party who then buried them where they lay, under a snow cairn, topped by a cross made from a pair of skis. When news of the tragedy reached Britain in February 1913, they were mourned nationally.

Affectionately nicknamed "Uncle Bill" by the men of the expedition, Wilson was the confidant of many, respected for his judgement, skills at mediation and dedication to others. By all accounts, Wilson was probably Scott's closest comrade of the expedition. Scott wrote, "Words must always fail me when I talk of Bill Wilson. I believe he really is the finest character I ever met." When Scott's final camp was discovered by a search team in November 1912, Bowers and Wilson were found frozen in their sleeping bags. Scott's bag was open and his body partially out of his bag – his left arm was extended across Wilson.

== Legacy ==
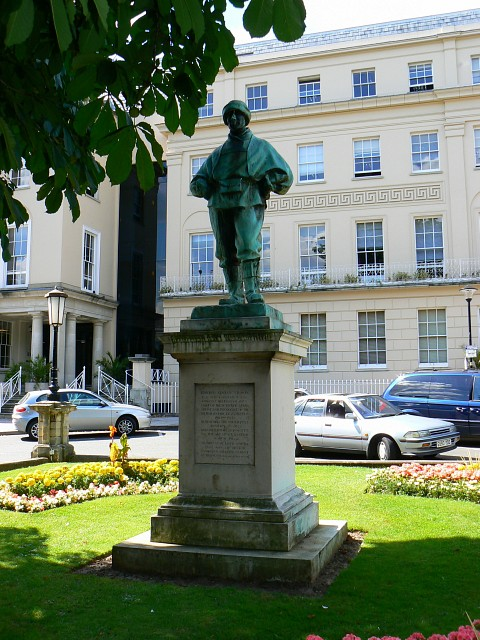
The statue of Wilson in Cheltenham, 2007

In 1913 Wilson was posthumously awarded the Patron's Medal by the Royal Geographical Society for his work in the Antarctic. At Gonville and Caius College, Cambridge, the college flag, which Wilson took to the South Pole, is preserved.

A flag representing Gonville and Caius College, which Wilson took to Antarctica during the Terra Nova Expedition

Wilson's artwork and objects relating to him appear in several museum collections. The largest collection of his artwork is held at the Scott Polar Research Institute, part of the University of Cambridge, which cares for over 200 watercolours of British birds by Wilson, as well as a further 150 paintings made in Antarctica. His watercolours were done quickly by necessity, as the paper would freeze as he worked, and were remembered by members of the Terra Nova expedition as faithful depictions of their journey. His admiration of John Ruskin influenced his work. The institute's Polar Museum displays a range of objects associated with Wilson, including:

- A sledging flag his wife sewed for him was, after his death, first displayed in Gloucester Cathedral, but it is now in the collection of the Scott Polar Research Institute.
- A black flag from Amundsen's South Pole expedition found near the South Pole and brought back by Wilson on the British Antarctic Expedition of 1910–1913.
- A Royal Geographical Society Patron's Medal (George V issue), in a dark blue case, awarded posthumously to Wilson and presented to Mrs Wilson in 1913.
- A candlestick made by Wilson out of a Huntley & Palmers biscuit tin during the British Antarctic Expedition.

The journal kept by Wilson during the South Polar journey on the Terra Nova expedition is held in the British Library, along with Captain Scott's diary from the expedition. The Wilson art gallery and museum in Cheltenham holds a collection of watercolours and drawings made by Wilson, as well as the family papers of his father, Edward Thomas Wilson, who was instrumental in founding the Camera Club, museum, library, a fever hospital, district nursing organisation and clean water provision for the town.

The RRS Discovery in Dundee, the ship Wilson first travelled to Antarctica on, is preserved as a heritage site, and accessible to visitors. The Dundee Heritage Trust collection also includes a small collection of material including a scrapbook and photographs from the Terra Nova expedition.

The statue of Wilson on the Promenade in Cheltenham, modelled by Scott's widow Kathleen Scott, was unveiled on 9 July 1914 by Arctic explorer Sir Clements Markham. In September 2013 the Cheltenham Art Gallery & Museum was renamed 'The Wilson' in his honour. There is a large block of flats named after him in Hesters Way, Cheltenham. One of the houses at Cheltenham College is named Westal, after Wilson's family home on Montpellier Parade, Cheltenham.

There is a blue plaque on the former Caius House in Battersea. The Edward Wilson Primary School in Paddington, London is named after him. The students' café at St George's Hospital Medical School is named Eddie Wilson's.

In the 1948 film Scott of the Antarctic, Wilson was played by Harold Warrender. In the 1985 Central TV serial The Last Place on Earth, Wilson was played by Stephen Moore. In the 2007 BBC Four production The Worst Journey in the World, Wilson was played by John Arthur.

== Bibliography ==
- Wilson, Edward A. (1972). King, H. G. R. (ed.). Edward Wilson: Diary of the 'Terra Nova' Expedition to the Antarctic 1910–1912. London: Blandford Press. ISBN 0713705620.
- Wilson, Edward A. (1967). Roberts, B. (ed.). Edward Wilson's Birds of the Antarctic. London: Blandford Press. ISBN 0713704594.
- Wilson, Edward A. (1966). Savours, Ann (ed.). Diary of the Discovery Expedition to the Antarctic Regions 1901-1904. London: Blandford Press. ISBN 0713704314.
- Seaver, G. (1933). Edward Wilson of the Antarctic: Naturalist and Friend. London: John Murray.
- Seaver, G. (1937). Edward Wilson Nature Lover. London: John Murray.
- Seaver, G. (1948). The Faith of Edward Wilson. London: John Murray.
- Williams, I. (2008). With Scott in the Antarctic: Edward Wilson – explorer, naturalist, artist. Stroud: History Press. ISBN 9780750948791.
- Wilson, D. M.; Elder, D. B. (2000). Cheltenham in Antarctica: the Life of Edward Wilson. Cheltenham: Reardon Publishing. ISBN 9781873877456.
- Wilson, D. M.; Wilson, C. J. (2004). Edward Wilson's Nature Notebooks. Cheltenham: Reardon Publishing. ISBN 9781873877708.
- Wilson, D. M.; Wilson, C. J. (2011). Edward Wilson's Antarctic Notebooks. Cheltenham: Reardon Publishing. ISBN 9781874192510.
