= Ideal (TV series) =

- Ideal title card for Series 6
- Created by: Graham Duff
- Showrunner: Graham Duff
- Written by: Graham Duff
- Starring: Johnny Vegas
- Country of origin: United Kingdom
- Original language: English
- No. of seasons: 7
- No. of episodes: 53 (List of episodes)

Production
- Running time: 28 minutes
- Production company: Baby Cow Productions

Original release
- Network: BBC Three
- Release: 11 January 2005 – 30 June 2011

Ideal is a British dark comedy television series originally broadcast on TV channel BBC Three, created by Graham Duff and produced by BBC Comedy North and Baby Cow Productions. It stars Johnny Vegas as small-time cannabis dealer Moz.

Graham Duff originally planned to play Moz himself, but because of the drug-dealer theme, BBC executives wanted "a better‑known actor playing the lead." Although he was apprehensive at first, when Duff saw Vegas performing stand-up in Brighton, he decided he was "the spirit of the time" and "perfect for the role."

Ideal is set in Salford, Greater Manchester, chosen because Duff was familiar with the area, having done many stand-up gigs there during his youth. Most of the series takes place in Moz's flat and revolves around the eclectic array of characters who visit Moz to buy cannabis, socialise or both. The opening and closing theme is "Song of the Oss" from the album Nuada: Music Inspired By the Film the Wicker Man composed by British band Candidate. The series features a number of tracks by Californian hip hop group Ugly Duckling and Pizzicato Five.

Ideal was broadcast on BBC Three in the UK, on entertainment channel 3e in Ireland and on ABC2 in Australia. First broadcast in 2005, seven series have been shown; the most recent ended on 30 June 2011. After the seventh series, Ideal was cancelled by the BBC. Following the announcement, writer and creator Graham Duff wrote to fans "As some of you may have heard, the BBC have decided against commissioning an 8th series of Ideal. The reason given was that the new channel controller wanted to make a clean sweep. It is a source of both pride and frustration that, at the point of cancellation, Ideal was attracting its biggest ever audiences, its highest profile guest stars and its best ever reviews. And the show is now being screened in more countries than ever before – from America to Finland and beyond".

On 21st July 2025, Johnny Vegas announced on BBC Breakfast that they planned to create a stage show which would cover the 'final' episode they felt they never had chance to film. In addition, he mentioned that previously when the series was on television, Kiefer Sutherland had shown interest in a 'guest' role.

== Characters ==
- Moz (Johnny Vegas): a small-time cannabis dealer who has been dealing for a number of years from his flat in Salford which he used to share with his girlfriend Nicki but later shares with his new girlfriend Jenny. He deals only in the many varieties of marijuana and sees himself as 'providing a crucial service to the community". Moz rarely sets foot outside the front door of his apartment and seems to have no concept of keeping the flat tidy.
- Nicki (Nicola Reynolds): Moz's girlfriend for the first four series. She and Moz have a love/hate relationship, with Nicki constantly nagging Moz about the state of the flat. Nicki can be very assertive and openly opposed to several of Moz's more distinctive shortcomings.
- Cartoon Head aka Golova Sharzh, Russian for Cartoon Head. (James Foster/David Sant) a man who never speaks and always wears a mask resembling a cartoon mouse.
- Craig / Steve (Seymour Leon Mace): the irritating loner Craig was not originally one of Moz's regular clients but after someone has recommended Moz as a good dealer to him, he keeps pestering Moz to let him visit the flat.
- 'Psycho' Paul Nevin (Ryan Pope): originally a rival dealer to Moz, Psycho Paul now works with Cartoon Head.
- PC Phil Collins (Tom Goodman-Hill): Moz's mate and also his chief supplier. Collins is a police constable for the Greater Manchester Police. He supplies Moz with weed which has been seized from other dealers during raids. He is a useful contact for Moz, tipping him off as to what the latest police activity is – information which proves vital when the CID plan to raid the flat.
- Troy (Tony Burgess, also co-writer): Moz's half-brother.
- Kuldip (Ronny Jhutti): a former close friend of Moz. A relatively successful DJ (which Troy resents), he has a regular slot as a DJ at the local nightclub. He often boasts to Moz about the number of white label records he has in his box.
- Judith (Joanna Neary): moves in across the hall from Moz at the start of series two. She is a timid, demure necrophiliac who is constantly saying "sorry". She soon becomes the dealer's potential love interest; they are mutually attracted but he is disgusted at the idea of her having sex with dead bodies.
- Jenny (Sinead Matthews): a dim-witted young adult who becomes Moz's girlfriend near the end of series four.
- Felix (Des O'Malley): the teenage father of Jenny's baby.
- Stemroach (David Bradley): the sinister gangland boss who employs Cartoon Head and Psycho Paul as his henchmen.
- Brian (Graham Duff, who is also creator and writer of the show); a very camp and flamboyant homosexual.
- Colin (Ben Crompton): a bouncy, childlike petty criminal who is usually on probation, as he frequently reminds people.
- Carmel (Hanne Steen): a Spanish escort.
- Sangita (Sunetra Sarker): Nicki’s best friend and, for a short period, lover.
- Yasuko (Haruka Kuroda): a bubbly and naive Japanese woman with a cleaning compulsion.
- Derrick (Alfie Joey): another regular customer whose obsession with vegetables Moz finds very boring.
- China (Natalie Gumede): along with her friend Asia, is one of Moz's regular clients.
- Asia (Rebecca Atkinson): friend of China's, who finds Moz repulsive.
- Silicone Valets (pronounced "Silicone Valleys"): Lee (Andrew-Lee Potts) and Jason together are Silicone Valets, a pop group of indeterminate quality and style, who drop by to buy drugs and brag about their success.

- Jason (Tim Fallows): a member of the same boy band as Lee.

- Kim and Miko (Jessica Peh and Haruka Abe): Friends of Yasuko who are members of a Japanese girl band.
- Tanya (Emma Fryer): Colin's sister and also baby Sanjeev's health visitor.
- Alan (Peter Slater): the foreman of the builders who renovate Moz's flat after the fire.
- Marco (Andrew Lawrence): Alan's assistant builder.
- Reverend Jeff "Fist" Fistwick (Graham Duff; uncredited and in a mask): His flat is usually dark and unlit and Fist seems to spend a lot of time watching people come and go, seemingly with sinister intent.
- Chen (Hon Ping Tan): a member of the Low Triad, initially working for Min Yin Low.
- Tony (Dan Li): also a member of the Low Triad, initially working for Min Yin Low.
- Keith (Mick Miller): Moz's long lost stepfather.
- Xavier (Michael Kofi): a member of Psycho Paul's gang. He is infatuated by how comfortable one of Moz's chairs is.
- Dawn (Julia Davis): Jenny's mum who has cataracts.
- Jake/Dinos (Dylan Edwards) & (Sam Fletcher): Conjoined Twins.
- Carol (Jo Enright): Keith's blind girlfriend.
- Tilly (Janeane Garofalo): Moz's new neighbour in flat 6.
- Mr. Rupani (Vincent Ebrahim): Moz's landlord, as well as the landlord of the other flats in the block.
- Jess (Elinor Crawley): Nicki's sister/daughter.
- Amanda with the weird eyes: An unseen character (save for one scene in the final episode of series one, in which she is only seen from the back).

== Guest stars ==
Guest stars have included Graham Fellows (as Dr Persil), Sean Lock (as Natalie/Nathaniel, Brian's transgender partner), Mark Radcliffe, Jason Manford (as Jack), Mark E Smith (as Jesus Christ), Paul Weller, Kara Tointon, Barry Adamson (as Brian's hitman boyfriend), Alan Yentob (as himself) and Rula Lenska (as the Red King).

== Series overview ==
Series	Episodes	Originally released	
Series	Episodes	First released	Last released
1	9	11 January 2005	27 December 2005
2	8	14 March 2006	2 May 2006
3	8	20 March 2007	8 May 2007
4	8	28 April 2008	16 June 2008
5	6	11 May 2009	15 June 2009
6	8	17 August 2010	5 October 2010
7	6	26 May 2011	30 June 2011

== Episodes ==
Each series of Ideal has a different coloured title sequence. Series 1 was sepia; the Christmas special was red; Series 2 was blue; Series 3 was green; Series 4 was purple; Series 5 was red; Series 6 was yellow and Series 7 is bondi blue.

=== Series 1 (2005) ===
No. overall	No. in series	Title	Written by	Original release date
1	1	"The Rat"	Graham Duff	11 January 2005
2	2	"The Seduction"	Graham Duff	18 January 2005
3	3	"The Boyfriend"	Graham Duff	25 January 2005
4	4	"The Affair"	Graham Duff	1 February 2005
5	5	"The Backpacker"	Graham Duff	8 February 2005
6	6	"The Party"	Graham Duff	15 February 2005
7	7	"The Pregnancy"	Graham Duff	22 February 2005
8	8	"The Body"	Graham Duff	1 March 2005

=== Special ===
No. overall	No. in series	Title	Written by	Original release date
9	-	"An Ideal Xmas"	Graham Duff	27 December 2005

=== Series 2 (2006) ===
No. overall	No. in series	Title	Written by	Original release date
10	1	"The Stag Do"	Graham Duff	14 March 2006
11	2	"The Landlord"	Graham Duff	21 March 2006
12	3	"The Hydroponics"	Graham Duff	28 March 2006
13	4	"The Séance"	Graham Duff	4 April 2006
14	5	"The Boss"	Graham Duff	11 April 2006
15	6	"The Guest"	Graham Duff	18 April 2006
16	7	"The Delivery"	Graham Duff	25 April 2006
17	8	"The Money"	Graham Duff	2 May 2006

=== Series 3 (2007) ===
No. overall	No. in series	Title	Written by	Original release date
18	1	"The Night"	Graham Duff	20 March 2007
19	2	"The Christians"	Graham Duff	27 March 2007
20	3	"The Pyramid"	Graham Duff	3 April 2007
21	4	"The Nest"	Graham Duff	10 April 2007
22	5	"The Bath"	Graham Duff	17 April 2007
23	6	"The Set-Up"	Graham Duff	24 April 2007
24	7	"The Crabs"	Graham Duff	1 May 2007
25	8	"The Wedding"	Graham Duff	8 May 2007

=== Series 4 (2008) ===
No. overall	No. in series	Title	Written by	Original release date
26	1	"The Pains"	Graham Duff	28 April 2008
27	2	"The Past"	Graham Duff	5 May 2008
28	3	"The Vodka"	Graham Duff	12 May 2008
29	4	"The Secret"	Graham Duff	19 May 2008
30	5	"The War"	Graham Duff	26 May 2008
31	6	"The Birthday"	Graham Duff	2 June 2008
32	7	"The Television"	Graham Duff	9 June 2008
33	8	"The Future"	Graham Duff	16 June 2008

=== Series 5 (2009) ===
No. overall	No. in series	Title	Written by	Original release date
34	1	"The Healer"	Graham Duff	11 May 2009
35	2	"The Temptation"	Graham Duff	18 May 2009
36	3	"The Red Bag"	Graham Duff	25 May 2009
37	4	"The Documentary"	Graham Duff	1 June 2009
38	5	"The Chance"	Graham Duff	8 June 2009
39	6	"The Passports"	Graham Duff	15 June 2009

=== Series 6 (2010) ===
No. overall	No. in series	Title	Written by	Original release date
40	1	"The Business"	Graham Duff	17 August 2010
41	2	"The American"	Graham Duff	24 August 2010
42	3	"The Kill"	Graham Duff	31 August 2010
43	4	"The Poster"	Graham Duff	7 September 2010
44	5	"The Lapse"	Graham Duff	14 September 2010
45	6	"The Accident"	Graham Duff	21 September 2010
46	7	"The Ear"	Graham Duff	28 September 2010
47	8	"The Housewarming"	Graham Duff	5 October 2010

=== Series 7 (2011) ===
No. overall	No. in series	Title	Written by	Original release date
48	1	"The Police"	Graham Duff	26 May 2011
49	2	"The Debtors"	Graham Duff	2 June 2011
50	3	"The Brothel"	Graham Duff	9 June 2011
51	4	"The Paintings"	Graham Duff	16 June 2011
52	5	"The Love"	Graham Duff	23 June 2011
53	6	"The Red King"	Graham Duff	30 June 2011

== Awards and nominations ==
In November 2006, Ideal received the award for Best Comedy Programme at the Royal Television Society North West Comedy Awards.

== DVD release ==
A box set of series one (excluding the Christmas special episode) was released in the UK on 7 November 2005. It includes the following extras:

- Making of Ideal
- Out-takes
- Deleted scenes
- Commentaries from Johnny Vegas (Moz), Graham Duff (creator, writer, Brian and Reverend Fistwick) and Henry Normal (executive producer).

The second series (including the Christmas special) was released on DVD on 19 February 2007, the third series on 9 June 2008, the fourth series on 13 April 2009, and the fifth series on 19 July 2010. The sixth series was released on 11 October 2010. The seventh and final series was released on 25 July 2011.

== Film ==
A film based on the TV series was planned. The last update was this in June 2012. Baby Cow executive Henry Normal told Chortle: "It's going to be set in the same place, with many of the same characters. We even bought the physical set from the BBC, our co-producers on the TV series. We are aiming for it to be quite a dark psychological comedy-thriller". As of 2025, there has been no word of the film being in production.

== Stage adaptation ==
In 2025, some of the main cast reunited for a stage adaptation of the show that toured the UK. Characters included Johnny Vegas (Moz), Ben Crompton (Colin), Joanna Neary (Judith), Ryan Pope (Psycho Paul), and Emma Fryer (Tania). The play maintained the dark humour of the TV series and was set in Moz's flat.
