= Julia Dalkin =

British actress

Julia Dalkin (born 1975) is a British actress.

== Partial filmography ==
- Nebulous (radio) (2005–2008)
- EastEnders - Polly (2009), DC Brook Penrith (2013)
- Doctors - Suzanne Matthews (1 episode, 2008)
- The Worst Journey in the World (2007) (TV) - Angela Turner
- Holby City - Nikki Taylor (1 episode, 2006)
- A Touch of Frost - DC Bennett (1 episode, 2005)
- Global Conspiracy (2004) - Janet
- Wire in the Blood - Librarian (1 episode, 2003)
- The Bill - Christine Nelmes (1 episode, 2002)
- Outside the Rules (2002) (TV) - Linda Bloor
- Life Support - Sharon Richards (1 episode, 1999)
- Phantasmagoria - Hannah Fry (radio)
- Inspector Morse - Rachel James (1 episode, Death Is Now My Neighbour, 1997)
