= Apsley Cherry-Garrard =

English polar explorer (1886–1959)

Cherry-Garrard
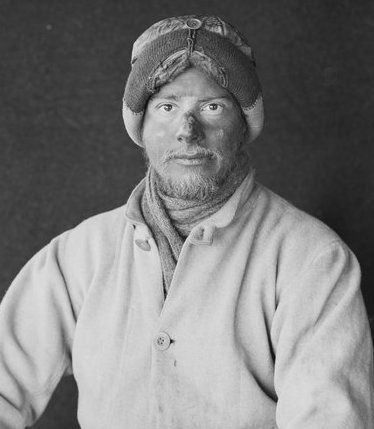
- Cherry-Garrard in January 1912
- Born: Apsley George Benet Cherry; 2 January 1886; Bedford, Bedfordshire, England
- Died: 18 May 1959 (aged 73); Piccadilly, Westminster, England
- Education: Winchester College; Christ Church, Oxford
- Occupations: Zoologist, explorer, author
- Notable work: The Worst Journey in the World (1922)
- Military career
- Allegiance: United Kingdom
- Branch: Royal Naval Reserve
- Service years: 1914–1916
- Wars: World War I

Apsley George Benet Cherry-Garrard (2 January 1886 – 18 May 1959) was an English explorer of Antarctica. He was a member of the Terra Nova expedition and is acclaimed for his 1922 account of this expedition, The Worst Journey in the World.

== Early life ==
Born in Bedford, as Apsley George Benet Cherry, the eldest child of Apsley Cherry of Denford Park and his wife, Evelyn Edith (née Sharpin), daughter of Henry Wilson Sharpin of Bedford. He was educated at Winchester College and at Christ Church, Oxford where he read classics and modern history. While at Oxford, he rowed in the 1908 Christ Church crew which won the Grand Challenge Cup at the Henley Royal Regatta.

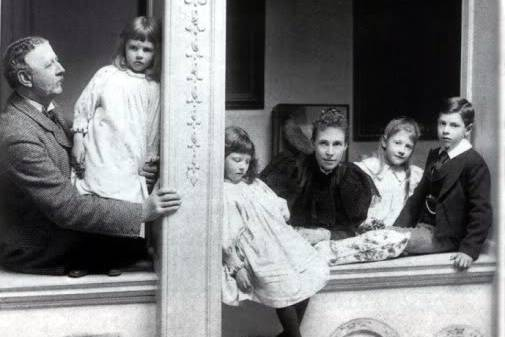
The Cherry-Garrard family with Apsley on the right

His surname was changed to Cherry-Garrard by the terms of his great-aunt's will, through which his father inherited the Lamer Park estate near Wheathampstead, Hertfordshire. Apsley inherited the estate on his father's death in 1907.

Cherry-Garrard had always been enamoured of the stories of his father's achievements in India and China where he had fought with merit for the British Army, and felt that he must live up to his father's example. In September 1907, Edward Adrian Wilson met with Robert Falcon Scott at Reginald Smith's home in Cortachy, to discuss another Antarctic expedition; Smith's young cousin Apsley Cherry-Garrard happened to visit and decided to volunteer.

== Antarctica ==
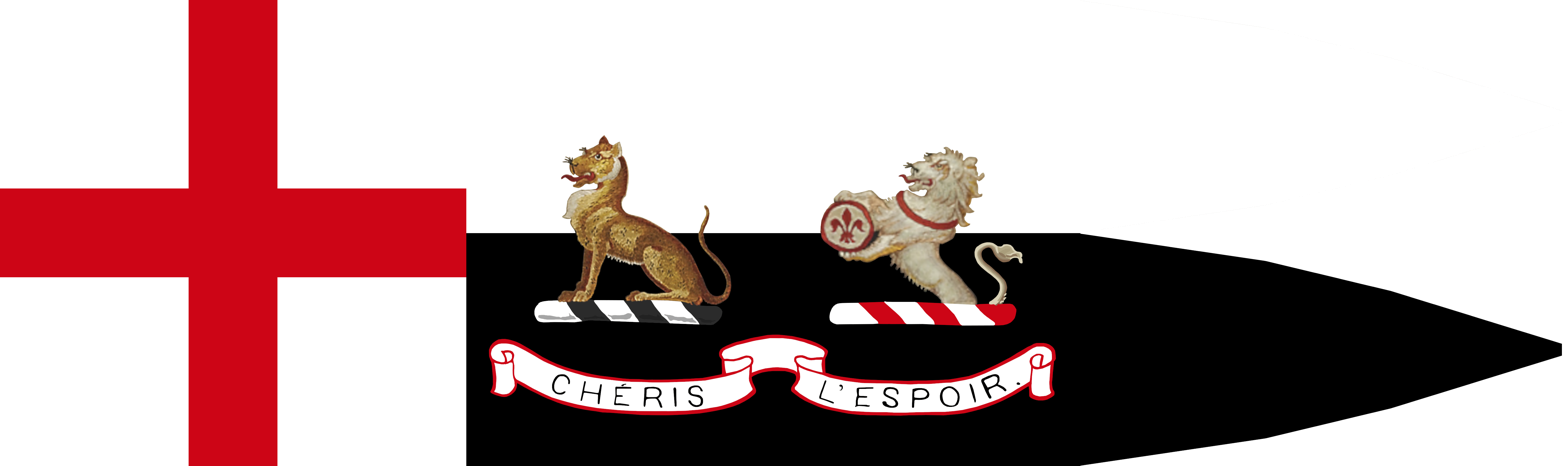
Sledge flag used by Cherry-Garrard in Antarctica during the Terra Nova Expedition

At the age of 24, 'Cherry' was one of the youngest members of the Terra Nova expedition. This was Scott's second and last expedition to Antarctica. Cherry's application to join the expedition was initially rejected as Scott was looking for scientists, but he made a second application along with a promise of £1,000 (equivalent to £102,000 in 2025) towards the cost of the expedition.

Rejected a second time, he made the donation regardless. Struck by this gesture, and at the same time persuaded by Edward Adrian Wilson, Scott agreed to take Cherry-Garrard as assistant zoologist. The expedition arrived in the Antarctic on 4 January 1911. During the remainder of the southern summer, from January to March, Cherry-Garrard helped lay depots of fuel and food on the intended route of the party which would attempt to reach the South Pole.

=== Winter journey ===
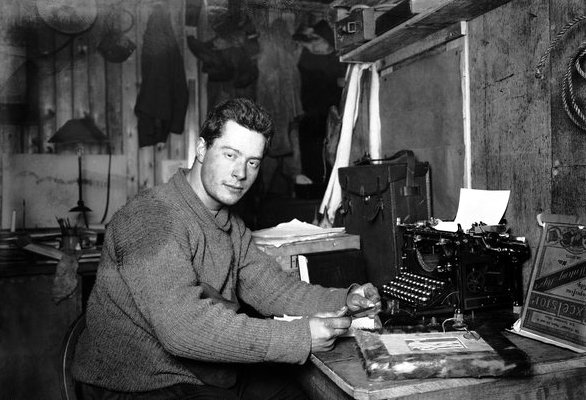
Cherry-Garrard in Scott's Hut at Cape Evans, 30 August 1911

With Wilson and Henry Robertson Bowers, Cherry-Garrard made a trip to Cape Crozier on Ross Island in July 1911 during the austral winter in order to secure an unhatched emperor penguin egg to hopefully help scientists prove the evolutionary link between all birds and their reptile predecessors by analysis of the embryo. Cherry-Garrard suffered from a high degree of myopia, seeing little without the spectacles that he could not wear while sledging.

In almost total darkness, and with temperatures ranging from −40 to −77.5 °F (−40.0 to −60.8 °C), they man-hauled their sledge 60 miles (100 km) from Scott's base at Cape Evans to the far side of Ross Island. The party had two sledges, but the poor surface of the ice due to the extremely low temperatures meant that they could not drag both sledges as intended during parts of the outward journey. They were thus forced to relay, moving one sledge a certain distance before returning for the other. This highly inefficient means of travelling – walking three miles (4.8 km) for every one advanced – meant at times they could only travel a couple of miles each day.

Frozen and exhausted, they reached their destination in 19 days and built an improvised rock wall igloo with canvas roof on the slopes of Mount Terror just a few miles from the penguin colony at Cape Crozier. They managed to collect three penguin eggs intact before a force eleven blizzard struck on 22 July, ripping their tent away and carrying it off in the wind. The igloo roof lasted one more day before it too was ripped away by the wind, leaving the men in their sleeping bags under a thickening drift of snow, singing songs and hymns above the sounds of the storm to keep their spirits up.

When the winds subsided on 24 July, by great fortune they found their tent lodged in a hollow drift at the bottom of a steep slope half a mile away. Cherry-Garrard suffered such cold that he shattered most of his teeth due to chattering in the frigid temperatures. Desperately exhausted by the cold and lack of sleep, they left anything they didn't need behind and began their return journey. Only progressing a mile and a half some days, they eventually arrived back at Cape Evans shortly before midnight on 1 August. Cherry-Garrard later referred to this as the 'worst journey in the world' and, at the suggestion of his neighbour George Bernard Shaw, gave this title to his book recounting the fate of the 1910–1913 expedition.

=== Polar journey ===
On 1 November 1911, Cherry-Garrard set off to accompany the team that would make the attempt on the South Pole, along with three supporting parties of men, dogs and horses. At the foot of the Beardmore Glacier, the horses were shot and their flesh cached for food, while the dog teams turned back for base. At the top of the Beardmore Glacier, on 22 December, Cherry-Garrard was in the second supporting party to be sent home, arriving back at base on 26 January 1912.

=== One Ton Depot ===
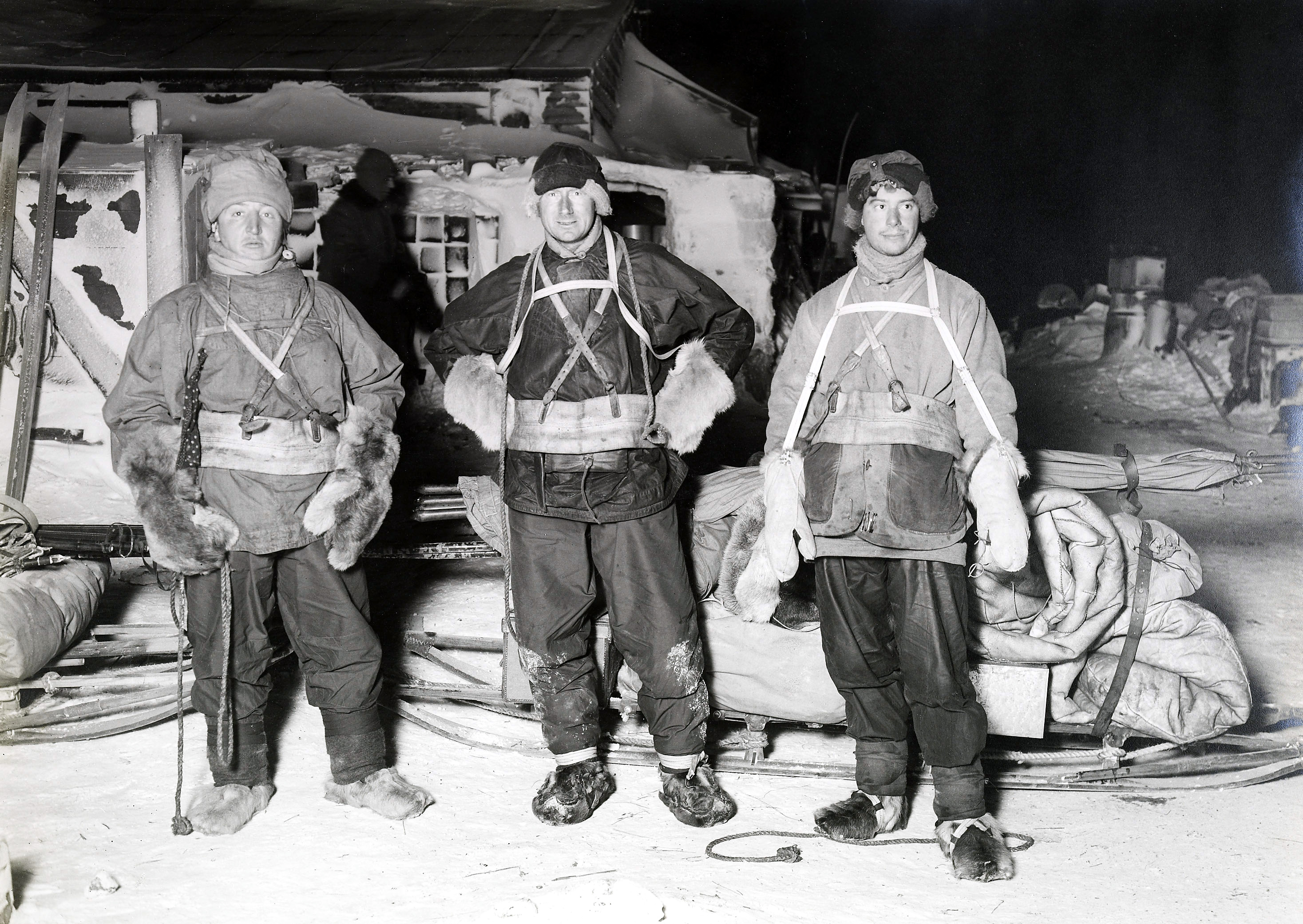
Bowers, Wilson and Cherry-Garrard

Scott had left orders for dog-driver Meares and surgeon Edward L. Atkinson to take the dog teams south in early February 1912 to meet Scott's party on 1 March at latitude 82° or 82°30′S, and to assist his return journey. As Cecil Meares was not available for work, Atkinson had to attend to a medical emergency, and George Simpson was busy, the fateful choice fell on Cherry-Garrard. Belatedly, on 26 February 1912, Cherry-Garrard and dog handler Dimitri Gerov set off southwards and soon reached One Ton Depot on 3 March, and deposited additional food.

They waited there seven days hoping to meet the South Pole team. Cherry-Garrard and Dimitri then turned back on 10 March. Scott's party was at that time only 55 miles (89 km), i.e. three dog marches south of One Ton Depot. Scott and his companions eventually reached a point 11 miles (18 km) south of One Ton Depot, where they starved or froze to death. Cherry-Garrard later wrote that "the primary object of this journey with the dog team[s] was to hurry Scott and his companions home" but they "were never meant to be a relief journey".

He justified his decision to wait for a week and then turn back, stating that the poor weather, with daytime temperatures as low as −37 °F (−38 °C), made further southward travel impossible, and the lack of dog food meant he would have had to kill dogs for food, against Atkinson's orders. They returned to base on 16 March empty-handed, immediately causing anxiety about Scott's fate.

Two days later, Cherry-Garrard fainted and became an invalid for the following days. Atkinson set forth to fetch Scott, but on 30 March was forced to turn back in the face of low temperatures, and concluded that Scott's party had perished.

=== Search journey ===
Cherry-Garrard was eventually appointed record keeper and continued zoological work. The scientific work continued through the winter and it was not until October 1912 that a team led by Atkinson and including Cherry-Garrard was able to head south to ascertain the fate of the South Pole team.

On 12 November, the bodies of Scott, Wilson and Bowers were found in their tent, along with their diaries and records, and geological specimens they had hauled back from the mountains of the interior. Cherry-Garrard was deeply affected, particularly by the deaths of Wilson and Bowers, with whom he had made the journey to Cape Crozier.

== Later life ==
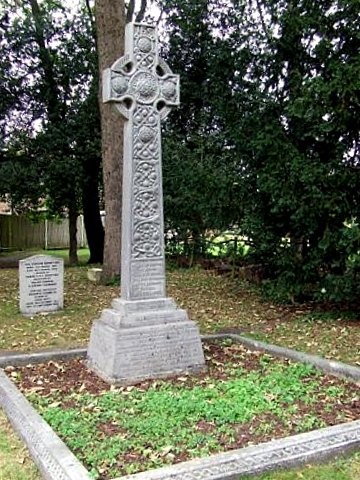
Cherry-Garrard's grave at St Helen's Church, Wheathampstead, Herts

Not long after his return to civilization in February 1913, Cherry-Garrard accompanied Edward Atkinson on his journey to China to assist Atkinson with his investigation on a type of parasitic flatworm that was causing schistosomiasis among British seamen. At the start of the Great War, Cherry-Garrard, along with the help of his mother and sisters, converted Lamer, his family estate, into a field hospital for wounded soldiers returning from the front. Cherry-Garrard journeyed to Belgium in August 1914 with Major Edwin Richardson, a dog trainer who used dogs to sniff out wounded soldiers and founded the British War Dog School, to assist on the front with a pack of bloodhounds. Cherry-Garrard volunteered for this opportunity, in part due to his experience with handling dogs in Antarctica. After this opportunity was cut short, Cherry-Garrard returned to England and was eventually commissioned in the Royal Naval Volunteer Reserve and commanded a squadron of armoured cars in Flanders. Invalided out in 1916, he suffered from clinical depression as well as ulcerative colitis which had developed shortly after returning from Antarctica. His lifespan preceded the description and diagnosis of what is now called post-traumatic stress disorder.

Although his psychological condition was never cured, the explorer was able to treat himself to some extent by writing down his experiences, although he spent many years bed-ridden due to his afflictions. He required repeated dental treatment because of the damage done to his teeth by the extreme cold. He many times revisited the question of what possible alternative choices and actions might have saved the South Pole team — most notably in his 1922 memoir The Worst Journey in the World.

On 6 September 1939, Cherry-Garrard married Angela Katherine Turner (1916–2005), whom he had met during a Norwegian cruise in 1937. They had no children. After the Second World War, ill health and taxes forced him to sell his family estate and move to a flat in London, where he died in Piccadilly on 18 May 1959. He is buried in the north-west corner of the churchyard of St Helen's Church, Wheathampstead.

== Writings ==
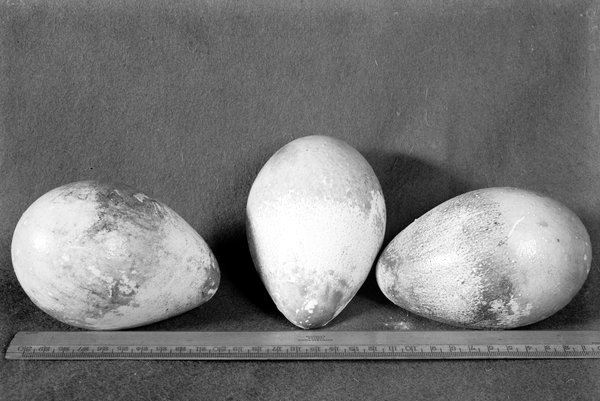
The three Emperor penguin eggs collected at Cape Crozier, at the east end of Ross Island, Antarctica

In 1922, encouraged by his friend George Bernard Shaw, Cherry-Garrard wrote The Worst Journey in the World. Over 80 years later this book is still in print and is often cited as a classic of travel literature, having been acclaimed as the greatest true adventure story ever written. It was published as Penguin Books' 100th publication. As Scott was still considered a hero in postwar Britain at the time of the book's publication, there was some criticism of the book upon release which were aimed at Cherry's descriptions of the negative qualities and traits of Scott. In an article in The Times, one critic said of the book that 'he has evidently, quite in the postwar manner resolved to say what he thinks and emphasize the "heroism" of the story as little as possible.' More recently, however, Roland Huntford has dismissed the Worst Journey as "an immature but persuasive, highly charged apologia".

Cherry-Garrard contributed an essay in remembrance of T. E. Lawrence in the first edition of a volume edited by Lawrence's brother, A. W. Lawrence, T. E. Lawrence, by His Friends. Subsequent abridged editions omit his article. Cherry-Garrard hypothesises in this essay that Lawrence undertook extraordinary acts out of a sense of inferiority and cowardice and a need to prove himself. He suggests, too, that Lawrence's writings – as well as Cherry's own – were therapeutic and helped in dealing with the nervous breakdown of the events they recount.

== Legacy ==
The igloo on Cape Crozier was discovered by the Commonwealth Trans-Antarctic Expedition of 1957–1958. Only 18 to 24 inches (46 to 61 cm) of the stone walls remained standing. Relics were removed and placed in museums in New Zealand.

The three penguin eggs brought back from Cape Crozier are now in the collection of the Natural History Museum, London.

Cherry-Garrard was portrayed by Barry Letts in the 1948 film Scott of the Antarctic, by Hugh Grant in the 1985 television serial The Last Place on Earth, and by Mark Gatiss in the 2007 television docudrama The Worst Journey in the World.
