= Ted Dowd =

British television and radio producer

Ted Dowd is a British television and radio producer. His work includes: This Time and Mid Morning Matters with Alan Partridge, Gavin & Stacey, Saxondale, Nighty Night, Hunderby, Camping, Ideal, The Mighty Boosh, Moone Boy, Home Time and Nebulous.
