= Graham Duff =

English writer, actor and producer

Graham Duff is an English writer, actor and producer. His work for television and radio is typified by intricate plotting, large casts, frequently dark subject matter and a love of wordplay and surrealism.

Duff's writing is influenced by the worlds of horror and science fiction, musical sub-cultures and the realms of fine art and art house cinema. He is a noted music enthusiast, having worked as a DJ and selected all the soundtrack music for seven series of his television show Ideal, as well as compiling an Ideal soundtrack album and helping to release albums by the left-field bands Celebricide and Cyclobe. He also worked as a script editor on seven series of BBC Radio 4's Count Arthur Strong's Radio Show! and the Alan Partridge movie Alpha Papa (2013).

== Early life ==
Duff was born in Blackburn, Lancashire. He graduated from the University of Brighton.

== Career ==
=== Career beginnings ===
Duff began writing and performing in the mid-1980s with the performance art group Theatre of the Bleeding Obelisk and the fringe theatre company Wax Cabinet. During this period, he also worked occasionally as an assistant editor at Ikon, the video department of Manchester's Factory Records. By the early 1990s he was a member of the comedy improvisation group "Fish-heads". With Wax Cabinet colleague Malcolm Boyle, he wrote for BBC Radio 1's Mark Goodier Show and contributed sketches to BBC Radio 3's The Music Makers. Duff also DJ'd and hosted comedy phone-in shows in the guise of self-help guru Doctor Devlin on a number of independent and pirate radio stations, as well as presenting "The Duff Almanac", a regular feature on BBC Radio 4's Loose Ends.

=== Theatre ===
Duff's first one-man stage show was 'Burroughs' (1992) – based on the life and times of infamous beat author William S. Burroughs. The show won a Brighton Festival award and was followed by "Diary of a Madman" (1993), adapted from the novel of the same name by Russian absurdist author Nikolai Gogol. With comedian and writer James Poulter, Duff toured internationally with the stand-up shows "The A–Z of Drugs" (1995) and "The A–Z of Taboo" (1996). These were followed by another solo comedy show "Vinyl Anorak" (1997) about the world of music obsessives.

=== Television ===
Along with Henry Normal and Steve Coogan, Duff co-wrote the six-part comedy horror homage Dr. Terrible's House of Horrible (BBC2 2001), which starred Coogan in seven roles; Duff appeared in four supporting roles. Duff then created and wrote all 53 episodes of Ideal (BBC3 & BBC2 2005–2011) starring Johnny Vegas as Salford cannabis dealer Moz. Duff also appeared in the show as the promiscuous and bitchy gay man Brian, as well as an uncredited role as Moz's frightening, masked neighbour Fist. He co-wrote two series and a Christmas special of the sit-com Hebburn (BBC2 2012–2013) with stand-up comedian and series creator Jason Cook as well as appearing in several episodes as newspaper photographer David Cowgill. He also created and wrote the Sky Arts television series The Nightmare Worlds of H. G. Wells which starred Ray Winstone, Michael Gambon and Rupert Graves; Duff also appeared in the first episode.

=== Radio ===
Duff wrote and performed the lead roles in his six-part comedy series Stereonation (adapted from the stage show Vinyl Anorak) which was broadcast on BBC Radio 4 in the summer of 1998. From 1998 to 2000, he presented Totally Wired, an alternative music show on Brighton's Juice 107.2. Following this, Duff wrote three series of the BBC Radio 4 sci-fi sit-com Nebulous (2005–2008) starring Mark Gatiss as Professor Nebulous. The show featured Duff as the Professor's assistant Rory. Duff has also worked as the script editor on all seven series of BBC Radio 4's Count Arthur Strong's Radio Show! (2005–2011) starring Steve Delaney, the fourth series of which won the Sony Gold Award. Duff currently presents a weekly show, Graham Duff's Mixtape, on Brighton based radio station Slack City which is run by the same directors as Juice 107.2. For BBC Radio 4, he adapted Alexei Sayle's short stories for two series of the comedy drama series The Absence of Normal, with actors including Maxine Peake, Paul Barber and Hugh Quarshie.

=== Acting ===
Aside from appearing in his own work, Duff has a small speaking part as a Death Eater in the films Harry Potter and the Deathly Hallows – Part 1 (2010) and Harry Potter and the Deathly Hallows – Part 2 (2011). He has also appeared in ITV's comedy series Monkey Trousers (2005) and Channel 4's Ketch & Hiro-pon Get it On (2008). He appeared as a convicted child molester and cult leader in two series of David Cross's dark sitcom The Increasingly Poor Decisions of Todd Margaret (2011) and as a Nazi in the Channel 4 comedy show Totally Tom (2011). He played greengrocer Mike Greatbatch in Alan Partridge: Welcome to the Places of My Life (2012) and press photographer David Cowgill in Hebburn (2012–2013). He also played a malevolent bio-mechanoid waiter in "Deep Breath", Peter Capaldi's debut episode of Doctor Who.

=== Books ===
Duff has published three books: Foreground Music: A Life in 15 Gigs (2019), The Future's Here To Stay: The Singles of The Fall (2021) and The Otherwise (2021), which was co-written with Mark E. Smith of The Fall.

=== Articles and online media ===
Duff has written articles for The Guardian and The Wire. He has also contributed a chapter to The Cosey Complex - a book about the life and work of musician and performance artist Cosey Fanni Tutti and written an introduction to Tranart - a monograph on the visual art of Val Denham. Duff has made guest contributions on a number of albums by "People Like Us" aka Vicki Bennett. He acted in Exile — an audio drama based on Doctor Who, as well as writing another — Faith Stealer starring Paul McGann. In 2013, alongside Pat Cahill he co-created and co-wrote Still Reeling, a series of two online comedy blaps for Channel 4 starring Cahill and Matt King.

== Heaven's Lathe ==
In 2021, with designer Lauren Winton and lathe cutter Michael Lawrence, Duff co-founded the Heaven's Lathe record label. The label releases limited edition lathe cut singles, with Duff curating the artists, including established names, such as Adi Newton, Danielle Dax, I Monster, David J, Roger Robinson and Graham Lewis, as well as debut vinyl releases from artists including Wrong Circles, Andrew&Lucy, and White Devil Disco.

== Personal life ==
Duff lives in Blackburn.

== Partial filmography ==
- Harry Potter and the Deathly Hallows – Part 1 (2010) – Death Eater
- Harry Potter and the Deathly Hallows – Part 2 (2011) – Death Eater
- High-Rise (2015) – Queue Person
