= George Murray Levick =

British explorer and naval surgeon (1876–1956)

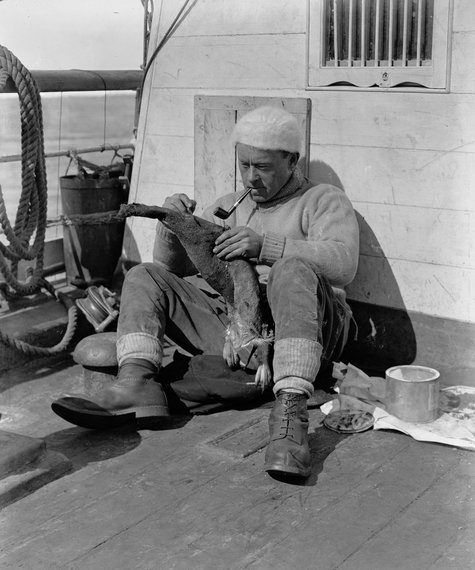
Levick aboard Terra Nova in 1910

George Murray Levick (3 July 1876 – 30 May 1956) was a British Antarctic explorer, naval surgeon and founder of the Public Schools Exploring Society.

== Early life ==
Levick was born in Newcastle upon Tyne, the son of civil engineer George Levick and Jeannie Sowerby. His elder sister was the sculptor Ruby Levick. He studied medicine at St Bartholomew's Hospital and was commissioned a surgeon in the Royal Navy in November 1902. He was secretary of the Royal Navy Rugby Union at its founding in 1907.

== Career ==
=== Terra Nova expedition and trauma ===
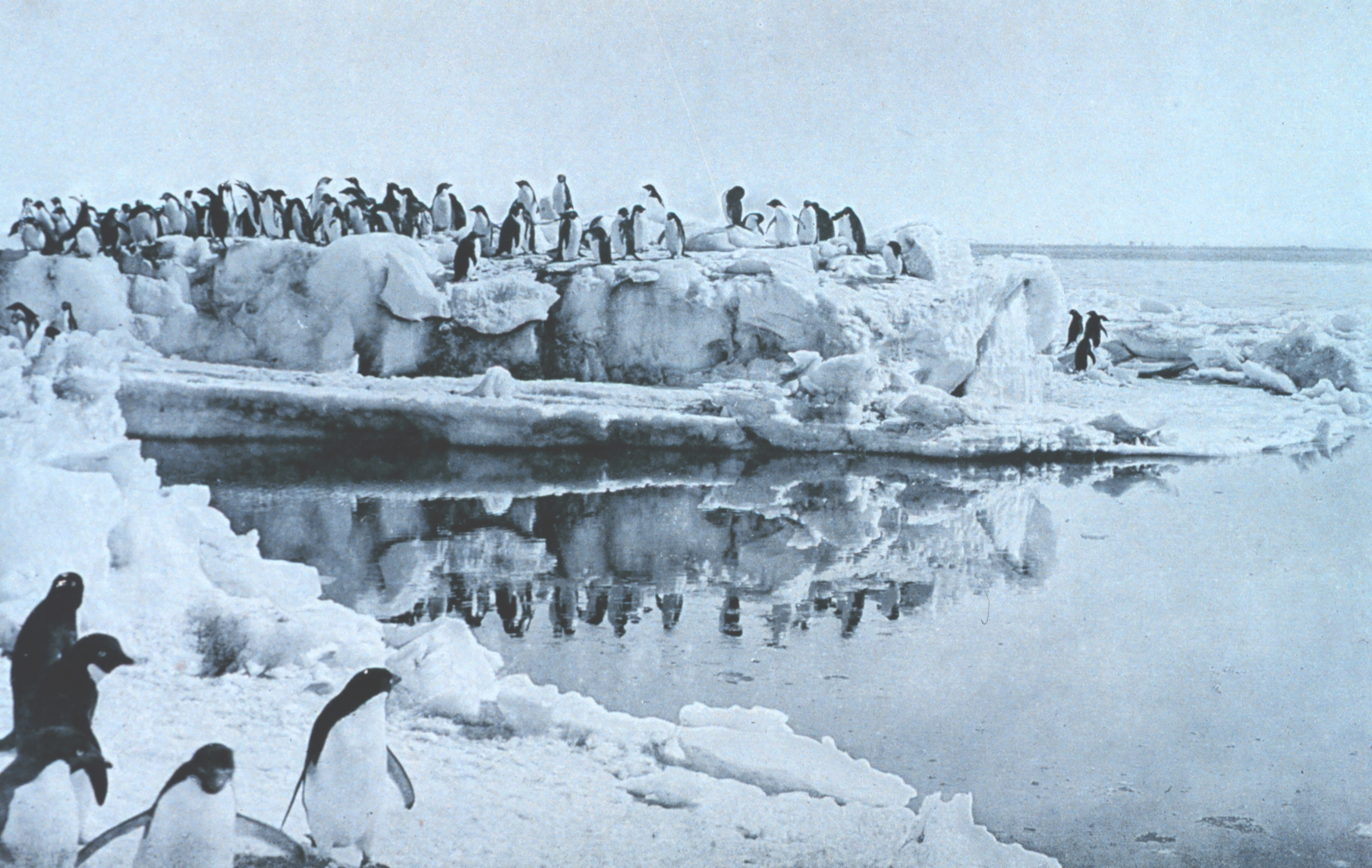
Adélie penguins on the ice foot at Cape Adare by Levick

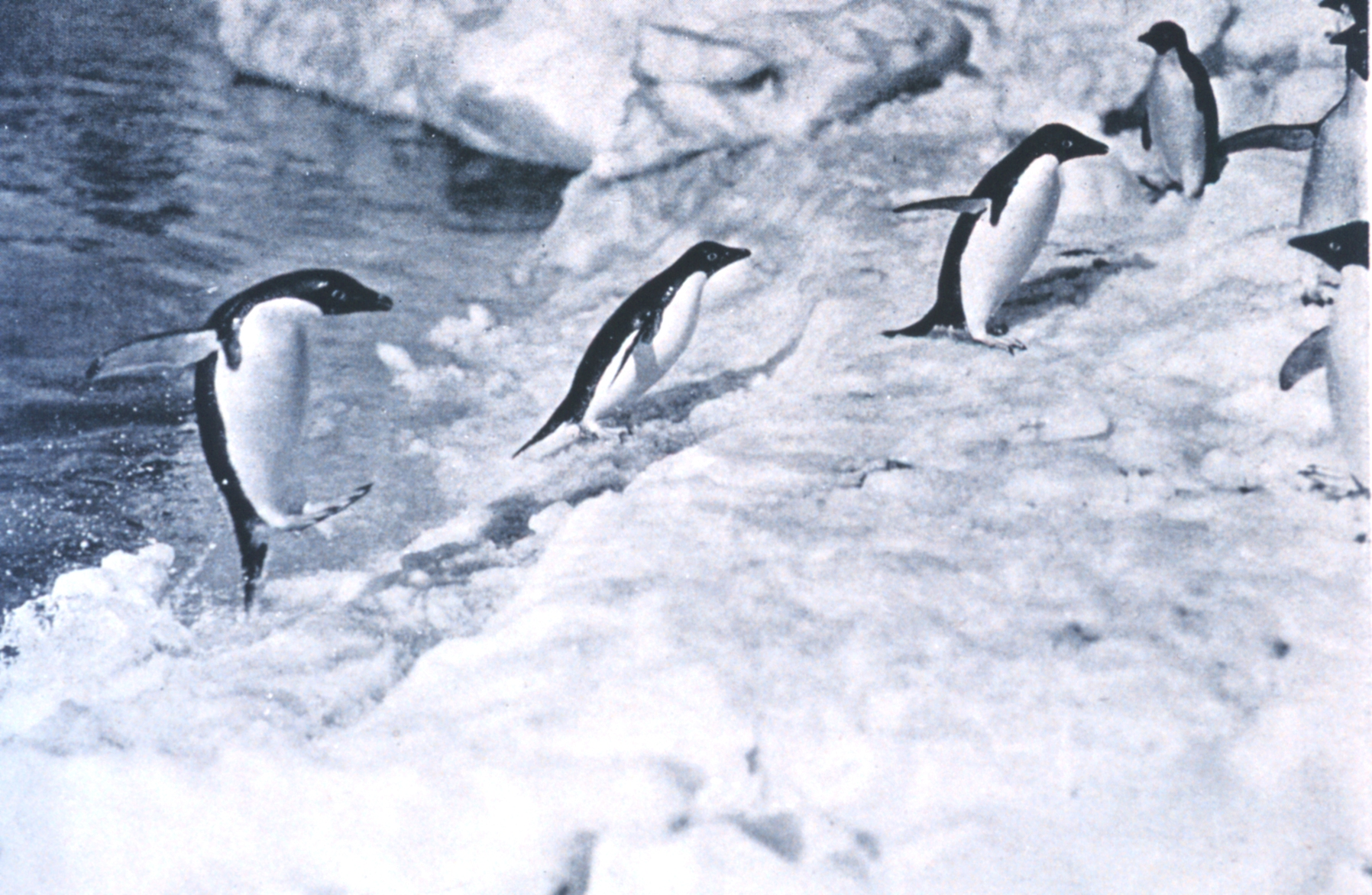
Penguins jumping onto the ice foot by Levick

He was given leave of absence to accompany Robert Falcon Scott as surgeon and zoologist on his Terra Nova expedition. Levick photographed extensively throughout the expedition. Prevented by pack ice from embarking on the Terra Nova in February 1912, Levick and the other five members of the party (Victor L. A. Campbell, Raymond Priestley, George P. Abbott, Harry Dickason, and Frank V. Browning) were forced to overwinter on Inexpressible Island in a cramped ice cave.

Part of the Northern Party, Levick spent the austral summer of 1911–1912 at Cape Adare in the midst of an Adélie penguin rookery. To date, this has been the only study of the Cape Adare rookery, the largest Adélie penguin colony in the world, and he has been the only one to spend an entire breeding cycle there. His observations of the courting, mating, and chick-rearing behaviours of these birds are recorded in his book Antarctic Penguins. A manuscript he wrote about the penguins' sexual habits, which included sexual coercion, sex among males and sex with dead females, was deemed too indecent by the Keeper of Zoology at the British Museum of Natural History, Sir Sidney Harmer, and prevented from being published.

Nearly 100 years later, the manuscript was rediscovered and published in the journal Polar Record in 2012. The discovery significantly illuminates the behaviour of a species that is an indicator of climate change. In 2013, Levick's photography notebook was found by a member of the Antarctic Heritage Trust. It was found outside Scott's 1911 Cape Evans base. The notebook contains Levick's pencil notes detailing the date, subjects and exposure details for the photographs he took while at Cape Adare. After conservation it was returned to Antarctica. This notebook should not be confused with Levick's notebooks of his zoological records at Cape Adare, of which the first volume contains his revelations about the mating behaviour of the penguins.

Apsley Cherry-Garrard described the difficulties endured by the party in the winter of 1912:

They ate blubber, cooked with blubber, had blubber lamps. Their clothes and gear were soaked with blubber, and the soot blackened them, their sleeping-bags, cookers, walls and roof, choked their throats and inflamed their eyes. Blubbery clothes are cold, and theirs were soon so torn as to afford little protection against the wind, and so stiff with blubber that they would stand up by themselves, in spite of frequent scrapings with knives and rubbings with penguin skins, and always there were underfoot the great granite boulders which made walking difficult even in daylight and calm weather. As Levick said, "the road to hell might be paved with good intentions, but it seemed probable that hell itself would be paved something after the style of Inexpressible Island."

=== First World War ===
On his return, Levick served in the Grand Fleet and at Gallipoli on board HMS Bacchante during the First World War. He was specially promoted in 1915 to the rank of fleet surgeon for his services with the Antarctic Expedition. He married Edith Audrey Mayson Beeton, a granddaughter of Isabella Beeton, on 16 November 1918.

After his retirement from the Royal Navy he pioneered the training of blind people in physiotherapy against much opposition. In 1932, he founded the Public Schools Exploring Society, which took groups of schoolboys to Scandinavia and Canada, and remained its president until his death in June 1956.

=== Second World War ===
In 1940, at the beginning of World War II, he returned to the Royal Navy, at the age of 64, to take up a position, as a specialist in guerrilla warfare, at the Commando Special Training Centre at Lochailort, on the west coast of Scotland. He taught fitness, diet and survival techniques, many of which were published in his 1944 training manual Hardening of Commando Troops for Warfare.

He was one of the consultants for Operation Tracer; in the event that Gibraltar was taken by the Axis powers, a small party was to be sealed into a secret chamber, dubbed Stay Behind Cave, in the Rock of Gibraltar to report enemy movements.

== Death ==
Levick died on 30 May 1956 at the age of 79. At the time of his death, Major D. Glyn Owen, chairman of the British Exploring Society wrote: "A truly great Englishman has passed from our midst, but the memory of his nobleness of character and our pride in his achievements cannot pass from us. Having been on Scott's last Antarctic expedition, Murray Levick was later to resolve that exploring facilities for youth should be created under as rigorous conditions as could be made available. With his usual untiring energy and purposefulness he turned this concept into reality when he founded the Public Schools Exploring Society in 1932, later to become the British Schools Exploring Society, drawing schoolboys of between 16 and 18½ years to partake in annual expeditions abroad into wild and trackless country."
