= Cecil Meares =

British adventurer

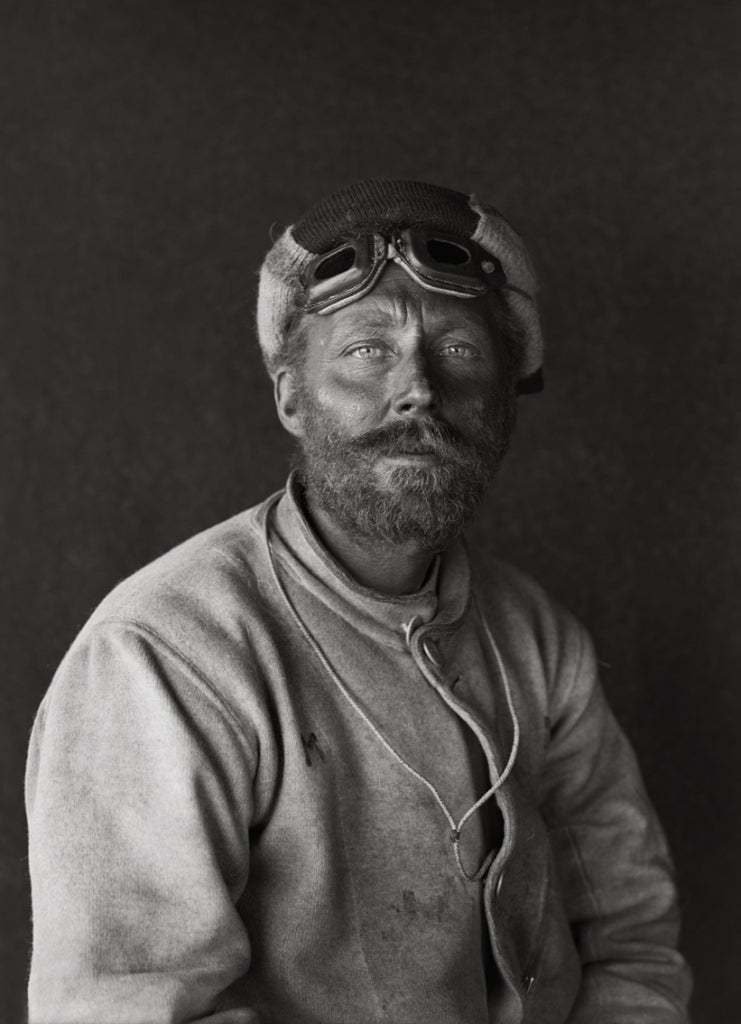
- Meares in 1912
- Born: Cecil Henry Meares; 14 February 1877; Inistioge, Kilkenny, Ireland
- Died: 12 May 1937 (aged 60); Victoria, B.C., Canada
- Military career
- Branch: British Army; Royal Naval Reserve
- Units: Corps of Interpreters; Royal Naval Air Service
- Wars: Second Boer War; World War I

Cecil Henry Meares (14 February 1877 – 12 May 1937) was a British military officer, interpreter, adventurer, and explorer.

He worked in the Siberian fur trade, was in Peking during the Boxer Uprising, served in the army during the Second Boer War, explored Tibet with the J. W. Brooke expedition, and was the officer in charge of sled dogs on the ill-fated Terra Nova Expedition of 1910–1913 – the British attempt to be the first to reach the geographic South Pole.

After 1914 he served in the Corps of Interpreters and as a Royal Naval Volunteer Reserve officer in the Royal Naval Air Service during the First World War.

== Early life ==
Cecil Henry Meares was born in Inistioge, Ireland on 14 February 1877 to Major Meares and his wife, Helen (née Townsend). He had lived in Ireland until around 1880, when he went to live with relatives in England. Meares had taught himself to read at four years old and was educated at schools in both Scotland and England. Having been denied a place in the army due to failing his medical exam, Meares spent the next decade traveling around Europe. It was during this time that Meares would start learning different languages. In 1894 he studied Spanish, in Bilbao, Spain and a year later had traveled to Torrepillece in Italy to learn Italian. From 1896 and into the first few years of the 20th century Meares traveled extensively. He worked at coffee planting in India and later traded furs in Russia and across Manchuria. Meares would also be involved in the Boxer Rebellion during his time in China.

== Terra Nova Expedition ==
Sledge flag used by Meares in Antarctica during the Terra Nova Expedition

In 1910, Meares joined Robert Falcon Scott on the Terra Nova Expedition to the Antarctic, donating £1,000 (equivalent to £102,000 in 2025) to Scott's funds. Meares's tasks included selecting and purchasing the 34 dogs and 20 ponies for the expedition and then transporting them from Siberia to New Zealand via Japan where they were to join up with the expedition. Meares knew little about ponies, but nevertheless followed Scott's orders and went to Nikolayevsk, Siberia to select the dogs. There he met Dimitri Gerov, an experienced dog driver, who helped him choose the dogs required for the sledging tasks and who was subsequently recruited as a dog driver for the expedition. Meares also recruited Russian jockey Anton Omelchenko as groom on the expedition.

They then travelled to Vladivostok where the Siberian ponies were purchased. Scott specifically wanted white ponies for the expedition because during the 1907 Nimrod Expedition, Ernest Shackleton observed that the white ponies outlived the dark ponies. Lawrence Oates, the British Army captain on the expedition whose role was to look after the ponies, was disappointed in Meares's selection as they had "such deficiencies as: narrow chests, knocked knees, …aged" and were the "greatest lot of crocks I have ever seen". Once the Terra Nova Expedition began, Meares and Gerov looked after the dogs. After setting off as part of the support team on the journey to the South Pole in early November 1911, Meares and the Russian Gerov turned back north with the sled dogs on 14 December at the foot of the Beardmore glacier.

Meares clashed with Scott throughout the expedition. Meares refused to follow one of Scott's orders during the Depot Journey regarding the retrieval of one of the dog teams that had fallen into a crevasse. He eventually resigned from the expedition months later for unsubstantiated reasons and returned home on the Terra Nova in March 1912. Sometime after his arrival back in Britain, Meares had a meeting with Caroline Oates, who was conducting personal interviews in regards to the death of her son. Seemingly in regards to his clashes with Scott, Meares related to her that "there used to be great trouble and unhappiness...and the worst was it was not possible to get away from the rows."

Some controversy surrounds Meares's "unavailability" for further Barrier (Ross Ice Shelf) work for the 2 months prior to his boarding the Terra Nova to return home, while the base camp was under the command of George Simpson and then Edward L. Atkinson. Meares's return to civilisation before the Antarctic winter of 1912 was not unexpected (in Scott's instructions to the commanding officer of the Terra Nova written before his departure for the pole he stated that Meares might return on the ship, depending on letters from home), but it remains unclear as to why he was not available to undertake sledge work with the dogs during the autumn season, nor why Simpson or Atkinson did not force him to do so, given that the expedition was run on strict naval terms.

In a letter to Apsley Cherry-Garrard in 1919, Atkinson wrote of the controversy surrounding Meares during the expedition: "I think you may make trouble with Meares by insisting we know his orders but have no proof in writing of them. You and I know that he disobeyed orders. I thought unwillingly then that he was flying the white feather [i.e. demonstrating cowardice] ... if you make a statement to that effect and if it was challenged, you would have to substantiate it in writing ... The Owner [Scott] unfortunately never kept copies of his orders."

In the book Beneath the Shadow: Legacy and Longing in the Antarctic, author Justin Gardiner also weighed in on the controversy with Meares. Gardiner stated that he believed Meares' negligence in following Scott's orders resulted in a huge part of the failure of the Polar Party returning alive. Gardiner believed that Meares' arrival back at base two weeks later than expected despite Scott's orders to travel further south with the dog teams, coupled with Meares' anxiousness about missing the ship home, was one of the reasons for the Polar Party's demise.

In 2012, Karen May at the Scott Polar Research Institute re-discovered the following facts. In 1921, Edward Evans revealed in his book South with Scott that Scott had left the following written orders at Cape Evans dated 20 October 1911, to secure Scott's speedy return from the pole using dogs:

About the first week of February I should like you to start your third journey to the South, the object being to hasten the return of the third Southern unit [the polar party] and give it a chance to catch the ship. The date of your departure must depend on news received from returning units, the extent of the depot of dog food you have been able to leave at One Ton Camp, the state of the dogs, etc ... It looks at present as though you should aim at meeting the returning party about March 1 in Latitude 82 or 82.30

You will of course understand that whilst the object of the third journey is important that of the second is vital. At all hazards three X.S. units of provision must be got to One Ton Camp by the date named [January 19th], and if the dogs are unable to perform this service, a man party must be organised. (Signed) R. F. Scott.

This order was ultimately not carried out.

Expedition member Apsley Cherry-Garrard initially omitted mentioning Scott's order in his 1922 book The Worst Journey in the World. However, in the 1948 preface to his book, also rediscovered in 2012, he admits to the existence of Scott's order, and explains the order could not have been carried out because insufficient dog food had been laid out (this was Meares's responsibility, being the dog-driver and the recipient of Scott's order) and because one of the base camp team, Atkinson, was too exhausted at the specified time of departure.

== Later life ==
During World War I, he joined the Royal Flying Corps, rising to the rank of lieutenant-colonel. In 1915, Meares married Anna Christina Spengler (1891-1974). Following the end of the war, he traveled to Japan and assisted the Japanese Naval Air Service as part of the British Air Mission.

After his return from Japan, Meares and his wife later moved to Victoria, British Columbia, Canada. The couple lived a quiet life there and involved themselves in various community gatherings. Meares died in Victoria in 1937. His wife, Annie, died in September 1974. She bequeathed a lot of Meares' possessions and letters to the Royal British Columbia Museum.

== Legacy ==
Meares was portrayed by Melville Crawford in the 1948 film Scott of the Antarctic, and by Bill Nighy in the 1985 television serial The Last Place on Earth.

== Bibliography ==
- Evans, E. R. G. R. (1949). South with Scott. Collins.
- May, Karen (January 2013). "Could Captain Scott have been saved? Revisiting Scott's last expedition". Polar Record. 49 (1): 72–90. Bibcode:2013PoRec..49...72M. doi:10.1017/S0032247411000751.
