= Everybody Works but Father =

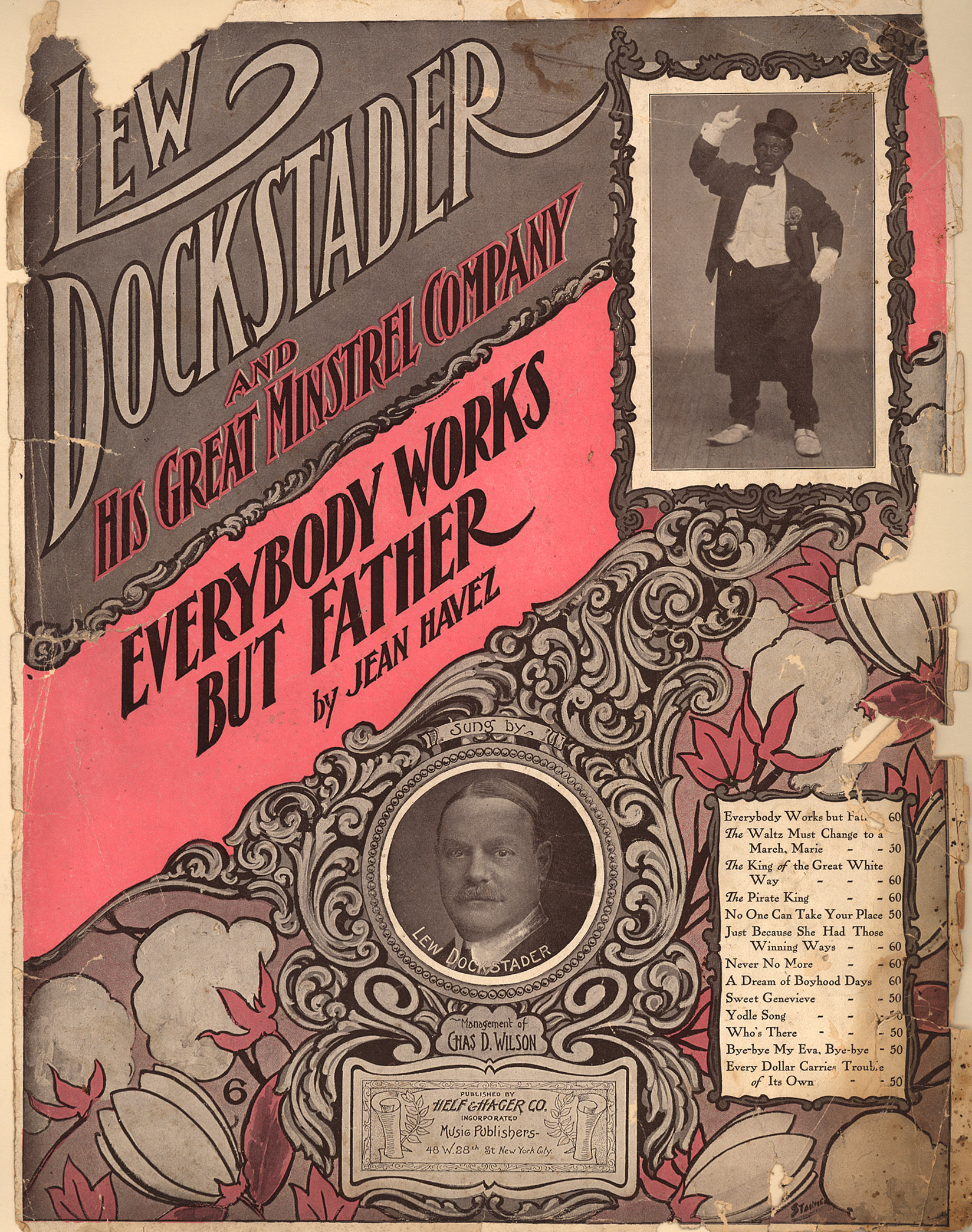
1905 sheet music cover featuring Lew Dockstader.

"Everybody Works but Father" is a popular song published in 1905, with words and music by Jean Havez. It is sung from the son's point of view, lamenting that he, his sister and his mother all work, while his father lounges all day: "Everybody works at our house but my old man." The song was introduced and recorded by blackface performer Lew Dockstader.

The song was sufficiently popular that it inspired a "sequel" titled "Uncle Quit Work Too", about a mooching relative who "sits around the house with about a half a souse and he never does a doggone thing."

Another inspired sequel was "Father's Got a Job", recorded by Maidie Scott.

It was recorded by artists of the day including Billy Murray. It was in the repertoire of Groucho Marx, who would include the song with a segment he performed about fathers.

In his 1922 memoir, The Worst Journey in the World, Apsley Cherry-Garrard recalled that some of the men on the Terra Nova expedition would sing it as a joke about Victor L. A. Campbell, the only father aboard, who was generally found hard at work.
