= Frank Browning =

Frank Browning may refer to:

- Frank Browning (baseball) (1882–1948), American baseball player
- Frank Browning (author), American author and correspondent for National Public Radio
- Frank V. Browning (1882–1930), British explorer of Antarctica
