= Harry Dickason =

Harry Dickason may refer to:

- Harry Dickason (gymnast) (1890–1962), British gymnast
- Harry Dickason (Royal Navy sailor) (1885–1943), English polar explorer

== See also ==
- Harry Dickson, fictional pulp detective
