= Victor L. A. Campbell =

Royal Navy officer and explorer (1875–1956)

Captain Victor Campbell DSO OBE
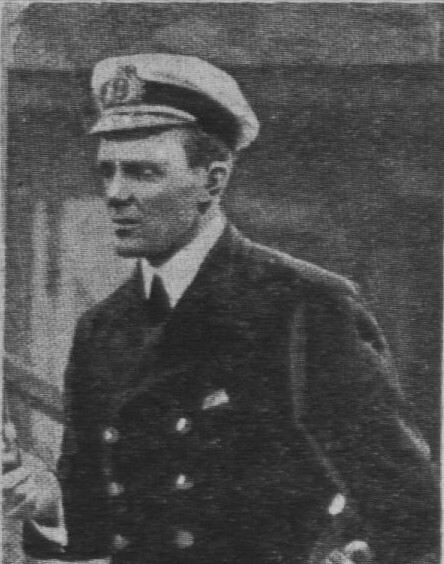
- Born: 20 August 1875; Hove, Sussex, England
- Died: 19 November 1956 (aged 81); Corner Brook, Newfoundland
- Military career
- Allegiance: United Kingdom
- Branch: Royal Navy
- Service years: 1895–1922; 1939–1944
- Rank: Captain
- Commands: Drake Battalion, Royal Naval Division
- Expedition(s): Terra Nova expedition
- Conflicts: First World War; Dardanelles campaign; Battle of Jutland; Zeebrugge Raid; North Russia intervention
- Awards: Polar Medal

Victor Lindsey Arbuthnot Campbell DSO OBE (20 August 1875 – 19 November 1956) was an English Royal Navy officer and Antarctic explorer.

== Career ==
=== Terra Nova expedition ===
Sledge flag used by Campbell in Antarctica during the Terra Nova Expedition

"Lieutenant Evans... ably seconded by Victor Campbell, first officer, commonly called The Mate, in whose hands the routine and discipline of the ship was most efficiently maintained. I was very frightened of Campbell."

— Apsley Cherry-Garrard, The Worst Journey in the World

In 1910, he was first officer on the Terra Nova expedition by Robert Falcon Scott. After arriving in Antarctica in January 1911, his role was to lead an eastern party of six men to explore and carry out scientific work in King Edward VII Land, to the east of the Barrier. On 26 January 1911, Campbell's party left in the Terra Nova and headed east. After failing to find a suitable landing site on the King Edward VII Land shore, Campbell decided to sail to Victoria Land. In The Worst Journey in the World, author Apsley Cherry-Garrard remembers that during this time, some of the men would sing Everybody Works But Father as a way to tease Campbell, as the only father aboard and a hard worker. Cherry-Garrard also described a scene in which Campbell sang the same hymns each Sunday because "it was about the only one he knew". On its return westward, Terra Nova encountered Roald Amundsen's expedition camped in the Bay of Whales, an inlet in the Barrier.

After returning to Cape Evans and informing Scott of Amundsen's location, Campbell's party were renamed the "Northern Party" and set off again, sailing northwards and put ashore at Robertson's Bay, near Cape Adare. They built a hut and wintered at Cape Adare but due to the sea ice conditions were unable to fulfil much of their intended summer explorations. In January 1912, Terra Nova returned from New Zealand, and transferred the party of Campbell, Raymond Priestley, George Murray Levick, George P. Abbott, Harry Dickason, and Frank V. Browning to Evans Coves, a location 250 miles (400 km) south of Cape Adare and 200 miles (320 km) northwest of Cape Evans. However, they only had sledging provisions for six weeks with the intention of completing the geological work in a couple of weeks.

After the work was done they were left with rations for about four weeks. It was not anticipated the ship would have trouble picking them up as arranged in February but Terra Nova could not reach them due to heavy pack ice. Unable to connect with their ship, the Northern Party was forced to winter in Antarctica again. The party built an ice cave on Inexpressible Island where they spent the winter in miserable conditions, supplementing their rations by killing scarce seal and penguins. On 30 September 1912, they set off for Cape Evans, finally arriving on 7 November, after crossing more than 200 miles (320 km) of sea ice. After learning of the death of Scott and the entire Polar party, as the senior remaining naval officer, Campbell assumed command of the expedition for its final weeks.

=== First World War ===
During the First World War, Campbell fought as commander of the Drake Battalion in the Dardanelles campaign at Gallipoli—where he received the Distinguished Service Order (DSO)—the Battle of Jutland and the Zeebrugge Raid on board HMS Warwick in 1918.

Campbell served in the Dover Patrol and sank a U-boat by ramming it, for which he was awarded the bar to his DSO. In his further service with the Royal Navy, he reached the rank of captain.

== Later life and death ==
During the winter of 1918–1919, Campbell was posted to Murmansk in North Russia during the Archangel campaign, having been recommended by fellow Antarctic explorer Sir Ernest Shackleton to help instruct British forces in the use of arctic equipment. For this work he was appointed an Officer of the Order of the British Empire.

Campbell emigrated to the Dominion of Newfoundland in 1922. He died in 1956 and was buried at the Montgomerie Street Catholic Cemetery in Corner Brook.

== Legacy ==
Campbell was portrayed by Julian Fox in the 1985 Central Television serial The Last Place on Earth.
