= Frank V. Browning =

British explorer (1882–1930)

Frank Vernon Browning (1882–1930) was a native of Devonshire and explorer of Antarctica. He was part of the Terra Nova Expedition of 1910–1913. In this service he was one of the castaways of the Northern Party that was marooned overwinter on Victoria Land in 1912.

== Antarctica ==
Frank Vernon Browning was born in June 1882 in Stockland, Devon. After ending his schooling he joined the Royal Navy in June 1900. Continuing in the Senior Service, he made Petty Officer 2nd Class in November 1905. As a Petty Officer he joined the Terra Nova Expedition, bound for Antarctica, in 1910.

As a messdeck seaman, Browning helped sail the Terra Nova from Cardiff to McMurdo Sound in Antarctic waters. His expedition mates remembered his kindness to the ship's cat, which was named Nigger, this being an acceptable name for a black cat in 1910. After the Terra Nova anchored at Cape Evans, Browning joined the Shore Party and embarked upon active Antarctic service. Expedition commander Robert Falcon Scott and one of his officers, Victor L. A. Campbell, chose Browning to serve under Campbell in what became the Northern Party, a subsidiary expedition to a patch of Victoria Land Antarctic coastline northwest of the main base.

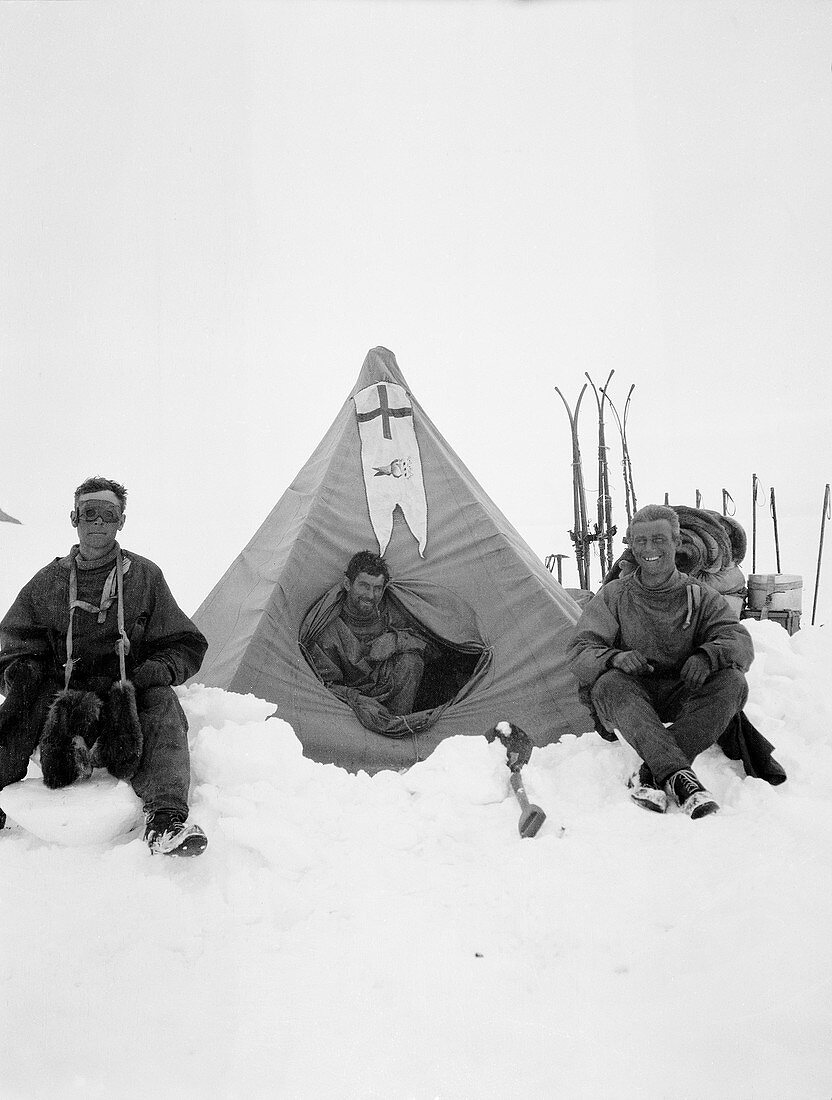
Browning (centre) with fellow party members George Murray Levick (left) and George P. Abbott (right) on 10 January 1912

The Northern Party was supposed to explore a section of rocky and icy coast, collect geological specimens, and then be retrieved by the Terra Nova. However this retrieval did not take place. Instead, during the winter of 1912, the party was icebound and marooned on Inexpressible Island, an island on the coast being explored. They were forced to fall back on their own resources. This was the Antarctic winter in which expedition commander Scott and his immediate companions perished while attempting to return from the South Pole.

More fortunate than Scott, Browning and his fellow members of the Northern Party were on a coastline with some animal life that could be killed and eaten. Although the sledging rations that they had brought with them ran out, they were able to carve an emergency ice cave for themselves and hunt meat to survive. Browning won the plaudits of his comrades for killing a predator seal whose stomach contained 36 edible fish. The fresh seal meat contained vitamin C and, unlike Scott's polar party, the Northern Party did not come down with scurvy. With an inadequate but survival-level diet, the members of the Northern Party suffered intensely from other symptoms, including ptomaine poisoning. Under near-lethal conditions, the members of the Northern Party managed to trek towards their expedition's main base during the spring of the 1912–1913 sledging season, and Browning and his comrades were rescued.

=== Legacy ===
Mount Browning, a 762m-high mountain on the coast of Victoria Land, and Browning Pass, a mountain gap through which ice flows and feeds the Campbell Glacier, are named in honor of Petty Officer Frank V. Browning.
