= Thomas Clissold =

Thomas Charles Clissold (June 1887 – 20 October 1963) was an Englishman who served as the cook on the Terra Nova expedition of 1910–1913.

== Biography ==
Clissold was born in Chatham, Kent, England. He joined the Terra Nova expedition after service on HMS Harrier. He did not take part in the expedition's main attempt to reach the pole, however he was one of four men who hauled provisions to One Ton Depot in December 1911 and January 1912. He sustained a severe concussion when he fell off an iceberg, while posing for the expedition's photographer Herbert Ponting during the summer of 1911–1912, and was consequently replaced as the shore party's cook for the following year by Walter Archer.

After returning from the Antarctic and subsequent to service in the First World War, Clissold emigrated to New Zealand where he took a job as a vehicle inspector in Napier.

== Legacy ==
Clissold was portrayed by Robin Summers in the 1985 Central Television serial The Last Place on Earth.
