= George Simpson (meteorologist) =

British meteorologist (1878–1965)

Sir George Simpson KCB CBE FRS FRSE
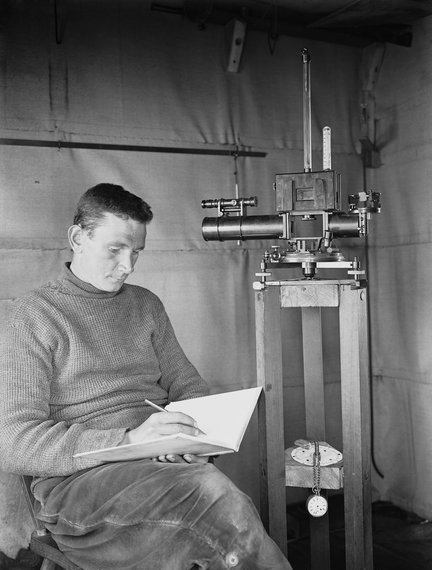
- Simpson making scientific observations in the magnetic hut during the Terra Nova Expedition, 1911
- Born: George Clarke Simpson; 2 September 1878; Derby
- Died: 1 January 1965 (aged 86)
- Awards: The Chree Medal and Prize (1951); Fellow of the Royal Society
- Scientific career
- Fields: Meteorology
- Workplaces: University of Manchester; Meteorological Office

Sir George Clarke Simpson KCB CBE FRS HFRSE (2 September 1878 – 1 January 1965) was a British meteorologist. He was President of the Royal Meteorological Society 1940/41.

== Life ==
George Clarke Simpson was born in Derby, England, the son of Arthur Simpson (the proprietor of a department store in East Street) and his wife, Alice Lambton Clarke.

He was educated at Derby School. He then studied Science at Owens College in Manchester graduating BSc in 1900 and then doing postgraduate studies at the University of Göttingen.

In 1902 he visited Lapland to investigate atmospheric electricity. In 1905 he became the first person to lecture in meteorology at a British university when he was appointed lecturer at the University of Manchester. In 1906, he joined the Indian Meteorological Service as an Imperial Meteorologist at their headquarters in Simla and inspected many of the meteorological stations in India and Burma.

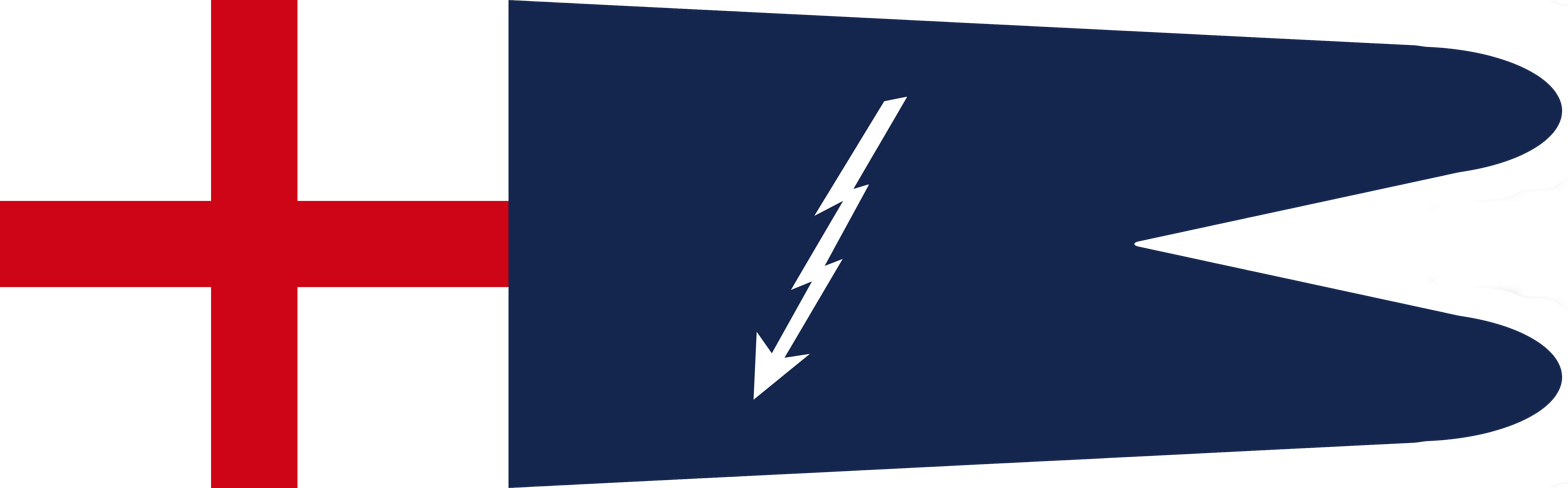
Sledge flag used by Simpson in Antarctica during the Terra Nova Expedition

In 1910, he and his colleague Charles Wright were the meteorologists for Robert Falcon Scott's Antarctic Terra Nova Expedition. Given the nickname 'Sunny Jim' by the other expedition members, he constructed one of the continent's first weather stations, conducting balloon experiments to test the atmosphere and determine how altitude affects temperature. Simpson recorded the temperature and wind observations at the base camp at Cape Evans. He also held command of this station for several months when Scott and his party left for the journey to the South Pole in November 1911.

Returning from Antarctica in August 1912 (the outcome of the race to the South Pole was already known by then, but not the fate of Scott and the final Polar Party), Simpson went back to Simla to re-join the 'Indian Meteorological Services' which had its head office in Kolkata and its branch office in Simla. Whilst in Simla, George Simpson lived at Khud Cottage, today also known as Madan Kunj. It was here at Khud Cottage that Simpson compiled the notes he had made on the Antarctic exploration, as well as receiving the news of Scott and the Polar Party's death after it was made public following the Expedition's return to England in early 1913, which sent him into a deep depression.

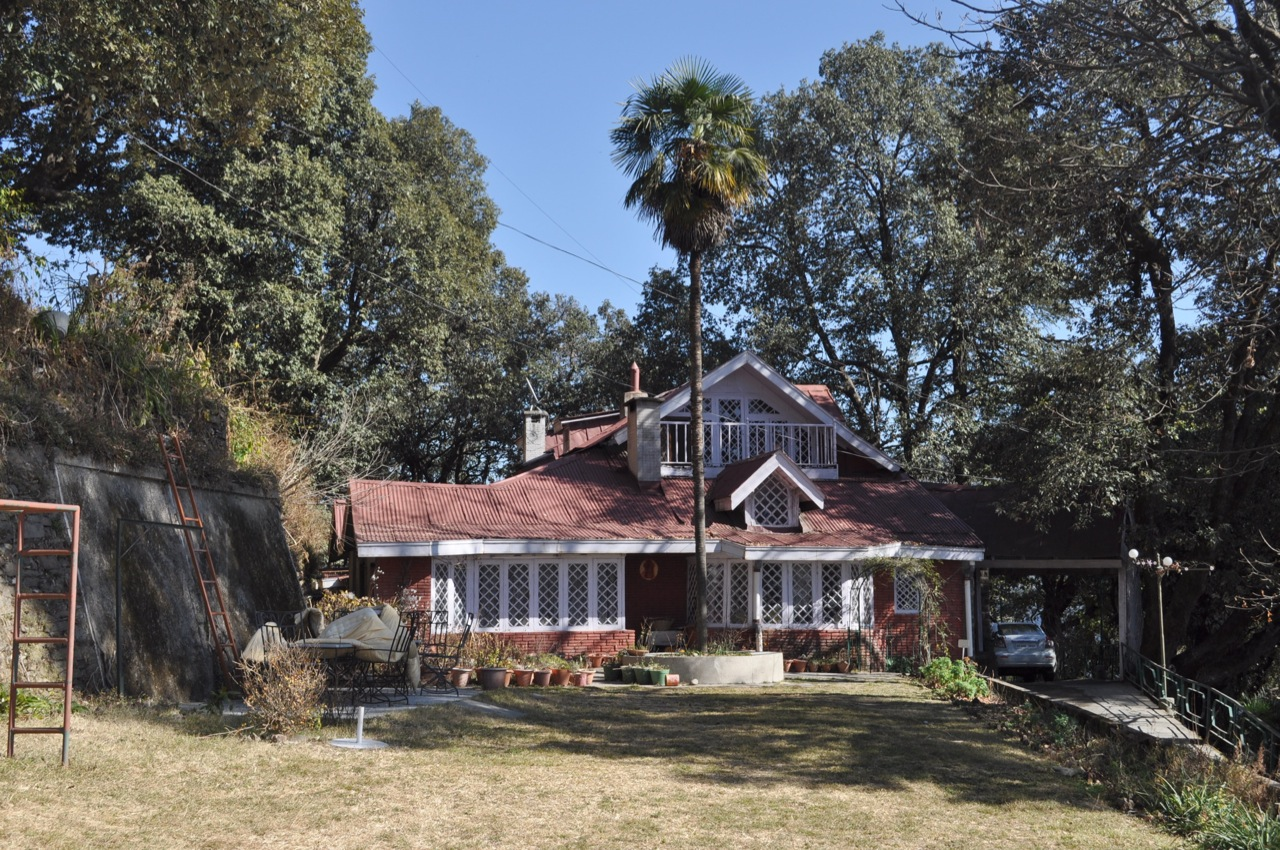
Khud Cottage Simla

Currently this cottage belongs to Rajeev Madan, and it has been in his family since 1939. Khud Cottage was also the erstwhile residence of the Governor of Burma, during World War II when Burma was occupied by Japan.

When the First World War broke out in 1914, many of the staff of the Indian Meteorologist Department were drafted for military service. From March to May 1916, Simpson had to perform army service as the meteorological adviser to the British Expeditionary Force in Mesopotamia, which now forms part of southern Iraq. Later, he was called upon to serve as Assistant Secretary to the Board of Munitions and had to leave Simla again.

In 1920 he was appointed Director of the Meteorological Office, London. He went on to be its longest serving Director, retiring in 1938. During his tenure as Director, he was engaged in research work in the fields of atmospheric electricity, ionization, radioactivity and solar radiation. He investigated the causes of lightning and in 1926 established the Simpson wind force scale, a modification of the Beaufort wind force scale which is the current standard scale used worldwide; still called the Beaufort wind force scale.

Simpson was knighted by King George V in 1935.

When the Second World War began in 1939, Simpson was recalled from retirement into active service, and was asked to take charge of the Kew Observatory. There he continued his research work on the electrical structure of thunderstorms until 1947.

Simpson was awarded honorary doctoral degrees by the universities of Manchester, Sydney and Aberdeen.

Simpson died in Bristol on New Year's Day, 1 January 1965, at the age of 86.

== Family ==
Simpson married Dorothy Jane Stephen, daughter of Cecil Stephen, on 23 September 1914. They had four children: Scott Simpson (1915–1981), Professor of Geology at Exeter University; Arthur Simpson (British scientist specialised in the study of plants and sea animals); Oliver Simpson (a National Physical Laboratory physicist); and Jean Simpson, a medical doctor.

== Honours and awards ==
- Hon DSc (Manchester & Sydney)
- Hon LLD (Aberdeen)
- Fellow of the Royal Society, 1915
- Commander of the Order of the British Empire, 1919
- Companion of the Order of the Bath, 1926 Birthday Honours
- Knight Commander of the Order of the Bath, 1935
- President of the British Meteorological Society, 1940–1942
- The British Antarctic Survey's Ice and Climate Building in Halley Bay, Antarctica (75° 35'S, 26° 40'W), is known as The Simpson Platform, in memory of Sir George Clarke Simpson.

== In popular culture ==
Simpson was portrayed by Anthony Hyde in the 1985 Central Television serial The Last Place on Earth.
