= Harry Dickason (Royal Navy sailor) =

English Royal Navy sailor and Antarctic explorer

- Born: 16 December 1884; Clifton, Bristol, England
- Died: 3 December 1943 (aged 58); Battersea, London, England
- Military career
- Branch: Royal Navy
- Wars: World War I Russian Civil War
- Awards: Polar Medal with clasp (1913); Distinguished Service Medal (1915); Bar to the Distinguished Service Medal (1919)

Harry Dickason (16 December 1884 – 3 December 1943) was an English Royal Navy sailor and Antarctic explorer. He was a member of the British Antarctic Expedition, 1910–1913, serving with the Northern Party under Victor Campbell. After the expedition he continued his naval career, receiving the Distinguished Service Medal in 1915 and a bar to the medal in 1919. Mount Dickason in Victoria Land, Antarctica, was named for him.

== Terra Nova Expedition ==
Dickason served as an able seaman in Campbell's party on the Terra Nova expedition. After the expedition's encounter with Roald Amundsen in the Bay of Whales, Campbell's intended "Eastern Party" was redirected and became the Northern Party. The six-man party wintered first in a hut at Cape Adare and then, after Terra Nova was unable to retrieve them because of heavy pack ice, spent a second winter in an ice cave on Inexpressible Island.

In an obituary written by Raymond Priestley, Dickason was remembered as one of the Northern Party's three long-service naval seamen. Priestley wrote that during the winter of 1912 Dickason was the party's chief cook, and praised his "efficiency and unvarying cheerfulness" during the months spent in the snow cave.

The Northern Party reached Cape Evans again on 7 November 1912. Dickason also took part in a 1912 ascent of Mount Erebus with Raymond Priestley, Tryggve Gran, Frederick Hooper, George Abbott and Frank Debenham.

== Later naval career ==
Dickason remained in the Royal Navy after returning from Antarctica. He received the Polar Medal with clasp in 1913 for his service in the British Antarctic Expedition. In November 1915 he was awarded the Distinguished Service Medal as Petty Officer Harry Dickason, official number 209527. In November 1919 he received a bar to the Distinguished Service Medal for services in the Caspian Sea during the Russian Civil War.

== Legacy ==
Mount Dickason, at the head of the Boomerang Glacier in Victoria Land, was named for Dickason by Campbell's Northern Party. Papers relating to his expedition service are held in the Harry Dickason collection at the Scott Polar Research Institute. His journals were later published as Penguins and Primus: An Account of the Northern Expedition June 1910 – February 1913.
