= Terra Nova Expedition =

1910–13 British Antarctic expedition

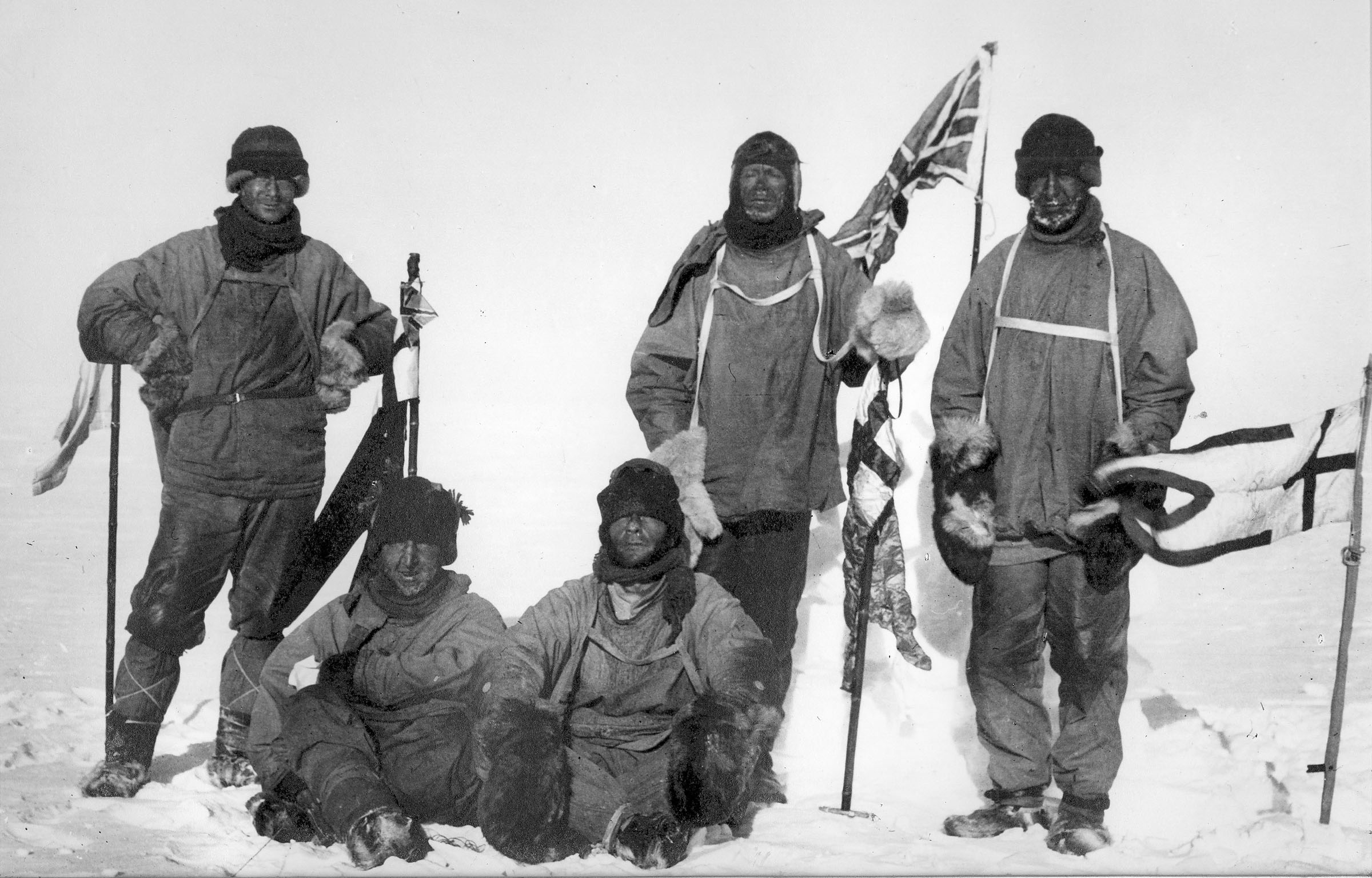
Edward Adrian Wilson, Robert Falcon Scott, Lawrence Oates, Henry Robertson Bowers and Edgar Evans at the South Pole

The Terra Nova Expedition, officially the British Antarctic Expedition, was an expedition to Antarctica which took place between 1910 and 1913. Led by Captain Robert Falcon Scott, the expedition had various scientific and geographical objectives. Scott wished to continue the scientific work that he had begun when leading the Discovery Expedition from 1901 to 1904, and wanted to be the first to reach the geographic South Pole.

He and four companions attained the pole on 17 January 1912, where they found that a Norwegian team led by Roald Amundsen had preceded them by 34 days. Scott's party of five died on the return journey from the pole; some of their bodies, journals, and photographs were found by a search party eight months later. The expedition, named after its supply ship, was a private venture financed by public contributions and a government grant. It had further backing from the Admiralty, which released experienced seamen to the expedition, and from the Royal Geographical Society. The expedition's team of scientists carried out a comprehensive scientific programme, while other parties explored Victoria Land and the Western Mountains. An attempted landing on and exploration of King Edward VII Land was unsuccessful. A journey to Cape Crozier in June and July 1911 was the first extended sledging journey in the depths of the Antarctic winter.

For many years after his death, Scott's status as tragic hero was unchallenged and few questions were asked about the causes of the disaster which overcame his polar party. In the final quarter of the 20th century the expedition came under closer scrutiny, and more critical views were expressed about its organization and management. The degree of Scott's personal culpability and, more recently, the culpability of certain expedition members, remains controversial.

== Preparations ==
=== Background ===
After RRS Discovery's return from the Antarctic in 1904, Captain Robert Falcon Scott eventually resumed his naval career but continued to nurse ambitions of returning south, with the conquest of the South Pole as his specific target. The Discovery Expedition had made a significant contribution to Antarctic scientific and geographical knowledge, but in terms of penetration southward had reached only 82° 17' and had not traversed the Great Ice Barrier. (Note: The latitude of 82° 17' was accepted at the time. Modern maps and a re-examination of photographs and drawings have indicated that the final position was probably about 82° 11' (Crane 2005, pp. 214–215).)

In 1909, Scott received news that Ernest Shackleton's Nimrod expedition had narrowly failed to reach the Pole. Starting from a base close to Scott's Discovery anchorage in McMurdo Sound, Shackleton had crossed the Great Ice Barrier, discovered the Beardmore Glacier route to the Polar Plateau, and had struck out for the Pole. He had been forced to turn for home at 88° 23' S, less than 100 geographical miles (112 miles (180 km)) from his objective. Scott had claimed the McMurdo Sound area as his own "field of work", and Shackleton's use of the area as a base was in breach of an undertaking he gave Scott. This soured relations between the two explorers, and increased Scott's determination to surpass Shackleton's achievements.

As he made his preparations for a further expedition, Scott was aware of other impending polar ventures. A German Expedition under Wilhelm Filchner announced plans of crossing Antarctica. Filchner met with Scott in May 1910 prior to Scott's departure to settle any possible overlapping activities. Furthermore a Japanese expedition was being planned; the Australasian Antarctic Expedition under Douglas Mawson was to leave in 1911, but would be working in a different sector of the continent; and Roald Amundsen, a potential rival from Norway, had also announced plans for an Arctic voyage.

=== Personnel ===
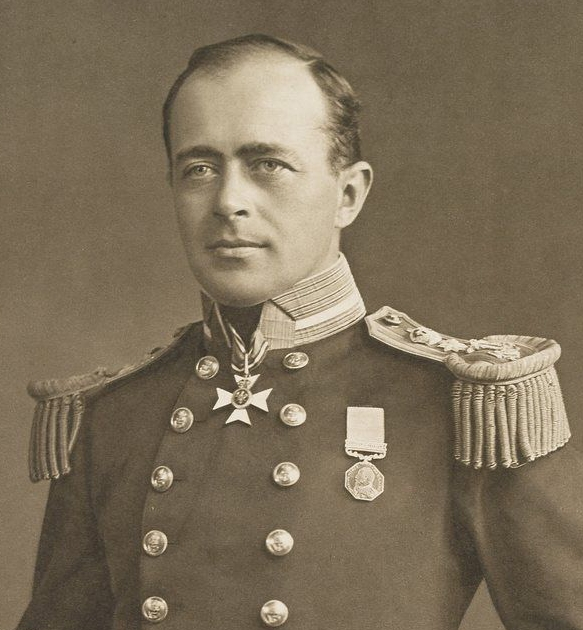
Robert Falcon Scott in 1905

65 men (including replacements) formed the shore and ship's parties of the Terra Nova Expedition. They were chosen from 8,000 applicants, and included seven Discovery veterans together with five who had been with Shackleton on his 1907–1909 expedition. (Note: The Discovery veterans were Scott, Wilson, Edgar Evans, Lashly, Crean, Heald and Wiliamson. The Nimrod veterans were Priestley, Day, Cheetham, Paton and Williams (list of Nimrod personnel in Shackleton 1911, pp. 17–18).) Lieutenant Edward Evans, who had been the navigating officer on Morning, the Discovery Expedition's relief ship in 1904, was appointed Scott's second-in-command. Evans had abandoned plans to mount his own expedition and transferred his financial backing to Scott.

Among the other serving Royal Navy personnel released by the Admiralty were Lieutenant Harry Pennell, who would serve as navigator and take command of Terra Nova once the shore parties had landed; and two Surgeon-Lieutenants, George Murray Levick and Edward L. Atkinson. Ex-Royal Navy officer Victor Campbell, known as "The Wicked Mate", was one of the few who had skills in skiing, and was chosen to lead the party that would explore King Edward VII Land. Two non-Royal Navy officers were appointed: Henry Robertson Bowers ("Birdie"), who was a lieutenant in the Royal Indian Marine, and Lawrence Oates ("Titus"), an Army captain from the 6th (Inniskilling) Dragoons. Oates, independently wealthy, volunteered £1,000 (equivalent to about £102,000 in 2025) and his services to the expedition.

The Admiralty also provided a largely naval lower deck, including the Antarctic veterans Edgar Evans (no relation to Edward Evans), Tom Crean and William Lashly. Other seamen in the shore party included Patrick Keohane, Robert Forde, Thomas Clissold (cook) and Frederick Hooper (domestic steward). Dimitri Gerov (dog driver), a Russian, and Anton Omelchenko (groom), a Ukrainian, also landed.

To head his scientific programme, Scott appointed Edward Wilson ("Bill") as chief scientist. Wilson was Scott's closest confidant among the party; on the Discovery Expedition he had accompanied Scott on the Farthest South march to 80°S. As well as being a qualified medical doctor and a distinguished research zoologist, he was also a talented illustrator. Wilson's scientific team—which Scott's biographer David Crane considered "as impressive a group of scientists as had ever been on a polar expedition"—included some who would enjoy later careers of distinction: meteorologist George Simpson; Canadian physicist Charles Wright; and geologists Frank Debenham and Raymond Priestley. Senior geologist T. Griffith Taylor, biologists Edward W. Nelson and Denis G. Lillie, and assistant zoologist Apsley Cherry-Garrard completed the team.

Cherry-Garrard had no scientific training, but was a protégé of Wilson's. He had, like Oates, contributed £1,000 to funds. After first being turned down by Scott, he allowed his contribution to stand, which impressed Scott sufficiently for him to reverse his decision. Crane describes Cherry-Garrard as "the future interpreter, historian and conscience of the expedition." Herbert Ponting was the expedition's photographer, whose pictures would leave a vivid visual record. On the advice of explorer Fridtjof Nansen, Scott recruited a young Norwegian ski expert, Tryggve Gran.

=== Transport ===
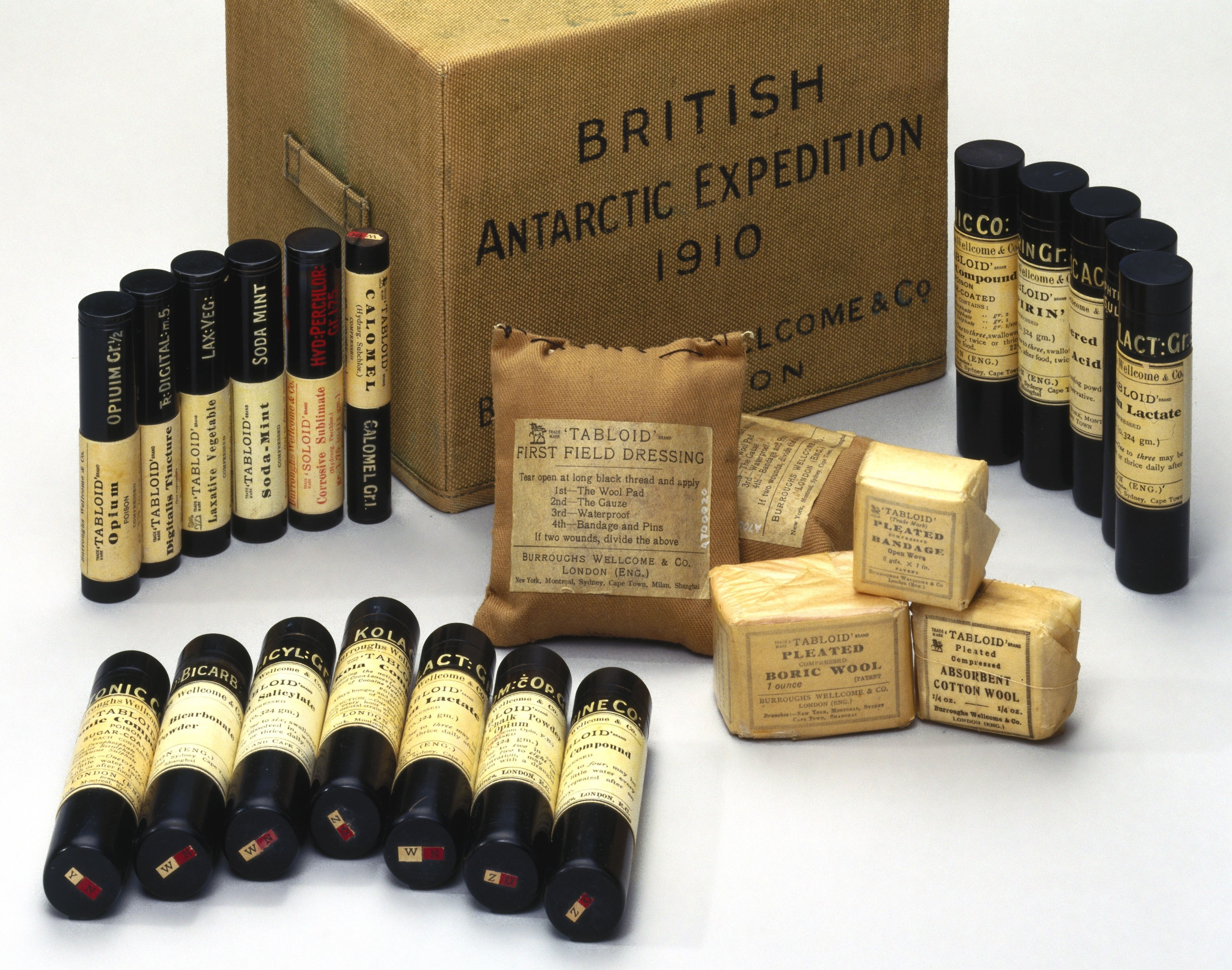
Tabloid medical chest for Scott's Antarctic Expedition, 1910

Scott had decided on a mixed transport strategy, relying on contributions from dogs, motor sledges and ponies. He appointed Cecil Meares to take charge of the dog teams and recruited Shackleton's former motor specialist, Bernard Day, to run the motor sledges. Oates would be in charge of the ponies, but as he could not join the expedition until May 1910, Scott instructed Meares, who knew nothing of horses, to buy them—with unfortunate consequences for their quality and performance.

A "polarised" motor car had been unsuccessfully tried in the Antarctic by Shackleton, on his 1907–1909 expedition, while his pioneering use of ponies had transported him as far as the foot of the Beardmore Glacier. Scott believed that ponies had served Shackleton well, and he thought he could resolve the motor traction problem by developing a tracked snow "motor" (the forerunner of the Snowcat and of the tank). Scott always intended to rely on man-hauling for the Polar Plateau, believing it impossible to ascend the Beardmore Glacier with motors or with animals. The motors and animals would be used to haul loads only across the Barrier, enabling the men to preserve their strength for the later Glacier and Plateau stages. In practice, the motor sledges proved only briefly useful, and the ponies' performance was affected by their age and poor condition. As to dogs, while Scott's experiences on Discovery had made him dubious of their reliability, his writings show that he recognised their effectiveness in the right hands. As the expedition developed, he became increasingly impressed with their capabilities. (Note: During the early, depot-laying stages of the expedition, Scott expresses loss of faith in the dogs (Huxley 1913a, p. 205). In his later diary entries covering the Southern Journey their performance is described as "splendid" (Huxley 1913a, p. 486).)

=== Finance ===
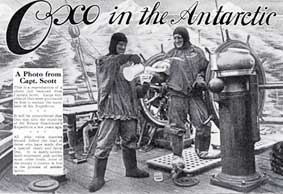
The Oxo food company was one of many commercial sponsors of the expedition.

Unlike the Discovery Expedition, where fundraising was handled jointly by the Royal Society and the Royal Geographical Society (RGS), the Terra Nova Expedition was organised as a private venture without significant institutional support. Scott estimated the total cost at £40,000, half of which was eventually met by a government grant. The balance was raised by public subscription and loans. (Note: The total cost of the expedition was not published. One of Scott's last letters was to Sir Edgar Speyer, the expedition's treasurer; in it, Scott apologises for leaving the finances in "a muddle" (Huxley 1913a, p. 600).) The expedition was further assisted by the free supply of a range of provisions and equipment from sympathetic commercial firms. The fund-raising task was largely carried out by Scott, and was a considerable drain on his time and energy, continuing in South Africa, Australia, and New Zealand after Terra Nova had sailed from British waters.

By far the largest single cost was the purchase of the ship Terra Nova, for £12,500. Terra Nova had been in Antarctica before, as part of the second Discovery relief operation. Scott wanted to sail her as a naval vessel under the White Ensign; to enable this, he obtained membership of the Royal Yacht Squadron for £100. He was thus able to impose naval discipline on the expedition, and as a registered yacht of the Squadron, Terra Nova became exempt from Board of Trade regulations which might otherwise have deemed her unfit to sail.

=== Objectives ===
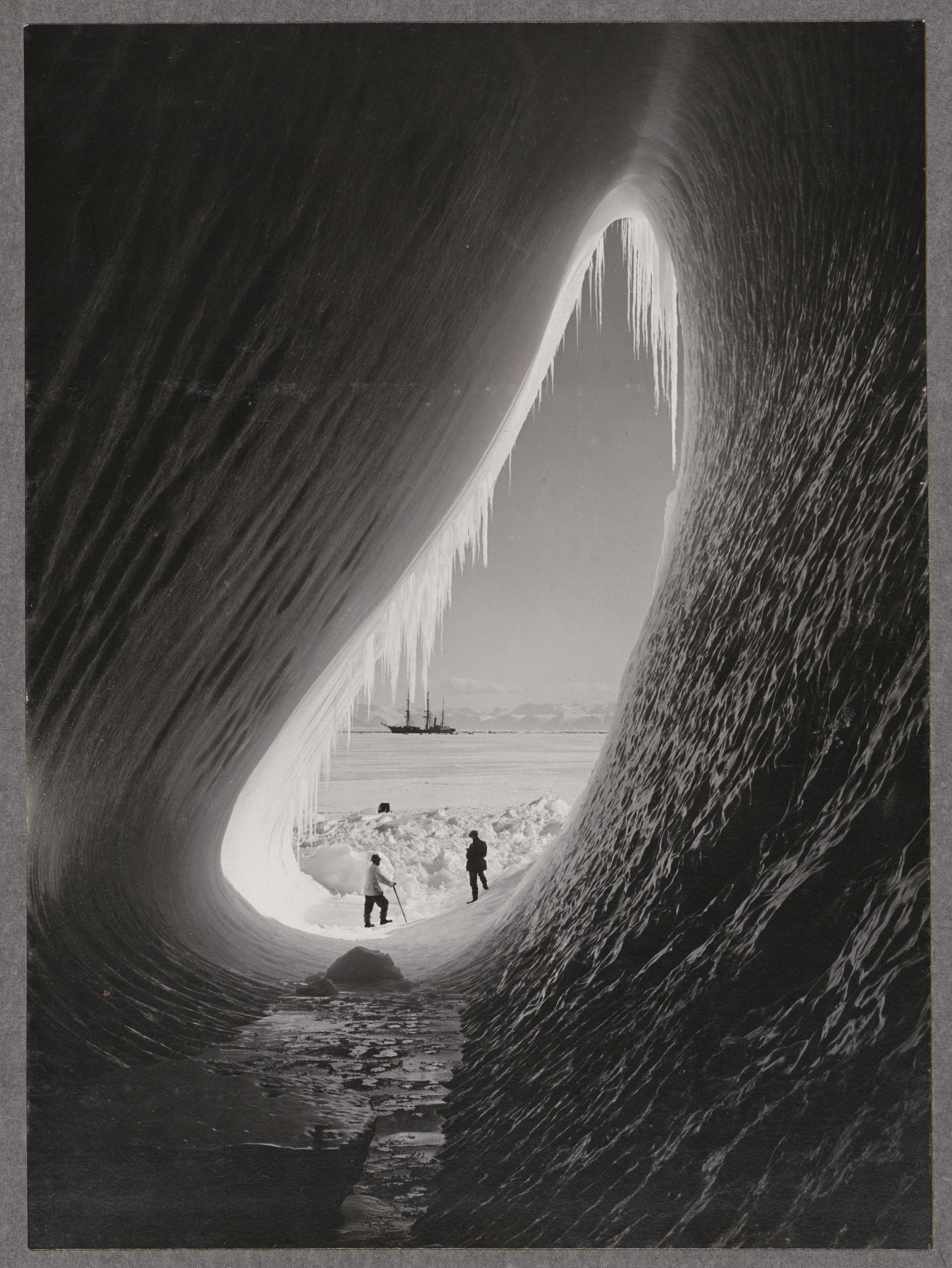
Grotto in an iceberg, 5 January 1911, photographed by Herbert Ponting

Scott defined the objects of the expedition in his initial public appeal: "The main objective of this expedition is to reach the South Pole, and to secure for the British Empire the honour of this achievement." There were other objectives, both scientific and geographical; the scientific work was considered by Wilson as the main work of the expedition: "No one can say that it will have only been a Pole-hunt ... We want the scientific work to make the bagging of the Pole merely an item in the results." He hoped to continue investigations, begun during the Discovery Expedition, of the emperor penguin colony at Cape Crozier and to fulfil a programme of geological, magnetic and meteorology studies on an "unprecedented" scale. There were further plans to explore King Edward VII Land, a venture described by Campbell, who was to lead it, as "the thing of the whole expedition", and Victoria Land.

== First season, 1910–1911 ==
=== Voyage out ===
Terra Nova sailed from Cardiff on 15 June 1910. Scott, detained by expedition business, sailed later on a faster passenger liner and joined the ship in South Africa. In Melbourne he left Terra Nova to continue fund-raising while the ship proceeded to New Zealand. Waiting for Scott in Melbourne was a telegram from Amundsen, informing Scott that the Norwegian was "proceeding south"; (Note: The telegram's exact wording is uncertain. Cherry-Garrard 1970, p. 82, Crane 2005, p. 423, and Preston 1999, p. 127, all report it as a simple, "Am going south". Solomon 2001, p. 64, gives a longer version: "Beg leave to inform you Fram proceeding Antarctica"; Fiennes and Huntford both use this form.) the telegram was the first indication to Scott that he was in a race. When asked by the press for a reaction, Scott replied that his plans would not change and that he would not sacrifice the expedition's scientific goals to win the race to the Pole. In his diary he wrote that Amundsen had a fair chance of success, and perhaps deserved his luck if he got through.

Scott rejoined Terra Nova in New Zealand, where additional supplies were taken aboard, including 34 dogs, 19 Siberian ponies and three motorised sledges. The ship, heavily overloaded, finally left Port Chalmers on 29 November. During the first days of December the ship was struck by a heavy storm; at one point, with the ship taking heavy seas and the pumps having failed, the crew had to bail her out with buckets. The storm resulted in the loss of two ponies, a dog, 10 long tons (10,000 kg) of coal and 65 imperial gallons (300 L) of petrol. On 10 December, Terra Nova met the southern pack ice and was halted, remaining for twenty days before breaking clear and continuing southward. The delay, which Scott attributed to "sheer bad luck", had consumed 6.1 long tons (6,200 kg) of coal.

=== Cape Evans base ===
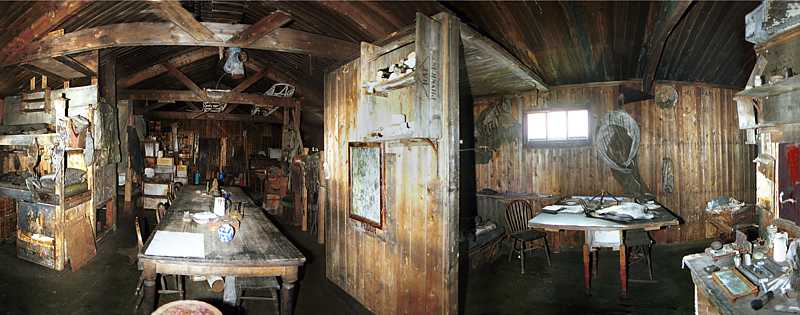
Inside Scott's Hut at Cape Evans

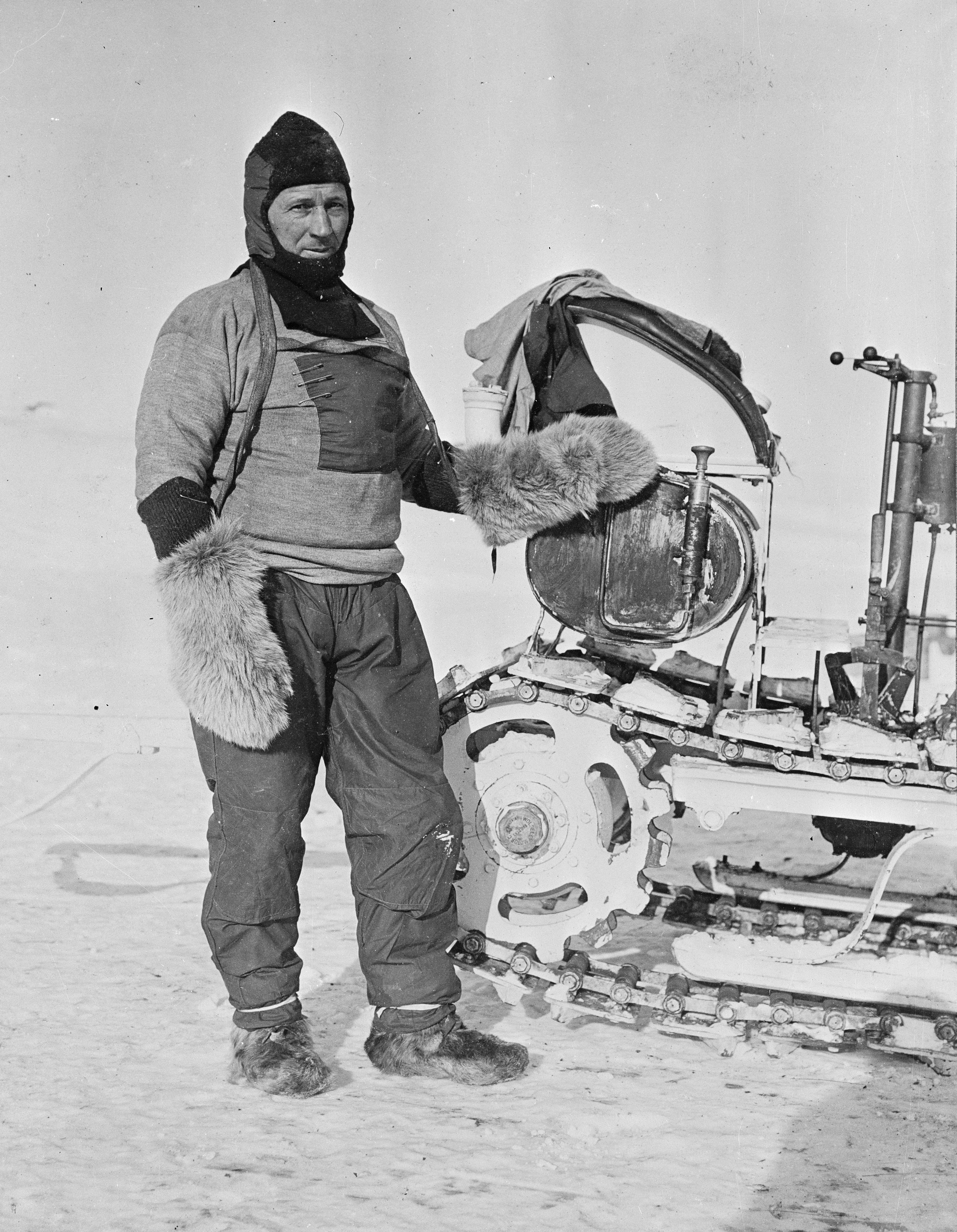
William Lashly by a motor sledge in November 1911.

Terra Nova Expedition motorised sledge built by Wolseley (1910)

Arriving off Ross Island on 4 January 1911, Terra Nova scouted for possible landing sites around Cape Crozier at the eastern point of the island, before proceeding to McMurdo Sound to its west, where both Discovery and Nimrod had previously landed.

After Scott had considered various possible wintering spots, he chose a cape remembered from the Discovery days as the "Skuary", about 15 miles (24 km) north of Scott's 1902 base at Hut Point. Scott hoped that this location, which he renamed Cape Evans after his second-in-command, would be free of ice in the short Antarctic summer, enabling the ship to come and go. As the seas to the south froze over, the expedition would have ready access over the ice to Hut Point and the Barrier.

At Cape Evans the shore parties disembarked, with the ponies, dogs, the three motorised sledges (one of which was lost during unloading), and the bulk of the party's stores. Scott was "astonished at the strength of the ponies" as they transferred stores and materials from ship to shore. A prefabricated accommodation hut measuring 50 by 25 feet (15.2 m × 7.6 m) was erected and made habitable by 18 January.

=== Amundsen's camp ===
Scott's programme included a plan to explore and carry out scientific work in King Edward VII Land, to the east of the Barrier. A party under Campbell was organised for this purpose, with the option of exploring Victoria Land to the north-west if King Edward VII Land proved inaccessible. (Note: Scott's orders to Campbell (Huxley 1913b, pp. 79–82); the party was then called the "Eastern Party".) On 26 January, Campbell's party left in the ship and headed east. After several failed attempts to land his party on the King Edward VII Land shore, Campbell exercised his option to sail to Victoria Land. On its return westward along the Barrier edge, Terra Nova encountered Amundsen's expedition camped in the Bay of Whales, an inlet in the Barrier.

Amundsen was courteous and hospitable, willing for Campbell to camp nearby and offering him help with his dogs. Campbell politely declined, and returned with his party to Cape Evans to report this development. Scott received the news on 22 February, during the first depot-laying expedition. According to Cherry-Garrard, the first reaction of Scott and his party was an urge to rush over to the Bay of Whales and "have it out" with Amundsen. Scott recorded the event calmly in his journal. "One thing only fixes itself in my mind. The proper, as well as the wiser, course is for us to proceed exactly as though this had not happened. To go forward and do our best for the honour of our country without fear or panic."

=== Depot laying ===
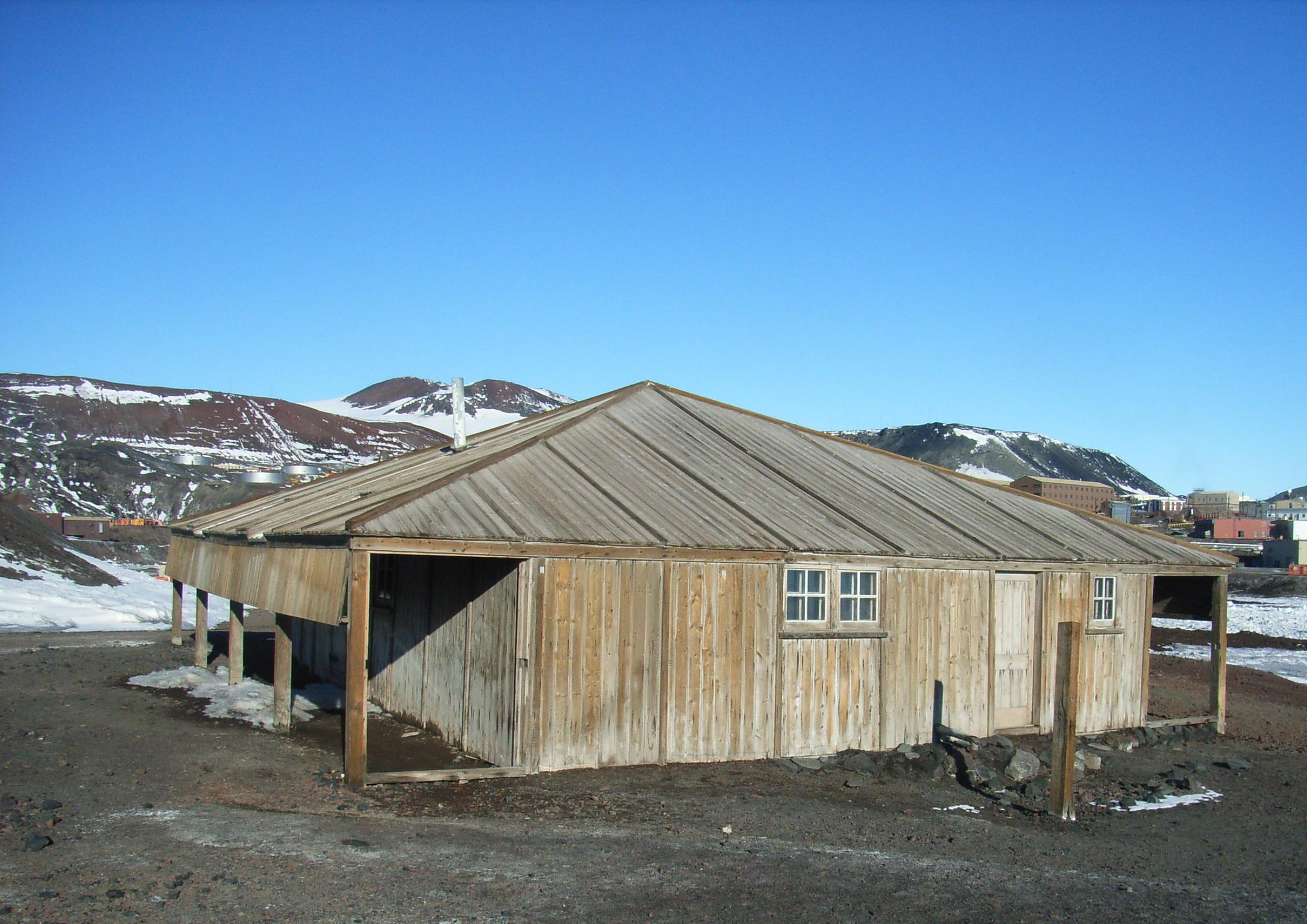
Scott's Discovery hut at Hut Point, used as a shelter and stores depot

The aim of the first season's depot-laying was to place a series of depots on the Barrier from its edge—Safety Camp—down to 80°S, for use on the polar journey which would begin the following spring. The final depot would be the largest, and would be known as One Ton Depot. The work was to be carried out by 12 men, the eight fittest ponies, and two dog teams; ice conditions prevented the use of the motor sledges.

The journey started on 27 January "in a state of hurry bordering on panic", according to Cherry-Garrard. Progress was slower than expected, and the ponies' performance was adversely affected because Oates was opposed to using Norwegian snowshoes and had left them behind at Cape Evans. On 4 February, the party established Corner Camp, 40 miles (64 km) from Hut Point, when a blizzard held them up for three days.

A few days later, after the march had resumed, Scott sent the three weakest ponies home (two died en route). As the depot-laying party approached 80°, he became concerned that the remaining ponies would not make it back to base unless the party turned north immediately. Against the advice of Oates, who wanted to go forward, killing the ponies for meat as they collapsed, Scott decided to lay One Ton Depot at 79°29′S, more than 30 miles (48 km) short of its intended location.

Scott returned to Safety Camp with the dogs, after risking his own life to rescue a dog-team that had fallen into a crevasse. When the slower pony party arrived, one of the animals was in very poor condition and died shortly afterwards. Later, as the surviving ponies were crossing the sea ice near Hut Point, the ice broke up. Despite a determined rescue attempt, three more ponies died. Of the eight ponies that had begun the depot-laying journey, only two returned home.

=== Winter quarters ===
On 23 April, the sun set for the duration of the winter months, and the party settled into the Cape Evans hut. Under Scott's naval regime the hut was divided by a wall made of packing cases, so that officers and men lived largely separate existences, scientists being deemed "officers" for this purpose. Everybody was kept busy; scientific work continued, observations and measurements were taken, equipment was overhauled and adapted for future journeys. The surviving ponies needed daily exercise, and the dogs required regular attention. Scott spent much time calculating sledging rations and weights for the forthcoming polar march. The routine included regular lectures on a wide range of subjects: Ponting on Japan, Wilson on sketching, Oates on horse management and geologist Debenham on volcanoes.

To ensure that physical fitness was maintained there were frequent games of football in the half-light outside the hut; Scott recorded that, "Atkinson is by far the best player, but Hooper, P.O. Evans and Crean are also quite good." The South Polar Times, which had been produced by Shackleton during the Discovery Expedition, was resurrected under Cherry-Garrard's editorship. On 6 June, a feast was arranged to mark Scott's 43rd birthday; a second celebration on 21 June marked Midwinter Day, the day that marks the midpoint of the long polar night.

== Main expedition journeys, 1911–1912 ==
=== Northern Party ===
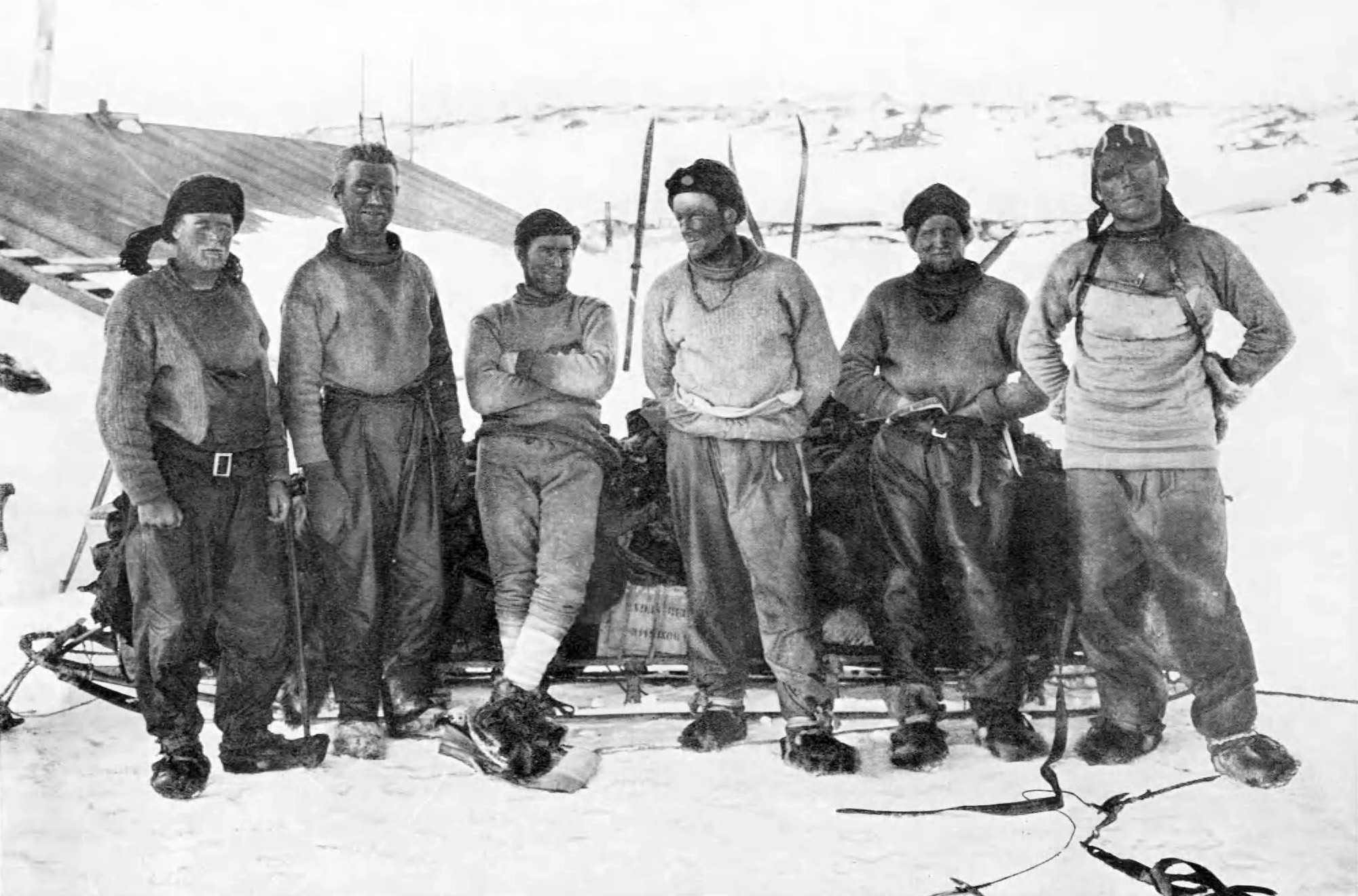
The Northern Party of the Terra Nova Expedition upon returning to Cape Evans, November 7, 1912 (from left): Harry Dickason, George P. Abbott, Frank V. Browning, Victor Campbell, Raymond Priestley, George M. Levick

After reporting Amundsen's arrival to Scott at Cape Evans, Campbell's Eastern party (Campbell, Priestley, Levick, George P. Abbott, Harry Dickason) and Frank V. Browning became the "Northern Party". On 9 February 1911 they sailed northwards, arriving at Robertson Bay, near Cape Adare on 17 February, where they built a hut close to Norwegian explorer Carstens Borchgrevink's old quarters.

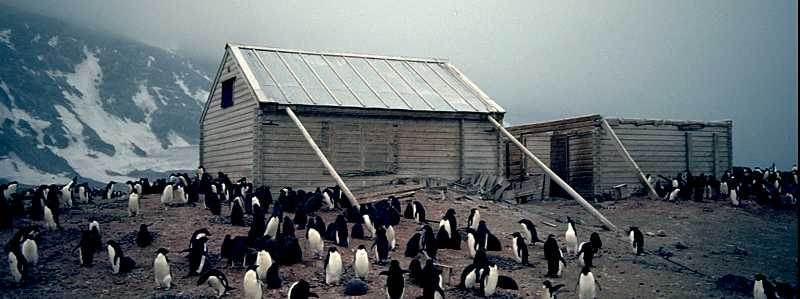
Borchgrevink's 1899 hut at Cape Adare photographed in 1992. Campbell's Northern Party camped nearby in 1911–1912.

The Northern Party spent the 1911 winter in their hut. Their exploration plans for the summer of 1911–1912 could not be fully carried out, partly because of the condition of the sea ice and also because they were unable to discover a route into the interior. Terra Nova returned from New Zealand on 4 January 1912, and transferred the party to the vicinity of Evans Cove, a location approximately 250 miles (400 km) south of Cape Adare and 200 miles (320 km) northwest of Cape Evans. They were to be picked up on 18 February after the completion of further geological work, but due to heavy pack ice, the ship was unable to reach them. The group, with meagre rations which they had to supplement by fish and seal meat, were forced to spend the winter months of 1912 in a snow cave which they excavated on Inexpressible Island. Here they suffered severe privations—frostbite, dysentery and hunger, with extreme winds and low temperatures, and the discomfort of a blubber stove in confined quarters.

On 17 April 1912 a party under Atkinson, in command at Cape Evans during the absence of the polar party, went to relieve Campbell's party but were beaten back by the weather. The Northern Party survived the winter in their icy chamber, and set out for the base camp on 30 September 1912. Despite their physical weakness, the whole party managed to reach Cape Evans on 7 November, after a perilous journey which included a crossing of the difficult Drygalski Ice Tongue. Geological and other specimens collected by the Northern Party were retrieved from Cape Adare and Evans Cove by Terra Nova in January 1913.

=== Western geological parties ===
==== First geological expedition, January–March 1911 ====
The objective of this journey was geological exploration of the coastal area west of McMurdo Sound, in a region between the McMurdo Dry Valleys and the Koettlitz Glacier. This work was undertaken by a party consisting of Taylor, Debenham, Wright and Edgar Evans. They landed from Terra Nova on 26 January at Butter Point, (Note: Butter Point was named after a depot containing butter was left there during the Discovery Expedition (Huxley 1913b, p. 183).) opposite Cape Evans on the Victoria Land shore. On 30 January, the party established its main depot in the Ferrar Glacier region, and then conducted explorations and survey work in the Dry Valley and Taylor Glacier areas before moving southwards to the Koettlitz Glacier. After further work there, they started homewards on 2 March, taking a southerly route to Hut Point, where they arrived on 14 March.

==== Second geological expedition, November 1911 – February 1912 ====
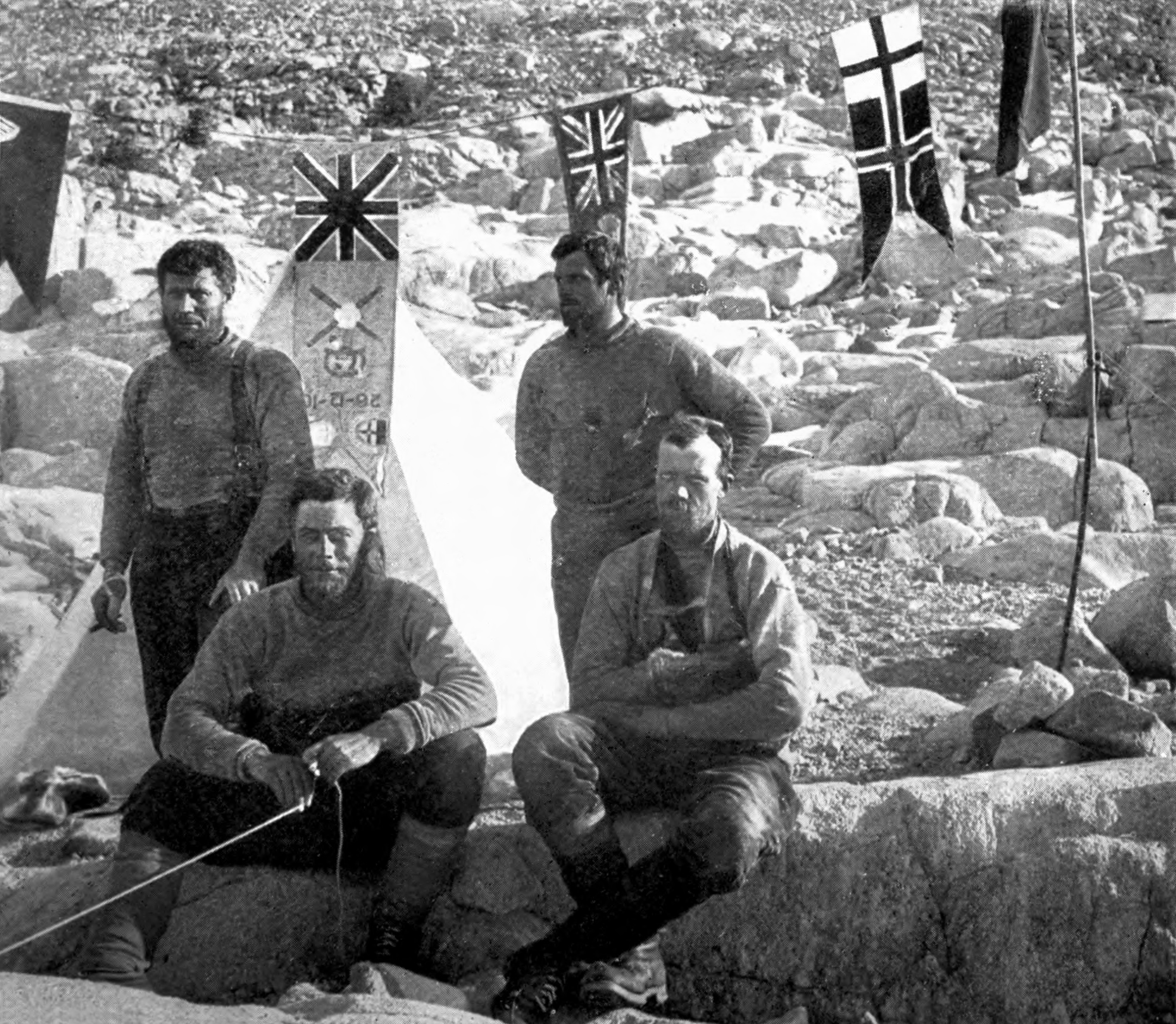
The Second Western Party at Cape Geology, Granite Harbour, Christmas Day 1911. Standing: Robert Forde, Tryggve Gran. Seated: Frank Debenham, Thomas Griffith Taylor.

This was a continuation of the work carried out in the earlier journey, this time concentrating on Granite Harbour region approximately 50 miles (80 km) north of Butter Point. Taylor's companions this time were Debenham, Gran and Forde. The main journey began on 14 November and involved difficult travel over sea ice to Granite Harbour, which was reached on 26 November. Headquarters were established at a site christened Geology Point, and a stone hut was built. During the following weeks, exploration and surveying work took place on the Mackay Glacier, and a range of features to the north of the glacier were identified and named.

The party was due to be picked up by Terra Nova on 15 January 1912, but the ship could not reach them. The party waited until 5 February before trekking southward, and were rescued from the ice when they were finally spotted from the ship on 18 February. Geological specimens from both Western Mountains expeditions were retrieved by Terra Nova in January 1913.

=== Winter journey to Cape Crozier ===
This journey was conceived by Wilson. He had suggested the need for it in the Zoology section of the Discovery Expedition's Scientific Reports, and was anxious to follow up this earlier research. The journey's scientific purpose was to secure emperor penguin eggs from the rookery near Cape Crozier at an early embryo stage, so that "particular points in the development of the bird could be worked out". This required a trip in the depths of winter to obtain eggs in an appropriately early stage of incubation. A secondary purpose was to experiment with food rations and equipment in advance of the coming summer's polar journey. Scott approved, and a party consisting of Wilson, Bowers and Cherry-Garrard set out on 27 June 1911.

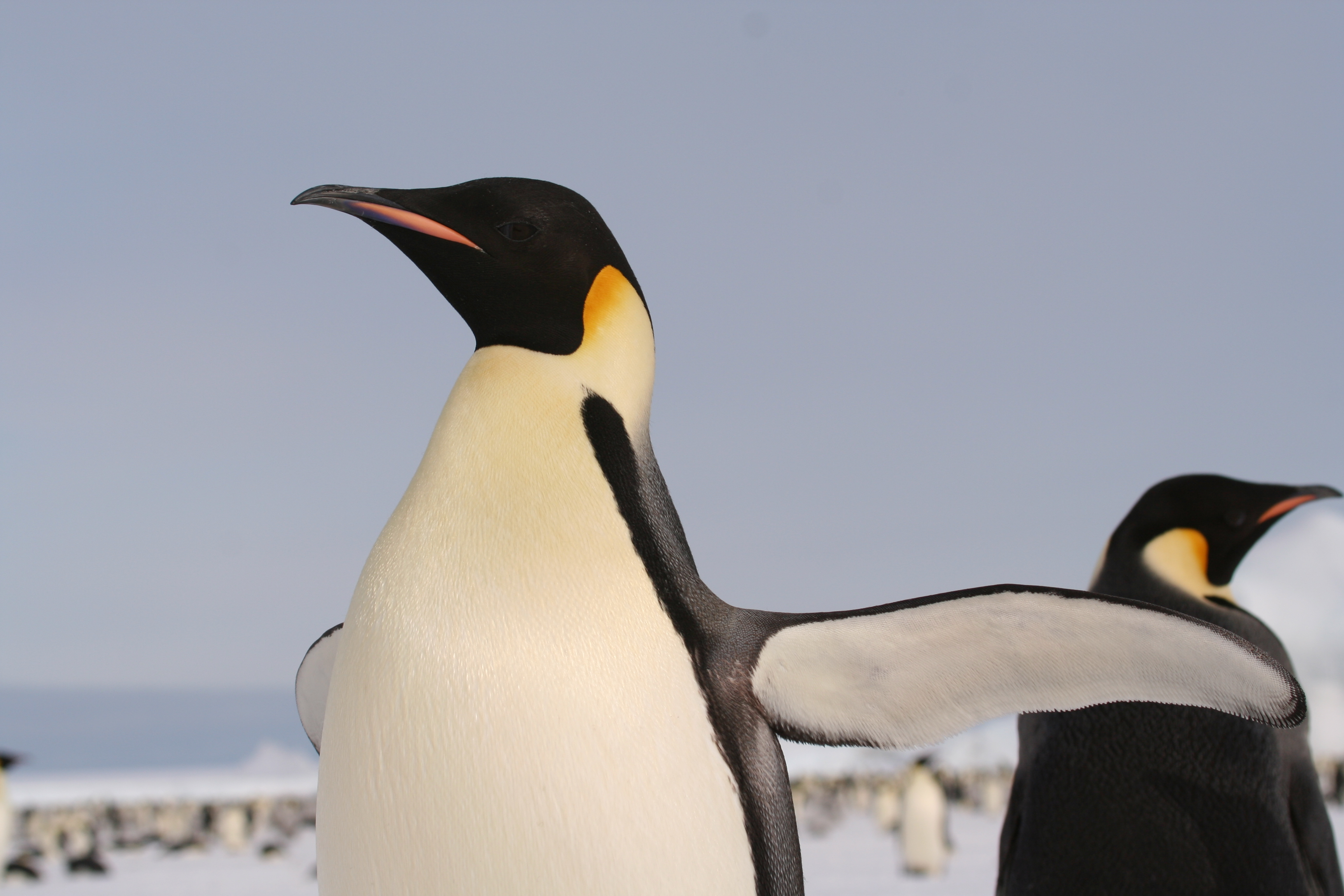
Emperor penguins

Travelling during the Antarctic winter had not been previously tried; Scott wrote that it was "a bold venture, but the right men have gone to attempt it." Cherry-Garrard later described the horrors of the 19 days it took to travel the 60 miles (97 km) to Cape Crozier. Gear, clothes, and sleeping bags were constantly iced up; on 5 July, the temperature fell below −77 °F (−61 °C)—"109 degrees of frost—as cold as anyone would want to endure in darkness and iced up clothes", wrote Cherry-Garrard. Often the daily distance travelled was little more than a single mile.

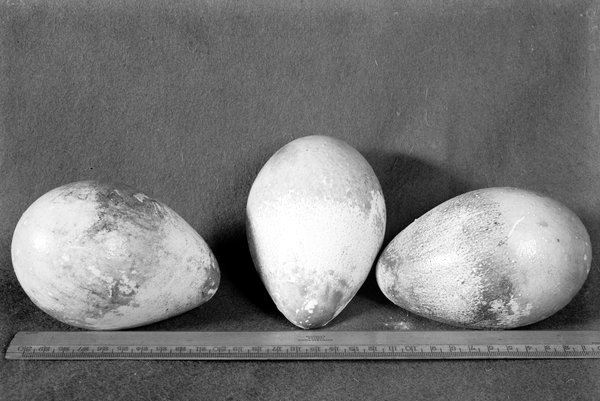
The collected eggs

After reaching Cape Crozier on 15 July, the party built an igloo from snow blocks, stone, and a sheet of canvas they had brought for the roof. They were then able to visit the penguin colony and collect several emperor penguin eggs. Subsequently, their igloo shelter was almost destroyed in a blizzard with winds of force 11 on the Beaufort scale. The storm also carried away the tent upon which their survival would depend during their return journey, but fortunately this was recovered half a mile away. The group set out on the return journey to Cape Evans, arriving there on 1 August. The three eggs that survived the journey went first to the Natural History Museum in South Kensington, and thereafter were the subject of a report from Cossar Stewart at the University of Edinburgh. The eggs failed to support Wilson's theories.

Cherry-Garrard afterwards described this as the "worst journey in the world", and used this as the title of the book that he wrote about the expedition. Scott called the Winter Journey "a very wonderful performance", and was highly satisfied with the experiments in rations and equipment: "We are as near perfection as experience can direct."

=== South polar journey ===
==== The Barrier: southward ====
South Polar journey
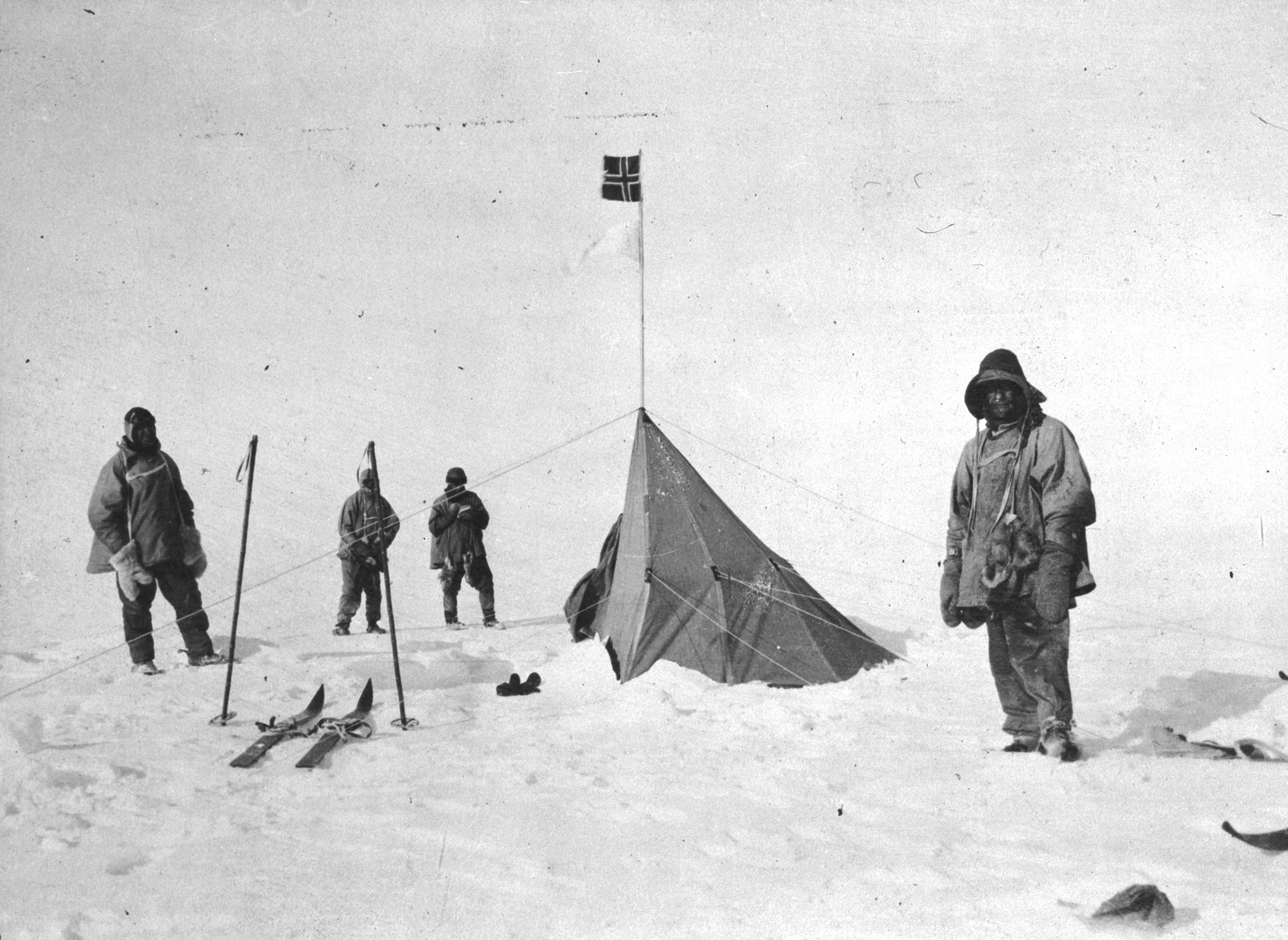
- Scott, Bowers, Wilson, and Edgar Evans at Amundsen's base at the South Pole
- Leader: Robert Falcon Scott
- Start: Cape Evans base 1 November 1911
- End: 11 mi (18 km) S of One Ton Depot; 29 March 1912
- Goal: First to reach the South Pole
- Crew: Robert Falcon Scott; Edward Adrian Wilson; Lawrence Oates; Henry Robertson Bowers; Edgar Evans
- Fatalities: 5

Route
- Scott's route compared to Amundsen's

On 13 September 1911, Scott revealed his plans for the South Pole march. Sixteen men would set out, using the two remaining motor sledges, ponies and dogs for the Barrier stage of the journey, which would bring them to the Beardmore Glacier. At this point the dogs would return to base and the ponies would be shot for food. Thereafter, 12 men in three groups would ascend the glacier and begin the crossing of the polar plateau, using man-hauling. Only one of these groups would carry on to the pole; the supporting groups would be sent back at specified latitudes. The composition of the final polar group would be decided by Scott during the journey. For the return journey, Scott ordered that the dog teams set off again from the base camp to replenish depots and meet the polar party between latitude 82 and 82.30 on 1 March to assist the party home.

The motor party, consisting of Lieutenant Evans, Day, Lashly, and Hooper, started from Cape Evans on 24 October, with two motor sledges, their objective being to haul loads to latitude 80° 30' S and wait there for the others. By 1 November, both motor sledges had failed after little more than 50 miles (80 km) of travel, so the party man-hauled 740 pounds (336 kg) of supplies for the remaining 150 miles (240 km) reaching their assigned latitude two weeks later. Scott's main party, which had left Cape Evans on 1 November with the dogs and ponies, caught up with them on 21 November.

Scott's initial plan was that the dogs would return to base at this stage. Because of slower than expected progress, he decided to take the dogs on further. Day and Hooper were dispatched to Cape Evans with a message to this effect for Simpson, who had been left in charge there. On 4 December, the expedition had reached the Gateway, the name given by Shackleton to the route from the Barrier on to the Beardmore Glacier. At this point a blizzard struck, forcing the men to camp until 9 December, and to break into rations intended for the Glacier journey. When the blizzard lifted, the remaining ponies were shot as planned, and their meat deposited as food for the return parties. On 11 December, Meares and Dimitri turned back with the dogs, carrying a message back to base that "things were not as rosy as they might be, but we keep our spirits up and say the luck must turn."

==== Beardmore ascent ====
The party began the ascent of the Beardmore, and on 20 December, reached the beginning of the polar plateau where they laid the Upper Glacier Depot. There was still no hint from Scott as to who would be in the final polar party. On 22 December, at latitude 85° 20' S, Scott sent back Atkinson, Cherry-Garrard, Wright and Keohane. Scott reminded Atkinson "to take the two dog-teams south in the event of Meares having to return home, as seemed likely" to assist the polar party on its return journey the following March.

The remaining eight men continued south, in better conditions which enabled them to make up some of the time lost on the Barrier. By 30 December, they had "caught up" with Shackleton's 1908–1909 timetable. On 3 January 1912, at latitude 87° 32' S, Scott made his decision on the composition of the polar party: five men (Scott, Wilson, Oates, Bowers and Edgar Evans) would go forward while Lieutenant Evans, Lashly and Crean would return to Cape Evans. The decision to take five men forward involved recalculations of weights and rations, since everything had been based on four-men teams.

==== South Pole ====
The polar group continued towards the Pole, passing Shackleton's Farthest South (88° 23' S) on 9 January. Seven days later, about 15 miles (25 km) from their goal, Amundsen's black flag was spotted and the party knew that they had been forestalled. They reached the Pole the next day, 17 January: "The Pole. Yes, but under very different circumstances from those expected ... Great God! This is an awful place and terrible enough for us to have laboured to it without the reward of priority. Well, it is something to have got here."

Scott still hoped to race Amundsen to the telegraph cablehead in Australia: "Now for a desperate struggle to get the news through first. I wonder if we can do it." On 18 January they discovered Amundsen's tent, some supplies, a letter to King Haakon VII of Norway (which Amundsen politely asked Scott to deliver), and a note stating that Amundsen had arrived there with four companions on 14 December 1911.

==== The last march ====
After confirming their position and planting their flag, Scott's party turned homewards. During the next three weeks they made good progress, Scott's diary recording several "excellent marches". Nevertheless, Scott began to worry about the physical condition of his party, particularly of Edgar Evans, who was suffering from severe frostbite and was, Scott records, "a good deal run down". The condition of Oates's feet became an increasing anxiety as the group approached the summit of the Beardmore Glacier and prepared for the descent to the Barrier. On 7 February, they began their descent and had serious difficulty locating a depot. In a brief spell of good weather, Scott ordered a half-day's rest, allowing Wilson to "geologise"; 30 pounds (14 kg) of fossil-bearing samples were added to the sledges. These plant fossils were later used to support the theory of continental drift. Evans's health was deteriorating; a hand injury was failing to heal, he was badly frostbitten, and he is thought to have injured his head after several falls on the ice. "He is absolutely changed from his normal self-reliant self", wrote Scott. Near the bottom of the glacier Evans collapsed, and died on 17 February.

On the Barrier stage of the homeward march, Scott reached the 82° 30' S meeting point for the dog teams, three days ahead of schedule, noting in his diary for 27 February 1912: "We are naturally always discussing possibility of meeting dogs, where and when, etc. It is a critical position. We may find ourselves in safety at the next depot, but there is a horrid element of doubt." The party then met with three, ultimately critical, difficulties: the non-appearance of the dog teams, an unexpected large drop in temperature and a shortage of fuel in the depots. The low temperatures caused poor surfaces which Scott likened to "pulling over desert sand"; he described the surface as "coated with a thin layer of woolly crystals, formed by radiation no doubt. These are too firmly fixed to be removed by the wind and cause impossible friction on the [sledge] runners." The low temperatures were accompanied by an absence of wind, something Scott had expected to assist them on their northern journey.

The party were further slowed down by the frostbite in Oates' left foot. Daily marches were now down to less than five miles (8 km), which was insufficient given the lack of oil. By March 10, it became evident the dog teams were not coming: "The dogs which would have been our salvation have evidently failed. Meares [the dog-driver] had a bad trip home I suppose." In a farewell letter to Sir Edgar Speyer, dated March 16, Scott wondered whether he had overshot the meeting point and fought the growing suspicion that he had in fact been abandoned by the dog teams: "We very nearly came through, and it's a pity to have missed it, but lately I have felt that we have overshot our mark. No-one is to blame and I hope no attempt will be made to suggest that we had lacked support." On the same day, Oates, who "now with hands as well as feet pretty well useless", voluntarily left the tent and walked to his death. Scott wrote that Oates' last words were, "I am just going outside and may be some time".

==== Eleven miles ====
Oates' sacrifice increased the team's speed but it was too late to save them, especially since Scott's right toes were now becoming frostbitten. Scott, Wilson and Bowers struggled on to a point 11 miles (18 km) south of One Ton Depot, but were halted on 20 March, by a fierce blizzard. Although each day they attempted to advance, they were unable to do so. Scott's last diary entry, dated 29 March 1912, the presumed date of their deaths, ends with these words:

Every day we have been ready to start for our depot 11 miles away, but outside the door of the tent it remains a scene of whirling drift. I do not think we can hope for any better things now. We shall stick it out to the end, but we are getting weaker, of course, and the end cannot be far. It seems a pity but I do not think I can write more. R. Scott. Last entry. For God's sake look after our people.

== Attempts to relieve the polar party, 1912 ==
=== Orders concerning dogs ===
In 2012, Karen May at the Scott Polar Research Institute re-discovered the following facts. In 1921, Edward Evans revealed in his book South with Scott that Scott had left the following written orders at Cape Evans dated 20 October 1911, to secure Scott's speedy return from the pole using dogs:

About the first week of February I should like you to start your third journey to the South, the object being to hasten the return of the third Southern unit [the polar party] and give it a chance to catch the ship. The date of your departure must depend on news received from returning units, the extent of the depot of dog food you have been able to leave at One Ton Camp, the state of the dogs, etc ... It looks at present as though you should aim at meeting the returning party about March 1 in Latitude 82 or 82.30

You will of course understand that whilst the object of the third journey is important that of the second is vital. At all hazards three X.S. units of provision must be got to One Ton Camp by the date named [January 19th], and if the dogs are unable to perform this service, a man party must be organised. (Signed) R. F. Scott.

This order was ultimately not carried out.

Expedition member Apsley Cherry-Garrard initially omitted mentioning Scott's order in his 1922 book The Worst Journey in the World. However, in the 1948 preface to his book, also rediscovered in 2012, he admits to the existence of Scott's order, and explains the order could not have been carried out because insufficient dog food had been laid out (this was Cecil Meares's responsibility, being the dog-driver and the recipient of Scott's order) and because one of the base camp team, Atkinson, was too exhausted at the specified time of departure.

Before setting out on the South Pole journey, Scott had made arrangements intended to help the polar party home with the use of dogs. Meares, who was expected to have returned to Cape Evans by 19 December, had been instructed that in late December or early January he should transport to One Ton Depot "Five XS rations [XS = "Extra Summit Ration", food for four men for one week], 3 cases of biscuit, 5 gallons of oil and as much dog food as you can conveniently carry". If this mission could not be carried out by dogs, then "at all hazard" a man-hauling team was to carry the XS rations to the depot. Meares had been further instructed that in about the first week in February, depending on news received from returning units, he should set out, with dogs, with a view to meeting the returning polar party between latitudes 82° or 82°30' on about 1 March. The objective of these orders was to hasten the party back to Cape Evans before Terra Nova left so that news of the polar conquest could be carried immediately to New Zealand. Scott placed greater emphasis on the former journey than on the latter: "Whilst the object of your third journey is important, that of the second is vital". The substance of these orders was reiterated to Atkinson when he left Scott at the top of the Beardmore Glacier on 22 December 1911.

Several events occurred to obscure and ultimately frustrate this order. The fact that Meares had turned back from the polar march much later than originally planned meant that he did not return to Cape Evans until 5 January. Huntford suggests he resigned at this point because he was "disgusted" with Scott's expedition. Fiennes in contrast quotes from a letter by Cherry-Garrard in 1938 that Meares had been ready at Cape Evans to resupply One Ton Depot as ordered, when he had seen the ship arrive in the bay and so stayed at base—the "ship" turned out to be a mirage, and the real ship did not arrive until mid-February. According to Fiennes, Meares was preoccupied with his late father's estate and was anxious to leave on the ship as soon as he could. Three of the XS rations required for One Ton Depot had been man-hauled there by a party which left Cape Evans on 26 December, but neither Meares nor anyone else transported the missing rations or the dog food to One Ton Depot.

=== Atkinson's aborted journey to meet Scott ===
When Atkinson arrived back at Cape Evans from the Beardmore Glacier at the end of January, he was the senior officer present and thus in command of the base camp, a role to which he was not accustomed. Terra Nova arrived from her winter mooring in New Zealand on 9 February, and instead of setting off for Scott, Atkinson used the shore party for the arduous task of unloading the ship—a mistake, Cherry-Garrard thought, since these men might be required to sledge again. Belatedly, on 13 February, Atkinson set out with Dimitri Gerov and the dog teams for the scheduled meeting with Scott on the Barrier, reaching Hut Point 13 miles (21 km) south before being delayed by bad weather.

During the final returning party's journey, Lieutenant Evans had become seriously ill with scurvy. After One Ton Depot he was unable to march, and was carried on the sledge by Crean and Lashly to a point 35 miles (56 km) south of Hut Point. At that point he appeared likely to die. On 18 February, Crean walked on alone to reach Hut Point (covering 35 miles (56 km) of difficult terrain in only 18 hours), where he found Atkinson and Dimitri with their dogs, pausing in their journey to meet Scott. Atkinson diverted his attention to the rescue of Evans, whom he brought to Hut Point, barely alive, on 22 February. From that point, Atkinson's priority was to bring Evans to the safety of the ship.

=== Cherry-Garrard's journey to One Ton Depot ===
With Atkinson thus occupied, an alternative arrangement to pick up Scott was necessary. Disregarding Meares, who was "not available for work", the most qualified person available to meet Scott's party was the physicist Wright, an experienced traveller and navigator, but the chief scientist Simpson insisted Wright's scientific work be given priority. Atkinson therefore chose Cherry-Garrard, who would be accompanied by Dimitri. Atkinson then decided to send the short-sighted Cherry-Garrard on 25 February, who was not able to navigate, only as far as One Ton depot (which is within sight of Mount Erebus), effectively cancelling Scott's orders for meeting him at latitude 82 or 82.30 on 1 March. Lieutenant Evans wrote later that he thought Scott would have approved the decision to keep Wright at the base camp.

In his 1922 book The Worst Journey, Cherry-Garrard recalled the controversial verbal orders given by Atkinson. He was to travel to One Ton Depot as fast as possible, where he was to leave food for the returning polar party. If Scott had not arrived before him, Cherry-Garrard should decide "what to do". Atkinson also emphasised that this was not a rescue party, and added that Scott had given instructions that the dogs were "not to be risked in view of the sledging plans for next season". In the standard edition of his book, Cherry-Garrard omitted any mention of Scott's request to be picked up at 82° or 82°30' on 1 March. But after Atkinson's and Lady Scott's deaths in 1929 and 1947 respectively, in a postscript to his privately published 1948 edition, Cherry-Garrard acknowledged the existence of Scott's order and provided reasons why Atkinson, and later he himself, failed to comply: Atkinson was too exhausted at the beginning of February to set off to meet Scott, and the lack of dog food at One Ton Depot made a timely start impractical. Karen May of the Scott Polar Research Institute goes further by suggesting that the instruction about saving the dogs for the following season was Atkinson's own invention.

Cherry-Garrard left Hut Point with Dimitri and two dog teams on 26 February, arriving at One Ton Depot on 4 March and depositing the extra rations. Scott was not there. With supplies for themselves and the dogs for twenty-four days, they had about eight days' time before having to return to Hut Point. The alternative to waiting was moving southwards for another four days. Any travel beyond that, in the absence of the dog food depot, would mean killing dogs for dog food as they went along, thus breaching Atkinson's "not to be risked" order. Cherry-Garrard argued that the weather was too poor for further travel, with daytime temperatures as low as −37 °F (−38 °C), and that he might miss Scott if leaving the depot, and thus decided to wait for Scott. On 10 March, in worsening weather and with his own supplies dwindling, Cherry-Garrard turned for home. Meanwhile, Scott's team were fighting for their lives less than 70 miles (113 km) away. Atkinson would later write, "I am satisfied that no other officer of the expedition could have done better". Cherry-Garrard was troubled for the rest of his life by thoughts that he might have taken other actions that could have saved the polar party.

=== Atkinson's final relief effort ===
When Cherry-Garrard returned from One Ton Depot without Scott's party, anxieties rose. Atkinson, now in charge at Cape Evans as the senior naval officer present, (Note: Lieutenant Evans had departed with the Terra Nova in March 1912 (Crane 2005, p. 556).) decided to make another attempt to reach the polar party when the weather permitted, and on 26 March set out with Keohane, man-hauling a sledge containing 18 days' provisions. In very low temperatures (−40 °F (−40 °C)) they had reached Corner Camp by 30 March, when, in Atkinson's view, the weather, the cold and the time of year made further progress south impossible. Atkinson recorded, "In my own mind I was morally certain that the [polar] party had perished".

== Search party, October 1912 ==
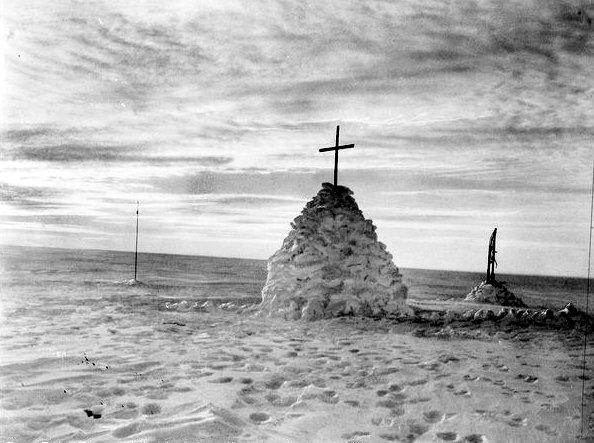
Grave of the Southern party

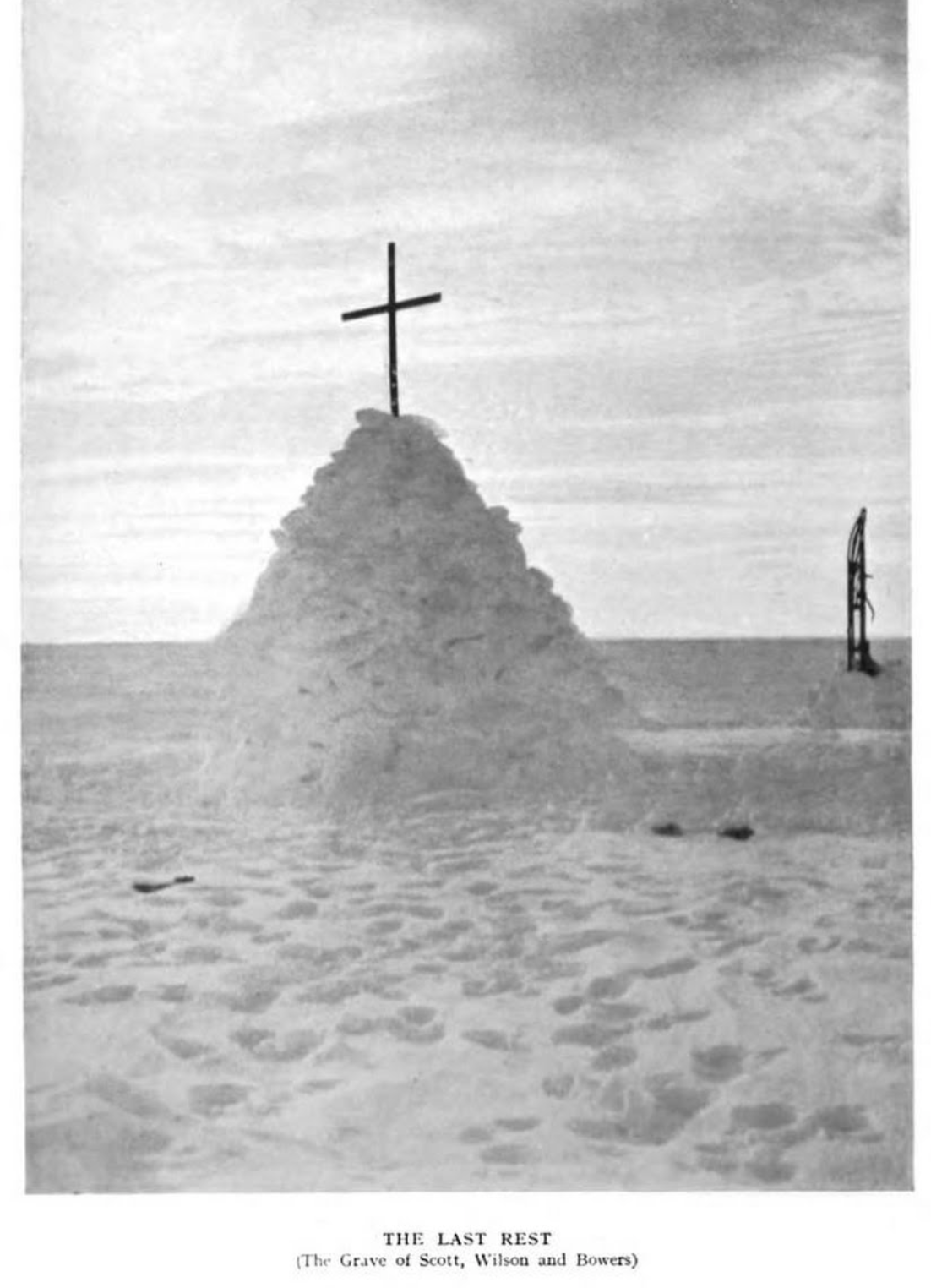
Cairn over the tent containing the bodies of Edward Adrian Wilson, Henry Robertson Bowers and Robert Falcon Scott

The remaining expedition members still at Cape Evans waited through the winter, continuing their scientific work. In the spring Atkinson had to consider whether efforts should first be directed to the rescue of Campbell's Northern Party, or to establishing if possible the fate of the polar party. A meeting of the whole group decided that they should first search for signs of Scott. The party set out on 29 October, accompanied by a team of mules that had been landed from Terra Nova during its resupply visit the previous summer. On 12 November the party found the tent containing the frozen bodies of Scott, Wilson and Bowers, 11 miles (18 km) south of One Ton Depot. Atkinson read the relevant portions of Scott's diaries, and the nature of the disaster was revealed. After diaries, personal effects and records had been collected, the tent was collapsed over the bodies and a cairn of snow erected, topped by a cross fashioned from Gran's skis. The party searched further south for Oates's body, but found only his sleeping bag. On 15 November, they raised a cairn near to where they believed he had died.

On returning to Hut Point on 25 November, the search party found that the Northern Party had rescued itself and had returned safely to base. Early in the morning of 10 February 1913, Atkinson and Pennell rowed into the New Zealand port of Oamaru, from where they sent a coded message back to the expedition's New Zealand agent, Joseph Kinsey, informing him of the fate of Scott and his party. Atkinson and Pennell then boarded a train to meet Terra Nova in Lyttelton near Christchurch.

== Aftermath ==
As Campbell was now the senior naval officer of the expedition, he assumed command for its final weeks until the arrival of Terra Nova on 18 January 1913. Before the final departure a large wooden cross was erected on the slopes of Observation Hill, overlooking Hut Point, inscribed with the five names of the dead and a quotation from Tennyson's Ulysses: "To strive, to seek, to find, and not to yield".

The loss of Scott and his party overshadowed all else in the British public's mind, including Amundsen's feat in being first at the Pole. For many years the image of Scott as a tragic hero, beyond reproach, remained almost unchallenged, for although there were rifts among some who were close to the expedition, including relatives of those who died, this disharmony was not public. There was no real change in public perceptions until the 1970s, by which time nearly all those directly concerned with the expedition were dead.

Controversy was ignited with the publication of Roland Huntford's book Scott and Amundsen (1979, re-published and televised in 1985 as The Last Place on Earth). Huntford was critical of Scott's supposedly authoritarian leadership style and of his poor judgment of men, and blamed him for a series of organisational failures that led to the death of everyone in the polar party. Scott's personal standing suffered from these attacks; efforts to restore his reputation have included the account by Ranulph Fiennes (a direct rebuttal of Huntford's version), Susan Solomon's scientific analysis of the weather conditions that ultimately defeated Scott, David Cranes's 2005 biography of Scott, and Karen May's new analysis of Scott's disobeyed orders specifying that the dog teams transport his returning party swiftly back to the base camp.

In comparing the achievements of Scott and Amundsen, most polar historians generally accept that Amundsen's skills with ski and dogs, his general familiarity with ice conditions, and his clear focus on a non-scientific expedition gave him considerable advantages in the race for the Pole. Scott's verdict on the disaster that overtook his party, written when he was close to death, lists the initial loss of pony transport, weather conditions, "a shortage of fuel in our depots for which I cannot account", and the sickening of Evans and Oates, but ultimately Scott concludes that "our wreck is certainly due to this sudden advent of severe weather [...] on the Barrier [...] −30 °F (−34 °C) in the day, −47 °F (−44 °C) at night". Presumably with regard to the failed rendezvous with the dog teams requested for 1 March 1912, Scott furthermore wrote, "No-one is to blame and I hope no attempt will be made to suggest that we have lacked support". Cherry-Garrard, whom Atkinson placed in charge of the dog teams which started late, failed to meet Scott and turned for home, observes that "the whole business simply bristles with 'ifs'"; an accumulation of decisions and circumstances that might have fallen differently ultimately led to catastrophe. But "we were as wise as anyone can be before the event."

After suffering irreversible damage while carrying supplies to base stations in Greenland, Terra Nova was set on fire and later sunk by gunfire off the southern coast of Greenland on 13 September 1943, at 60°15′15″N 45°55′45″W. Its submerged remains were found in 2012.

Héroes de la Antártida (Heroes of the Antarctica), a song from the album Descanso dominical (1988) by the spanish pop band Mecano and composed by José María Cano, is based on the story of the Terra Nova Expedition. The lyrics of the song's chorus ask: "Who remembers Captain Scott?".

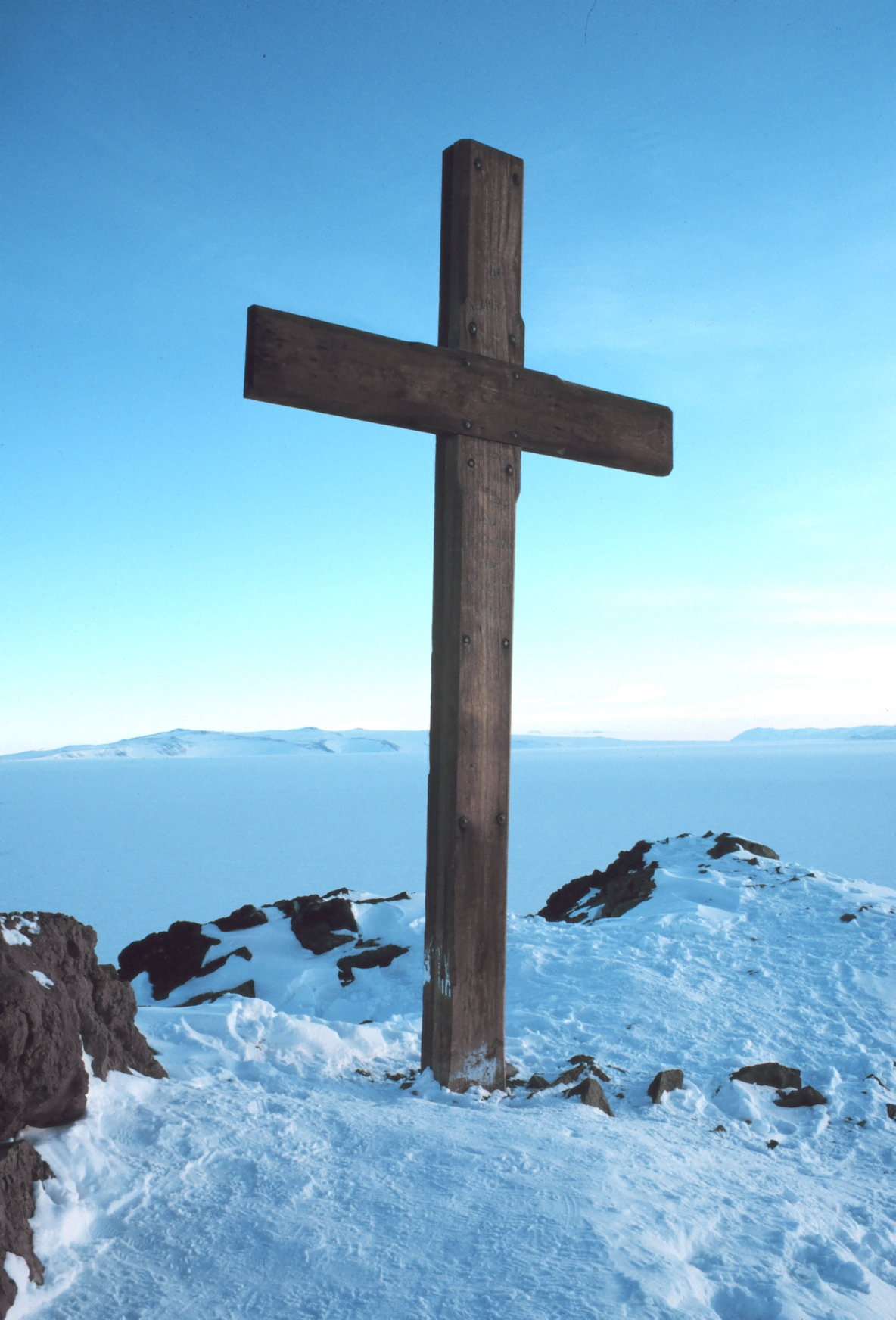
Observation Hill, overlooking Hut Point, where the Terra Nova memorial cross was erected in January 1913

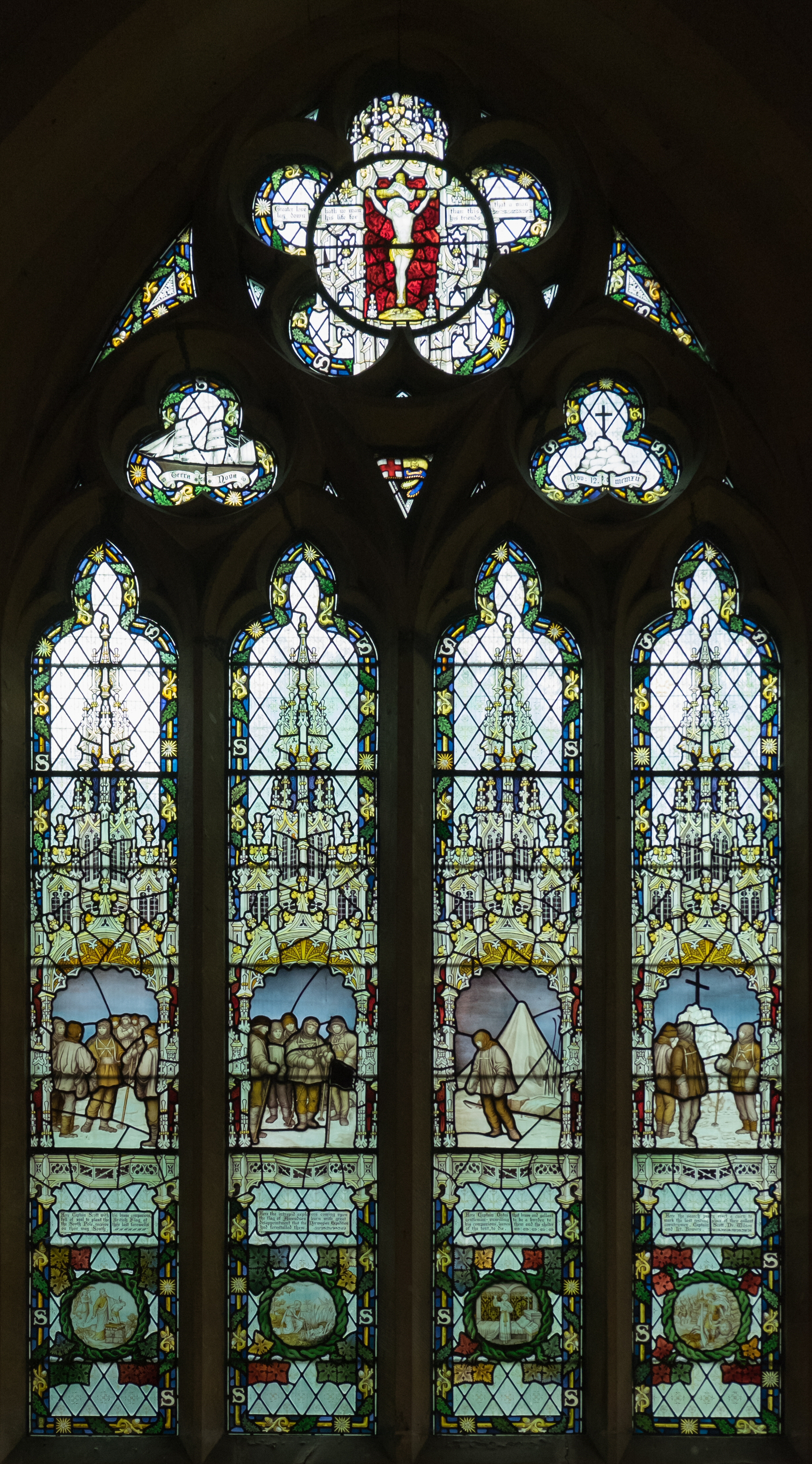
Dedicated in 1915, the Scott Window in St Peter's Church, Binton, is a memorial to the members of Scott's polar party.

== Scientific legacy ==
The scientific contributions of the expedition were long overshadowed by the deaths of Scott and his party. The 12 scientists who participated—the largest Antarctic scientific team of its time—made important discoveries in zoology, botany, geology, glaciology, and meteorology. The Terra Nova returned to England with over 2,100 plants, animals, and fossils, over 400 of which were new to science. Discoveries of the fossil plant Glossopteris—also found in Australia, New Zealand, Africa, and India—supported the ideas that the climate of Antarctica was formerly warm enough to support trees, and that Antarctica was once united to the other landmasses. Before the expedition, glaciers had been studied only in Europe. The meteorological data collected was the longest unbroken weather record in the early twentieth century, providing baselines for current assessments of climate change. In 1920, former Terra Nova geographer Frank Debenham and geologist Raymond Priestley founded the Scott Polar Research Institute at the University of Cambridge, which houses a major library of polar research.

== See also ==
- Comparison of the Amundsen and Scott Expeditions
- The Great White Silence, a 1924 documentary film about the expedition
- Heroic Age of Antarctic Exploration
- List of Antarctic expeditions
- The Worst Journey in the World, Apsley Cherry-Garrard's account of the expedition
