= George P. Abbott =

English naval officer and Antarctic explorer

George Percy Abbott RVM
- George Percy Abbott sitting on his bunk
- Born: 10 March 1880; Islington, London, England
- Died: 22 November 1923 (aged 43); Henlow Aerodrome, England
- Spouse: Emily Soutar (m. 1916)
- Military career
- Allegiance: United Kingdom
- Branch: Royal Navy; Royal Naval Air Service; Royal Air Force
- Years of service: 1895–1923
- Rank: Petty officer (RN); Pilot officer (RNAS, RAF)
- Expeditions: Terra Nova expedition; World War I
- Awards: Royal Victorian Medal (1901); Polar Medal with clasp (1913)

George Percy Abbott RVM (10 March 1880 – 22 November 1923) was a Royal Navy petty officer, Royal Naval Air Service pilot officer, and Antarctic explorer.

Abbott was a survivor of Robert Falcon Scott's Antarctic Terra Nova expedition, and was one of six arctic explorers that were part of its Northern Party.

== Biography ==
Abbott was born in London in 1880 and joined the Navy three days after this 15th birthday. At the age of 18 he was one of the young naval ratings to be selected to pull the gun-carriage bearing Queen Victoria's coffin during her funeral procession. The original intention had been to have the coffin pulled by horses but the sailors were selected after the horses broke their tracers. George was awarded the Royal Victorian Medal for his gallantry during the procession where he had recaptured and calmed a horse carrying a senior army officer that got excited and broke away from the parade.

In 1910 he was recruited to join Captain Robert Scott's Terra Nova Expedition to Antarctica, at the time he was Petty Officer but he signed on as an able seaman (AB) at £6/month. Called 'Tiny' by his friends he was one of the tallest men on the ship. He was a well-built man, champion wrestler, and a qualified physical instructor in 1st class.

As part of the Terra Nova Expedition, Abbot was one of six arctic explorers that were included in the Northern Expedition. This expedition ended up stranded for nine extra months and survived the winter in an ice cave before completing a very difficult trek across Antarctica to rejoin the rest of the Terra Nova Expedition. On the return to England Abbott had a breakdown and was invalided out of the service for a time.

== Legacy ==
Mount Abbott, a 1,020m-high mountain on the coast of Victoria Land, and Abbott Peak, a foothill of Mount Erebus on Ross Island, are named in honour of Petty Officer George P. Abbott.
