= List of University of Birmingham people =

This is a list of notable people related to the University of Birmingham.

== Chancellors ==
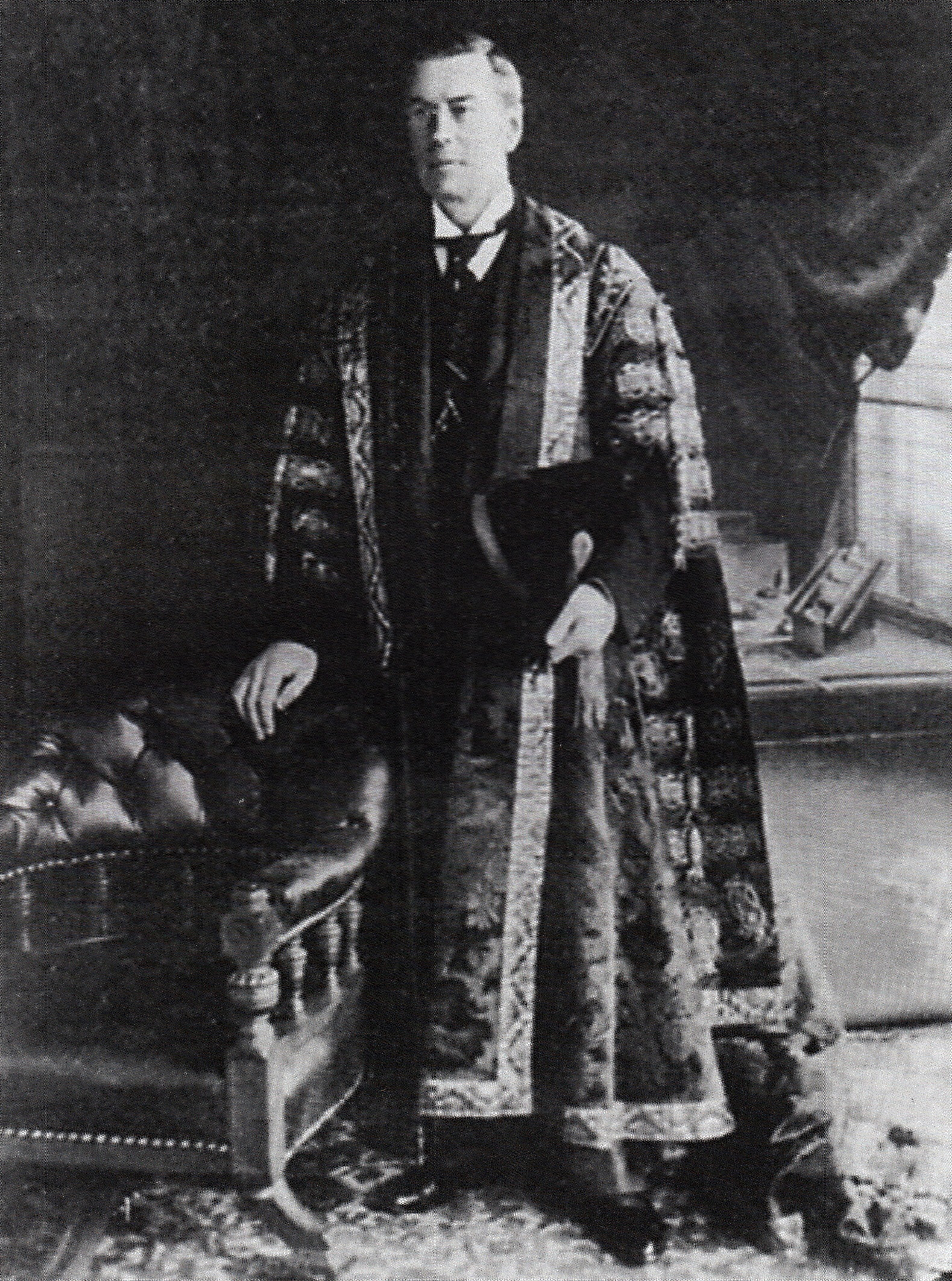
Joseph Chamberlain in the Chancellor's robes

The University of Birmingham has had seven chancellors since gaining its royal charter in 1900. Joseph Chamberlain, the first chancellor, was largely responsible for the university gaining its royal charter in 1900 and for the development of the Edgbaston campus.

Name	Duration
Joseph Chamberlain	1900–1914
Robert Cecil, 1st Viscount Cecil of Chelwood (Nobel Peace Prize, 1937)	1918–1944
Anthony Eden, Earl of Avon (Prime Minister of the United Kingdom)	1945–1973
Sir Peter Scott	1973–1983
Sir Alex Jarratt	1983–2002
Sir Dominic Cadbury	2002–2013
Lord Bilimoria	2014–2024
Sandie Okoro	2024–

== Vice-chancellors and principals ==
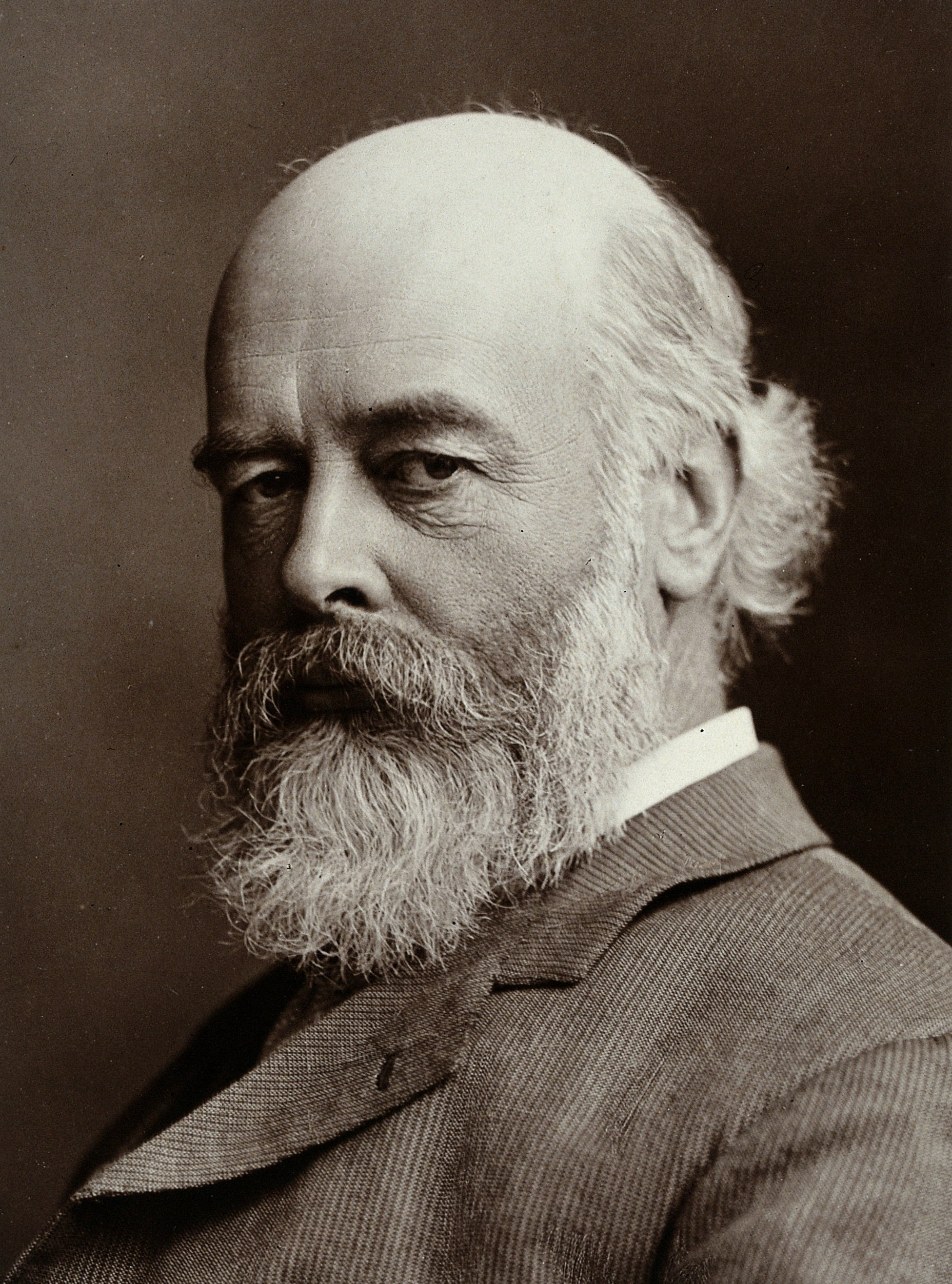
Sir Oliver Lodge

- Sir Oliver Lodge, physicist, Principal of the University of Birmingham 1900–19
- Sir Charles Grant Robertson, British academic historian, Fellow of All Souls College, Oxford, Principal of the University of Birmingham 1920–1923, Vice-chancellor & Principal of the University of Birmingham 1923–1938
- Sir Raymond Priestley, geologist and early Antarctic explorer, Vice-chancellor & Principal of the University of Birmingham 1938–1952
- Humphrey Francis Humphreys, academic, Vice-chancellor & Principal of the University of Birmingham 1952–1953
- Sir Robert Aitken, Vice-chancellor & Principal of the University of Birmingham 1953–1968, helped set up the University of Warwick
- Lord Hunter of Newington, physician, Vice-chancellor & Principal of the University of Birmingham 1968–1981
- Edward Marsland, Vice-chancellor & Principal of the University of Birmingham 1982–1987
- Sir Michael Thompson, Vice-chancellor & Principal of the University of Birmingham 1987–1996
- Maxwell Irvine, theoretical physicist, Vice-chancellor & Principal of the University of Birmingham 1996–2001
- Sir Michael Sterling, Vice-chancellor & Principal of the University of Birmingham 2001–2009
- Sir David Eastwood, former Chief Executive at the Higher Education Funding Council for England (HEFCE), Vice-chancellor & Principal of the University of Birmingham 2009–2021
- Adam Tickell, Vice-chancellor & Principal of the University of Birmingham 2022–

== Birmingham University OTC ==
- William Slim, 1st Viscount Slim, Field Marshal, member of Birmingham University Officers' Training Corps 1912–14

== Birmingham University Air Squadron ==
- Sir John Aiken, Air Chief Marshal, became Officer Commanding Birmingham University Air Squadron in 1950

== Others ==
- Sir Julian Bullard, British diplomat, Foreign Office Minister and Pro-Chancellor of Birmingham University
- Margery Fry, prison reformer and Principal of Somerville College, Oxford, first warden of University House, the first all-women university Hall of Residence in Britain
- David Hannay, Baron Hannay of Chiswick, British diplomat, Pro-Chancellor of Birmingham University 2001–06.
- James Marshall, member of the university clerical staff in the Faculty of Medicine, awarded the Victoria Cross for his part in the attack on the Sambre–Oise Canal in World War One on 4 November 1918
- Jonathan Nicholls, Registrar of Birmingham University
