= Robert Forde =

Irish Antarctic explorer (1875–1959)

- Born: 29 August 1875; Moviddy, County Cork, Ireland
- Died: 13 March 1959 (aged 83); Cobh, Ireland
- Occupations: British Royal Navy NCO, polar explorer
- Known for: Terra Nova Expedition

Robert Forde (29 August 1875 – 13 March 1959) was an Irish Antarctic explorer and member of the Terra Nova Expedition under Captain Robert Falcon Scott from 1910–1912.

== Early life ==
Robert Forde was born in rural parish of Moviddy near Bandon 16 miles from Cork City, Ireland. His father's name was George and his mother's was Charity (née Payne). George and Charity Forde married in 1859 in Bandon. His mother was born in 1836. Forde was the youngest of three children. Sarah Forde was born in 1867 and his brother John Forde was born in 1874. In 1901 Charity, now a widow, and her children lived in Teadies, County Cork. By 1911 she had relocated with Sarah her eldest child to Brinny, County Cork. Forde was a Protestant and he lived near Kilmurry. He was related to the legendary car maker 'Henry Forde', who lived near his family. At the age of sixteen, he had joined the Royal Navy which was 1891, rising to the rank of Petty Officer 1st Class. On 16 April 1910 at 35 years old and as a Petty Officer, he volunteered to take part in Robert Falcon Scott's second expedition, the British Antarctic Expedition (Terra Nova Expedition) 1910–1913. Forde was one of a number of Irishmen who took part, including Tom Crean and another Corkman, Patrick Keohane. Forde was part of a group which headed out from Cape Evans in January 1911 to explore the polar capes.

== Career ==
Forde took part in two depot laying journeys. During the Western Party journey, he was sledge master which was led by Griffith Taylor in 1911. The Terra Nova expedition undertook an extensive survey of the Antarctic from 1911–1913. Forde and his companions had the responsibility of examining the area around Ross Island and the Polar Plateau. This is the reason behind the glacier being called Mount Forde in the Victoria Land. Temperatures dropped as low as −62 °C (−80 °F), leaving Forde to return home due to his hand being severely frostbitten. By March 1912, Forde was suffering so badly that he was ordered to the Terra Nova by Captain Scott. His hands were saved and he was brought back to New Zealand in April 1912. As a result, he did not participate on the final and fatal attempt on the South Pole. Scott's logs of the expedition stated that he missed Forde when he was gone - "no one who could replace him,". When he returned home, he was able to serve in the Royal Navy at the height of the First World War. He served on number of ships and received a promotion to Chief Petty Officer. He was assigned to his former ship HMS Vivid in October 1913. He survived the war and remained in the Royal Navy until 17 February 1920 when he returned to Cobh, County Cork, where he spent the rest of his life. Until his death he wore a glove to protect his hand from the effects of the severe frostbite he had suffered half a century before.

=== Terra Nova Expedition ===
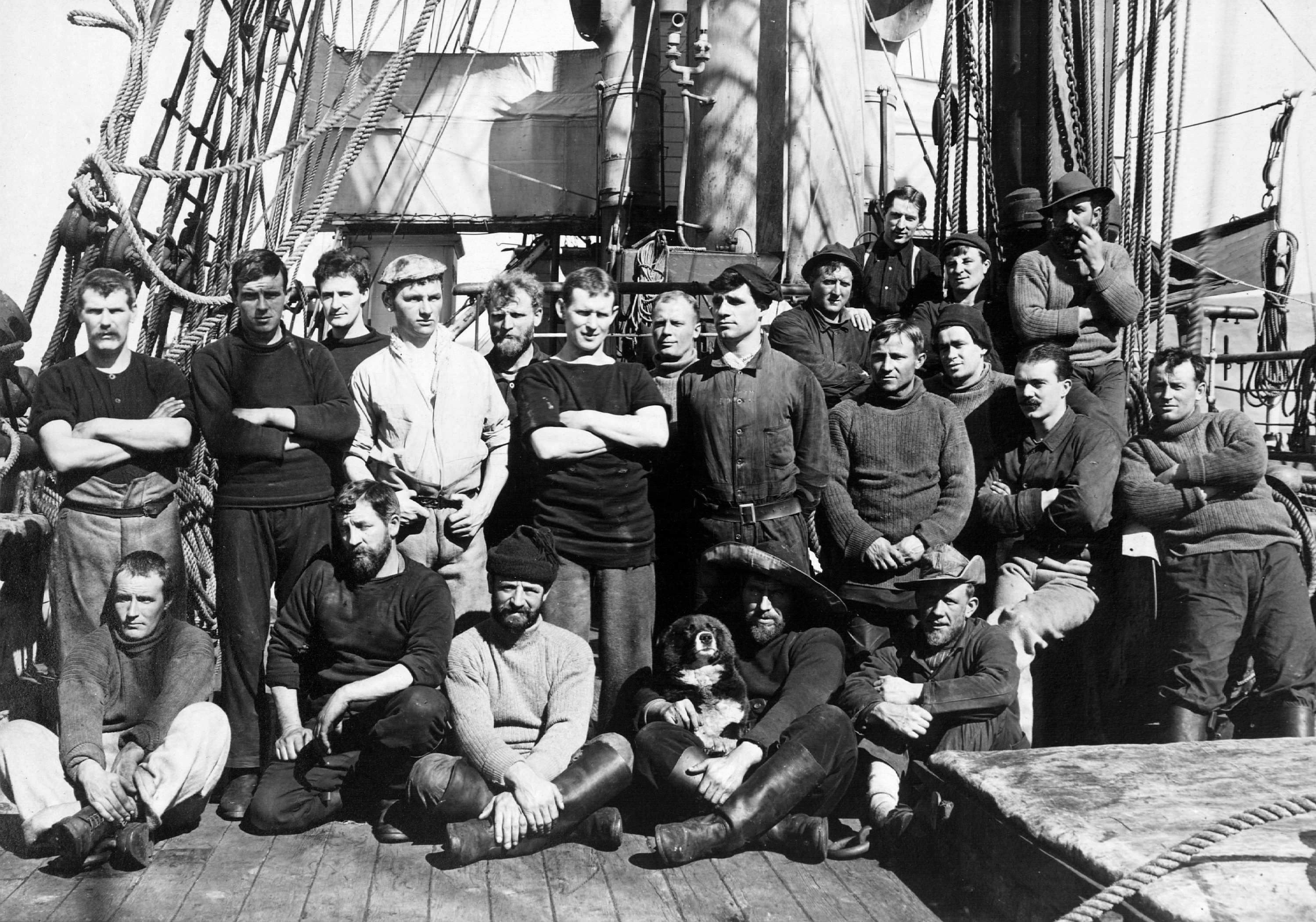
Herbert G. Ponting photographed the crew of the Terra Nova in Antarctica in November 1910. Petty officer Robert Forde, Royal Navy, is seated in the front row, holding a dog.

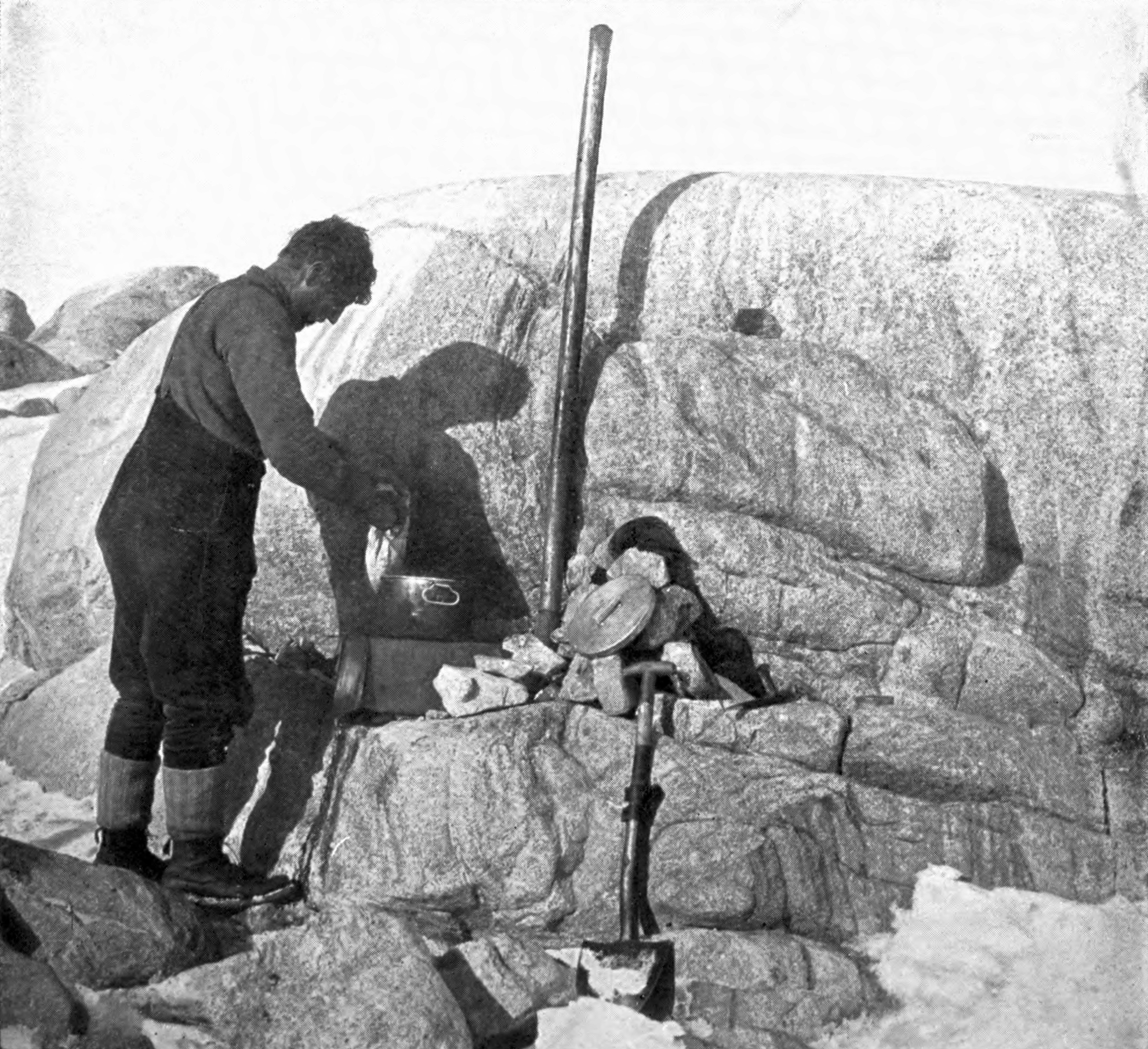
Forde cooking seal fry for the second western party at Cape Roberts (December 1911)

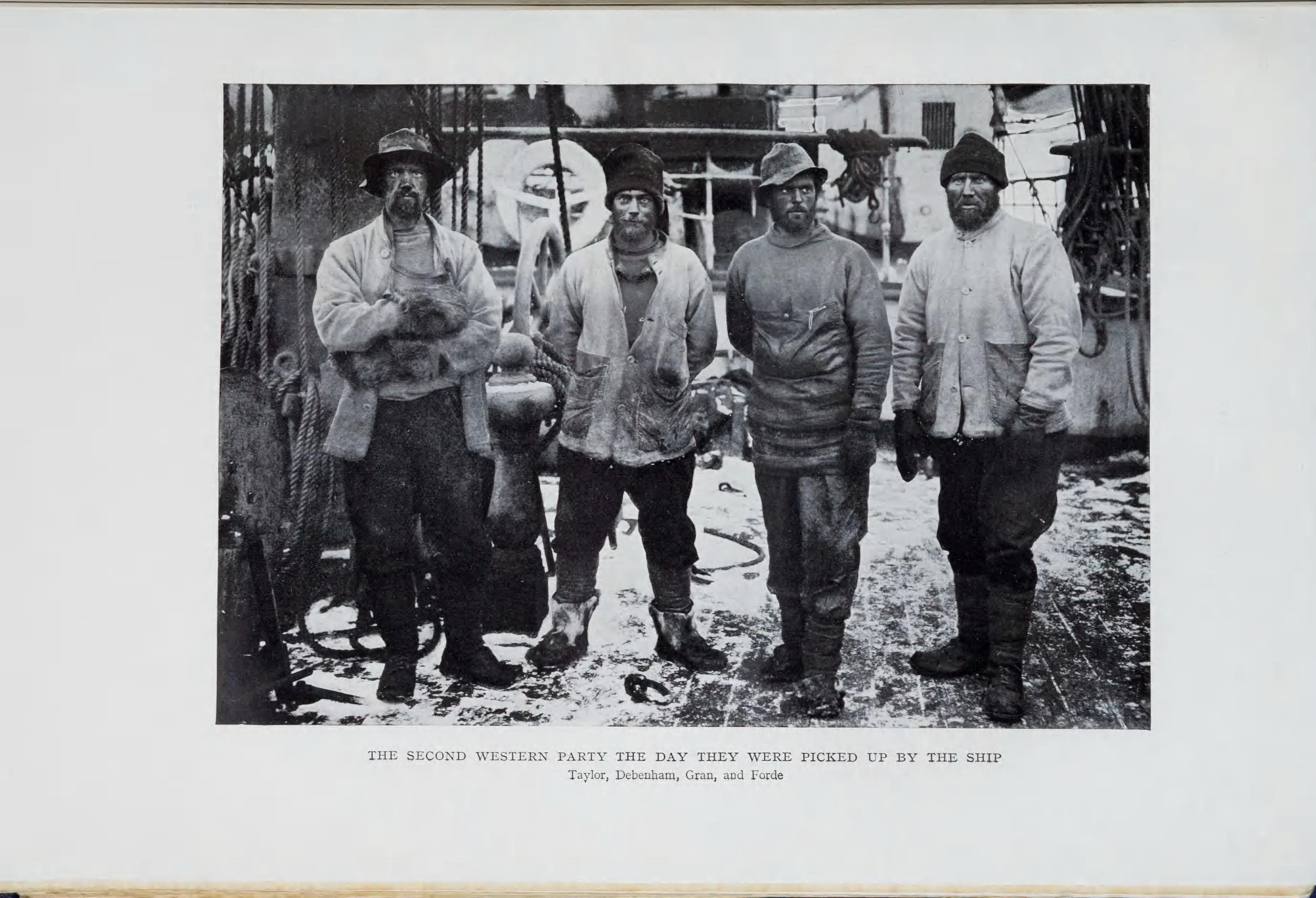
The second western party (Thomas Griffith Taylor, Frank Debenham, Tryggve Gran and Robert Forde) aboard the Terra Nova at the end of their journey (February 1912)

On 15 June 1910, The Terra Nova left Cardiff. Some 8000 people volunteered to take part in this expedition. It was traveling via the uninhabited Ilha de Trinidade and Cape Town to New Zealand. On 19 November 1910, they collected supplies and members of the expedition and left Port Chalmers. It reached Ross Island on 4 January 1911 after coming in contact with severe storms and heavy pack ice. A shore party of 34 spent two seasons exploring on and around the Ross Island Shelf. They were unable to reach the old Discovery Expedition hut at Hut Point. Scott had to settle for base on Cape Evans and started to unload the same day. One of the expedition's three experimental motor sledges was lost in the process, plunging through the sea ice.

The Terra Nova left on 26 January carrying a four-man team headed for the Victoria Land mountains opposite Ross island, and six-man Eastern Party under Lt. Victor Campbell. The Victoria Land Party included the geologists Thomas Griffith Taylor and Frank Debenham, the physicist C. S. Wright, and petty officer Edgar Evans. It investigated the geology and glaciology of the McMurdo dry valleys and Taylor Glacier and Koettlitz Glacier, returning to Hut Point on 14 March.

The Terra Nova left Cape Evans with the remains of the expedition on 19 January 1913; pausing to pick up Taylor's and Debenhams's and the Eastern Party's specimens from Victoria Land, they sailed for New Zealand. They arrived to telegraph the news of Scott's death on 10 February 1913.

=== Robert Forde's relationship with Captain Scott ===
Captain Scott, whose full name was Robert Falcon Scott was the Captain of the Terra Nova. On this expedition, Captain Scott was nicknamed 'The Skipper'. While on this expedition with Forde, Robert Scott wrote numerous diaries on the South Pole. This was then published in 1913 as Scotts Expedition. In January 1912, Captain Scott and the remaining men on his team reached the South Pole. They had been gone for 93 days and covered 960 statute miles. Scott died on his way back from the expedition from starvation and exposure. He and the rest of the team had been dead eight months before they were found.

== Death ==
Memorial to Robert Forde in Cobh, Ireland

Forde's role in the expedition led to his promotion to Chief Petty Officer on board HMS Vivid, and he served on her and several other British ships during World War 1. After demobilisation he retired to Cobh, which was still then known as Queenstown and was a major naval port for the British in Ireland. Forde attended the film premiere of Scott of the Antarctic in Cork in June 1949, along with Ellen Crean, the widow of his former Terra Nova colleague, Tom Crean. He died in Cobh in March 1959.

He is remembered by the naming of Mount Forde, a monumental peak of over 1,200 metres at the head of Hunt Glacier in Victoria Land Antarctica (76°53'S, 162°05'E).

Robert Forde is buried at the Clonmel Old Church Cemetery, Cobh in his native County Cork. In March 2009, on the 50th Anniversary of his death, a memorial was unveiled to Forde by the Robert Forde Memorial Committee in the Promenade, Cobh. The rough hewn granite stone faces out towards Cork Harbour and has a bronze plaque showing Forde with his sled. A plaque was also unveiled at 52 Harbour Row, Cobh where he lived.
