= Susan Rice (banker) =

British banker (born 1946)

Dame Susan Ilene Rice DBE FRSE
- Born: Susan Ilene Wunsch; 7 March 1946 (age 80); United States
- Education: Wellesley College; University of Aberdeen
- Occupation: Banker
- Spouse: Sir Duncan Rice

Dame Susan Ilene Rice, Lady Rice, DBE FRSE (née Wunsch) is a British banker, company and charity director and Chair of Scottish Water, Business Stream, North American Income Trust, and non-executive director of the Office for Budget Responsibility. In 2000 she became the first woman to lead a British clearing bank.

== Early life ==
Born Susan Ilene Wunsch on 7 March 1946, she grew up in Rhode Island, in the United States. She studied biology and philosophy of science at Wellesley College, Massachusetts, United States, graduating in 1967 with a Bachelor of Arts.

At Wellesley she met Scottish historian Sir Duncan Rice; they married shortly after her graduation and moved to Scotland. She then studied philosophy of science at University of Aberdeen, gaining a Master of Letters in 1970. Rice and her husband returned to the United States. Initially a published medical researcher in molecular biology, she became an associate dean at Yale.

She was then Dean of Saybrook College, Yale University (1978–80). In 1981, she moved to upstate New York and worked as Dean of Students at Colgate University.

== Banking ==
In 1986, she began working for NatWest Bancorp, where she managed a ground-breaking community reinvestement and economic development programme alongside M & A work. In 1996, her husband was appointed Vice-Chancellor at the University of Aberdeen, they moved back to Scotland. She joined the Bank of Scotland in 1997.

In September 2000 she was appointed chief executive of Lloyds TSB Scotland and so became the first woman to lead a British clearing bank. In May 2008 she took on the additional role of chairman. When Lloyds Banking Group was created after the takeover of HBOS that year, Rice was appointed as managing director of the Scottish part of the Group. Rice retired from this position in December 2014.

She became a non-executive director at Scottish and Southern Energy plc (SSE) in 2003, then took the position of senior independent director in 2007. In 2011, she became a member of Scotland's Council of Economic Advisers. In 2012, she became the first woman to be appointed president of the Scottish Council for Development and Industry. In 2013, she became a non-executive director of supermarket chain Sainsbury's and senior independent director in 2016. In March 2015 it was announced that she had been appointed the chair of Scottish Water, taking up the post on 1 June 2015.

She was a member of Court of the Bank of England, first appointed in 2007, reappointed in 2009, serving until June 2014.

She chaired the Chartered Banker Professional Standards Board (CB:PSB), a voluntary initiative supported by nine leading banks in the UK, which was established in October 2011. In April 2015, she was also appointed as a non-practitioner member of the Banking Standards Board, later the Financial Services Culture Board, and appointed Chair in 2020.

== Cultural roles ==
Active in economic development and financial inclusion alongside her work in banking, she was a director of several third-party financial intermediaries in the US. In the UK, she was a founding director of Charity Bank(2001-2008) and Big Society Capital (2011–2018) and helped to establish Bridges Venture Capital and Social Investment Scotland . She was chair of the Edinburgh International Book Festival from 2001 to October 2015.

In 2008, the Edinburgh Festivals Forum was formed as a commission with strategic development role, appointing Rice as chair. From 2011-2022, she was chair of governors of the Patrons of the National Galleries of Scotland . In June 2015, she was invited to chair Scotland's 2020 Climate Group, having been vice-chair of the group since it was formed in 2009, and she is a member of the Place Based Climate Action Network alongside the chair of the global steering group of the Global Ethical Finance Initiative.

== Honours ==
In 2002 she was elected a Fellow of the Royal Society of Edinburgh (FRSE), and a Fellow of the Royal Society of Arts (FRSA) in 2004.

In 2021, she was invited to become a Freeman of the City

Rice was appointed a Commander of the Order of the British Empire (CBE) for services to banking in the 2005 New Year Honours and elevated to Dame Commander of the Order of the British Empire for services to the Business, the Arts and charity in the 2018 New Year Honours.

In 2005 she became Prince Charles's Ambassador for Corporate Social Responsibility in Scotland. She received the inaugural Leadership Award at the National Business Awards Scotland 2007.

In 2011, she received Wellesley's highest award, Alumnae Achievement Award, in 2011 the Arts and Business Scotland's Leadership Award, in 2017 the Institute of Directors Scotland's Chair's Awards

She has eight honorary degrees, including Edinburgh University, Glasgow University and Aberdeen University and Heriot-Watt and was a Regent of the Royal College of Surgeons of Edinburgh
