= Dominic Cadbury =

British businessman (born 1940)

Sir Dominic Cadbury
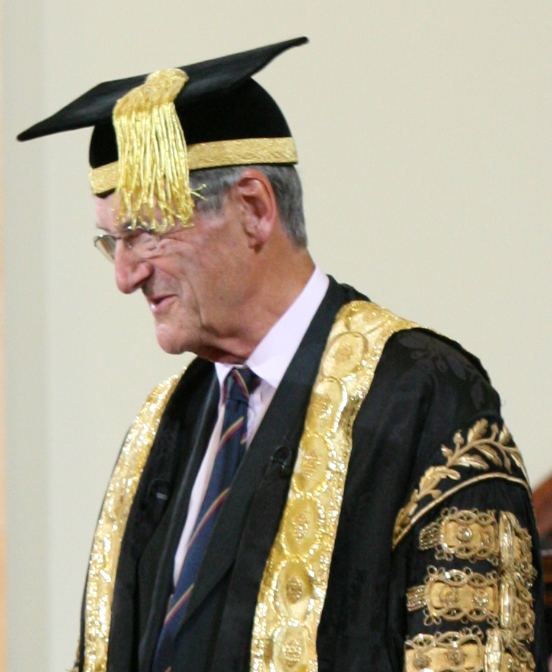
- Attending a convocation ceremony at the University of Birmingham on 5 July 2012

Chancellor of the University of Birmingham
- In office 2002–2014
- Preceded by: Alex Jarratt
- Succeeded by: The Lord Bilimoria

Personal details
- Born: Nicholas Dominic Cadbury; 12 May 1940 (age 86)
- Spouse: Cecilia Sarah Symes (m. 1972)
- Relatives: George Cadbury (grandfather); Sir Adrian Cadbury (brother)
- Education: Stanford University

Sir Nicholas Dominic Cadbury (born 12 May 1940) is a British businessman and member of the Cadbury chocolate manufacturing dynasty. He was the sixth chancellor of University of Birmingham, stepping down in 2014.

== Early life ==
Cadbury was born on 12 May 1940, the son of Laurence John Cadbury and Joyce Cadbury, and the grandson of George Cadbury. He was educated at Eton College. After graduating from Trinity College, Cambridge, he completed his Master of Business Administration (MBA) at Stanford University.

== Career ==
Cadbury joined Cadbury Schweppes in 1964. He was appointed to the board in 1975, serving as group chief executive from 1983 to 1993, then as chairman until his planned retirement on his 60th birthday on 12 May 2000.

His non-executive positions include chairman of the Economist Group and joint deputy chairman of EMI. He is also a member of the Council of Management of the National Institute of Economic and Social Research. Since November 2005 he is the chairman of Misys plc.

Cadbury was appointed chancellor of the University of Birmingham on 2 May 2002 upon the retirement of Sir Alex Jarratt. In 2013 he was succeeded by Lord Bilimoria.

== Family ==
He married Cecilia Sarah Symes in 1972 and they had three daughters. His brother, Sir Adrian Cadbury, was also a former Cadbury company executive.

== Honours ==
Cadbury was knighted in the 1997 Birthday Honours.

Academic offices
Preceded by Alex Jarratt	Chancellor of the University of Birmingham; 2002–2014	Succeeded by The Lord Bilimoria
