= Maurice Shock =

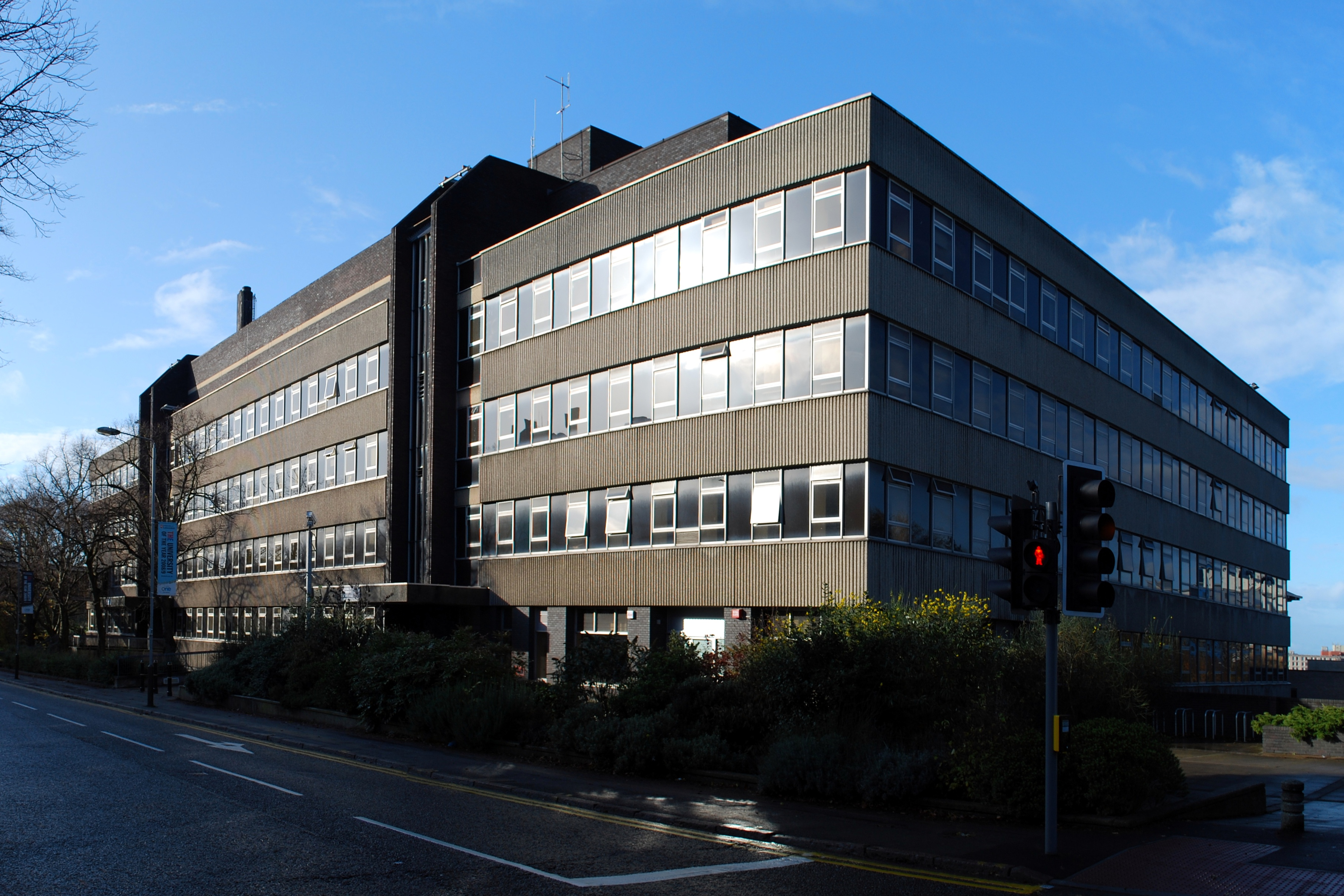
The Maurice Shock Building at the University of Leicester, named after Shock

Sir Maurice Shock (15 April 1926 – 7 July 2018) was a British university administrator and educationalist.

Shock was educated at King Edward's School, Birmingham and later read philosophy, politics and economics (PPE) at Balliol College, Oxford, where he obtained a first-class degree.

During his early career, Shock worked for British intelligence. After graduating he had a period of research at St Antony's College, Oxford and temporary posts at Christ Church, Oxford and at Trinity College, Oxford. He was one of the team of assistants to Sir Winston Churchill in the writing of his histories. He was the Politics Fellow (1956–77) and Estates Bursar (1958–73) of University College, Oxford, and was later made an Honorary Fellow of the college in 1985.

His academic publications include The Liberal Tradition: From Fox to Keynes (co-edited with Alan Bullock, 1967) and related works.

Shock served as vice-chancellor of the University of Leicester from 1977 to 1987, and was chairman of the Committee of Vice-Chancellors and Principals for two years. He then became Rector of Lincoln College, Oxford until retiring in 1994. He was a member of the UK General Medical Council from 1989 to 1999. The Maurice Shock Building at the University of Leicester is named after him.

He died on 7 July 2018, aged 92.

Academic offices
Preceded by Sir Fraser Noble	Vice-chancellor of the University of Leicester; 1977–1987	Succeeded by Dr Kenneth Edwards
Preceded by Vivian H. H. Green	Rector of Lincoln College, Oxford; 1987–1994	Succeeded by Sir Eric Anderson
