= Vivian H. H. Green =

English academic and writer

Vivian Hubert Howard Green (18 November 1915 – 18 January 2005) was a Fellow and Rector of Lincoln College, Oxford, a priest, author, teacher, and historian. He was also celebrated for his influence on his pupil at Sherborne School and later at Lincoln College, by John le Carré, who in 1995 acknowledged him as one of the interior models for his spymaster character George Smiley.

== Early life and education ==
Green was born at 101, Thurlby Road, Wembley, Middlesex, England, to Hubert James Green, a law stationer's clerk (son of a master tailor), and Edith Eleanor Playle, née Howard, daughter of a civil servant. The Greens ran a grocery and confectionery shop at Shanklin on the Isle of Wight, where Edith Green's family lived, from the late 1920s, formerly having had a confectionery shop at Wembley. After a few years the family settled at Minehead in Somerset; Green's mother took additional work at a home for the elderly to help send her son to Bradfield College, Berkshire. Green was not close to his father, whose "personal conduct put strain on [his parents'] marriage". He then won a Goldsmith's scholarship to Trinity Hall, Cambridge (1933), where he achieved a first in the Tripos. At Trinity Hall, he specialised in ecclesiastical history and became the Lightfoot Scholar. Postgraduate work was done on a Gladstone Scholarship to St Deiniol's Library, Hawarden followed by a period of lecturing on ecclesiastical history at St Augustine's College, Canterbury. When asked if he had considered sitting the exams for ordination, he noted that this would pose problems as he was responsible for marking them, but he was ordained in 1939 by the Archbishop of Canterbury, Cosmo Gordon Lang.

== Ecclesiastical and academic career ==
- 1939–48 Fellow, St Augustine's College, Canterbury
- 1939 Ordained Deacon
- 1940 Ordained Priest
- 1940–42 Chaplain, Exeter School and St Luke's College, Exeter
- 1942–51 Chaplain and Assistant Master, Sherborne School
- 1951–69 Chaplain, Lincoln College, Oxford
- 1951–83 Fellow and Tutor in History
- 1970–83 Sub-Rector
- 1972–73 Acting Rector
- 1983–87 Rector
- 1987–2005 Honorary Fellow

Green was the only Fellow of Lincoln to vote against the college accepting women, but remained in office after the vote in 1979, becoming Rector in 1983. He left his "delightful if somewhat decaying" Grade II* listed fifteenth-century house, Calendars, at Burford, for the Old Prebendal House nursing home at Shipton-under-Wychwood, near Burford, where he died. He is buried in the graveyard of St Oswald's Church, Widford, Oxfordshire.

== Published books ==
- Bishop Reginald Pecock: A Study in Ecclesiastical History and Thought (1945)
- The Hanoverians, 1714–1815 (1948)
- From St Augustine to William Temple (1948)
- Renaissance and Reformation (1952; second edition 1962)
- The Later Plantagenets: A survey of English history between 1307 and 1485 (1955)
- Oxford Common Room (1957)
- The Young Mr Wesley: A Study of John Wesley and Oxford (1961)
- The Swiss Alps (1961)
- John Wesley (1964)
- Luther and the Reformation, Batsford (1964), London: Methuen, (1969)
- Religion at Oxford and Cambridge (1964)
- Green, Vivian Hubert Howard (1969). The universities. Pelican books. Harmondsworth: Penguin Books. ISBN 978-0-14-020962-4.
- Green, Vivian Hubert Howard (1971). Medieval civilization in Western Europe. London: Arnold. ISBN 978-0-7131-5573-0.
- Green, Vivian Hubert Howard (1978). Lincoln College: Oxford. Oxford: Thomas-Photos. ISBN 978-0-9501337-3-7.
- Green, Vivian Hubert Howard (1979). The Commonwealth of Lincoln College, 1427-1977. Oxford: Oxford Univ. Press. ISBN 978-0-19-920106-8.
- Green, Vivian Hubert Howard (1985). Love in a cool climate: the letters of Mark Pattison and Meta Bradley, 1879–1884. Oxford: Clarendon Press. ISBN 978-0-19-820080-2.
- Pattison, Mark (1988). Green, Vivian Hubert Howard (ed.). Memoirs of an Oxford don. Cassell biographies. London: Cassell. ISBN 978-0-304-32219-0.
- A Question of Guilt: The Murder of Nancy Eaton (1988) — co-written with William Scoular
- Green, Vivian Hubert Howard (1993). The madness of kings: personal trauma and the fate of nations. Stroud: Alan Sutton St. Martin's Press. ISBN 978-0-7509-0342-4.
- Green, Vivian Hubert Howard; Runcie, Robert (1996). A new history of Christianity. Stroud: Sutton. ISBN 978-0-7509-1271-6.
- Green, Vivian Hubert Howard (1998). The European reformation. Sutton pocket histories. Stroud, Gloucestershire: Sutton. ISBN 978-0-7509-1915-9.

=== Published articles ===
- Green, V. H. H. (1 March 1983). "The Lisles in their letters". History Today. 32 (3).
- Green, V. H. H. (1 February 1997). "Review of A history of religion in Britain". The English Historical Review. 112 (445): 152–153. doi:10.1093/ehr/CXII.445.152. ISSN 0013-8266.

Academic offices
Preceded by Burke Trend	Rector of Lincoln College, Oxford; 1983–1987	Succeeded by Sir Maurice Shock
