= Fraser Noble =

Sir Fraser Noble MBE

Principal of the University of Aberdeen
- In office 1976–1981
- Preceded by: Sir Edward Maitland Wright
- Succeeded by: George Paul McNicol

Vice-Chancellor of the University of Leicester
- In office 1962–1976
- Preceded by: Sir Charles Wilson
- Succeeded by: Sir Maurice Shock

Personal details
- Born: 29 April 1918 Cromdale, Strathspey, Scotland
- Died: 21 August 2003 (aged 85) Nairn, County of Nairn, Scotland
- Spouse: Barbara Sinclair (m. 1945)
- Children: 2
- Education: Nairn Academy
- Alma mater: University of Aberdeen
- Profession: Academic, and university administrator

Sir Thomas Alexander Fraser Noble MBE (29 April 1918 – 21 August 2003) was a Scottish academic. He was former Vice-Chancellor of the University of Leicester and then Principal of the University of Aberdeen.

== Early life ==
He was born in Cromdale in Strathspey, Scotland. His father was Simon Noble of Grantown-on-Spey in the former Moray, and his mother was Jeanie Graham from Largs in North Ayrshire. His father died when he was eight. He had a brother. He attended Nairn Academy. He went to the University of Aberdeen when aged only 16. He graduated with a degree in Classics in 1938. He did military service with the Black Watch (Royal Highland Regiment).

== Career ==
=== University of Leicester ===
In 1962 he became Vice-Chancellor of the University of Leicester at the age of 43. The University of Leicester now has the Fraser Noble Building. In 1962 the university had 1,500 students and two faculties of Arts and Sciences. By the time he left, the university had five faculties and 6,000 students. Thanks to him, the Royal Commission on Medical Education (1965–68) in its 1968 report decided that the university needed a medical school. From 1970-72 he was Chairman of the Committee of Vice-Chancellors and Principals of the Universities of the United Kingdom (now known as Universities UK).

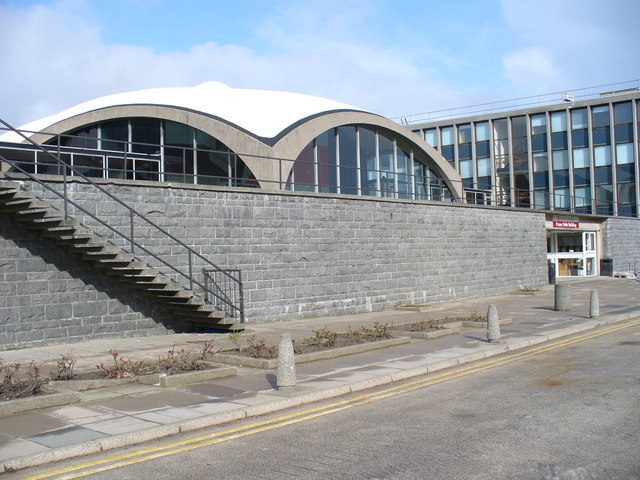
Fraser Noble building at the University of Aberdeen

=== University of Aberdeen ===
From 1948 to 1957 he lectured in Political Economy (Economics) at the University of Aberdeen. He drew up the constitution for the Scottish Economic Society. He became the Principal of the University of Aberdeen in 1976. The university, like Leicester, has a Fraser Noble Building.

== Personal life ==
He was knighted in the 1971 Birthday Honours. He married in 1945 and they had a son and a daughter. His wife taught Maths at Nairn Academy. He enjoyed playing golf. He lived in Nairn for the last 22 years of his life.

Academic offices
Preceded by Sir Edward Maitland Wright	Principal and Vice-Chancellor of the University of Aberdeen; 1976 - 1981	Succeeded by George Paul McNicol
Preceded by Charles Wilson	Vice-Chancellor of the University of Leicester; 1962 - 1976	Succeeded by Maurice Shock
Preceded by	Chairman of the Committee of Vice-Chancellors and Principals; 1970 - 1972	Succeeded by
