= James Alastair Taylor =

Scottish judge

The Honourable Sheriff Taylor

Sheriff Principal of Glasgow and Strathkelvin
- In office 2005–2011
- Preceded by: Edward F Bowen

Personal details
- Born: James Alastair Taylor; 21 February 1951
- Died: 9 March 2021 (aged 70)
- Spouse: Lesley Macleod
- Education: University of Aberdeen
- Profession: Advocate

James Alastair Taylor (21 February 1951 - 9 March 2021) was sheriff principal of the Sheriffdom of Glasgow and Strathkelvin.

== Early life ==
Taylor was born in Inverness and educated at Nairn Academy and the University of Aberdeen (B.Sc., LL.B.). He was apprenticed to Brander & Cruickshank, Advocates in Aberdeen, in 1975, and admitted as a solicitor in 1977.

== Legal career ==
Taylor worked as an assistant solicitor at Lefevre & Co., Advocates in Aberdeen, from 1977 to 1978. He then moved to be an assistant at A. C. Morrison & Richards, Aberdeen, being promoted to partner in 1980. In 1988, he moved again, to be a partner at McGrigor Donald in Glasgow, being promoted to head of litigation in 1992. He qualified as a solicitor-advocate in 1993.

In 1998, he was appointed a sheriff of Lothian and Borders, at Edinburgh, moving in 1999 to be commercial sheriff of Glasgow and Strathkelvin. He was promoted to Sheriff Principal of Glasgow and Strathkelvin in 2005, serving in that position until 2011.

== Personal life ==
Taylor married Lesley Macleod in 1980, with whom he had two sons. He was a keen golfer, and a member of Nairn, the Royal Aberdeen and Glasgow Golf Clubs.

== See also ==
- Glasgow Sheriff Court
