= George Paul McNicol =

Scottish physician and academic

George Paul McNicol CBE

Principal of the University of Aberdeen
- In office 1981–1991
- Preceded by: Sir Fraser Noble
- Succeeded by: Maxwell Irvine

Personal details
- Born: 24 September 1929 Glasgow, Scotland
- Died: 28 July 2014 (aged 96)
- Spouse: Susan Moira Ritchie (m. 1959)
- Children: 3
- Education: Hillhead High School
- Alma mater: University of Glasgow
- Profession: Physician, academic, and university administrator

George Paul McNicol CBE (24 September 1929 – 28 July 2014) was a Scottish physician, academic and university academic. He was the Principal and Vice-Chancellor of the University of Aberdeen from 1981 to 1991.

== Early life ==
He was born in Glasgow, Scotland and studied at the local Hillhead High School and medicine at the University of Glasgow.

== Career ==
McNicol worked as a surgeon and physician before returning to academia via a Harkness Fellowship at the Washington University in St. Louis. He then gained a PhD from the University of Glasgow in 1965. His early academic career was at the University of Glasgow and he spent a secondment at Mekerere University College Medical School, Kenyatta National Hospital, Nairobi. He returned to the UK and was appointed Professor and Head of the Department of Medicine at the University of Leeds. He left Leeds to take up his next appointment as the Principal of the University of Aberdeen in 1981. He was awarded a CBE in the 1992 New Year Honours.

== Personal life ==
In 1959, he married Susan Moira Ritchie. They had three children and four grandchildren.

Academic offices
Preceded by Sir Fraser Noble	Principal and Vice-Chancellor of the University of Aberdeen; 1981—1991	Succeeded by Maxwell Irvine
