= Karan Bilimoria, Baron Bilimoria =

Indian-British entrepreneur and life peer (born 1961)

The Right Honourable The Lord Bilimoria CBE DL FCA
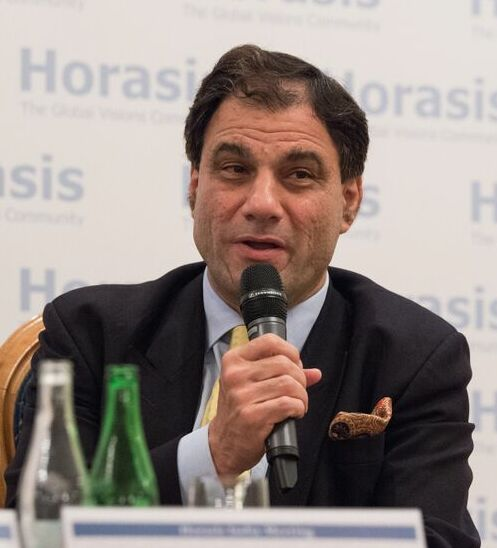
- Bilimoria in 2015

Chancellor of the University of Birmingham
- In office 18 July 2014 – 1 August 2024
- Preceded by: Sir Dominic Cadbury
- Succeeded by: Sandie Okoro

Member of the House of Lords
- Lord Temporal
- Life peerage 16 June 2006

Chancellor of Thames Valley University
- In office 2005–2010
- Preceded by: The Lord Paul of Marylebone
- Succeeded by: Laurence S. Geller

Personal details
- Born: Karan Faridoon Bilimoria; 26 November 1961 (age 64) Hyderabad, Andhra Pradesh, India
- Party: None (crossbencher)
- Spouse: Lynne Heather Bilimoria
- Children: 4
- Parent(s): Lt. General Faridoon N. Bilimoria and Yasmin Bilimoria
- Education: Osmania University; Sidney Sussex College, Cambridge
- Known for: Founder of Cobra Beer; President of Confederation of British Industry (2020–2022); Vice President of Confederation of British Industry (2022–2024)

Karan Faridoon Bilimoria, Baron Bilimoria, CBE, DL, FCA (born 26 November 1961) is a British Indian businessman, member of the House of Lords, and former Chancellor of the University of Birmingham.

Bilimoria founded the global beer brand Cobra Beer, and served as the company's chairman until November 2024. In addition to his business activities, Bilimoria is a politically active independent crossbench member of the House of Lords, served as Chancellor of the University of Birmingham from 2014 to 2024, and is the former President of the Confederation of British Industry (2020–2022) and Vice President (2022–2024).

== Family background ==
Karan Bilimoria was born in Hyderabad, India into a Zoroastrian Parsi family which hailed from Gujarat. As the surname 'Bilimoria' denotes, the ancestral home of the family is the small town of Bilimora, situated on the banks of the river Ambika, in Gandevi taluka of Navsari district of Gujarat state.

Bilimoria's family had a strong background in trade and commerce, but his father and both his grandfathers served in the Indian armed forces. In 1931, his paternal grandfather, Nasservanji D. Bilimoria, was one of the first Indians to be commissioned as an officer into the Indian Army from the Royal Military College, Sandhurst, and he retired as a Brigadier.

Bilimoria's father, Faridoon Noshir Bilimoria (1933–2005), popularly known as 'General Billy', had a long and distinguished career in the Indian Army. As a young, newly commissioned officer, he served as ADC to the first President of India, Rajendra Prasad. Many years later, he commanded the 2/5 Gorkha Rifles (Frontier Force) during the Bangladesh Liberation War. He later served as General Officer Commanding-in-Chief of the Indian Army's Central Command. In 1990, while serving at that post, F. N. Bilimoria was deputed by the Government of India to Sri Lanka to review the work of the Indian Peace Keeping Force, which had been deployed in that country during the Sri Lankan Civil War under the Indo-Sri Lanka Accord. It was on his recommendation that the force was recalled in 1990, ending India's military engagement with the LTTE.

Karan Bilimoria's mother, Yasmin Bilimoria (née Italia), was the daughter of Jamshed D. Italia, a Squadron Leader in the Royal Indian Air Force. Her mother, Aimai Italia née Bharucha of Hyderabad, was the daughter of D.D. Italia, a Hyderabad-based businessman and politician who served as a member of the Rajya Sabha in the 1950s (this was Karan's maternal great-grandfather). Both his mother and maternal grandfather were educated in Britain at Birmingham University.

== Education ==
Bilimoria did his early schooling in Hyderabad from Hyderabad Public School at Begumpet, Hyderabad where the family lived at his mother's ancestral home, Anand Bhavan, while his father served in different military stations in the country. As he grew, his family began to accompany his father, and Bilimoria attended seven different schools before he was sent to board at Hebron School in the Nilgiris, Tamil Nadu, alongside his younger brother, Nadir. When he was still nineteen, Karan received his Bachelor of Commerce degree from Osmania University in Hyderabad in 1981.

On receiving a scholarship, he then moved to London where he qualified as a chartered accountant with what is today Ernst & Young and received a diploma in accounting from the London Metropolitan University. Thereafter he read law at Sidney Sussex College, Cambridge. While at Cambridge, Bilimoria played on the university's polo team, organising their first ever tour of India, receiving a Half-Blue in 1988, and led the debating team against Oxford for two years, becoming also the vice-president of the Cambridge Union before graduating in 1988.

During the India tour of the Cambridge University polo team, Bilimoria noticed that the polo sticks made in India were different and of better quality than those made in Britain. At the time, polo sticks made in Argentina were very popular but following the Falklands War, imports of Argentinian products into Britain had been banned and there was little competition to British manufacturers. Bilimoria began to import polo sticks from India to fill in the gap, selling these successfully and profitably to Harrods and Lillywhites.

== Cobra Beer ==
In 1989, along with his friend Arjun Reddy, Bilimoria founded Cobra Beer in a flat in Fulham. The idea for the beer had come up while he was a student at Cambridge, where he regularly ate his meals at Indian restaurants. He noticed that regular lager was too gassy and bloating to be enjoyed with food, while ale was too bitter to accompany a meal. He came up with a concept for a beer that had 'the refreshing qualities of a lager' but the 'smoothness and drinkability of an ale' to accompany food – in particular, Indian food and curry. In 1989, after concluding his import-export ventures, Bilimoria and Arjun Reddy started Cobra Beer.

At the time Bilimoria had a student debt of £20,000, and funds to start the business were not easy to find. Borrowing money from various sources and £30,000 from a bank, Cobra commenced operations. A brewer in Bangalore, India, Subroto Cariapa, and the owner of Mysore Breweries, a Mr Balan, liked the idea of the beer and helped create Cobra. From India, then, it was imported to Britain. In a battered old Citroen 2CV, Bilimoria himself began distributing 15 cases of beer at a time across London and, slowly, outside it.

Since marketing on a large scale was not an option because of the paucity of funds, penetrating Britain's highly competitive beer market required an innovative approach. The task was made all the more challenging because by 1990 the country was also in an economic recession. Cobra took off in these circumstances by creating a niche for itself in the market. Indian curry was becoming increasingly popular in the country at the time and so Cobra Beer was marketed and sold as the perfect drink to go with it. Bilimoria delivered cases of Cobra to Indian restaurants, where it became very popular with customers. Within five years, the one million mark in sales revenues was crossed. Cobra began to be served across the United Kingdom in thousands of Indian restaurants and the business began to grow, expanding into the pub and bar sector and also being sold in major supermarket chains. In 1999, the company diversified into wine.

By 2001 Cobra, from which Bilimoria's partner had now exited, had a turnover of nearly £13 million with a sales growth rate of nearly 60% per year, and was being brewed locally in the UK by Charles Wells Ltd. By 2007 Cobra was being sold in over 45 countries, and had a total production capacity of 450,000 cases per month. Revenues stood at £30 million and, with rapid expansion, were expected to cross £100 million by 2010.

In May 2009 the company went into administration. The company owed an estimated £70 million to creditors. Molson Coors, one of the world's largest brewers, then paid circa £14 million for a 50.1% share in a pre-pack administration deal, leaving Bilimoria and his shareholders with the other 49.9%, and signed a joint venture deal under the name the Cobra Beer Partnership, of which Bilimoria is chairman. In October 2009 Bilimoria stated that the creditors of Cobra Beer would be settled out of future profits of the joint venture.

== Panama Papers controversy ==
Bilimoria's name came up in the Panama Papers leak: he was listed as a shareholder in Mulberry Holdings Asset Limited, a company registered in the Virgin Islands. However, he released a statement claiming that the company was dormant and had been formed for his ex-shareholders in Cobra, who were not residents of the UK; furthermore he stated that he was taxed on all of his global income in the UK and had declared his interests to the authorities. As a result of these allegations the University of Birmingham Branch of the UCU called for an investigation into his finances in 2016; the university had released a statement the day before calling it a personal matter, referencing Bilimoria's previous statement to the media.

== Honours and positions ==
Bilimoria was appointed as a Deputy Lieutenant for Greater London in 2001 and he was appointed a Commander of the Order of the British Empire (CBE) in the 2004 Birthday Honours for his services to business and entrepreneurship. He was appointed an Independent Crossbench Life Peer in the House of Lords and was created Baron Bilimoria, of Chelsea in the Royal Borough of Kensington and Chelsea on 16 June 2006. He is the first Zoroastrian Parsi to sit in the House of Lords.

Bilimoria has been a non-executive director and senior independent director of the Booker Group PLC, the UK's largest wholesale operator, since 2007. In 2011 he became chairman of Molson Coors Cobra India, a joint venture between Cobra Beer and Molson Coors in India. He was awarded an honorary doctorate from Heriot-Watt University in 2005. On 17 July 2014, Bilimoria was installed as the 7th Chancellor of the University of Birmingham. In 2016, Bilimoria was appointed as chairman on the advisory board of the Judge Business School at the University of Cambridge. He served as the Bynum Tudor Fellow of Kellogg College, Oxford for the 2017–18 academic year. Further, on 19 June 2023, Bilimoria was appointed as Patron of Small Business Charter.

In June 2020, Bilimoria was elected as the President of the Confederation of British Industry for a two-year term. After completing this term, he served as the Vice President of the CBI until June 2024.

In September 2020, Bilimoria was appointed as a Visiting Fellow at the University of Oxford based at the Centre for Corporate Reputation.

He has been awarded honorary doctorates from the University of East Anglia, University of Birmingham, Brunel University, Cranfield University, University of Exeter, Heriot-Watt University, London Metropolitan University, Staffordshire University, York St John University, University of West London (previously Thames Valley University), and University of Westminster.

Bilimoria was formerly the President of The UK Council on International Student Affairs (UKCISA), and Co-chair of the All-Party Parliamentary Group (APPG) for International Students.

He joined Policy Exchange and the ICC (International Chamber of Commerce) as a Board Member in 2022.

== Personal life ==
In 1993 he married Lynne Heather Walker, a South African national.

== Arms ==
Coat of arms of Karan Bilimoria, Baron Bilimoria
| Crest An Indian elephant trunk elevated Or the dexter forefoot resting upon a tun palewise Azure banded Or. Escutcheon Quarterly Gules and Azure an urn Argent enflamed between four demi-suns in splendour in saltire Or. Supporters Dexter a representation of a winged bull with a human head at the gatehouse of Xerxes at Persepolis Or the wings Gules the underside Azure; sinister a winged lion Or the wings Gules the underside Azure. Motto Aspira Et Confice (Aspire And Accomplish) |

== Publications ==
- 2007: Bottled for Business: The Less Gassy Guide to Entrepreneurship (London: Capstone) with Steve Coomber, ISBN 1-841-12726-4
- 2009: Against the Grain: Lessons in Entrepreneurship from the Founder of Cobra Beer (London: Capstone), ISBN 1906465487

Academic offices
| Preceded by Sir Dominic Cadbury | Chancellor of the University of Birmingham; 2014–2024 | Succeeded by Sandie Okoro |
Orders of precedence in the United Kingdom
| Preceded by The Lord Dear | Gentlemen; Baron Bilimoria | Followed by The Lord Jay of Ewelme |
