= Alex Jarratt =

British businessman and civil servant (1924–2019)

Sir Alexander Anthony Jarratt CB DL (19 January 1924 – 19 December 2019) was a British businessman and senior civil servant. He was the fifth Chancellor of Birmingham University. He chaired a Committee of Vice-Chancellors and Principals studying higher education policy; the committee's influential report became known as the Jarratt Report.

Jarratt attended the Royal Liberty School in Essex. He served in the Fleet Air Arm during the Second World War. After the war he attended the University of Birmingham, graduating with first class honours as a Bachelor of Commerce. He joined the Civil Service in 1949, working in a wide range of government departments. He resigned from the Civil Service in 1970, and pursued a second career in industry, holding senior positions in companies including IPC, Reed International and the Midland Bank. Chairman and chief executive. He was also appointed in 1970 to the board of the parent company, Reed International Limited. From 1974 to 1982 Sir Alex was chairman and chief executive of Reed International. Between 1985 and 1991 he was chairman of Smiths Industries plc.

Sir Alex was knighted in 1979 and was appointed a Companion of the Order of the Bath in 1968.

He was appointed chancellor of the University of Birmingham in 1983 and retired in 2002, to be succeeded by Sir Dominic Cadbury.

He was a Deputy Lieutenant of Essex.

He died on 19 December 2019 at the age of 95.

== See also ==
International Who's Who 2004

Academic offices
Preceded by Peter Scott	Chancellor of the University of Birmingham; 1983–2002	Succeeded by Dominic Cadbury
