= Duncan Rice =

British academic (1942–2022)

Sir Duncan Rice

Principal of the University of Aberdeen
- In office 1996–2010
- Preceded by: Maxwell Irvine
- Succeeded by: Sir Ian Diamond

Personal details
- Born: 20 October 1942 Aberdeen, Aberdeenshire, Scotland
- Died: 3 February 2022 (aged 79)
- Spouse: Dame Susan Rice
- Education: University of Aberdeen; University of Edinburgh
- Profession: Historian

Sir Charles Duncan Rice (20 October 1942 – 3 February 2022) was a Scottish academic who was Principal of the University of Aberdeen from September 1996 to 1 April 2010. He previously served at New York University in the United States, as Dean of the Faculty of Arts and Science (1985–91) and Vice-Chancellor (1991–96).

== Early life ==
Rice was born in Aberdeen, Aberdeenshire, and studied History at the University of Aberdeen, graduating with a First in 1964. He then began lecturing at the University while completing a PhD at the University of Edinburgh, awarded in 1969.

== Career ==
In 1970, Rice was appointed assistant professor of history at Yale University, and was promoted to associate professor in 1975. In 1979, he was appointed professor of history at Hamilton College, in Clinton, New York, and in 1985 as professor of history and dean of the Faculty of Arts and Science at New York University, being promoted to vice-chancellor in 1994. In 1996, he was appointed principal of the University of Aberdeen.

Rice published widely as a professional historian, and received honorary degrees from New York University and the Robert Gordon University in Aberdeen as well as fellowships at Harvard and Yale, and the Royal Society of Edinburgh. He served on the Heritage Lottery Fund Committee for Scotland, was honorary vice-president of Scottish Opera and chair of the Council for the Advancement and Support of Education (Europe).

He has previously served on the boards of Scottish Enterprise Grampian, Scottish Opera/Ballet, BT Scotland, and The National Trust for Scotland. He was chairman of the Circumpolar Universities Association from 1997–1999, was a former chairman of the UK Socrates-Erasmus Trust, and a former member of the Universities and Colleges Employers Association board. He was knighted in 2009 for services to higher education.

== Personal life and death ==
He was married to the banker Dame Susan Rice. Rice died on 3 February 2022, at the age of 79.

== Notable publications ==
- The Rise and Fall of Black Slavery (1975)
- The Scots Abolitionists 1833–1861 (1981)

== Legacy ==
The Sir Duncan Rice Library was completed in 2011. It was designed by Schmidt Hammer Lassen. Initially it was known as Aberdeen University New Library, but on 21 September 2012 the building's name was changed to honour Rice, who had been Principal of the university during the time that the project was conceived and the funds were raised. The library was opened by the Queen on 24 September 2012.

Academic offices
Preceded by Maxwell Irvine	Principal and Vice-Chancellor of the University of Aberdeen; 1996—2010	Succeeded by Sir Ian Diamond
