= Nairn Academy =

Location
- Duncan Drive; Nairn, IV12 4RD; Scotland
- Coordinates: 57.5785°N 3.8820°W

Information
- Type: Comprehensive
- Motto: Fac Et Spera
- Established: 1832; 194 years ago
- Age: 11 to 18
- Houses: Jubilee, Merryton, Dulsie (local bridges)

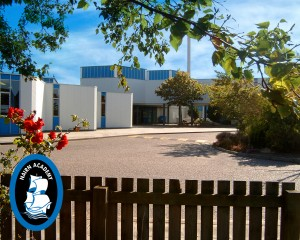
Nairn Academy

Nairn Academy is a secondary school in Nairn, Scotland. The school currently has a roll of 651 pupils.

== History ==
The school was founded in 1832. Until 1953, the school had been known as Rose's Academical Institution, in honour of an early benefactor, Captain James Rose, RN. From 1953 onwards it has been known as Nairn Academy and was formerly housed in what is now Rosebank Primary School. By 1969, the school had grown to outstrip its former site and a new building was planned and subsequently erected at the western end of the town. The new school was first occupied in January 1976, and was formally opened in June that year.

In 2008, the school went under reconstruction for a new science facilities. There was also a large removal of asbestos from the building resulting in a closure of several weeks. The new science building offers students better access to studies and practical experimentation.

== Recent years ==
An extension was opened in August 1993 which provides specialized accommodation. Included in the area are toilet facilities for pupils with physical handicaps, a physiotherapy suite and teaching areas for pupils with severe or profound learning difficulties.

In October 2008 a new Support for Learning Base and Science Department was officially opened.

Nairn Academy has 4 associated Primary Schools:

- Auldearn Primary School
- Cawdor Primary School
- Millbank Primary School
- Rosebank Primary School

Throughout the six years, from Secondary 1 to 6, the years are split into registration classes and further, each registration class is halved to a point class. For example, 1Y would have 1.1 and 1.2; this is for the purpose of making practical classes more applicable. This is only in effect for the first two years of education, after which each student will choose their own subjects and will then have their classes allocated based on their course choices.

From March 2020 to August 2020, Nairn Academy was closed due to COVID-19 pandemic.

There are plans to rebuild the school.

== Notable former pupils ==
- Ann Coffey (Labour MP)
- James Alastair Taylor (Sheriff Principal of Glasgow and Strathkelvin)
- Fraser Nelson (journalist, Editor of The Spectator)
- James Augustus Grant (Scottish explorer, discovered the source of the Nile with John Hanning Speke)
- Nicholas Ralph (actor)
- Fraser Noble
