= Fraser Nelson =

British political journalist (born 1973)

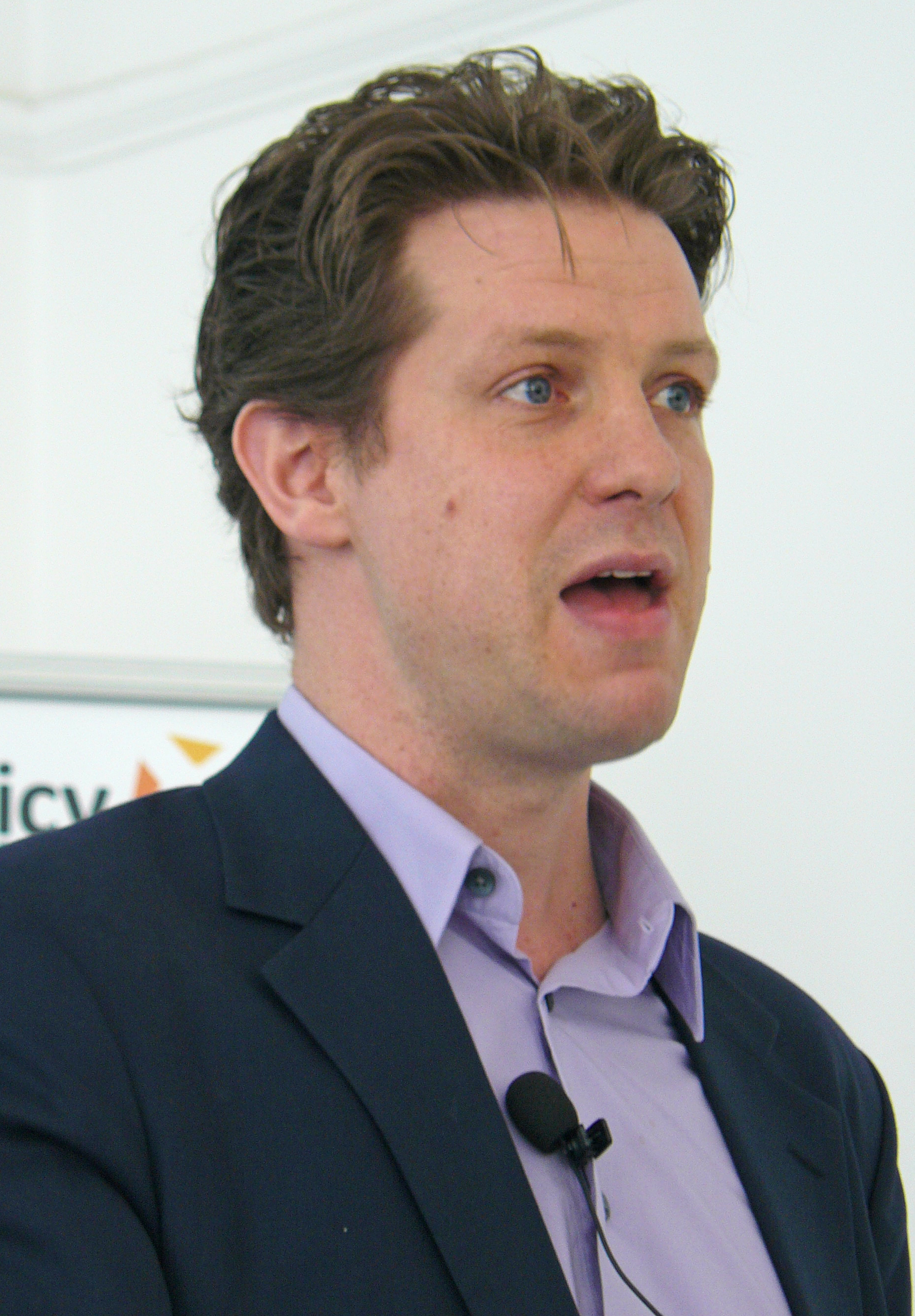
- Nelson in 2012
- Born: Fraser Andrew Nelson; 14 May 1973 (age 53); Truro, Cornwall, England
- Education: Nairn Academy; Dollar Academy; University of Glasgow; City University
- Occupations: Journalist; Columnist of The Times
- Spouse: Linda Nelson (m. 2006)
- Children: 3

Fraser Andrew Nelson (born 14 May 1973) is a British political journalist and columnist for The Times. He was editor of The Spectator magazine from 2009 to 2024.

== Early life ==
Nelson was born in Truro, Cornwall, England and raised in Nairn, Highland, Scotland. He attended Nairn Academy before boarding at Dollar Academy while his father, who was in the Royal Air Force, was posted to Cyprus. He described himself as "one of a handful of Catholics at a Protestant school." He studied history and politics at the University of Glasgow where he was editor of the university's student newspaper Glasgow University Guardian. He gained a diploma in journalism at City, University of London.

== Career ==
=== Journalism ===
Nelson began his journalistic career as a business reporter with The Times in 1997, followed by a short spell as Scottish political correspondent. At a party he met Andrew Neil, then editor of The Scotsman who recruited him as its political editor in 2001. In 2003 he moved to The Business, a sister title of The Scotsman in the Barclay brothers' Press Holdings group.

In July 2004 the brothers bought the Telegraph Group, which included The Spectator and in December 2005 they sold The Scotsman Publications Ltd. Neil had been appointed Chief Executive of The Spectator after the Barclays bought it, and in 2006 he brought in Nelson as associate editor and then political editor of the magazine. He replaced Matthew d'Ancona as editor of The Spectator when the latter left in August 2009. Under his editorship, the magazine reached a record high in print circulation.

In September 2024, Nelson was replaced as editor of The Spectator by Michael Gove, after its acquisition by Paul Marshall. The New Statesman reported that Spectator staff were shocked at Nelson being replaced, after Nelson had written an article praising Marshall when the acquisition was announced. One week earlier, Nelson had told the British Society of Magazine Editors that he expected to have little contact with Marshall, and that editors should "actively ignore" suggestions from owners, adding: "If you get sacked for it, you get sacked for it – but you hold the line. Famous last words."

=== Awards and lists ===
Nelson was named Political Columnist of the Year in the 2009 Comment Awards. In 2013, the Evening Standard named Nelson as one of the most influential journalists working in London. The British Society of Magazine Editors named Nelson the 2013 Editors' Editor of the Year. In the same year he won the British Press Award as Political Journalist of the Year. He was the BSME’s editor of the year (current affairs) in both 2021 and 2023, won a Wincott award for his 2024 Channel 4 documentary on welfare and was named Columnist of the Year in the 2025 British Journalism Awards.

=== Other ===
Nelson is a board director of the Centre for Policy Studies think tank.

== Views ==
Nelson is a supporter of the Conservative Party. In 2013, he said The Spectator magazine under his editorship was "right of centre, but not strongly right of centre". During the 2010–2015 coalition government, he was generally supportive of David Cameron's leadership and praised Cameron's Liberal Democrat coalition partner from 2010 to 2015, Nick Clegg. Since 2015, he has since been described as including more strongly right wing pundits in The Spectator's line up, and described the magazine's political stance as "centre right" in 2023.

In May 2018 he was heavily criticised for publishing a defence of German troops by Taki Theodoracopulos titled "In praise of the Wehrmacht" which said readers should feel sorry for Wehrmacht soldiers at Normandy.

In several articles in the mid 2010s, Nelson outlined his view of the relative success of immigration to the UK due to the country's liberalism. By 2023, however, Nelson was a critic of mass migration describing migration placing pressure on housing, services, and wages.

Nelson's other views have included supporting religious freedom in relation to gay marriage and concern over the impact on children of rising rates of divorce and illegitimacy.

== Personal life ==
Married with two sons and a daughter, Nelson and his family live in southwest London. He is married to Linda, a Swede, and said in 2014, "I am a soppy Europhile who speaks a second language at home. The idea of a united Europe was one that really excited me when I was younger, and which I love now."

Media offices
Preceded by Matthew d'Ancona	Editor of The Spectator; 2009–2024	Next: Michael Gove
