= Frank Debenham =

Australian geographer (1883–1965)

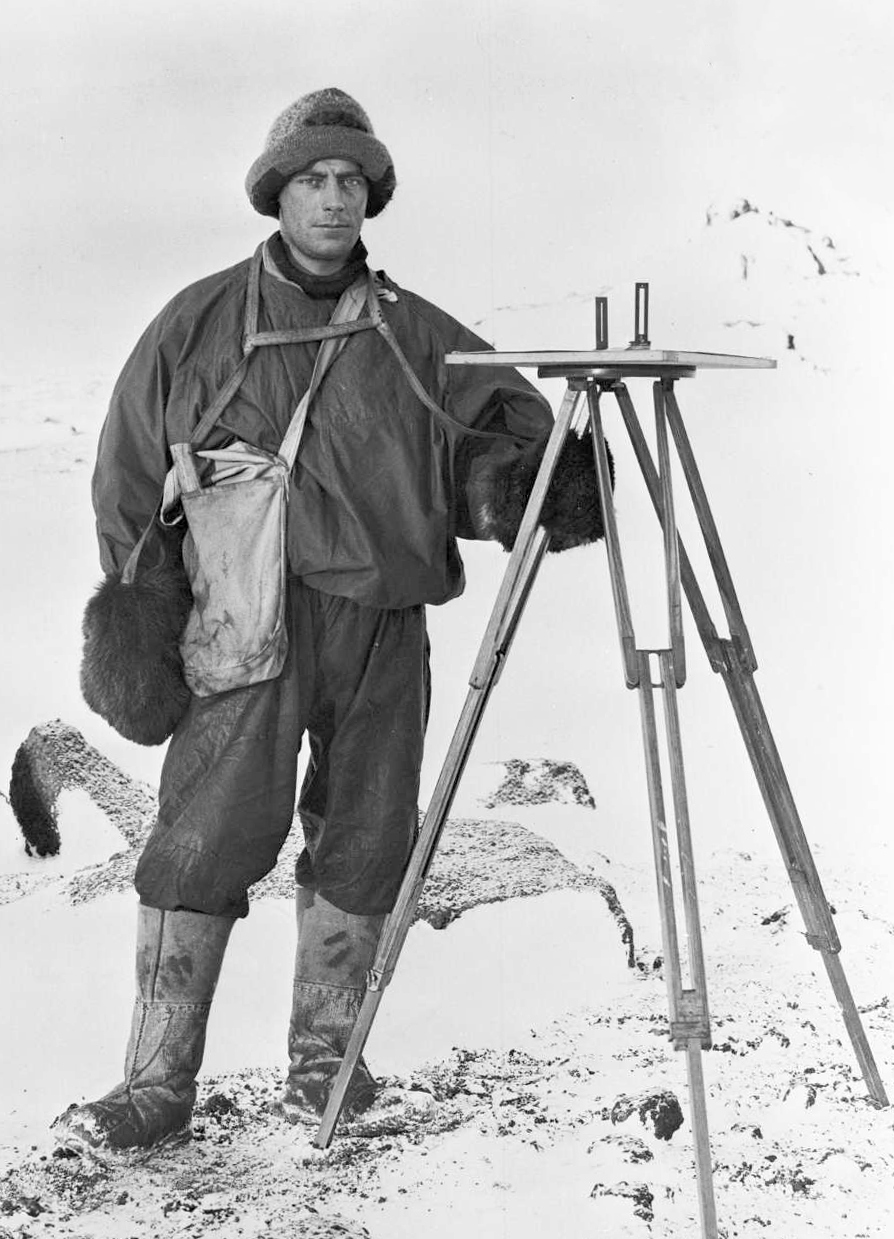
- Frank Debenham during the Terra Nova Expedition in 1911
- Born: 26 December 1883; Bowral, New South Wales, Australia
- Died: 23 November 1965 (aged 81); Cambridge, England
- Education: University of Sydney
- Spouse: Dorothy Lempriere (m. 1917; died 1965)
- Children: 5
- Military career
- Allegiance: United Kingdom
- Branch: British Army
- Rank: Lieutenant
- Units: 7th Battalion, Oxfordshire and Buckinghamshire Light Infantry
- Conflicts: World War I World War II
- Awards: Order of the British Empire (1919)

Frank Debenham, OBE (26 December 1883 – 23 November 1965) was Emeritus Professor of Geography at the Department of Geography, Cambridge University and first director of the Scott Polar Research Institute.

== Biography ==
Debenham was born in Bowral, New South Wales, Australia in December 1883, the younger twin and third child of Rev. John Willmott Debenham and Edith (née Cleveland). He attended the school run by his father before attending The King's School, Parramatta where he was the top academic and sporting student of his year. He graduated from the University of Sydney with a BA in English and philosophy, then joined the staff at the Anglican Armidale School in New South Wales.

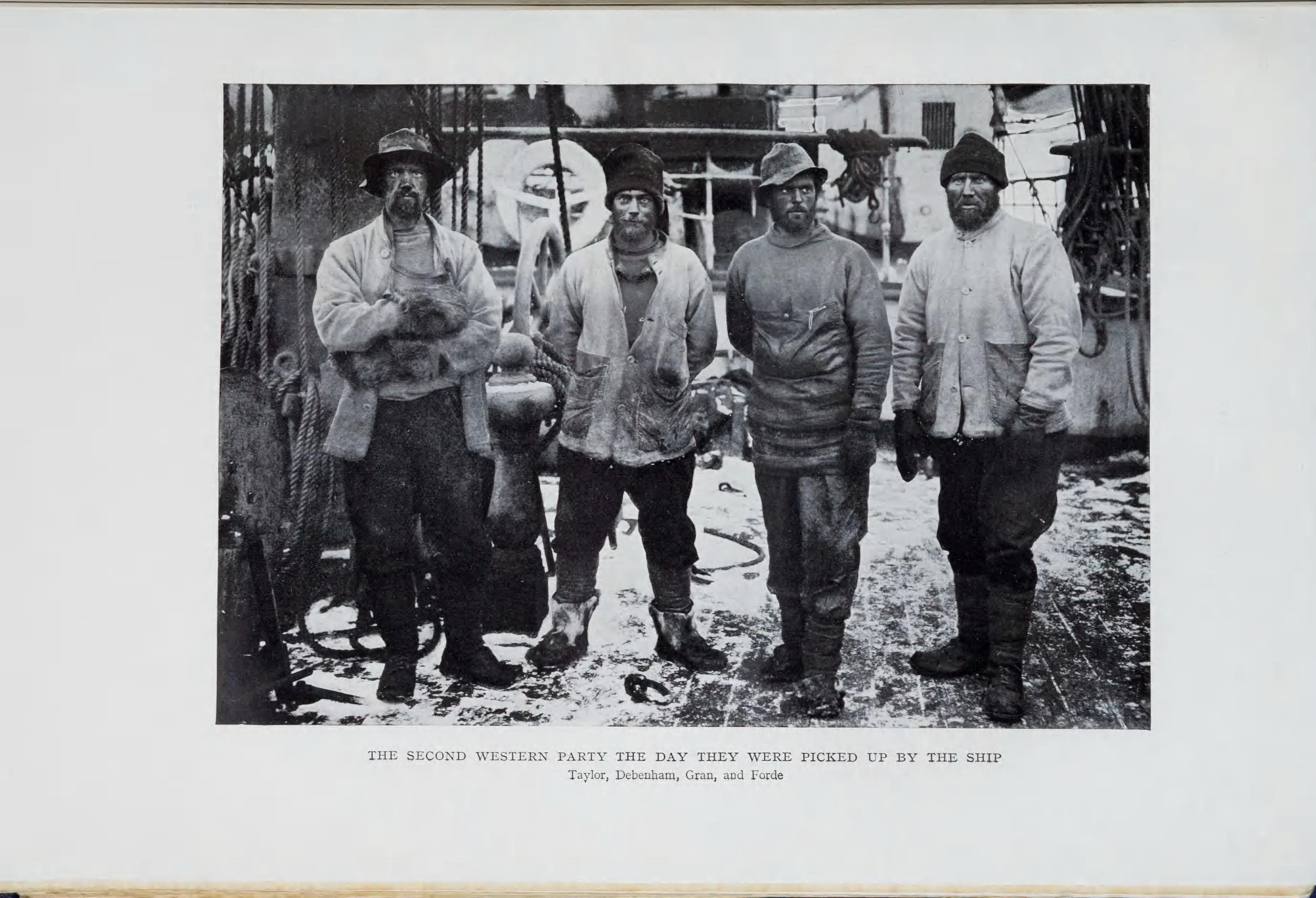
The second western party (Thomas Griffith Taylor, Debenham, Tryggve Gran and Robert Forde) aboard ship at the end of their journey (February 1912)

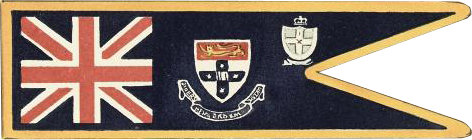
Sledge flag used by Debenham in Antarctica during the Terra Nova Expedition

He returned to Sydney University in 1908, studying geology under Sir Edgeworth David. In 1910 he was one of a group of three geologists on Robert Falcon Scott's Antarctic Terra Nova Expedition (1910–1913). From January to March 1911 Debenham, along with three other expedition members (Thomas Griffith Taylor, Charles Wright and Edgar Evans), explored and mapped the western mountains of Victoria Land (the western journey) performing scientific studies and geological observations. He did not take part in the ill-fated journey to the South Pole due to a knee injury sustained while playing football in the snow, and instead took part in the second western journey along with Griffith Taylor, Tryggve Gran and Robert Forde. On his return from the expedition in 1913, he entered Cambridge University to write up his field notes.

During World War I, he was a lieutenant with the 7th Battalion, Oxfordshire and Buckinghamshire Light Infantry, serving in France and Salonika, and was severely wounded in August 1916, eventually being demobilized with the rank of major. He married Dorothy Lucy Lempriere in January 1917 and was awarded the Order of the British Empire (O.B.E.) in 1919. The same year he returned to Cambridge, where he became a fellow of Gonville and Caius College and lecturer in cartography. In 1920, with the help of surplus funds raised by public donations in response to the tragedy, Debenham co-founded the Scott Polar Research Institute (Cambridge University) with Raymond Priestley, as a repository of polar information and a centre from which future expeditions could draw on support and experience. Debenham had developed the idea of such a learning centre in 1912 while in Antarctica. He was unpaid director of the Institute from 1920 to 1946. As director of the institute, Debenham, in conjunction with Priestley and one of Shackleton's Endurance scientists, James Wordie, made Cambridge the centre of polar research in Britain.

In 1926, Debenham was appointed to a lectureship in geography at the University of Cambridge. In 1931, Debenham was appointed as the first Professor of Geography in Cambridge. During World War II he trained service cadets, lectured to Royal Air Force navigators and devised relief-model techniques for briefing commandos. Author of Astrographics: First Steps in Navigation by the Stars, the two editions in 1942 were important works for the R.A.F.'s Bomber offensive against Nazi Germany. He was vice-president of the Royal Geographical Society (1951–53) and was awarded their Victoria Medal in 1948, in addition to the American Geographical Society David Livingstone Centenary Medal that year.

Debenham was a prolific author; his published works include: Map Making (1947); The Use of Geography (1950); In the Antarctic: Stories of Scott's "Last Expedition" (1952); Study of an African Swamp (1952); Kalahari Sand (1953); Nyasaland: The Land of the Lake (1955); The Way to Ilala: David Livingstone's Pilgrimage (1955); The World is Round (1958); Space: The Global Atlas (1958); Antarctica: The Story of a Continent (1959); Discovery and Exploration: An Atlas-history of Man's Journeys into the Unknown (1960); Simple Surveying for Farmers (1961).

== Death and legacy ==
Frank Debenham died in Cambridge in 1965, aged 81.

He is commemorated by two buildings at Cambridge and by a mountain, Debenham Peak and a glacier in Antarctica. His portrait by H. A. Freeth is held by the Scott Polar Research Institute.

In 2019, an ice pick that belonged to Debenham was auctioned for £22,000 by Cheffins Fine Art Auctioneers.
