= Raymond Priestley =

English geologist and Antarctic explorer (1886–1974)

Sir Raymond Priestley MC
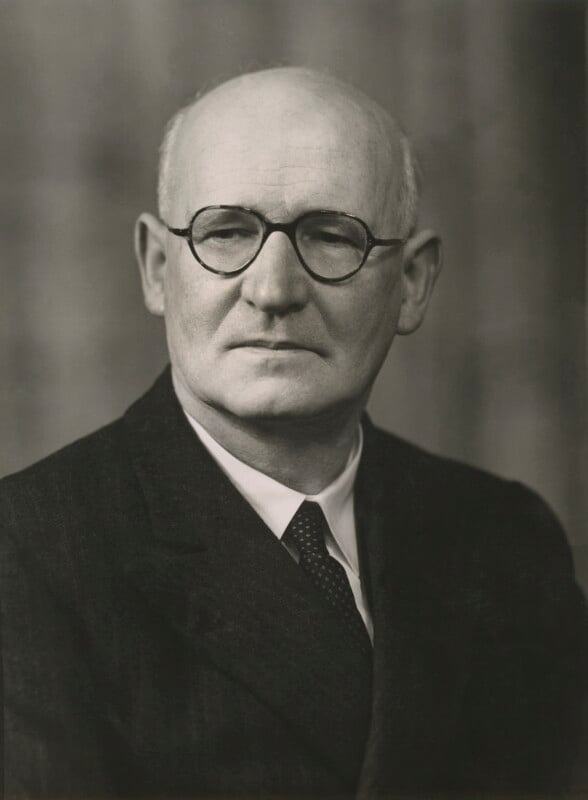
- Priestley in 1949

Vice-Chancellor, University of Birmingham
- In office 3 October 1938 – 30 July 1952
- Preceded by: Sir Charles Robertson
- Succeeded by: Humphrey Humphreys

Vice-Chancellor, University of Melbourne
- In office 18 February 1935 – 30 June 1938
- Preceded by: Sir James Barrett
- Succeeded by: Sir John Medley

Personal details
- Born: Raymond Edward Priestley; 20 July 1886 Tewkesbury, England
- Died: 24 June 1974 (aged 87) Cheltenham, England
- Education: University College, Bristol; University of Cambridge
- Occupation: Geologist, polar explorer
- Civilian awards: Knight Bachelor (1949); Royal Geographical Society's Patron's Medal (1959)

Military service
- Branch: British Army
- Service years: 1914–1926
- Rank: Major
- Corps: Royal Engineers; Royal Corps of Signals
- Conflict: World War I
- Awards: Military Cross (1919)

Sir Raymond Edward Priestley MC (20 July 1886 – 24 June 1974) was an English geologist and early Antarctic explorer. He was Vice-Chancellor of the University of Birmingham, where he helped found The Raymond Priestley Centre on the shores of Coniston Water in the Lake District National Park.

== Biography ==
Raymond Priestley was born in Tewkesbury, Gloucestershire, in 1886, the second son and second of eight children of Joseph Edward Priestley, headmaster of Tewkesbury grammar school, and his wife, Henrietta Rice. He was educated at his father's school and taught there for a year before reading geology at University College, Bristol (1905–07).

== Antarctic expeditions ==
Priestley had completed his second year of studies when he enlisted as a geologist for Shackleton's Nimrod Expedition (1907–09) to Antarctica. There he worked closely with renowned geologists (Sir) Edgeworth David and Douglas Mawson, also members of the expedition. Priestley collected mineral and lichen samples from the region including islands in the Ross Sea, the North face of the Mount Erebus volcano, and mountains near the Ferrar Glacier. He was part of the advance team that laid the food and fuel depots for Shackleton's nearly successful attempt to be the first to reach the South Pole in 1909. In a November 1908 expedition, due to a lack of space in a tent, Priestley spent three days of a blizzard sleeping outside in his sleeping bag. As the blizzard raged, he slowly slipped down the glacier and nearly fell off its end to his death. On his return from the expedition, he spent four months in England before returning to Sydney, Australia, to work with Edgeworth David on the geological report, eventually published in 1914.

Priestley returned to the Antarctic as a member of Robert Falcon Scott's ill-fated Terra Nova Expedition (1910–1913), after being recruited by Scott when the Terra Nova arrived in Sydney. Three weeks after landing at Cape Evans in January 1911, Priestley and five others departed in the expedition ship, the Terra Nova to explore and carry out scientific work in King Edward VII land to the east under the leadership of Victor Campbell. Unable to find a suitable landing site, they decided to return West with the intention of landing at the Bay of Whales but arriving on 3 February 1911 they encountered Roald Amundsen's ship Fram and his expedition already camped there. Unwilling to establish a camp so close to the Norwegians, Campbell decided to explore the coastline of Victoria Land instead. After returning to Cape Evans and reporting Amundsen's location to Scott, they set off North to Victoria Land where they established a hut near Carsten Borchgrevink's 1898 site at Cape Adare. In January 1912, the six-man party was taken 200 miles farther south by the Terra Nova to Terra Nova Bay, midway between Cape Evans and Cape Adare, for summer fieldwork. They had provisions for eight weeks but their tents were badly damaged by a gale, and the Terra Nova was unable to penetrate the ice pack and pick up the party as arranged. Realising that they would have to winter where they were, they excavated a small 12 foot by 9 foot ice cave in a snow drift and remained there in the shelter they nicknamed "Inexpressible Island" for almost 7 months until the end of the Austral winter, supplementing their meagre rations with seal and penguin. With two of the party weak from enteritis, they left their temporary home on 30 September 1912 and walked for five weeks, fortuitously finding a cache of food and fuel along the way which had been left by the expedition's western party the previous year. They eventually arrived safely back at Cape Evans on 7 November 1912, only to be informed that Scott and the entire Polar party had perished months earlier.

== First World War ==
Priestley served in the British Army during World War I, receiving a commission as a temporary second lieutenant in the Royal Engineers (London Wireless Signal Company) on 5 September 1914. He was seconded on 9 December 1914, and was appointed an adjutant and promoted to temporary lieutenant on 15 April 1915. Priestley served as adjutant at the Wireless Training Centre (1914–17), then with the 46th (North Midland) Divisional Signal Company R.E. in France, and was promoted to temporary captain on 5 February 1916. He commanded the 46th (North Midland) Divisional Signal Company R.E. from 1917 to 1919, and was involved in the taking of the Riqueval Bridge, part of the Hindenburg line, by the 137th Infantry Brigade, for which he was awarded the Military Cross in March 1919:

Lt. (T/Capt.) Raymond Edward Priestley, 46th (N. Mid.) Div. Coy., R.E., T.F. Near Bellenglise on 2nd, 3rd and 4th October, 1918, he was in charge of the executive handling of the signal communications and was mainly instrumental in keeping touch with units during the attack on Ramicourt and Montbrehain. His efficiency and enthusiasm were most marked. He showed utter disregard of danger during his duty on the lines over the whole of the shelled area.

== Post-war career ==
After the war, Priestley was promoted to acting major on 24 January 1919, and was seconded to the War Office that year to write the history of the signal service. He also wrote "Breaking the Hindenburg Line", an account of 46 (North Midland) Division's spectacular attack during the Battle of St Quentin Canal. During April–May 1919, he was a staff officer to the Signal Officer-in-Chief, with the temporary rank of major. He relinquished his temporary commission on 17 November 1920, reverting to the permanent rank of lieutenant in the Territorial Force. From 19 February 1921, he again held the temporary rank of major in the reserves, in the 3rd London, Royal Corps of Signals. On 6 July 1921, he was commissioned a lieutenant in the Cambridge University Contingent (Senior Division), Officers Training Corps. He was promoted to captain on 21 June 1922 and resigned his commission on 30 June 1926, retaining the rank of major.

His research and thesis on glaciers in the Antarctic earned him a BA (Research) at Cambridge in 1920. The same year, he co-founded, with fellow Terra Nova expedition member Frank Debenham, the Scott Polar Research Institute in Cambridge. In 1922, Priestley was elected fellow of Clare College. In 1924 he joined the university's administrative staff, becoming concurrently assistant registrar, secretary to the board of research studies and secretary-general of the faculties. From the 1930s until his retirement, he held a series of academic and government administrative posts in Australia and England. He was Vice-Chancellor of the University of Melbourne from 1935 until resigning in 1938 on a matter of principle after one of several confrontations with the Chancellor. He returned to Britain to be Vice-Chancellor of the University of Birmingham (1938–52). He was knighted for Services to Education in the 1949 New Year Honours. During this period he developed an acquaintance with the philosopher Ludwig Wittgenstein, providing him with rooms for discussions and lectures.

After retirement in 1952, he served as Chairman of the Royal Commission on the Civil Service from 1953 to 1955, as deputy Director of the former Falkland Islands Dependencies Survey (later called the British Antarctic Survey) from 1955 to 1958, and as president of the British Association for the Advancement of Science (1956). He revisited Antarctica in 1956 and 1959 and in the latter year was awarded the Patron's Medal of the Royal Geographical Society, for whom he was president from 1961 to 1963.

== Personal ==
He married Phyllis Mary Boyd (d.1961) in April 1915. He was the brother-in-law of fellow Terra Nova Expedition members C. S. Wright and Thomas Griffith Taylor.

He died, aged 87, on 24 June 1974 in Cheltenham, Gloucestershire, survived by his two daughters.

Items from Priestley are in the collection of Tewkesbury Borough Museum. Papers relating to his period as Vice-Chancellor of the University of Melbourne and slides taken during the Terra Nova expedition are held by the University of Melbourne Archives, while his papers from the University of Birmingham are held at the Cadbury Research Library there.
