= Humphrey Francis Humphreys =

British physician and academic (1885–1977)

Humphrey Francis Humphreys CBE MC TD DL (1885–1977) was a British physician, academic and university administrator.

Humphreys served with the Royal Army Medical Corps during the First World War, earning the Military Cross and Territorial Decoration.

Humphrey Humphreys graduated from the Faculty of Medicine of Birmingham University in 1921 with the degree of Master of Dental Surgery (MDS) for a thesis on 'Function in the evolution of man's dentition.' He was a Professor of Dental Surgery at the University of Birmingham. He was Vice-Chancellor & Principal of the University of Birmingham from 1952 to 1953.

He was made an Officer of the Order of the British Empire in 1928 and a Commander of the Order of the British Empire in 1957.

Academic offices
Preceded by Raymond Priestley	Vice-Chancellor of the University of Birmingham; 1952–1953	Succeeded by Robert Aitken
