= C. S. Wright =

Canadian explorer (1887–1975)

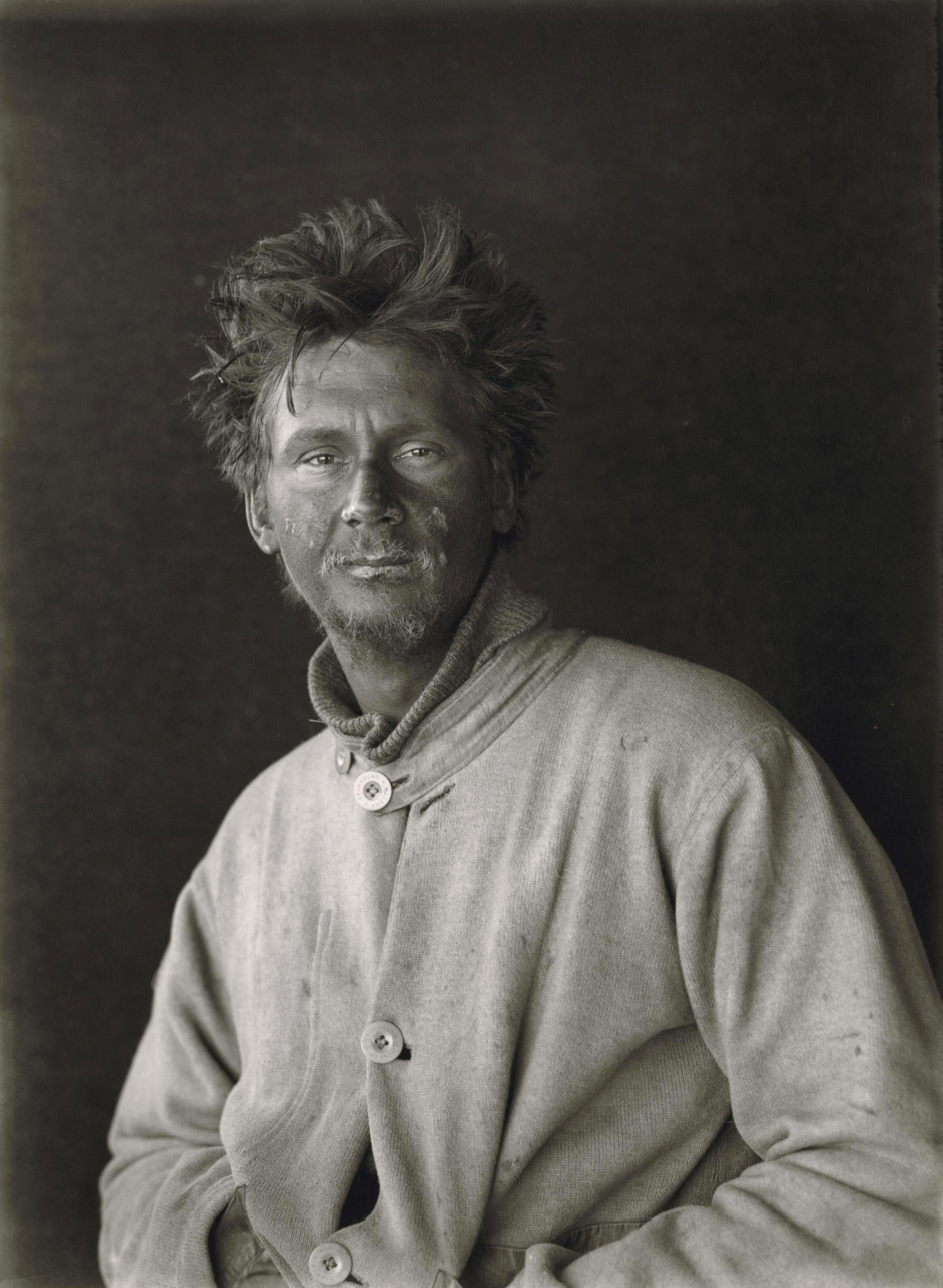
C. S. Wright in January 1912, taken by Herbert Ponting

Sir Charles Seymour Wright KCB OBE MC (7 April 1887 – 1 November 1975), nicknamed Silas Wright after novelist Silas K. Hocking, was a Canadian member of Robert Falcon Scott's Antarctic expedition of 1910–1913, the Terra Nova Expedition.

== Biography ==
Born in Toronto, Ontario, Canada in 1887, the son of an insurance executive, Wright grew up in the Toronto neighbourhood of Rosedale. He was educated at Upper Canada College where he also became head boy. He wore glasses, excelled in sports, and his spirit of adventure saw him spend some of his youth prospecting and canoeing in Canada's unmapped Far North. He studied physics at the University of Toronto and won a scholarship for postgraduate study at Gonville and Caius College, Cambridge, England, undertaking research in cosmic rays at the Cavendish Laboratory from 1908 to 1910. There he met Douglas Mawson, who had recently returned from Ernest Shackleton's 1907–09 British Antarctic Expedition, known as the Nimrod Expedition. Upon learning of Scott's forthcoming expedition to the geographic South Pole, Wright applied to join but was rejected. Undaunted, he walked from Cambridge to London, where he applied in person; this time, Scott accepted, and Wright was hired as expedition glaciologist and assistant physicist.

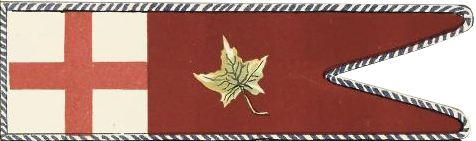
Sledge flag used by Wright in Antarctica during the Terra Nova Expedition

In Antarctica, Wright carried out numerous experiments on ice formations and ground radiation, and assisted meteorologist George Simpson. From January to mid-March 1911, he was one of four expedition members (with Thomas Griffith Taylor, Frank Debenham and Edgar Evans) who explored and mapped the western mountains of Victoria Land (the first western journey), performing scientific studies and geological observations. On 1 November 1911, Wright was a member of the Southern Party team that set off from their base camp at Cape Evans with the intention of reaching the South Pole. He hoped to be included in the polar party selected to accompany Scott on the final push to the Pole; however, on 22 December 1911 at latitude 85° 15' South, seven weeks into the journey, while still 300 mi (480 km) from the pole, he was in the first supporting party which Scott sent back. He spent the next five weeks helping the party navigate the 580 mi (930 km) back to Cape Evans, where they waited for Scott and his party's return from the pole. Scott never arrived. On 12 November 1912, it was Wright, as a member of the 11-man search party led by Edward L. Atkinson, who first spotted the tent containing the bodies of Scott, Edward Wilson, and Henry Robertson Bowers, who had all perished on their return trek from the South Pole eight months earlier.

Upon returning to England, Wright married the sister of fellow Terra Nova Expedition member Raymond Priestley. He lectured in cartography and surveying while also writing up his scientific work.

In 1914, he joined the Royal Engineers as a second lieutenant and served in France. After a distinguished career in the First World War, during which he helped develop trench wireless and gained the Military Cross and the Order of the British Empire (OBE), he joined the Admiralty Research Department in 1919. By 1929 he was superintendent at Teddington and from 1934 to 1936 was director of scientific research at the Admiralty. He was active in the British Admiralty during World War II, playing an important role in the early development of the Allied radar system and developing devices to detect magnetic mines and torpedoes. He was knighted for his work in 1946.

With the formation of the Royal Naval Scientific Service in 1946, he was appointed first chief of the service. He then went to the United States as scientific advisor to the Admiral at the British Joint Services Mission, Washington, D.C., and in 1951 became director of the Marine Physical Laboratory of the Scripps Institution of Oceanography at La Jolla, California. He joined the Defence Research Board of Canada's Pacific Naval Laboratory in 1955 and in 1967 joined the Institute of Earth Sciences, based at the University of British Columbia and Royal Roads Military College, Victoria, British Columbia.

He returned to Antarctica twice, in 1960 and 1965. In 1969, Wright retired to Saltspring Island, British Columbia, Canada, where he died on 1 November 1975, aged 88. His remains were buried at sea off the Canadian destroyer, HMCS Restigouche.

== In popular culture ==
Wright was portrayed by Dennis Vance in the 1948 film Scott of the Antarctic, and by Canadian actor Paul Rothery in the 1985 television serial The Last Place on Earth.
