= Robert Aitken (university administrator) =

New Zealand physician and university administrator (1901–1997)

Sir Robert Aitken FRCP FRCP(Ed) FRACP

Vice-Chancellor of the University of Birmingham
- In office 1953–1968
- Preceded by: H.F. Humphreys
- Succeeded by: Robert Hunter

Vice-Chancellor of the University of Otago
- In office 1948–1953
- Succeeded by: Frederick Soper

Personal details
- Born: Robert Stevenson Aitken; 16 April 1901 Wyndham, New Zealand
- Died: 10 April 1997 (aged 95)
- Education: University of Otago (MBChB, MD); Balliol College, Oxford (DPhil)
- Occupation: Physician; University administrator

Sir Robert Stevenson Aitken (16 April 1901 – 10 April 1997) was a physician and university administrator from New Zealand, vice-chancellor of the University of Otago between 1948 and 1953 and of the University of Birmingham in England between 1953 and 1968.

Born in Wyndham on 16 April 1901, Aitken was educated at Mosgiel District High School and Gisborne High School. He went on to study medicine at the University of Otago, graduating MB ChB in 1922. He played representative field hockey for Otago in 1921 and 1922. In 1924, he was awarded a Rhodes Scholarship, and went to study at Balliol College, Oxford, where he completed a DPhil in 1926. In 1929, Aitken married Margaret Kane, and the couple had three children. In 1939, aged 38, he was appointed Regius Professor of Medicine at the University of Aberdeen.

In 1953, Aitken was awarded the Queen Elizabeth II Coronation Medal. He was appointed a Knight Bachelor in the 1960 Queen's Birthday Honours.

Academic offices
New title	Vice-Chancellor of the University of Otago; 1948–1953	Succeeded by Frederick Soper
Preceded by Humphrey Francis Humphreys	Vice-Chancellor of the University of Birmingham; 1953–1968	Succeeded by Robert Hunter
