= Edward Marsland =

British academic

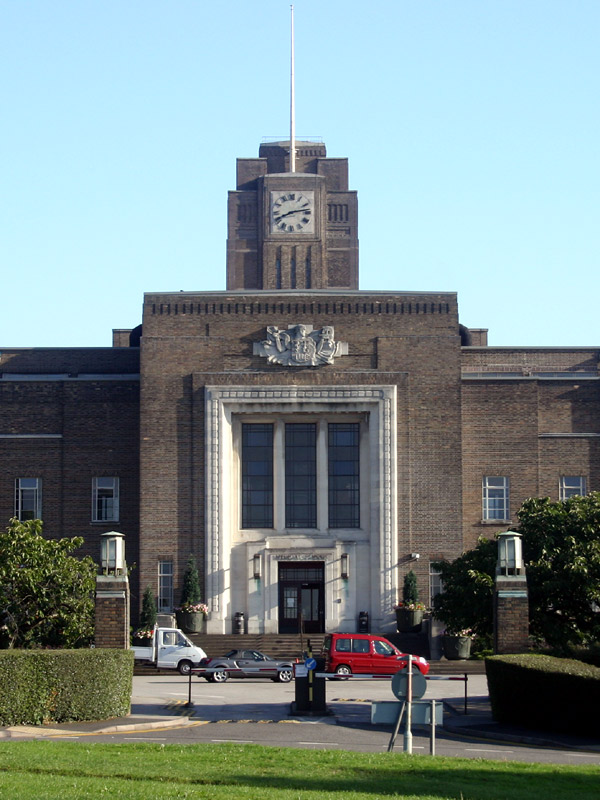
University of Birmingham Medical School

Edward Abson Marsland (18 May 1923 – February 1996) was a British academic who served as Vice-Chancellor of the University of Birmingham.

Marsland received his early education at King Edward's School, Birmingham. He graduated with a PhD degree from the Faculty of Medicine at the University of Birmingham in 1950. His thesis was "A histological investigation of amelogenesis in rats, with special reference to maturation".

Marsland was Professor of Oral Surgery at the University of Birmingham from 1979 to 1982, and Vice-Chancellor of the university from 1982 to 1987.

Academic offices
Preceded by Lord Hunter of Newington	Vice-Chancellor of the University of Birmingham; 1982–1987	Succeeded by Sir Michael Thompson
