= Maxwell Irvine =

British physicist and university administrator

Vice-Chancellor of the University of Birmingham
- In office 1996–2001
- Preceded by: Sir Michael Thompson
- Succeeded by: Sir Michael Sterling

Principal of the University of Aberdeen
- In office 1991–1996
- Preceded by: George Paul McNicol
- Succeeded by: Sir Duncan Rice

Personal details
- Born: 28 February 1939 Morningside, Edinburgh, Scotland
- Died: 24 March 2012 (aged 73) Coniston, Cumbria, England
- Spouse: Grace Ritchie (m. 1962)
- Education: George Heriot's School; University of Edinburgh (MA); University of Michigan (MSc); University of Manchester (PhD)
- Profession: Theoretical physicist, university administrator

John Maxwell Irvine (28 February 1939 – 24 March 2012) was a British theoretical physicist and university administrator, who served as Vice-Chancellor of the University of Birmingham and the Principal and Vice-Chancellor of the Aberdeen.

== Career ==
Maxwell Irvine became Professor of Theoretical Physics at Manchester University in 1983 and dean of science at Manchester in 1989. Irvine was Vice-Chancellor of the University of Aberdeen from 1991 to 1996. He was Vice-Chancellor of Birmingham University from 1996 to 2001. Irvine served as chairman of the nuclear physics committee of the Science Research Council and vice-president of the Institute of Physics. He was a director of the Public Health Laboratory Service. During the 1997 general election campaign, while he was Vice-Chancellor of Birmingham University, Irvine introduced Tony Blair before his keynote "education, education, education" speech. However three years later Irvine published an open letter to Prime Minister Blair, criticising the government's policies towards universities.

== Personal life ==
Irvine married Grace Ritchie in 1962 and had a son. His hobby was hill-walking.

Academic offices
Preceded by Sir Michael Thompson	Vice-Chancellor of the University of Birmingham; 1996–2001	Succeeded by Sir Michael Sterling
Preceded by George Paul McNicol	Principal and Vice-Chancellor of the University of Aberdeen; 1991–1996	Succeeded by Sir Duncan Rice
