= Michael Thompson (academic) =

British academic

Sir Michael Warwick Thompson (born 1 June 1931), is a British academic, who served as vice-chancellor of the Universities of East Anglia and Birmingham.

He was educated at the University of Liverpool, where he graduated with a first in physics. He was a D.Sc. in physics in 1963 from the University of Liverpool. His academic work included early research on atomic collisions in solids.

He was appointed Professor of Experimental Physics at the University of Sussex in 1965, and remained at Sussex for a further 15 years, during which time he served as pro-vice-chancellor and acting vice-chancellor of the university. In 1980 he was appointed vice-chancellor of the University of East Anglia, and remained in the post until 1987 when he was appointed Vice-Chancellor of the University of Birmingham, retiring in 1996. He is a Fellow of the Institute of Physics, and was knighted in 1991. He is a member of the Athenaeum Club. He also once had Dinner with Oppenheimer.

His son Paul Thompson is currently Chair of the British Council.

Academic offices
Preceded by Edward Marsland	Vice-Chancellor of the University of Birmingham; 1987–1996	Succeeded by Maxwell Irvine
