= Robert Hunter, Baron Hunter of Newington =

British physician and university administrator (1915–1994)

Robert Brockie Hunter, Baron Hunter of Newington MBE DL FRSE (14 July 1915 – 24 March 1994) was a British physician and university administrator. He was the personal physician to Field Marshal Montgomery, during the World War II in North-west Europe from 1944 to 1945.

== Life ==
He was born on 14 July 1915 the son of Margaret Thorburn (née Brockie) and Robert Marshall Hunter. He was educated at George Watson's College in Edinburgh, then studied medicine at the University of Edinburgh, graduating MB ChB in 1938. In the Second World War, he served in the Royal Army Medical Corps, and was later appointed as personal physician to Field Marshal Montgomery. He was demobilised with the rank of major, and returned to Edinburgh to work under Derrick Dunlop.

From 1947 to 1948, he was lecturer in therapeutics, at the University of Edinburgh, and in 1948 was lecturer in clinical medicine at St Andrews University. In 1948, he was elected a member of the Harveian Society of Edinburgh. He was professor of materia medica, pharmacology and therapeutics from 1948 to 1967, and was also dean of the Faculty of Medicine from 1958 to 1962. In 1963, he became a member of the Ministry of Health Committee on Safety of Drugs, serving until 1968. In academia, he moved to the University of Dundee in 1967, serving as professor of materia medica, pharmacology and therapeutics from 1967 to 1968. He was then appointed vice-chancellor of the University of Birmingham in 1968, a post he held until 1981. From 1973 to 1980, he was a member of the DHSS Independent Scientific Committee on Smoking and Health.

Following the revelations in 1962 of the thalidomide disaster of the three previous years, Hunter was appointed to the Committee on the Safety of Drugs, and was chairman of the Clinical Trials Sub-Committee.

In 1964, he was elected a Fellow of the Royal Society of Edinburgh. His proposers were Anthony Elliot Ritchie, George Howard Bell, Ernest Geoffrey Cullwick and James Macdonald.

Following his peerage in 1978, he was an active participant in the House of Lords and was a vocal supporter of the National Health Service.

He died of a heart attack while in his garden in Birmingham on 24 March 1994, aged 78.

== Honours and Arms ==
- 11 October 1945 – appointed a Member of the Order of the British Empire (MBE)
- 1 November 1977 – knighted
- 17 July 1978 – created a life peer as Baron Hunter of Newington, of Newington in the District of the City of Edinburgh

Coat of arms of Robert Hunter, Baron Hunter of Newington

Crest
A Peregrine Falcon with wings expanded proper
Escutcheon
Vert two Greyhounds courant in pale Argent collared of the first on a Chief Or a Book expanded proper binding and fore-edges Gules between two Hunting Horns of the first stringed of the Fourth
Supporters
On either side a Bay Stallion Hunter proper

== Family ==
In 1940, he married Kathleen Margaret Douglas with whom he had three sons and one daughter.

Academic offices
| Preceded by Robert Aitken | Vice-Chancellor of the University of Birmingham; 1968–1981 | Succeeded by Edward Marsland |
