= Michael Sterling =

British professor

Sir Michael John Howard Sterling FREng (born 9 February 1946) is a British engineer and a former Vice-Chancellor of the Brunel University (1990 to 2001) and the University of Birmingham (2001 to 2009).

== Early life ==
In 1964, Sterling joined Associated Electrical Industries (later General Electric Company plc) as a student apprentice. He was awarded a scholarship to the University of Sheffield to read electronic and electrical engineering. He graduated with a 1st class honours degree and subsequently a PhD degree in computer control in 1971.

== Academic career ==
He joined the Department of Control Engineering at the University of Sheffield as a lecturer and was promoted to senior lecturer in 1978. He then moved to the University of Durham as a professor of engineering in 1980, before being appointed as Vice-Chancellor of Brunel University in 1990. He was appointed a Fellow of the Royal Academy of Engineering in 1991. He was Vice-Chancellor of the University of Birmingham from October 2001 to April 2009. In July 2009 he was appointed chair of the Science and Technology Facilities Council, the agency responsible for funding big science in the United Kingdom.

He was chairman of the Russell Group, representing the United Kingdom's twenty leading research-intensive universities at a crucial time in higher education history, when the white paper on tuition fees was being debated and subsequently passed. He was also a board member of the Universities and Colleges Admissions Service (UCAS), a board member of Advantage West Midlands (the regional RDA), a member of AWM's Innovation and Technology Council and chair of AWM's Information and Communication Technology Steering Group. In addition he is a member of the Prime Minister's Council for Science and Technology and chairman of its energy sub-group.

At Brunel, Sterling oversaw the consolidation of the university and a merger with the West London Institute of Higher Education, which produced a multi-site university with a student body of 12,000. More controversially, he closed the Departments of Physics and Chemistry, and oversaw the award of an honorary doctorate to Dame Margaret Thatcher, against strong union and student resistance.

On his appointment to Birmingham, Sterling said that he was 'looking forward immensely to the challenge of leading the University of Birmingham into its 2nd century. It is a great international university which has not forgotten its local roots. There is huge potential in the university, the City of Birmingham and the West Midlands region'. In addition, he said that he relished 'the opportunity of working with new colleagues to achieve our common purpose of maintaining and improving Birmingham's position in the front rank of universities'.

During his time at Birmingham, Sterling was at the forefront of estates developments, creating a new skyline for the campus which includes the Institute for Biomedical Research, the Business School, the Sport and Exercise Sciences building and new halls of residence including Mason Hall and the Shackleton hub. The building stock was significantly improved and the old Muirhead Tower redesigned.

Having an engineering background, two initiatives that Sterling secured for Birmingham are the HEFCE-funded National Higher Education STEM Programme, to increase the number of graduates with skills in science, technology, engineering and maths disciplines to fulfill the needs of employers and boost the UK economy, and establishing the Energy Technologies Institute alongside Nottingham and Loughborough Universities.

Sterling retired in April 2009, following more than 19 years as a Vice-Chancellor, eight of those at Birmingham. His last major act as Vice-Chancellor was to bequeath a restructuring of the university on his successor, David Eastwood.

== Honours ==
Sterling was knighted in the 2012 Birthday Honours for services to higher education, science and engineering.

Academic offices
Preceded by Maxwell Irvine	Vice-Chancellor of the University of Birmingham; 2001–2009	Succeeded by David Eastwood
