= David Eastwood =

British academic and university vice-chancellor (born 1959)

Sir David Stephen Eastwood, DL, FRHistS (born 5 January 1959), is a British academic and long serving university leader who was Vice-Chancellor of the University of East Anglia (2002-2006) and of the University of Birmingham (April 2009 to December 2021).

== Early life ==
Eastwood was born on 5 January 1959 in Oldham, Lancashire, and educated at Sandbach School. In 1980, he graduated from St Peter's College, Oxford, with a First Class Bachelor of Arts (BA) degree in Modern History, and was promoted to Master of Arts (MA) in 1985. He completed his Doctor of Philosophy (DPhil) in 1985, also from the University of Oxford.

== Career ==
Eastwood has held the posts of Chief Executive of the Arts and Humanities Research Board and Pro-Vice-Chancellor of Swansea University. His academic specialism is modern history, and he was fellow and senior tutor of Pembroke College, Oxford.

He was Chief Executive of the Higher Education Funding Council for England (HEFCE), a post he had held since September 2006. His former posts also include Vice-Chancellor of the University of East Anglia and Chief Executive of the Arts and Humanities Research Board.

On 13 April 2009, he succeeded Michael Sterling as Vice-Chancellor of the University of Birmingham. In March 2011, Eastwood announced plans to raise the undergraduate tuition fees at the University of Birmingham to the maximum of £9,000 (subject to OFFA approval) for courses commencing 2012–13. Eastwood retired from the position in December 2021 and was succeeded by Adam Tickell.

Eastwood is a former chair of the QAA Steering Group for Benchmarking and a former member of the QAA Board. He has contributed numerous times to several newspapers, among them The Guardian, The Sunday Telegraph and The Times. His specialist subject is 18th and 19th century British and American politics.

He has been a member of the board of the Universities Superannuation Scheme since 2007.

== Honours ==
Eastwood was elected a Fellow of the Royal Historical Society (FRHistS) in 1991. On 25 January 2012, he was appointed a Deputy Lieutenant of the West Midlands. He was knighted in the 2014 Birthday Honours for services to higher education.

Academic offices
Preceded by Vincent Watts	Vice-Chancellor of the University of East Anglia; 2002–2006	Succeeded by Bill MacMillan
Preceded by Michael Sterling	Vice-Chancellor of the University of Birmingham; 2009–2021	Succeeded by Adam Tickell
