= Koettlitz =

Koettlitz can refer to:

- Reginald Koettlitz (1860–1916), British physician and polar explorer
  - Koettlitz Glacier, a glacier named after him in Antarctica
  - Koettlitz Névé, a névé named after him in Antarctica
