= Susan Solomon =

American atmospheric chemist

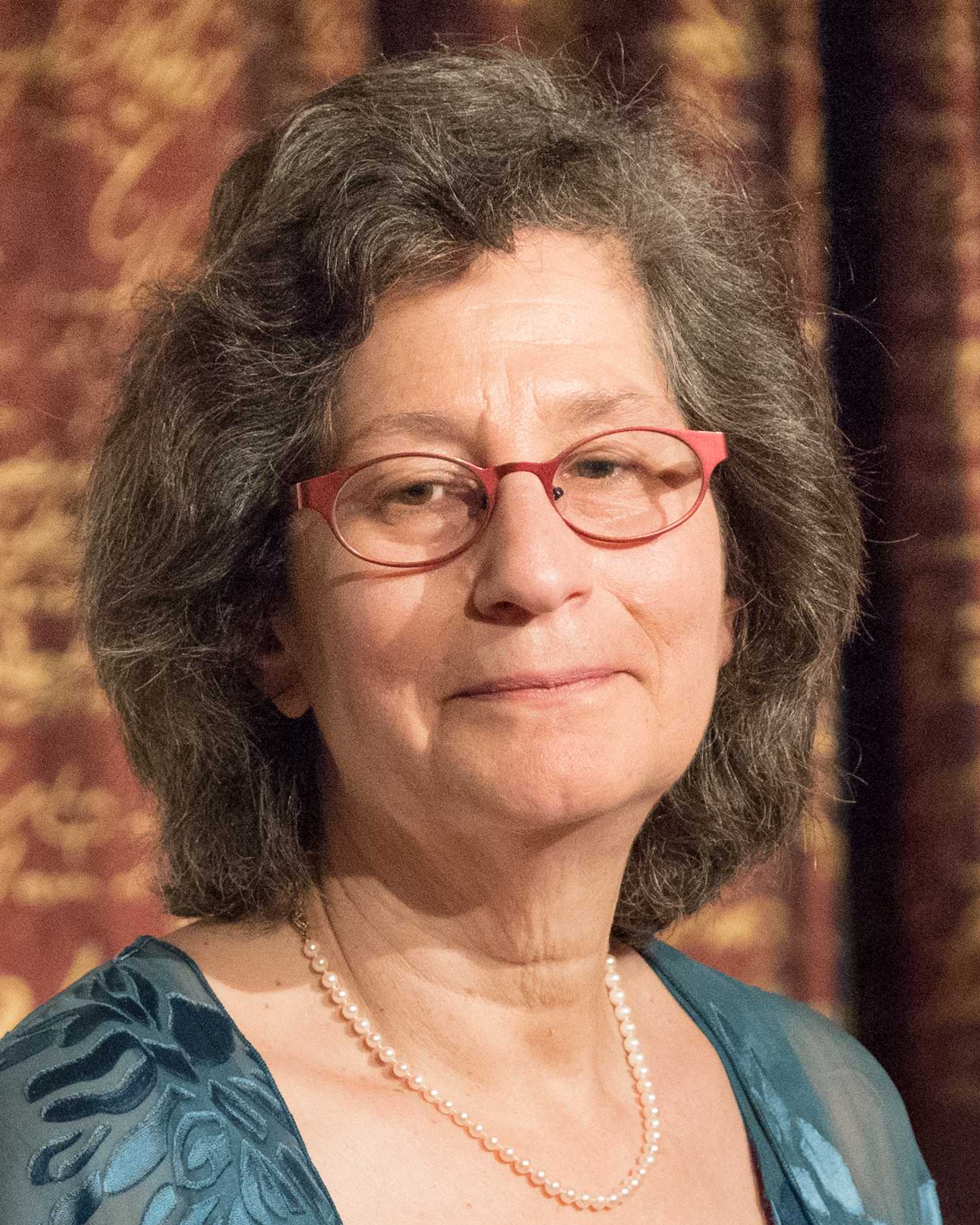
- Solomon in 2018
- Born: 1956 (age 69–70); Chicago, Illinois, U.S.
- Education: Illinois Institute of Technology (BS); University of California, Berkeley (MS, PhD)
- Known for: Ozone Studies
- Awards: National Medal of Science (1999); V. M. Goldschmidt Award (2006); William Bowie Medal (2007); Volvo Environment Prize (2009); Vetlesen Prize (2012); BBVA Foundation Frontiers of Knowledge Award (2012); Crafoord Prize (2018); Tang Prize (2026)
- Scientific career
- Fields: Atmospheric chemistry
- Workplaces: Massachusetts Institute of Technology

Susan Solomon (born 1956) is an American atmospheric chemist, working for most of her career at the National Oceanic and Atmospheric Administration (NOAA). In 2011, Solomon joined the faculty at the Massachusetts Institute of Technology, where she serves as the Ellen Swallow Richards Professor of Atmospheric Chemistry & Climate Science. Solomon, with her colleagues, was the first to propose the chlorofluorocarbon free radical reaction mechanism that is the cause of the Antarctic ozone hole. Her most recent book, Solvable: how we healed the earth, and how we can do it again (2024) focuses on solutions to current problems, as do books by data scientist Hannah Ritchie, marine biologist, Ayana Elizabeth Johnson and climate scientist Katharine Hayhoe.

Solomon is a member of the U.S. National Academy of Sciences, the European Academy of Sciences, and the French Academy of Sciences. In 2002, Discover magazine recognized her as one of the 50 most important women in science. In 2008, Solomon was selected by Time magazine as one of the 100 most influential people in the world. She also serves on the Science and Security Board for the Bulletin of the Atomic Scientists.

== Biography ==
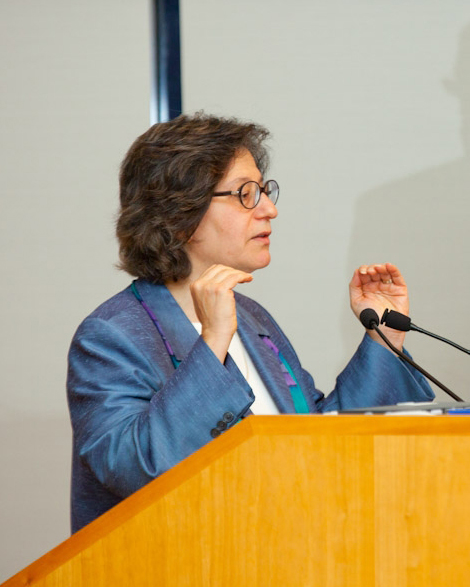
Susan Solomon, 2010

=== Early life ===
Solomon was born in Chicago, Illinois. Her interest in science began as a child watching The Undersea World of Jacques Cousteau. In high school she placed third in a national science competition, with a project that measured the percentage of oxygen in a gas mixture.

Solomon received a B.S. degree in chemistry from the Illinois Institute of Technology in 1977. She then received an M.S. in chemistry in 1979 followed by a Ph.D. in 1981 in atmospheric chemistry, both from the University of California, Berkeley.

=== Personal life ===
Solomon married Barry Sidwell in 1988. She is Jewish.

=== Work ===
Solomon was the head of the Chemistry and Climate Processes Group of the National Oceanic and Atmospheric Administration Chemical Sciences Division until 2011. In 2011, she joined the faculty of the Department of Earth, Atmospheric and Planetary Sciences at the Massachusetts Institute of Technology.

==== Books ====
- The Coldest March: Scott's Fatal Antarctic Expedition, Yale University Press, 2002 ISBN 0-300-09921-5 – Depicts the tale of Captain Robert Falcon Scott's failed 1912 Antarctic expedition, specifically applying the comparison of modern meteorological data with that recorded by Scott's expedition in an attempt to shed new light on the reasons for the demise of Scott's polar party.
- Aeronomy of the Middle Atmosphere: Chemistry and Physics of the Stratosphere and Mesosphere, 3rd Edition, Springer, 2005 ISBN 1-4020-3284-6 – Describes the atmospheric chemistry and physics of the middle atmosphere from 10 to 100 kilometres (6.2 to 62.1 mi) altitude.
- Solomon, Susan (2024). Solvable: how we healed the earth, and how we can do it again. Chicago; London: The University of Chicago Press. ISBN 9780226827933.

==== The Ozone Hole ====
Solomon, working with colleagues at the NOAA Earth System Research Laboratories, postulated the mechanism that the Antarctic ozone hole was created by a heterogeneous reaction of ozone and chlorofluorocarbons free radicals on the surface of ice particles in the high altitude clouds that form over Antarctica. In 1986 and 1987 Solomon led the National Ozone Expedition to McMurdo Sound, where the team gathered the evidence to confirm the accelerated reactions. Solomon was the solo leader of the expedition, and the only woman on the team. Her team measured levels of chlorine oxide 100 times higher than expected in the atmosphere, which had been released by the decomposition of chlorofluorocarbons by ultraviolet radiation.

Solomon later showed that volcanoes could accelerate the reactions caused by chlorofluorocarbons, and so increase the damage to the ozone layer. Her work formed the basis of the U.N. Montreal Protocol, an international agreement to protect the ozone layer by regulating damaging chemicals. Solomon has also presented some research which suggests that implementation of the Montreal Protocols is having a positive effect.

For her critical contribution to saving the ozone layer, Solomon was a winner of the 2021 Future of Life Award along with Joe Farman and Stephen O. Andersen. Jim Hansen, former Director of the NASA Goddard Institute for Space Studies and Director of Columbia University's Program on Climate Science, Awareness and Solutions said, "In Farman, Solomon and Andersen we see the tremendous impact individuals can have not only on the course of human history, but on the course of our planet's history. My hope is that others like them will emerge in today's battle against climate change." Professor Guus Velders, a climate scientist at Utrecht University said, "Susan Solomon is a deserving recipient of the Future of Life Award. Susan not only explained the processes behind the formation of the ozone hole, she also played an active role as an interface between the science and policy of the Montreal Protocol."

==== The Coldest March ====
Using research work conducted by English explorer and navy officer Robert Falcon Scott, Solomon also wrote and spoke about Scott's 1911 expedition in The Coldest March: Scott's Fatal Antarctic Expedition to counter a longstanding argument that blamed Scott for his and his crew's demise during that expedition. Scott attributed his death to unforeseen weather conditions – a claim that has been contested by British journalist and author Roland Huntford. Huntford claimed that Scott was a prideful and under-prepared leader. Solomon has defended Scott and said that "modern data side squarely with Scott", describing the weather conditions in 1911 as unusual.

==== Intergovernmental Panel on Climate Change ====
Solomon served on the Intergovernmental Panel on Climate Change. She was a contributing author for the Third Assessment Report. She was also co-chair of Working Group I for the Fourth Assessment Report.

== Awards ==
- 1991 – Henry G. Houghton Award for research in physical meteorology, awarded by the American Meteorological Society
- 1994 – Solomon Saddle (78°23′S 162°39′E), a snow saddle at about 1,850 metres (6,070 ft) elevation, named in her honor
- 1994 – Solomon Glacier (78°23′S 162°30′E), an Antarctic glacier named in her honor
- 1999 – National Medal of Science, awarded by the President of the United States
- 2000 – Carl-Gustaf Rossby Research Medal, awarded by the American Meteorological Society
- 2004 – Blue Planet Prize, awarded by the Asahi Glass Foundation
- 2006 – V. M. Goldschmidt Award
- 2006 – Inducted into the Colorado Women's Hall of Fame
- 2007 – William Bowie Medal, awarded by the American Geophysical Union
- 2007 — Prix Georges Lemaître
- 2007 – As a member of IPCC, which received half of the Nobel Peace Prize in 2007, she shared a stage receiving the prize with Al Gore (who received the other half).
- 2008 – Grande Médaille (Great Medal) of the French Academy of Sciences
- 2008 – Foreign Member of the Royal Society
- 2008 – Member of the American Philosophical Society
- 2009 – Volvo Environment Prize, awarded by the Royal Swedish Academy of Sciences
- 2009 – Inducted into the National Women's Hall of Fame
- 2010 – Service to America Medal, awarded by the Partnership for Public Service
- 2010 – Knight of the Legion of Honor (Chevalier de la Légion d’honneur), awarded by the French government
- 2012 – Vetlesen Prize, for work on the ozone hole, shared with Jean Jouzel. She was the first woman to receive this prize.
- 2013 – BBVA Foundation Frontiers of Knowledge Award in the Climate Change category
- 2015 – Honorary Doctorate (honoris causa) from Brown University.
- 2017 – Arthur L. Day Prize and Lectureship by the National Academy of Sciences for substantive work in atmospheric chemistry and climate change
- 2018 – Bakerian Lecture
- 2018 – Crafoord Prize in Geosciences
- 2019 – Made one of the members of the inaugural class of the Government Hall of Fame
- 2021 – On 31 July she was appointed as ordinary Member of the Pontifical Academy of Sciences
- 2021 – 2021 Future of Life Award (Ozone Layer)
- 2021 – NAS Award for Chemistry in Service to Society
- 2023 – Honorary Doctorate from Duke University
- 2023 – Female Innovator Prize from the VinFuture Foundation
- 2026 – Tang Prize in the category of "Sustainable Development".
