= Mount Dromedary (Antarctica) =

Mountain in Ross Dependency, Antarctica

- Location within Antarctica

Highest point
- Coordinates: 78°19′S 163°02′E

Geography
- Location: Victoria Land, Antarctica
- Parent range: Royal Society Range

Mount Dromedary (78°19′S 163°02′E) is a hump-shaped mountain, over 2,400 metres (7,900 ft) high, standing 4 nautical miles (7.4 km; 4.6 mi) east of Mount Kempe in the Royal Society Range of Victoria Land, Antarctica. First mapped by the BrNAE, 1901–04, but named by the BrAE, 1910–13. Named for the appearance of the mountain which resembles a dromedary's hump.

== Location ==
Mount Dromedary is in the southeast of the Royal Society Range. The Pyramid, the southeast tip of the range, is to the southeast. The head of Renegar Glacier, a tributary of the Koettlitz Glacier, is to the south. Mount Kempe is to the east, connected to Mount Dromedary by a ridge that runs along the south side of the Kempe Glacier. Features to the north and east include Dismal Ridge, Glee Glacier, Roaring Valley, Lake Porkchop, Penny Lake, The Amphitheatre and Dromedary Glacier. In 1961, Dr. Bruno W. Wahl and a colleague Mr. Collins became the first to scale Mt. Dromedary.

== Western features ==
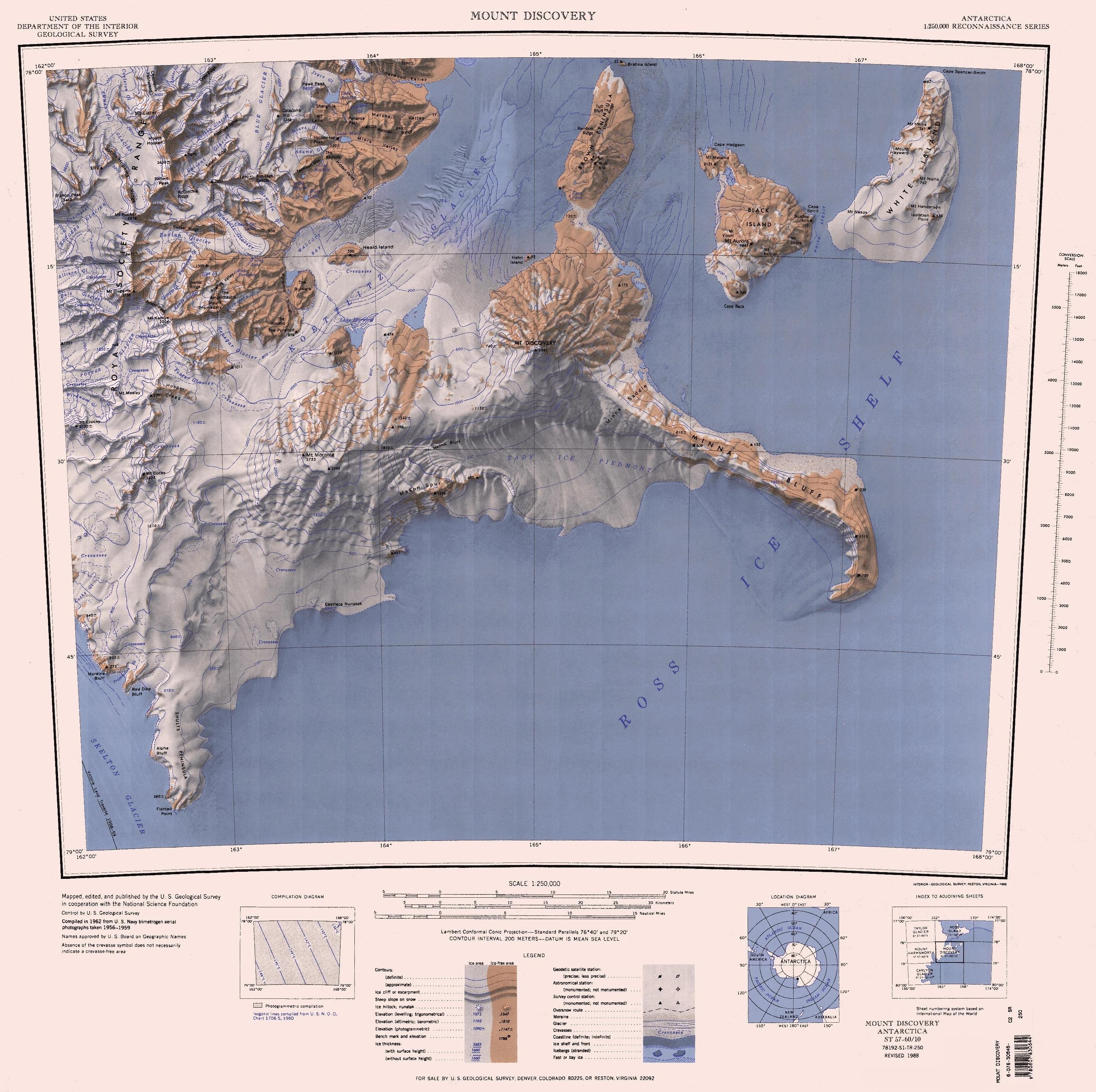
Mount Dromedary in northwest of map

Nearby features to the west of Mount Dromedary include:

=== Mount Kempe ===
78°19′S 162°43′E. A peak, 3,005 metres (9,859 ft) high, midway between Mounts Muggins and Dromedary. Discovered by the British National Antarctic Expedition (BrNAE; 1901–04) which named it for Sir Alfred Bray Kempe, at that time Treasurer of the Royal Society.

=== Inan Peak ===
78.3333333°S 162.6333333°E A peak rising to 2,451 metres (8,041 ft) high, 1.15 nautical miles (2.13 km; 1.32 mi) west of Mount Kempe. Named by the United States Advisory Committee on Antarctic Names (US-ACAN) (1994) after Umran S. Inan, Stanford University, who conducted critical research from 1980 in the upper atmosphere of Antarctica at Siple Station and Palmer Station; internationally recognized as a leader in the study of upper atmospheric phenomena.

=== Auster Pass ===
78°18′S 162°38′E. A high pass between Mount Huggins and Mount Kempe, leading into the Skelton Glacier area from McMurdo Sound. Named by the New Zealand Northern Survey Party of the Commonwealth Trans-Antarctic Expedition (CTAE) (1956-58) for the RNZAF Antarctic Flight's Auster aircraft.

=== Kempe Glacier ===
78°18′S 162°54′E. A short alpine glacier, bounded on the north by Dismal Ridge and on the south by the Mount Kempe-Mount Dromedary ridge, whose chief nourishment is névé fields on the north slopes of Mount Kempe. The glacier drains northeast toward Roaring Valley. Named by the New Zealand Victoria University of Wellington Antarctic Expedition (VUWAE), 1960-61, for its association with Mount Kempe.

=== Mount Stearns ===
78.3166667°S 162.8166667°E A mountain rising to 2,670 metres (8,760 ft) high on the divide between the head of Kempe Glacier and Renegar Glacier. The mountain stands 1.3 nautical miles (2.4 km; 1.5 mi) east of Mount Kempe. Named by US-ACAN (1994) after Charles R. Stearns, Department of Meteorology, University of Wisconsin, who designed and positioned automated weather stations in Antarctica over many seasons, 1990-2006.

== Eastern features ==
=== Dismal Ridge ===
78°17′S 162°48′E. A forked ridge leading north and east from the Mount Kempe–Mount Muggins saddle. It is bounded on the north and west by the Radian Glacier and Glimpse Glacier, and on the south by Kempe Glacier. The two forks enclose the Glee Glacier and descend to Roaring Valley. The ridge was so named by the VUWAE, 1960-61, because of the persistently dismal weather conditions encountered while they were mapping in January 1961, and also because of difficulties encountered in establishing a high food camp on this ridge by helicopter, again owing to the weather.

=== Glee Glacier ===
78°16′S 163°00′E. A small glacier enclosed by the two arms of Dismal Ridge, flowing eastward to Roaring Valley. It was given this name because of the feeling inspired by occasional sightings of the glacier made through the mists of Dismal Ridge, as it afforded a means of orientation in conditions of otherwise blind navigation. Named by the New Zealand VUWAE, 1960-61.

=== Roaring Valley ===
78°16′S 163°03′E. A moraine-filled valley on the north side of Mount Dromedary, formerly occupied by the coalescing glaciers that descend northeast and north from Mount Kempe and Mount Dromedary. The New Zealand VUWAE, 1960-61, which named this feature, experienced strong winds at most campsites in this area, but none of such violence and destructive force as those which struck their camp at the mouth of this valley, hence the name.

=== Lake Porkchop ===
78°16′S 163°08′E. A lake near the middle of Roaring Valley, having the shape similar to that of a pork chop. Given this descriptive name by the New Zealand VUWAE, 1960-61.

=== Penny Lake ===
78°16′S 163°12′E. A coin-shaped lake perched in moraine near the mouth of Roaring Valley, just south of Walcott Glacier. It was the site of a base camp of the VUWAE, 1960-61, which gave this descriptive name.

=== The Amphitheatre ===
78°18′S 163°03′E. A great cirque, now occupied only by névé, carved on the north side of Mount Dromedary, whose walls rise sheer about 1,700 metres (5,600 ft) high from the floor of Roaring Valley. So named by the New Zealand VUWAE, 1960-61, because of the feature's enormous size and near-perfect shape.

=== Amphitheatre Glacier ===
78.2833333°S 163.0666667°E. A moraine-covered glacier that flows north from The Amphitheatre into Roaring Valley. Named by a NZGS field party in the area, 1977–78, in association with The Amphitheatre.

== Sources ==
- Alberts, Fred G., ed. (1995), Geographic Names of the Antarctic (PDF) (2 ed.), United States Board on Geographic Names This article incorporates public domain material from websites or documents of the United States Board on Geographic Names.
- "Amphitheatre Glacier", Geographic Names Information System, United States Geological Survey, United States Department of the Interior
- "Inan Peak", Geographic Names Information System, United States Geological Survey, United States Department of the Interior
- Mount Discovery, USGS: United States Geological Survey
- "Mount Stearns", Geographic Names Information System, United States Geological Survey, United States Department of the Interior

This article incorporates public domain material from websites or documents of the United States Geological Survey.
