= Mount Schwerdtfeger =

Mountain in Ross Dependency, Antarctica

- Location within Antarctica

Highest point
- Coordinates: 78.35°S 162.7666667°E

Geography
- Location: Victoria Land, Antarctica
- Parent range: Royal Society Range

Mount Schwerdtfeger (78.35°S 162.7666667°E) is a peak, 2,950 metres (9,680 ft) high on the ridge at the head of Renegar Glacier, 1.75 nautical miles (3.24 km; 2.01 mi) south of Mount Kempe in the Royal Society Range, Victoria Land, Antarctica.

== Name ==
Mount Schwerdtfeger was named by the United States Advisory Committee on Antarctic Names (US-ACAN) (1994) after Werner Schwerdtfeger, senior meteorological researcher, University of Wisconsin, a driving force in the study of Antarctic meteorology. His specialty was the study of the barrier winds east of the Antarctic Peninsula.

== Nearby features ==
=== Fisher Bastion ===
78°21′S 162°31′E. A high rectangular massif 2,650 metres (8,690 ft) high between the upper reaches of Potter Glacier and Foster Glacier, 4.5 nautical miles (8.3 km; 5.2 mi) southeast of Mount Huggins. Named by US-ACAN in 1994 after Commander Dwight David Fisher (Fisher Peak, q.v.), United States Navy Commanding Officer of NSFA, 1987-89.

=== Mount Duvall ===
78.3666667°S 162.5166667°E An ice-covered mountain, 2,149 metres (7,051 ft) high, standing close west of Fisher Bastion on the north side of Solomon Glacier. Named byUS-ACAN (1994) after Thomas L. Duvall, Jr., who conducted research, along with John W. Harvey and Martin Pomerantz, in helioseismology at the South Pole Station from 1980.

=== Solomon Glacier ===
78°23′S 162°30′E. A glacier on the south side of Fisher Bastion which flows west from Solomon Saddle to enter Potter Glacier. Named by US-ACAN in 1994 after Susan Solomon, NOAA, atmospheric chemist who has been a leader in the study of upper atmospheric physics in Antarctica. At the time of naming, Chairman of the Office of Polar Programs Advisory Committee, NSF.

=== Solomon Saddle ===
78°23′S 162°39′E. A snow saddle, about 1,850 metres (6,070 ft) high, located between the heads of Solomon Glacier and Foster Glacier, to the south of Fisher Bastion. Named by US-ACAN in 1994 in association with Solomon Glacier.

=== Upper Jaw Glacier ===
78.35°S 162.95°E. A small tributary glacier that flows east and converges with Lower Jaw Glacier before entering Renegar Glacier. Named by the New Zealand Geographic Board (NZGB) in 1994. On a map, the combined shapes of the Upper Jaw Glacier and Lower Jaw Glacier resemble a gaping mouth, an illusion strengthened by the proximity of Shark Fin.

=== Lower Jaw Glacier ===
78.3666667°S 162.95°E The south branch of the glacier on the eastern side of the ridge running north from Shark Fin. The branch flows eastward and converges with Upper Jaw Glacier before entering Renegar Glacier. Named by the NZGB, 1994.

=== Shark Fin ===
78.3666667°S 162.9166667°E. Description: A sharp peak, 2,242 metres (7,356 ft) high, at the eastern end of the ridge separating the heads of Renegar Glacier and Foster Glacier. Named by NZGB, 1994, following work in the area by a NZGS geological party, 1977-78, led by D.N.B. Skinner. The peak has the triangular shape of a shark fin when viewed from the south.

=== Shark Fin Glacier ===
78.3833333°S 162.9166667°E A small hanging glacier between the heads of Renegar Glacier and Foster Glacier and to the south of Shark Fin. Named by NZGB in 1994 in association with Shark Fin.

=== Highway Ridge ===
78.3833333°S 162.9666667°E. A ridge extending eastward from Shark Fin Glacier to Foster Glacier. Named by New Zealand Geographic Board (NZGB) (1994) following work in the area by a NZGS field party, 1977-78. The name alludes to the excellent access that the ridge provides from the lower part of Foster Glacier to Shark Fin Glacier.

== Sources ==
- Alberts, Fred G., ed. (1995), Geographic Names of the Antarctic (PDF) (2 ed.), United States Board on Geographic Names This article incorporates public domain material from websites or documents of the United States Board on Geographic Names.
- "Highway Ridge", Geographic Names Information System, United States Geological Survey, United States Department of the Interior
- "Lower Jaw Glacier", Geographic Names Information System, United States Geological Survey, United States Department of the Interior
- "Mount Duvall", Geographic Names Information System, United States Geological Survey, United States Department of the Interior
- "Mount Schwerdtfeger", Geographic Names Information System, United States Geological Survey, United States Department of the Interior
- "Shark Fin", Geographic Names Information System, United States Geological Survey, United States Department of the Interior
- "Shark Fin Glacier", Geographic Names Information System, United States Geological Survey, United States Department of the Interior
- "Upper Jaw Glacier", Geographic Names Information System, United States Geological Survey, United States Department of the Interior

This article incorporates public domain material from websites or documents of the United States Geological Survey.
