= Camp II Point =

Camp II Point (78°23′00″S 163°10′00″E) is a point of ice-cored moraine that extends east into Koettlitz Glacier at the south side of lower Renegar Glacier. So named by the New Zealand Geographic Board in 1994 because the second camp of a NZGS field party led by D. N. B. Skinner, 1977–78, was made on the moraine.
