= Mount Rees =

Mount Rees can refer to:

- Mount Rees (Victoria Land)
- Mount Rees (Marie Byrd Land)
