= Richard Brooke (explorer) =

British explorer (1927–2020)

Richard "Brookes" Brooke (14 January 1927 – 29 June 2020) was an explorer and Royal Naval surveyor whose achievements included spending two winters on the British North‑East Greenland Expedition (1952–1954) and participating in Commonwealth Trans-Antarctic Expedition (TAE) (1956–1958). During the TAE he became the first person to ascend a peak (Mount Huggins) in the Royal Society Range and walked the 1600 km between Mawson Glacier and Mulock Glacier.

He was also a licensed lay reader in the Church of England in Bath, Somerset.

He died on 29 June 2020 at the age of 93.
