= Mount Talmadge =

Mountain in Antarctica

Mount Talmadge (78°25′S 162°34′E) is a mountain (2,395 m) which rises above the steep cliffs at the west side of Koettlitz Neve, 3 nautical miles (6 km) south of Fisher Bastion, Victoria Land. Named by Advisory Committee on Antarctic Names (US-ACAN) in 1994 after John B. Talmadge, Head of Polar Coordination and Information Section (1984–95), Office of Polar Programs, National Science Foundation (NSF).
