= Julia Uberuaga =

American civilian contractor in Antarctica (b. 1955)

Julia Mary Uberuaga
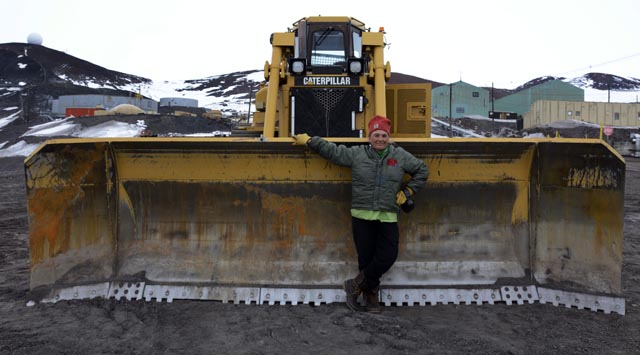
- Julia Uberuaga and D7, Trixie (2014)
- Born: February 26, 1955 (age 71); Boise, Idaho, U.S.
- Other name: Jules
- Occupation: Heavy equipment operator

Julia "Jules" Mary Uberuaga (born February 26, 1955) is an American civilian contractor for the National Science Foundation, based in Antarctica. At age 24, she became one of the first women working as a summer-over employee. Since then, Uberuaga has worked more than thirty seasons in Antarctica as a heavy equipment operator.

== Early life and education ==
Uberuaga lives in Garden City, Idaho. She is Basque and grew up speaking the Basque language in her large local Basque community. From a young age, she was engaged in manual labor, including summer jobs at the Emmett Sawmill. When she was 18, she moved to Moscow, Idaho to attend the University of Idaho.

== Career ==
Cover of 2016 report on snow road construction co-authored by Sally Shoop, Julia Uberuaga, Wendy Wieder, and Terry Melendy.

Uberuaga's first role was as a general field assistant at the South Pole Station where she was hired through Holmes & Narver Inc. Her duties included maintaining the airstrip, refueling the fuel tanks, and melting snow into water at Williams Field.

For her first two summers, Uberuaga was the only female civilian contractor at the South Pole Station and among the few women working there. She reported experiencing sexism in her first years, noting that the predominantly male workforce made her feel unwelcome. She detailed how she could not find a women's restroom and the challenges of pursuing a career traditionally held by men.

Uberuaga completed multiple consecutive summer deployments to Antarctica. For two seasons, she worked as a general field assistant at South Pole Station. Uberuaga received her first promotion during the 1997 season and became the first female heavy equipment operator on the continent. She spent most of her career in this role, operating a Caterpillar D7 Pearl named Trixie.

She was employed at several different locations: Siple Dome, Siple Station, Byrd Surface Camp, and most recently at the McMurdo Ice Shelf. In her time on the ice shelf, Uberuaga worked 15 seasons at Williams Field maintaining the skiway. Between 1979 and 1999, Uberuaga worked 20 consecutive seasons with various U.S. Antarctic Program (USAP) contractors. She was chosen as the station's honorary mayor in the station's 2004 mock election.

In 2012, she worked on a NASA weather research project that involved releasing helium balloons into the atmosphere. By 2015, Uberuaga held the record for being one of two people to work 35 consecutive summers in Antarctica.

In 2017, Uberuaga was featured in Season 9, Episode 5 of Anthony Bourdain: Parts Unknown highlighting her heavy equipment operator career on the continent. By the end of her final season in 2017, Uberuaga had made 38 consecutive deployments to the continent.

Uberuaga Island, Dailey Islands, Antarctica

== Uberuaga Island ==
On November 4, 1999, the New Zealand Antarctic Place-Names Committee (NZAPC) named an island located in the Dailey Islands after Uberuaga. Uberuaga Island is located at 77°53′S 165°17′E. The island has a weather station named Jules Station.
