= Steven Cummer =

American electrical engineer and academician

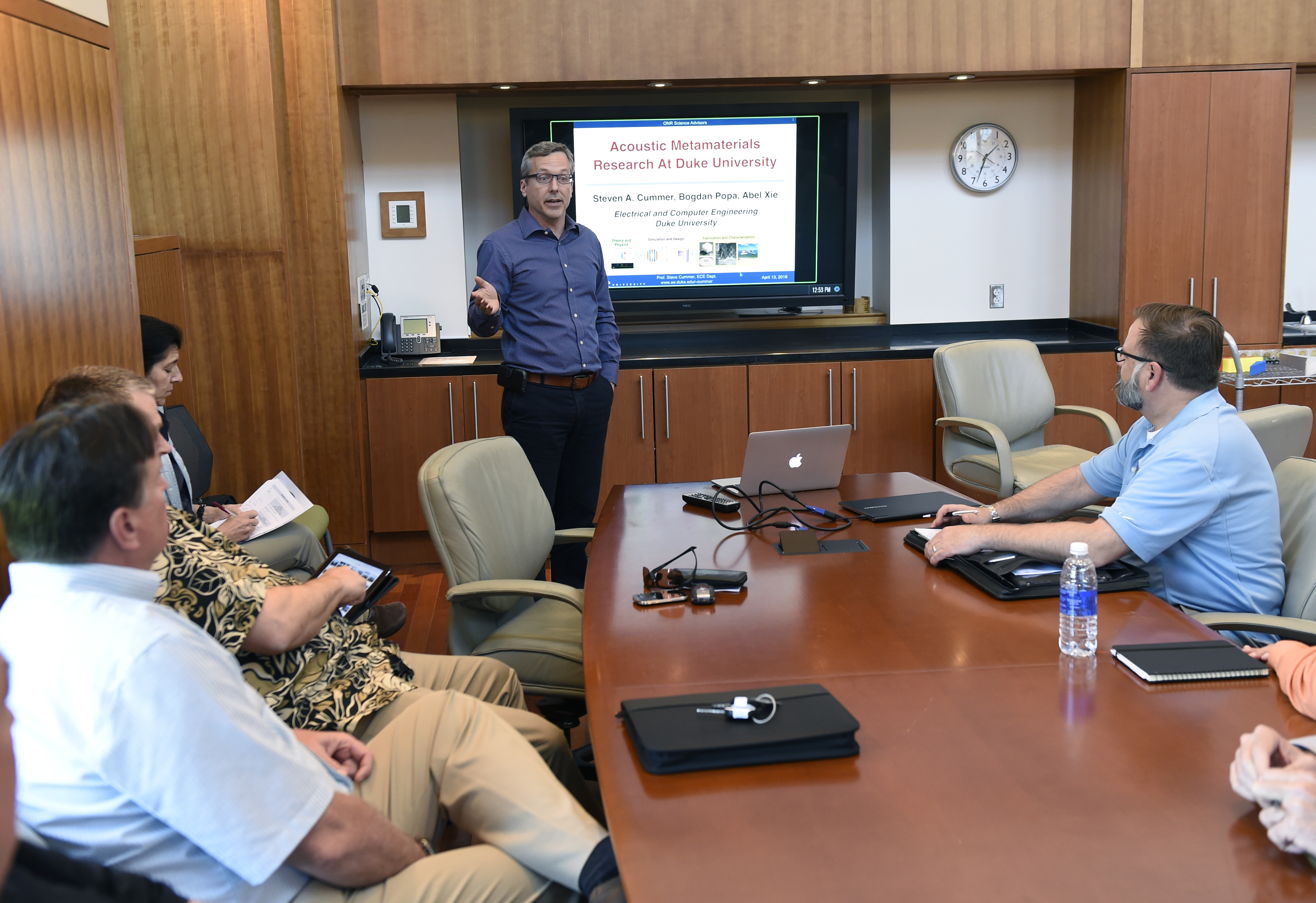
- Cummer in 2016
- Born: Steven Andrew Cummer
- Education: Stanford University
- Known for: Metamaterial cloaking; Acoustic metamaterials
- Awards: Presidential Early Career Award for Scientists and Engineers (2001)
- Scientific career
- Fields: Electrical engineering
- Institutions: Duke University; Goddard Space Flight Center
- Thesis: Lightning and ionospheric remote sensing using VLF/ELF radio atmospherics (1999)
- Doctoral advisor: Umran Inan
- Website: ee.duke.edu/~cummer

Steven Andrew Cummer is an American electrical engineer, geophysicist and academician, who is William H. Younger Distinguished Professor of Engineering at Duke University. He is best known for his work on metamaterials, geophysical remote sensing and lightning phenomena.

== Education and career ==
Cummer received bachelor's, master's and doctoral degrees in electrical engineering from Stanford University in 1991, 1993 and 1997, respectively. His graduate studies were conducted in the Stanford VLF Group. From 1997 to 1999, he served as a National Research Council postdoctoral research associate at NASA Goddard Space Flight Center. In 1999, he joined the faculty of Duke University.

== Research and awards ==
Cummer's research focuses on geophysical remote sensing, lightning phenomena, and electromagnetic and acoustic metamaterials. In 2006, his research group, in collaboration with David R. Smith and John Pendry, has built the first prototype of metamaterial cloaking device for microwaves using the theory of transformation optics. Having developed a theoretical recipe for designing such devices for sound waves in 2008, his research group experimentally demonstrated the two-dimensional acoustic metamaterial cloaking in 2011. Cummer's research group further extended their design to cloak objects for incident waves in arbitrary directions in 2014. His other work involves the study of gigantic jets and terrestrial gamma-ray flashes.

In 2001, he received Presidential Early Career Award for Scientists and Engineers, "for developing an innovative technique for remote sensing of the least-explored upper regions of the atmosphere, using electromagnetic radiation from lightning to determine this region's variability and its connections to other atmospheric regions and climate." In 2011, he was named as Fellow of the IEEE "for contributions to lightning remote sensing and artificial electromagnetic materials." In 2016, he was elected as a fellow of American Geophysical Union "for development and application of innovative radio techniques for remote measurement of lightning processes."

== Selected publications ==
Journal articles

- Cummer, Steven A. (September 2000). "Modeling electromagnetic propagation in the earth-ionosphere waveguide". IEEE Transactions on Antennas and Propagation. 48 (9): 1420–1429. doi:10.1109/8.898776.
- Schurig, D.; Mock, J. J.; Justice, B. J.; Cummer, S. A.; Pendry, J. B.; Starr, A. F.; Smith, D. R. (2006). "Metamaterial electromagnetic cloak at microwave frequencies". Science. 314 (5801): 977–980. Bibcode:2006Sci...314..977S. doi:10.1126/science.1133628. PMID 17053110. S2CID 8387554.
- Cummer, Steven A.; Schurig, David (March 2, 2007). "One path to acoustic cloaking". New Journal of Physics. 9 (3): 45. doi:10.1088/1367-2630/9/3/045.
- Cummer, Steven A.; Popa, Bogdan-Ioan; Schurig, David; Smith, David R.; Pendry, John; Rahm, Marco; Starr, Anthony (January 14, 2008). "Scattering theory derivation of a 3D acoustic cloaking shell". Physical Review Letters. 100 (2) 024301. doi:10.1103/PhysRevLett.100.024301.
- Popa, Bogdan-Ioan; Zigoneanu, Lucian; Cummer, Steven A. (2011). "Experimental acoustic ground cloak in air". Physical Review Letters. 106 (253901) 253901. doi:10.1103/PhysRevLett.106.253901. PMID 21770640.
- Dwyer, Joseph R.; Smith, David M.; Cummer, Steven A. (June 3, 2012). "High-energy atmospheric physics: Terrestrial gamma-ray flashes and related phenomena". Space Science Reviews. 173 (1–4): 133–196. doi:10.1007/s11214-012-9894-0.
- Zigoneanu, Lucian; Popa, Bogdan-Ioan; Cummer, Steven A. (March 9, 2014). "Three-dimensional broadband omnidirectional acoustic ground cloak". Nature Materials. 13 (4): 352–355. doi:10.1038/nmat3901. hdl:10161/8401. PMID 24608143.
- Xie, Yangbo; Wang, Wenqi; Chen, Huanyang; Konneker, Adam; Popa, Bogdan-Ioan; Cummer, Steven A. (November 24, 2014). "Wavefront modulation and subwavelength diffractive acoustics with an acoustic metasurface". Nature Communications. 5 5553. arXiv:1406.6306. doi:10.1038/ncomms6553. PMID 25418084.
- Cummer, Steven A.; Christensen, Johan; Alù, Andrea (February 16, 2016). "Controlling sound with acoustic metamaterials". Nature Reviews Materials. 1 (3) 16001. doi:10.1038/natrevmats.2016.1.

Patents

- US 7889127B2, Sajuyigbe, Soji; Smith, David R. & Cummer, Steven et al., "Wide angle impedance matching using metamaterials in a phased array antenna system", issued February 15, 2011
- US 11467536B2, Xie, Yangbo & Cummer, Steven, "Holographic acoustic imaging systems and devices based on a dynamic aperture and methods of use", issued November 11, 2022
