= Umran Inan =

Turkish scientist, academic and academician

Umran Savaş İnan
- Born: Umran Savaş İnan; December 28, 1950 (age 75); Erzincan, Turkey
- Education: METU (B.Sc., M.Sc.); Stanford University (Ph.D.)
- Known for: Inan Peak
- Awards: Allan V. Cox Medal of Stanford for Faculty Excellence in Fostering Undergraduate Research (2007); Mustafa Prize (2019)
- Scientific career
- Fields: Geosciences and VLF Electromagnetic radiation
- Workplaces: Koç University; Stanford University
- Doctoral advisor: Robert Helliwell
- Doctoral students: Steven Cummer

Umran Savaş İnan (Turkish: Umran Savaş İnan; born December 28, 1950) is a Turkish scientist at Koç University and Stanford University in the field of geophysics and very low frequency radio science. İnan was the president of Koç University between 2009 and 2021.

== Life and career ==
Inan received his B.Sc. and M.Sc. degrees in Electrical Engineering in 1972 and 1973 from the Middle East Technical University in Ankara, Türkiye. He conducted doctoral research during four years at Stanford University, receiving his Ph.D. in Electrical Engineerin in 1977, working under the tutelage of <Prof. Robert Helliwell. Inan later worked at Stanford as Acting Assistant Professor and Research Affiliate, and was appointed as Assistant Professor in the Department of Electrical Engineering in 1982. He subsequently was promoted to Associate Professor in 1985, receiving tenure in 1988, and promoted to full Professor in 1991.

In 1997, Inan was appointed Director of Space, Telecommunications & Radioscience Laboratory (STAR) at Stanford University and continued as an active faculty member therein until September 2009. During his 30+ year academic career, Inan worked in areas of geophysics, near-Earth Space Science, ionospheric and upper atmospheric physics, radiation belts, electromagnetic wave-particle interactions, lightning-ionosphere interaction and other Very Low Frequency (VLF) radioscience topics. Inan has brought to Stanford >$100M worth of Sponsored Research Projects from multiple US Government agencies, including NSF, ONR, NASA, AFRL, AFOSR, DARPA and DNA. His research group conducted VLF observations at >45 different spots on the globe in seven continents and also on a variety of Earth-orbiting satellites. He has served as Principal Dissertation Adviser for 60 Ph.D. students graduating between 1990 and 2015.

Inan was recruited to be the President of Koç University in Istanbul, Türkiye and took on this position in September 2009, serving as President for 12 years until Septeöner 2021. He became Professor (Emeritus) at Stanford in 2011, but remains active there Recalled to Active Duty, in addition to continuing his position as President (Emeritus) and Professor of Electrical Engineering & Physics at Koç University.

İnan has over 323 refereed scientific and technical papers.

With his brother, Aziz İnan, he has authored three textbooks on electromagnetics:

- Engineering Electromagnetics (Prentice Hall 1998)
- Electromagnetic Waves (Prentice Hall 1999)
- Principles of Plasma Physics for Scientists and Engineers (Cambridge Press 2011)

The first two textbooks were then combined into a second edition, Engineering Electromagnetics and Waves, by the same two authors along with Ryan Said.

== Membership and awards ==
İnan has been active member of various organizations since 1973 and he has been awarded by many institutions so far.

Besides being a member of the Institute of Electrical and Electronics Engineers (IEEE), the International Radio Science Association, the American Physical Society (APS), the Electromagnetic Academy, the Academy of Tau Beta Pi, the Sigma Xi Academy, and TUBA, İnan was also awarded by Aeronautics and Space Administration NASA with group achievement award in years 1983, 1998 and 2004.

== Research at Stanford ==
Research activities at Stanford include

- Effects of lightning on the ionosphere and magnetosphere
- Precipitating electrons from the radiation belts caused by VLF waves, both natural (lightning) and manmade (VLF transmitters)
- Generation of ELF/VLF waves with the HAARP facility in Alaska
- Wave-particle interactions between ELF/VLF waves and energetic radiation belt particles
- VLF remote sensing of ionospheric disturbances from cosmic gamma-ray sources
- AWESOME ELF/VLF instrument distribution under the International Heliophysical Year
- Investigation of naturally generated chorus and hiss waves in the ELF/VLF band

=== Inan Peak ===
Inan Peak rising to 2,451 metres (8,041 ft) 1.15 miles (1.85 km) west of Mount Kempe in the Royal Society Range of Victoria Land, Antarctica was named after him by the Advisory Committee on Antarctic Names in 1994.
