= Riu ō Te Ata Valley =

Valley in Antarctica

Riu ō Te Ata Valley (78°22′S 163°52′E) is a small, mostly ice-free valley at the southern side of Lake Morning in Victoria Land. It was named by the New Zealand Geographic Board in 1994; It is a Māori name meaning "valley of the morning", a pun on the name of the relief-vessel Morning.
