= Dailey Islands =

Islands of Antarctica

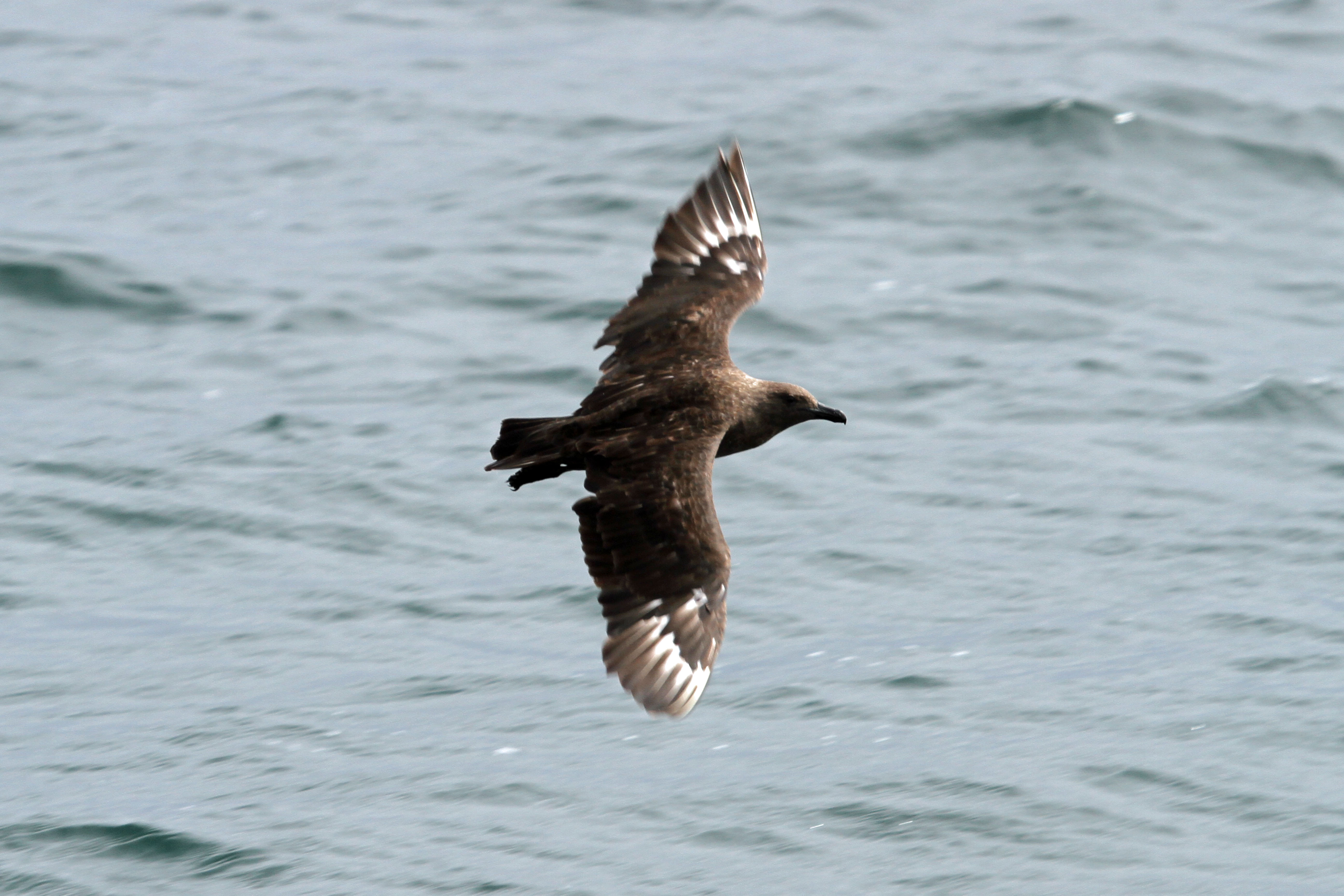
- South polar skuas breed in the IBA

- Location within Antarctica

Geography
- Location: Antarctica
- Coordinates: 77°53′S 165°8′E
- Total islands: 5

Administration
- Administered under the Antarctic Treaty System

Demographics
- Population: Uninhabited

The Dailey Islands are a group of small volcanic islands lying off the coast of Victoria Land, 9 kilometres (5 nmi) northeast of Cape Chocolate, in the northern part of the ice shelf bordering McMurdo Sound. They were discovered by the British National Antarctic Expedition, 1901–04, under Robert Falcon Scott, and named for Fred E. Dailey, the expedition carpenter.

== Islands ==
The Dailey Islands are:

- West Dailey Island (77°53′S 164°54′E), the largest and westernmost of the islands, located 9 kilometres (5 nmi) northeast of Cape Chocolate. Though visited by Scott's Discovery expedition, which named the island group, this western island appears to have been named by Scott's British Antarctic Expedition, 1910–13.
- Juergens Island (77°53′S 165°2′E) is 2.8 kilometres (1.5 nmi) east of West Dailey Island. It was named after Eric D. Juergens of Antarctic Support Associates, co-manager of a United States Antarctic Program project to clean up Antarctic waste sites beginning in 1991. He became director of safety, environment, and health activities, 1992–99, with heightened emphasis on environmental protection.
- Hatcher Island (77°53′S 165°4′E), on the east side of Juergens Island, 4 kilometres (2 nmi) east of West Dailey Island; Named after John H. Hatcher, III of ASA, who initiated a comprehensive waste management program for the USAP in 1992; he continued through 1999 as manager of the program.
- Uberuaga Island (77°53′S 165°17′E), an island 0.9 kilometres (0.5 nmi) long that is the easternmost feature in the Dailey Islands. It was named after Julia Mary Uberuaga, who from 1979 to 1999 made 20 consecutive Antarctic seasonal deployments working for contractors in support of USAP. She worked at South Pole Station as general field assistant the first two seasons; from 1981, she worked for 15 seasons as heavy equipment operator at Williams Field, McMurdo Sound, with assignments at field camps including Siple Dome, Siple Station, and Byrd Surface Camp. The last few seasons she operated a Caterpillar D7 Pearl on McMurdo Ice Shelf.
- Kuechle Island (77°52′S 165°13′E), an island lying 1.9 kilometres (1 nmi) northwest of Uberuaga Island that is the northernmost feature in the Dailey Islands. It was named after Valerian B. (Larry) Kuechle, a University of Minnesota electrical engineer with USAP who studied population dynamics and behavior of Weddell seals at Erebus Bay and McMurdo Sound, from 1968–69 to 1971–72.

== Important Bird Area ==
A 1,654 ha site comprising the island group and the intervening marine area has been designated an Important Bird Area (IBA) by BirdLife International because it supports about 77 breeding pairs of south polar skuas, based on a 1981 estimate. The closest permanent stations are New Zealand’s Scott Base and the United States’ McMurdo Station, some 35 km to the east on Ross Island.

== See also ==
- List of Antarctic and Subantarctic islands
