= Mount Rees (Victoria Land) =

Mountain in Ross Dependency, Antarctica

Mount Rees (78°29′S 162°29′E) is a mountain (2,314 metres (7,592 ft)) which rises above the cliffs at the west side of Koettlitz Névé, 3.5 nautical miles (6.5 km) SSW of Mount Talmadge, Victoria Land. It is named after Margaret N. Rees, geologist, University of Nevada, Las Vegas, who conducted field studies in the Transantarctic Mountains, including the Skelton Glacier area of the Hillary Coast, through several seasons, 1984–96.
