= The Pyramid (Antarctica) =

Antarctica mountain

- Location within Antarctica

Highest point
- Coordinates: 78°21′S 163°30′E

Geography
- Continent: Antarctica
- Region: Victoria Land

The Pyramid (78°21′S 163°30′E) is a small but distinctive peak in Antarctica just south of Pyramid Trough, at the west side of the Koettlitz Glacier. The descriptive name appears to have been first used by the British Antarctic Expedition, 1910–13 (BrAE).

== Location ==
The Pyramid is on a promontory on the west side of Koettlitz Glacier between Renegar Glacier to the southwest and Walcott Bay to the northeast. Dromedary Glacier is to the northwest. Nearby features include The Almond, Pyramid Trough and The Bulwark. The Alph River flows north through the Pyramid Trough.

== Features ==
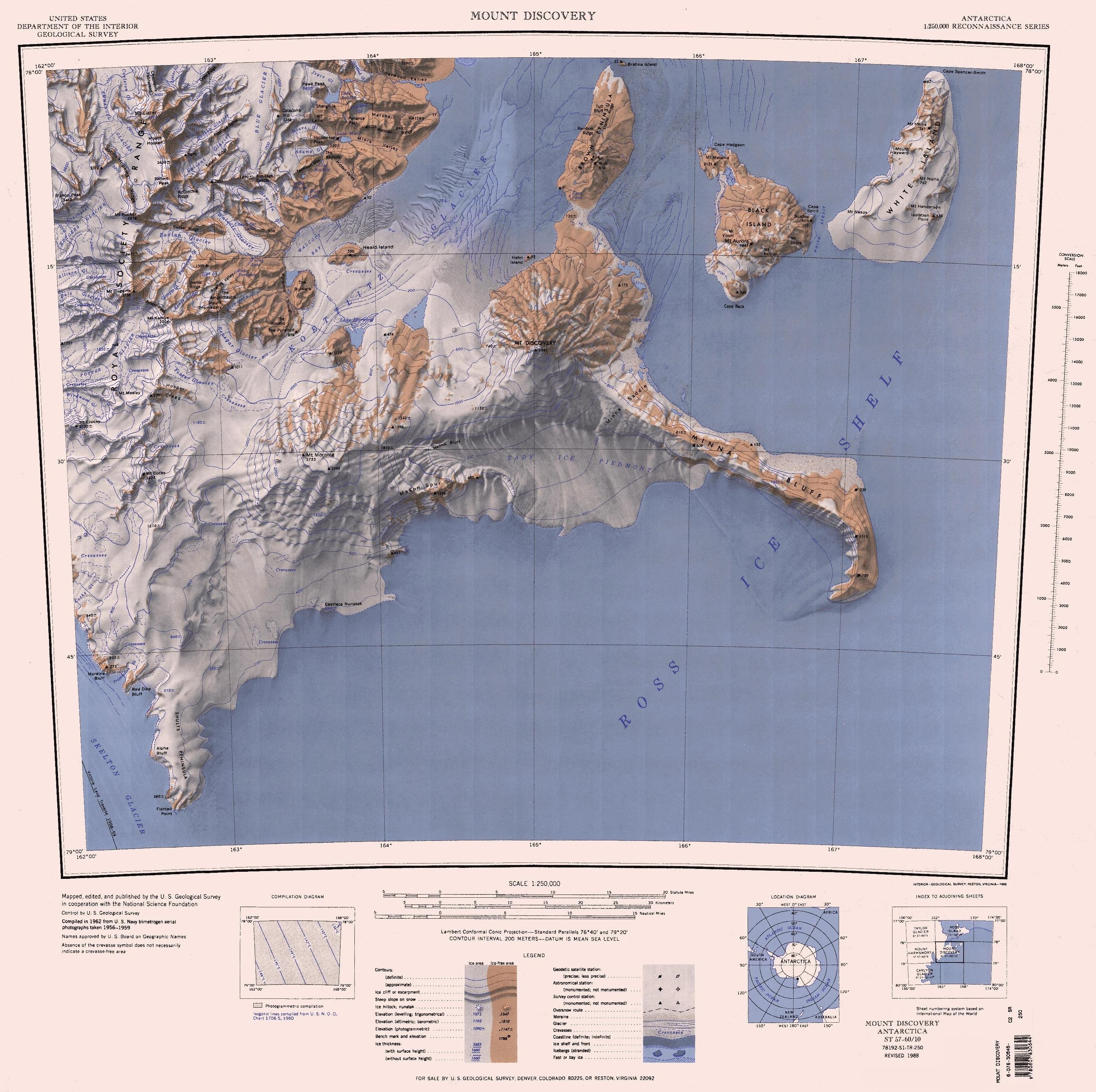
The Pyramid in north of map

=== The Almond ===
78°19′S 163°27′E. A bare, almond-shaped ridge of granite which separates the two coalescing channels of Pyramid Trough, located just west of The Pyramid on the west side of Koettlitz Glacier. Given this descriptive name by the New Zealand VUWAE, 1960-61.

=== Pyramid Trough ===
78°18′S 163°27′E. A deep trough immediately west of The Bulwark, through which a part of the Koettlitz Glacier formerly flowed north to Walcott Bay. Named by the VUWAE (1960-61) for its proximity to The Pyramid.

=== The Bulwark ===
78°17′S 163°33′E. A steep-walled granite bastion on the west side of Koettlitz Glacier, around which the glacier follows on its descent to Walcott Bay. First mapped by the BrAE, 1910-13. Named by the VUWAE (1960-61) because of its shape.

== Sources ==
- Alberts, Fred G., ed. (1995), Geographic Names of the Antarctic (PDF) (2 ed.), United States Board on Geographic Names This article incorporates public domain material from websites or documents of the United States Board on Geographic Names.
- "Alph River", Geographic Names Information System, United States Geological Survey, United States Department of the Interior
- Mount Discovery, USGS: United States Geological Survey

This article incorporates public domain material from websites or documents of the United States Geological Survey.
