= Reginald Koettlitz =

British polar explorer (1861–1916)

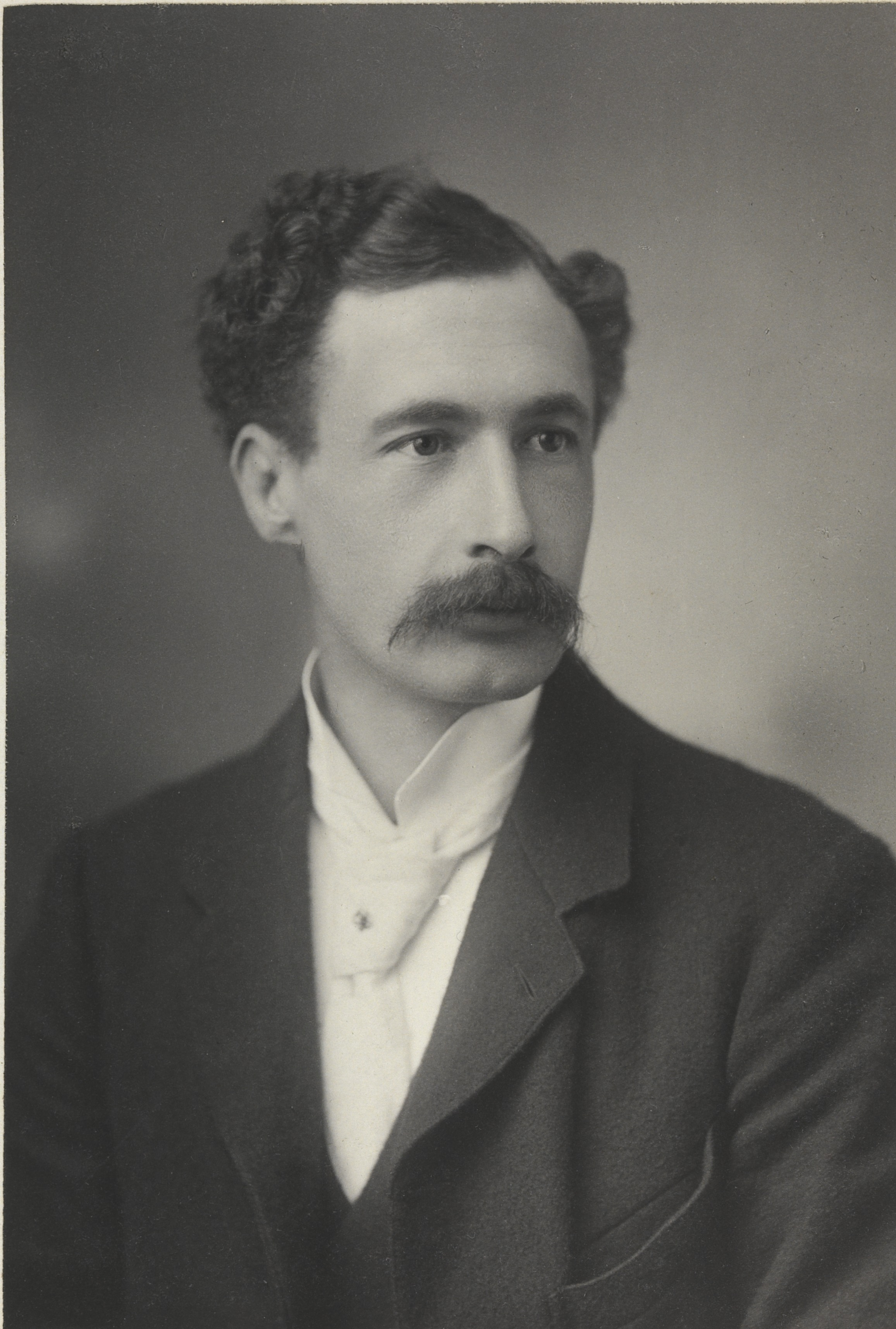
- Reginald Koettlitz
- Born: December 23, 1860; Ostend, Belgium
- Died: 1916; Cradock, South Africa
- Occupations: Physician, polar explorer
- Known for: Jackson–Harmsworth and Discovery Expeditions; Koettlitz Glacier

Reginald Koettlitz (1860–1916) was a British physician and polar explorer. He participated in the Jackson–Harmsworth expedition to Franz Josef Land and in the Discovery Expedition to Antarctica.

== Early life ==
Reginald Koettlitz was born on 23 December 1860 in Ostend. His father was a Lutheran minister, and his mother was English. He was educated at Dover College and later Guy's Hospital in London, where he received training as a physician. He practiced medicine near Dover.

== Exploration ==
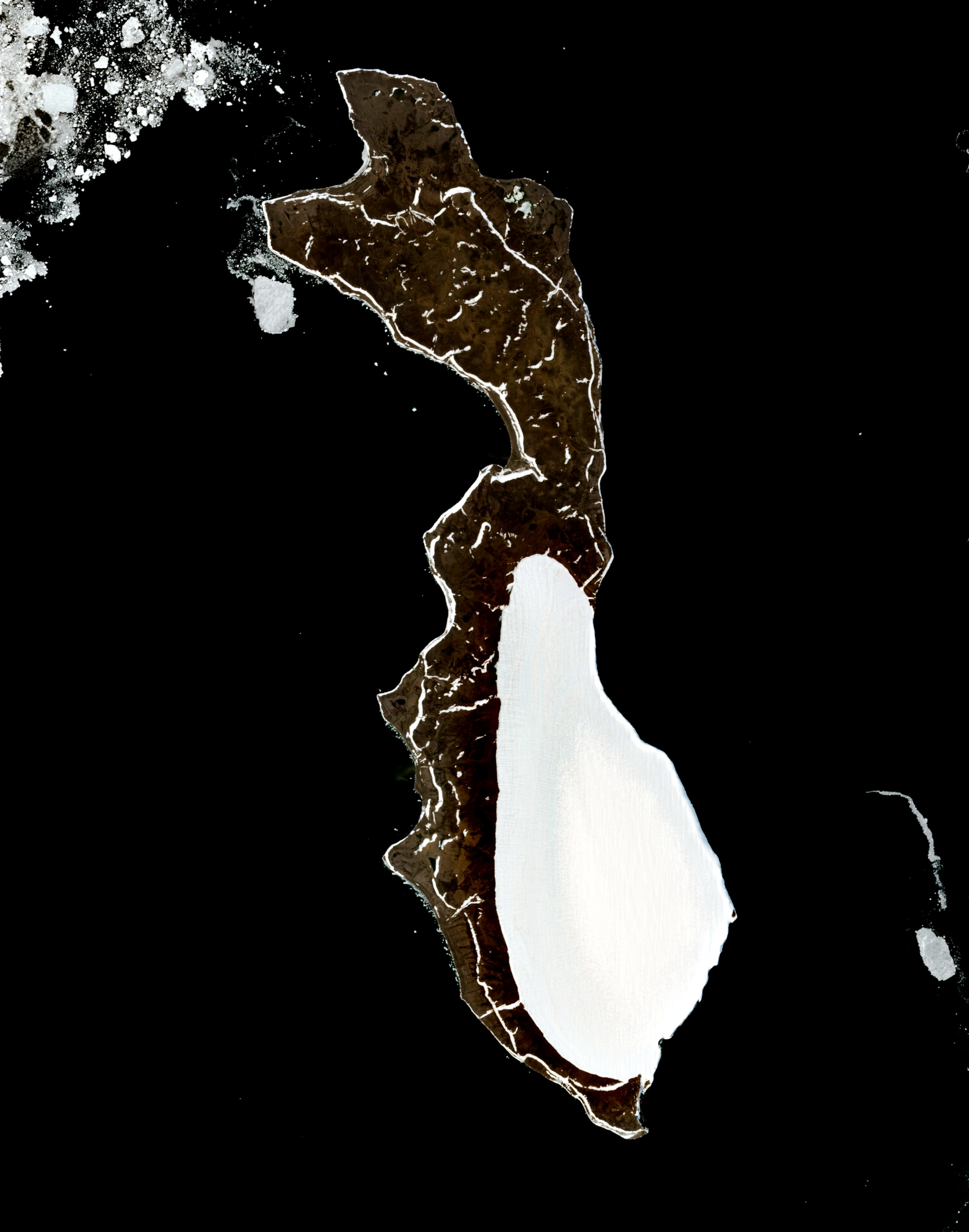
Koettlitz Island, Franz Josef Land

In 1894, Koettlitz joined the Jackson–Harmsworth expedition to Franz Josef Land in the Arctic, as physician and geologist. On returning to Dover, brought back a polar bear, which is still in the Dover Museum. Koettlitz Island (Ketlitsa Ostrova) – a low-lying island in the British Channel in the Franz Josef Land archipelago – is named after him. While on the expedition, he was also called on to treat the captain of the expedition's ship Windward. Koettlitz discovered that the captain had syphilis. Whilst on this Expedition Koettlitz designed and manufactured a tent that is the basic design of tents used in polar exploration for many years after. (Scott's forgotten Surgeon -AA Jones)

In 1900 he travelled to Somaliland and Abyssinia with Herbert Weld Blundell. He also journeyed to the Amazon.

In 1901, Koettlitz volunteered for Robert Falcon Scott's Discovery Expedition to Antarctica, as physician and botanist. Koettlitz played a key role in the provisioning of the expedition. He was a firm supporter of the view that eating fresh meat was the best way to prevent and treat scurvy. His advice proved crucial when the expedition suffered from an outbreak of this disease.

On this expedition Koettlitz took the first colour photos of Antarctica - These, along with his scientific reports did not appear in the final reports of the Expedition - apparently Scott had little respect for him - 55 colour prints and the logs are now missing.(Scott's forgotten Surgeon -AA Jones)

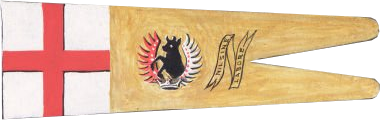
Sledge flag used by Koettlitz in Antarctica during the Discovery Expedition

He also carried out scientific work. Many of his samples are held in the archives of the Natural History Museum, London. His assistant on this trip was E.A. Wilson, later surgeon on Scott's ill-fated Terra Nova Expedition. On a trip he led across McMurdo Sound, Koettlitz discovered two glacial features later named after him: the Koettlitz Glacier and the Koettlitz Névé. For his role in the Discovery Expedition, Koettlitz was awarded a medal from the Royal Geographical Society.

Later in life, he practised medicine in Cradock, South Africa. He died from dysentery in January 1916, as did his French born wife on the same day.

== Publications ==
- Kœttlitz, Reginald (February 1898). "Observations on the Geology of Franz Josef Land". Quarterly Journal of the Geological Society. 54 (1–4): 620–645. doi:10.1144/GSL.JGS.1898.054.01-04.44. S2CID 130568493.
- Koettlitz, Reginald (August 1900). "A journey through Somaliland and southern Abyssinia to the Shangalla or Berta country and the blue Nile, and through the Sudan to Egypt". Scottish Geographical Magazine. 16 (8): 467–490. doi:10.1080/00369220008733179.
- KŒttlitz, Reginald (January 1901). "From Para to Manaos: A trip up the lower Amazon". Scottish Geographical Magazine. 17 (1): 11–30. doi:10.1080/00369220108733217.
- "The British Antarctic Expedition: Precautions against scurvy in the victualling of the "Discovery"". BMJ. 1 (2145): 342–343. 8 February 1902. doi:10.1136/bmj.1.2145.342.
