= Mount Rücker =

Mountain in Ross Dependency, Antarctica

- Location within Antarctica

Highest point
- Coordinates: 78°11′S 162°32′E

Geography
- Location: Victoria Land, Antarctica
- Parent range: Royal Society Range

Mount Rücker (78°11′S 162°32′E) is a mountain, 3,815 metres (12,516 ft) high, immediately south of Johns Hopkins Ridge, in the Royal Society Range, Victoria Land, Antarctica. It was discovered by the British National Antarctic Expedition (BrNAE; 1901-04) which named it for Sir Arthur Rucker, Honorary Secretary of the Royal Society.

== Location ==
Mount Rücker is in central Royal Society Range on the main north-south ridge that includes Mount Lister to the north and Mount Huggins to the south. The Johns Hopkins Ridge extends to the north. Rutgers Glacier forms to the west of the mountain and flows southwest to the Skelton Glacier, as do Allison Glacier and Dale Glacier which form on the ridge that extends down to Mount Huggins. Rücker Ridge extends east from Mount Rücker . Radian Glacier and Walcott Glacier flow southeast from the ridge system towards Koettlitz Glacier.

== Features ==
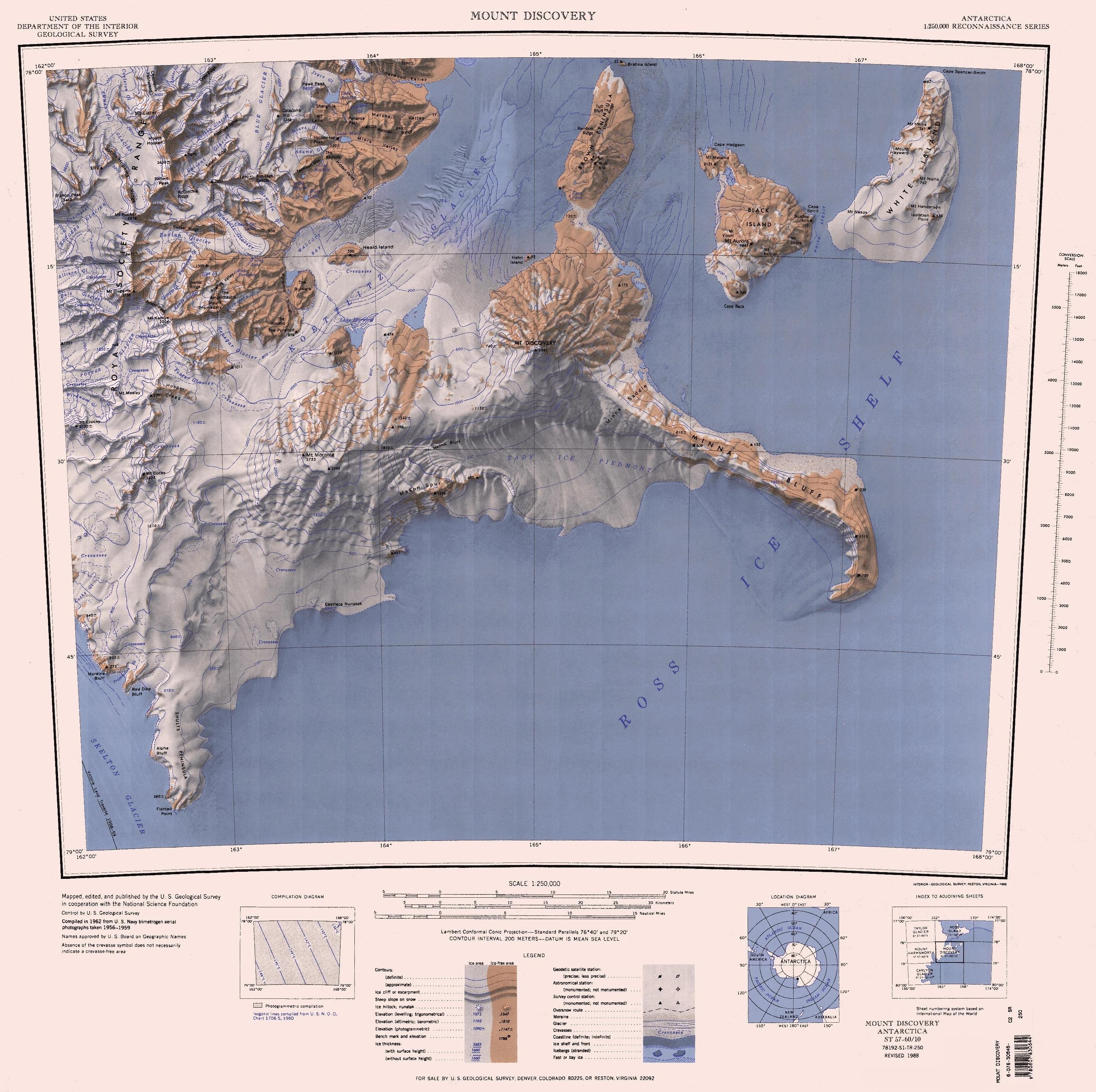
Mount Rücker in northwest of map

Features and nearby features include:

=== Johns Hopkins Ridge ===
78°08′S 162°28′E. A prominent ridge running northward from Mount Rücker for 6 nautical miles (11 km; 6.9 mi). Mapped by the United States Geological Survey (USGS) from ground surveys and Navy air photos. Named by the United States Advisory Committee on Antarctic Names (US-ACAN) in 1963 for the Johns Hopkins University of Baltimore, Maryland, which has sent many researchers to Antarctica, and in association with nearby Carleton and Rutgers Glaciers.

=== Engebretson Peak ===
78.1333333°S 162.45°E. A peak rising to 3,271 metres (10,732 ft) between Sladen Summit and Borg Bastion in Johns Hopkins Ridge. Named by US-ACAN (1994) after Mark J. Engebretson, upper atmosphere physicist, Augsburg College, an authority in the correlation of Arctic, Antarctic, and spacecraft data.

=== Borg Bastion ===
78°10′S 162°29′E A prominent summit, 3,730 metres (12,240 ft) high, on Johns Hopkins Ridge, standing 1.7 nautical miles (3.1 km; 2.0 mi) northwest of Mount Rücker. Named by US-ACAN in 1994 after Scott G. Borg, a geologist who conducted field investigations in Antarctica, 1978-1994; from 1992, Program Manager for Polar Earth Sciences, Office of Polar Programs, NSF.

=== Rester Peak ===
78.1666667°S 162.6166667°E. A peak, 3,638 metres (11,936 ft) high, 1.25 nautical miles (2.32 km; 1.44 mi) northeast of Mount Rücker. Named by the US-ACAN (1994) after A. Carl Rester, astrophysicist, Institute for Astrophysics and Planetary Exploration, University of Florida. He was responsible for the instrumentation of a huge astrophysical observation balloon that was launched over Antarctica in January 1988.

=== Rücker Ridge ===
78°12′S 162°50′E. A high spur descending east from pointed Mount Rücker and forming the divide between Radian and Walcott Glaciers. Named after Mount Rücker by the New Zealand Victoria University of Wellington Antarctic Expedition (VUWAE), 1960-61.

=== Jigsaw Rock Gut ===
78.2°S 162.8666667°E. A prominent gully 0.5 nautical miles (0.93 km; 0.58 mi) west of Margaret Hill on Rücker Ridge. Named by the New Zealand Geographic Board (NZGB) (1994) following work in the area by a NZGS field party, 1977-78. Intense and intricate folds interlock like a jigsaw puzzle in the marble wall forming the eastern side of this gully.

=== Margaret Hill ===
78.2°S 162.9166667°E. A peak rising to 1,874 metres (6,148 ft) on Rücker Ridge, 5 nautical miles (9.3 km; 5.8 mi) east of Mount Rücker. Named after Margaret Clark, a geologist with the 1977-78 New Zealand Geological Survey field party in this area. The form of the name has been selected to avoid redundancy of the name Clark in the region.

=== Sulphide Pass ===
78.198°S 162.733°E A saddle on Rücker Ridge 4 kilometres (2.5 mi) east of Mount Rücker. A band of extremely hard pyritized shale is exposed in the saddle/pass, and when hit by a hammer the rock gives off a characteristic sulphurous smell.

=== Puke Toropa Mountain ===
78.2333333°S 162.4166667°E. A mostly ice-covered mountain. 3,465 metres (11,368 ft) high, standing 3.3 nautical miles (6.1 km; 3.8 mi) south-southwest of Mount Rücker. A Maori name given by New Zealand Geographic Board (NZGB) in 1994 meaning “circular hill.”

=== Mount Huggins ===
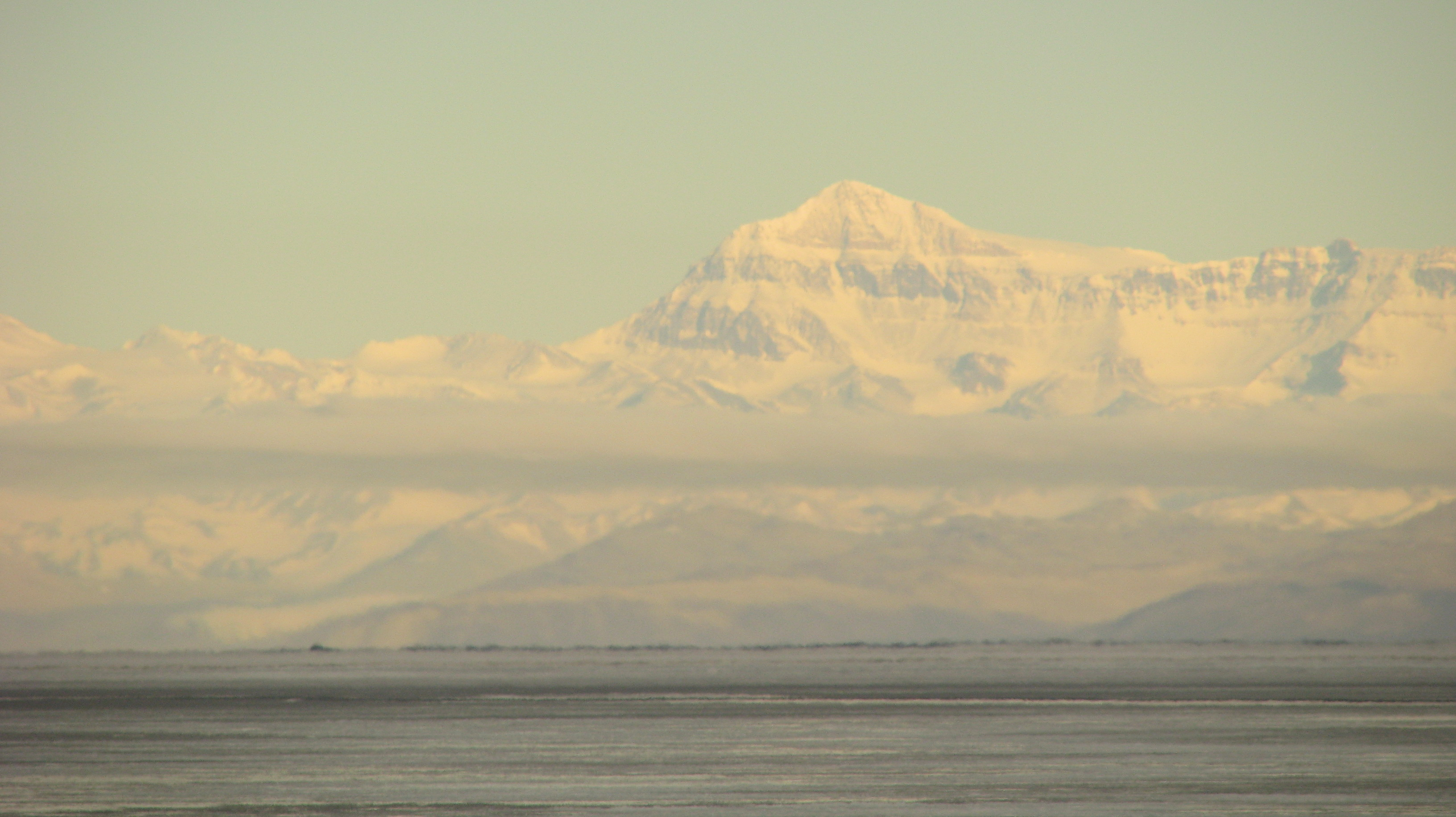
Mt Huggins seen from McMurdo Station, March 2015

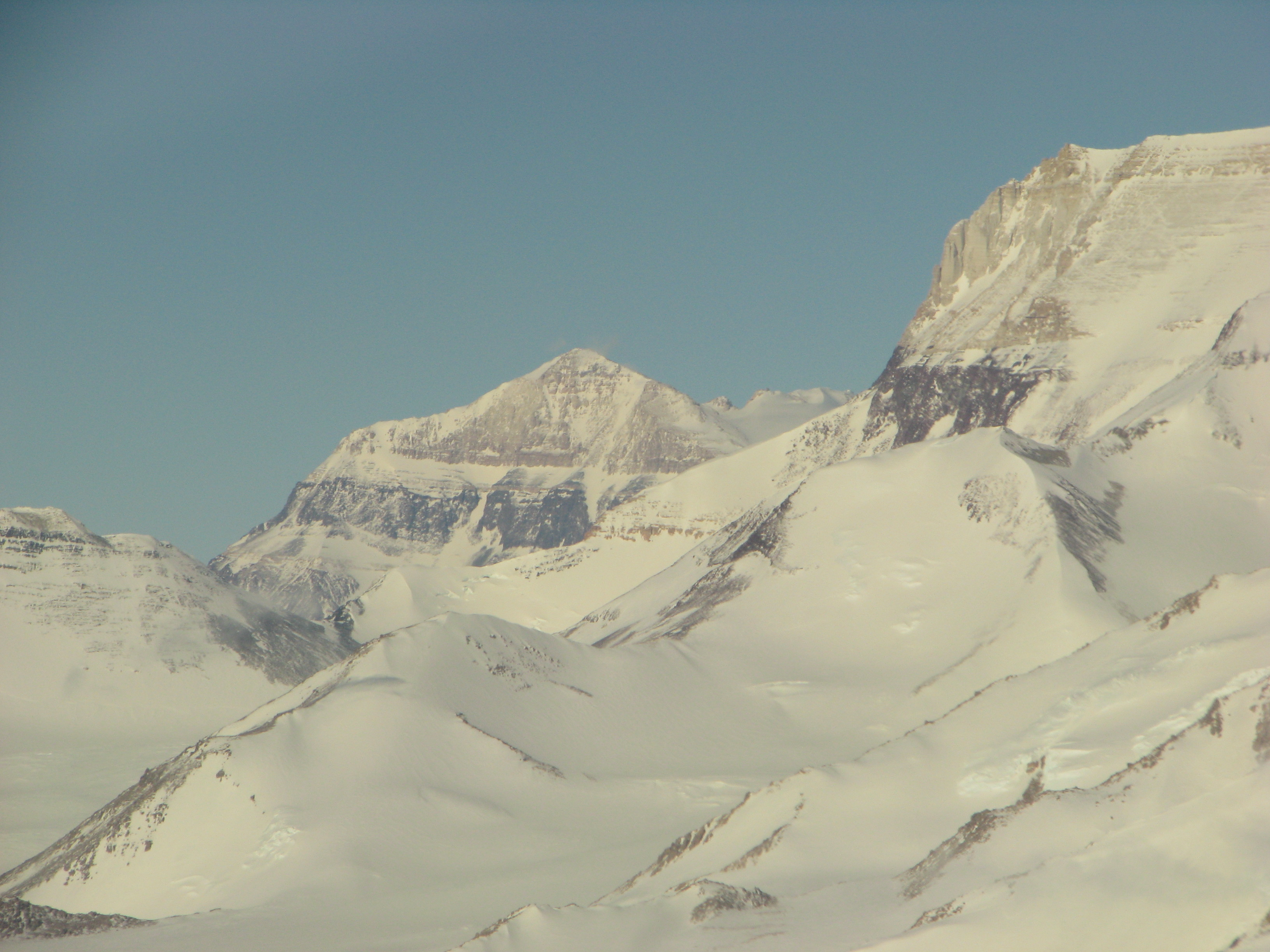
Mt Huggins (center peak) seen from air over Miers Valley, November 2013

78°17′S 162°29′E. A large conical mountain, 3,735 m, surmounting the heads of Allison, Dale, and Potter Glaciers in the Royal Society Range. Discovered by the British National Antarctic Expedition (BrNAE; 1901-04) which named it for Sir William Huggins, President of the Royal Society, 1900-05. The mountain was first ascended by the explorer Richard Brooke in 1957.

=== Waiparahoaka Mountain ===
78.2833333°S 162.4166667°E. A mostly ice-covered mountain, 3,608 metres (11,837 ft) high, on the southwest shoulder of Mount Huggins. A Maori name applied by the New Zealand Geographic Board (NZGB) (1994) meaning “mountain of many glaciers.”

=== Abbott Spur ===
78.25611°S 161.89500°E. An ice-covered spur which separates the lower ends of Rutgers Glacier and Allison Glacier on the west side of Royal Society Range. Named by US-ACAN (1994) after Robin R. Abbott, ASA, Helicopter Field Operations Coordinator at McMurdo Station, active in coordination and planning of science support in Antarctica from 1984.

== See also ==
- List of ultras of Antarctica

== Sources ==
- Abbott Spur, AADC: Australian Antarctic Data Centre
- Alberts, Fred G., ed. (1995), Geographic Names of the Antarctic (PDF) (2 ed.), United States Board on Geographic Names This article incorporates public domain material from websites or documents of the United States Board on Geographic Names.
- Amodeo, Christian (November 2007), "Forward crawl across the White Continent", Geographical, Royal Geographical Society (with the Institute of British Geographers)
- "Engebretson Peak", Geographic Names Information System, United States Geological Survey, United States Department of the Interior
- "Jigsaw Rock Gut", Geographic Names Information System, United States Geological Survey, United States Department of the Interior
- "Margaret Hill", Geographic Names Information System, United States Geological Survey, United States Department of the Interior
- Mount Discovery, USGS: United States Geological Survey
- "Puke Toropa Mountain", Geographic Names Information System, United States Geological Survey, United States Department of the Interior
- "Rester Peak", Geographic Names Information System, United States Geological Survey, United States Department of the Interior
- Sulphide Pass, NZG: New Zealand Gazetteer
- "Waiparahoaka Mountain", Geographic Names Information System, United States Geological Survey, United States Department of the Interior

This article incorporates public domain material from websites or documents of the United States Geological Survey.
