= Koettlitz Glacier =

Glacier in Antarctica

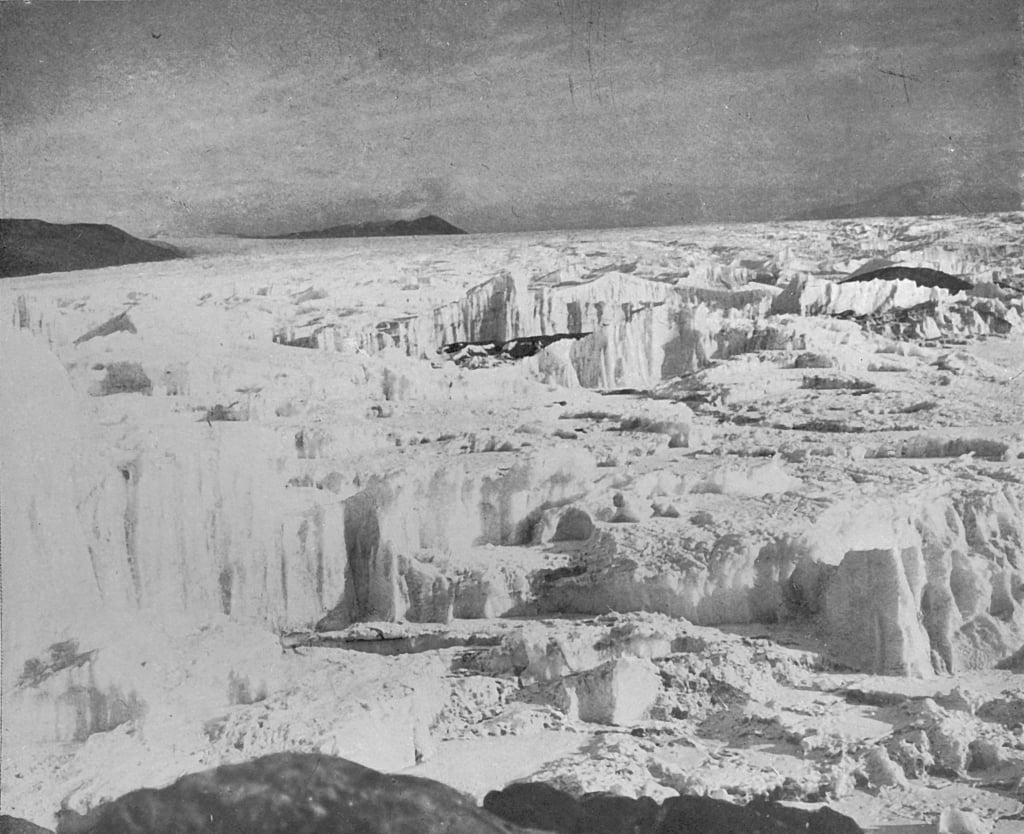
- Koettlitz Glacier, Antarctica, just North of Heald Island showing ice pinnacles etc. c. 1911

- Location within Antarctica
- Location: Ross Dependency
- Coordinates: 78°15′S 164°15′E
- Terminus: Ross Ice Shelf

Koettlitz Glacier (78°15′S 164°15′E) is a large Antarctic glacier lying west of Mount Morning and Mount Discovery in the Royal Society Range, flowing from the vicinity of Mount Cocks northeastward between Brown Peninsula and the mainland into the ice shelf of McMurdo Sound.

== Naming and exploration ==
Koettlitz Glacier was discovered by the British National Antarctic Expedition (1901–04) which named it for Dr. Reginald Koettlitz, physician and botanist of the expedition.

== Glaciology ==
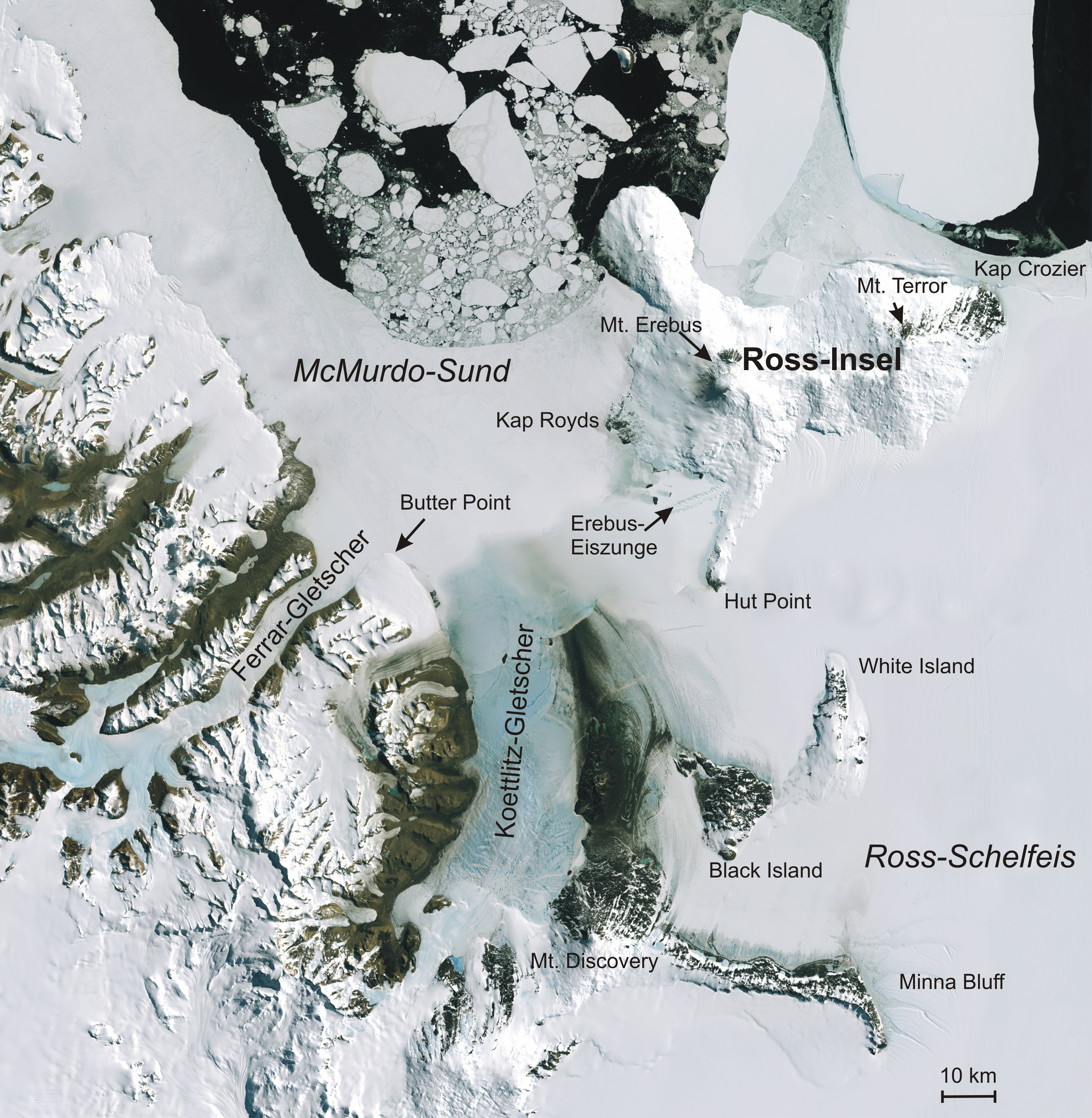
Satellite photograph of the area round McMurdo Station. Koettlitz Glacier is large darker blue area at lower center.

The Koettlitz Glacier appears to have been smaller during the Last Glacial Maximum (LGM) than it is today, while the Ross Ice Shelf was larger. There is evidence that during the LGM the mouth of the Pyramid Trough was blocked by grounded Ross Sea ice until at least 11,000 years ago. In the last 3,000 years the glacier has advanced, and today the mouth of ice-free Pyramid Trough is blocked by the Koettlitz Glacier. Under this hypothesis, the glacier may have been thicker at the coast due to buttressing, but may have been no thicker, perhaps even thinner upstream due to reduced accumulation. This is in contrast to the view that glaciers feeding the Ross Sea would have been larger during the LGM due to increased accumulation, and the ice shelf smaller.

The Koettlitz Ice Tongue lies along the west shore of McMurdo Sound. It is of major scientific interest due to the unique collection of fish and marine invertebrates on its ablating surface. Between 1910 and 1994 it has retreated significantly. In 1910–13 the ice front was 5 kilometres (3.1 mi) in front of the Dailey Islands. Since then at least 300 square kilometres (120 sq mi) of ice has calved off the ice tongue. A break-out of ice in 1979 or 1980 caused about 80 square kilometres (31 sq mi) of ice to be lost from the tongue. As of 2017 only two of these islands are still connected to the ice tongue.

== Course ==
The glacier forms to the northeast of Mount Cocks and runs northeast to the north of the Mount Discovery massif. To the north of Hooper Crags it is joined from the west by Foster Glacier and then by Reneger Glacier, below Dromedary Glacier. It continues northeast past Lake Lake Morning to the south and past Walcott Bay and Heald Island to the north. Walcott Bay is fed by Walcott Glacier and Howchin Glacier. Walcott Glacier in turn is fed by Radian Glacier, Pipecleaner Glacier and Glimpse Glacier. Past is grounding line it flows past Hahn Island at the foot of Mount Discovery. It enters the McMurdo Ice Shelf past Brown Peninsula and Bratina Island to the east. Cape Chocolate is to the west of its mouth, and McMurdo Station and Ross Island are opposite its mouth.

== Tributaries ==
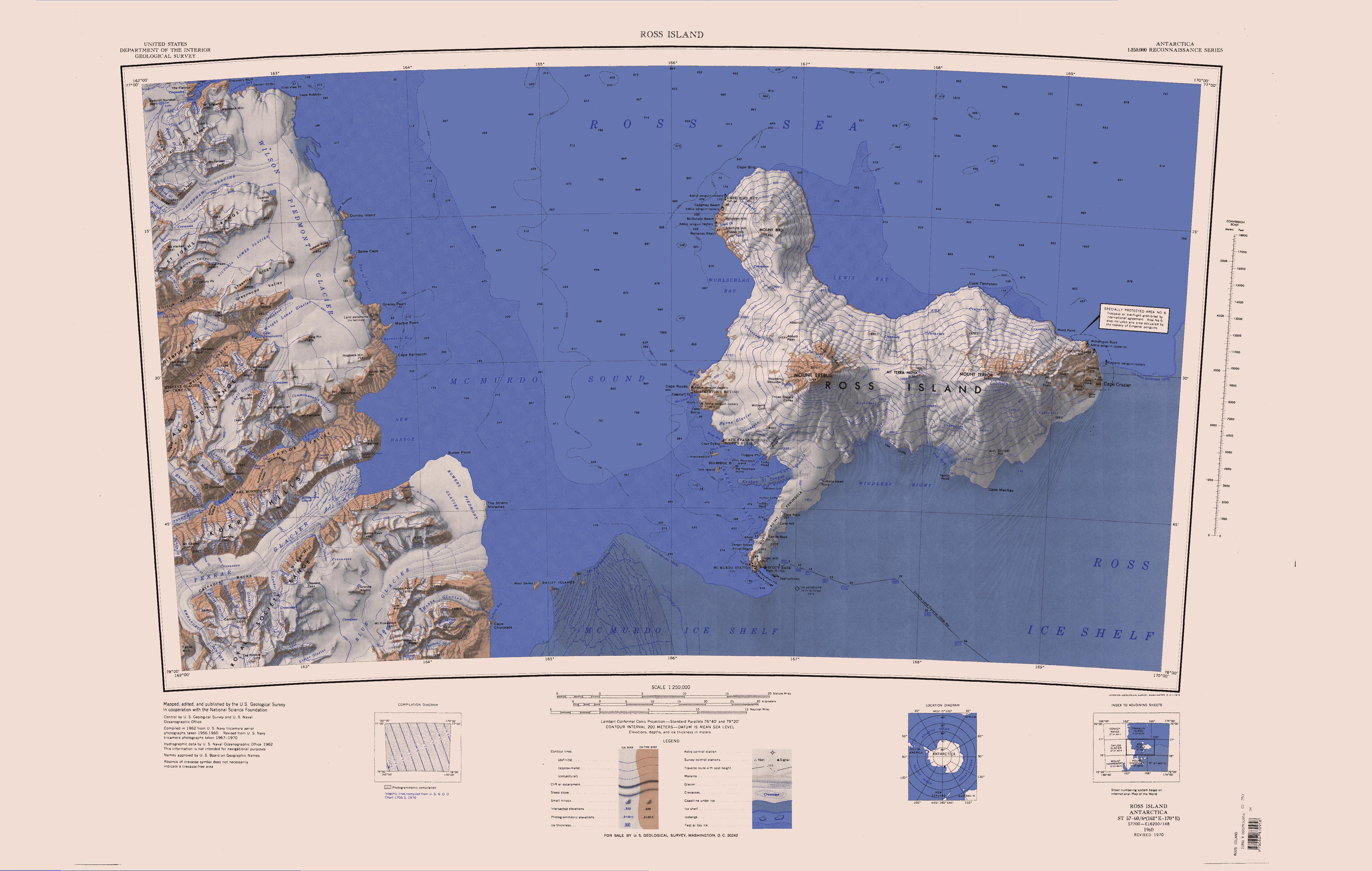
McMurdo Ice Shelf and Ross Island at the mouth of Koettlitz Glacier

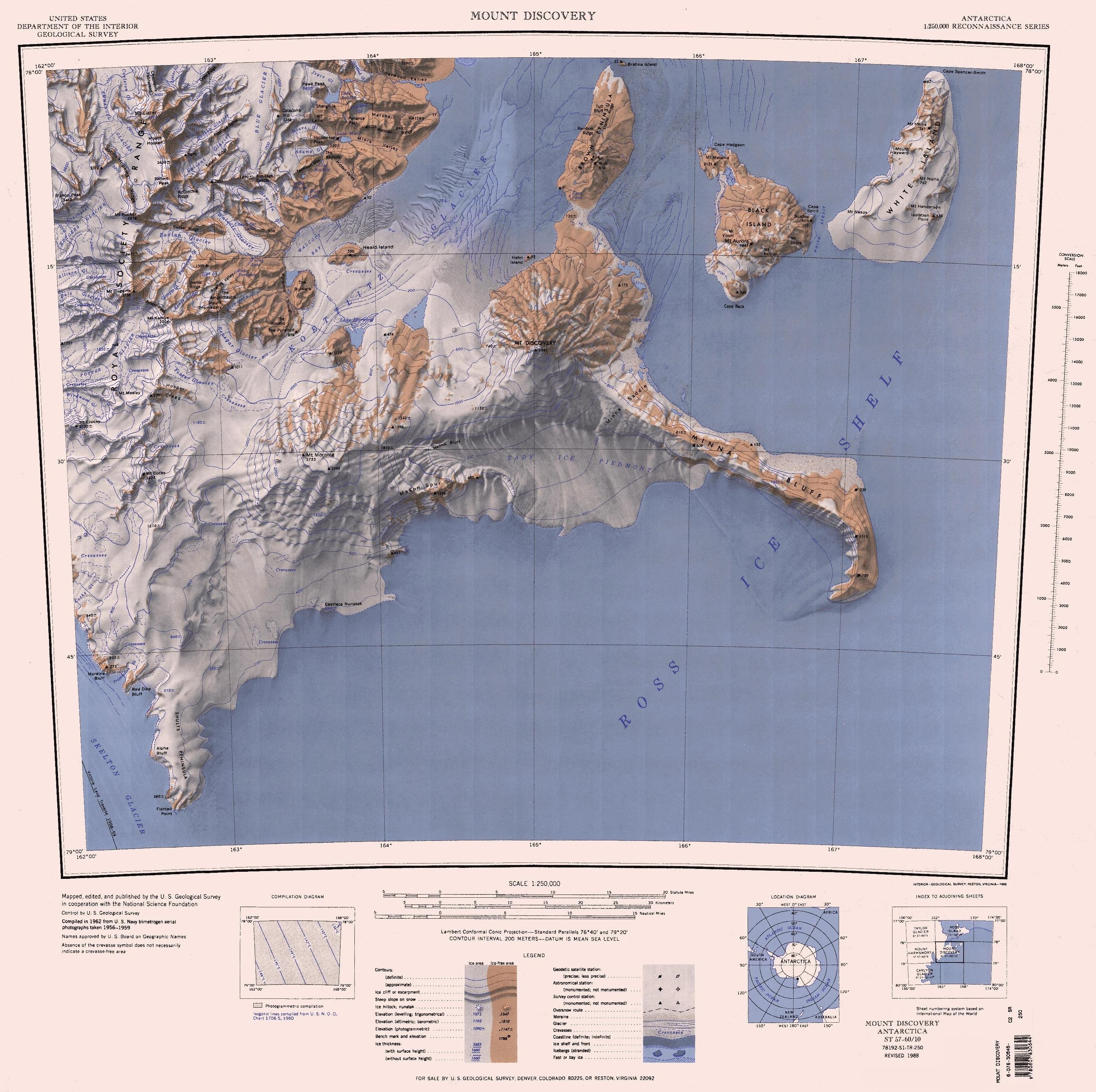
Koettlitz Glacier (northwest of map)

Glaciers and streams in the catchment area of the Koettlitz Glacier are listed below. Some may not contribute to the Koettlitz Glacier.

=== Koettlitz Névé ===
78.45°S 163°E A roughly circular névé about 7 nautical miles (13 km; 8.1 mi) wide at the head of Koettlitz Glacier. The névé is bounded to the west and south by Mount Talmadge, Mount Rees and Mount Cocks; to the east by Mount Morning. Named by United States Advisory Committee on Antarctic Names (US-ACAN) (1994) in association with Koettlitz Glacier.

=== Foster Glacier ===
78°24′S 162°50′E. A glacier in the Royal Society Range, 4 nautical miles (7.4 km; 4.6 mi) south of Mount Kempe, flowing southeast into the Koettlitz Glacier. Named by US-ACAN in 1963 for Major James Foster, United States Marine Corps (USMC), assistant air operations officer for U.S. Navy Task Force 43 in Antarctica, 1960. On the north flank of the glacier is a volcano crater designated Foster Crater.

=== Renegar Glacier ===
78°22′S 163°08′E. A steep glacier flowing southeast from Mount Dromedary into Koettlitz Glacier. Mapped by United States Geological Survey (USGS) from ground surveys and U.S. Navy air photos, 1956–62. Named by US-ACAN for Lt. Garland Renegar, USN, R4D aircraft pilot at McMurdo Station, 1960. Not: Renagar Glacier.

=== Dromedary Glacier ===
78°18′S 163°10′E. A small alpine glacier occupying a high cirque on the east side of Mount Dromedary in the Royal Society Range. Named by the Victoria University of Wellington Antarctic Expedition (VUWAE) (1960–61) for its proximity to Mount Dromedary.

=== Bulwark Stream ===
78.2666667°S 163.5333333°E. A meltwater stream from Koettlitz Glacier on the east side of The Bulwark, a mountain outlier south of Walcott Bay, Scott Coast. The stream flows north and then west, following the perimeter of The Bulwark to enter Trough Lake and the Alph River system. Named by New Zealand Geographic Board (NZGB) (1994) in association with The Bulwark.

=== Alph River ===
78.2°S 163.75°E. A small river, flowing in summertime, on the northern side of Koettlitz Glacier, Scott Coast. It rises from Koettlitz ice at the upper end of Pyramid Trough and from south to north includes Pyramid Ponds, Trough Lake, Walcott Lake, Howchin Lake, and Alph Lake. The portion north of Pyramid Trough was explored and named in February 1911 by the British Antarctic Expedition (BrAE) Western Journey Party led by Thomas Griffith Taylor. He reported that the stream continues north a considerable distance under moraine and ultimately subglacially beneath Koettlitz Glacier to the Ross Sea. This led to the name from a passage in Samuel Taylor Coleridge’s poem Kubla Khan: "Where Alph the sacred river ran, Through caverns measureless to man, Down to a sunless sea."

=== Walcott Glacier ===
78°14′S 163°15′E. Glacier between Radian and Howchin Glaciers, descending eastward from the Royal Society Range toward Walcott Bay. Named by Taylor of the BrAE (1910–13), presumably for Charles Doolittle Walcott, Director of the U.S. Geological Survey (1894–1907) and Secretary of the Smithsonian Institution, 1907–28.

=== Howchin Glacier ===
78°12′S 163°22′E. Glacier between the Ward and Walcott Glaciers, on the east side of the Royal Society Range. Discovered by a party led by Griffith Taylor of the BrAE (1910–13) and named for Prof. W. Howchin, geologist of Adelaide.

=== Howchin South Stream ===
78.2166667°S 163.4166667°E. A meltwater stream draining from the south side of Howchin Glacier. It flows eastward into Howchin Lake southward of Howchin North Stream. Named by New Zealand Geographic Board (NZGB) (1994) in association with Howchin Glacier.

=== Howchin North Stream ===
78.2°S 163.4166667°E}. Description: A meltwater stream draining from the north side of Howchin Glacier in Denton Hills, Scott Coast. It flows eastward into Howchin Lake northward of Howchin South Stream. Named by New Zealand Geographic Board (NZGB) (1994) in association with Howchin Glacier.

=== Radian Glacier ===
78°13′S 163°00′E. A glacier on the east side of the Royal Society Range, descending from a high cirque just southeast of Mount Rucker and flowing east toward Walcott Glacier. In the measurements made of this glacier by the VUWAE (1960–61), one of the survey angles, by chance, was exactly one radian, and the glacier came to be referred to by this term.

=== Pipecleaner Glacier ===
78°14′S 162°51′E. A glacier formed by the coalescence of numerous small alpine glaciers on the east side of Mount Huggins. Together with Glimpse Glacier it joins the Radian Glacier where that stream meets the north arm of Dismal Ridge. Its surface is marked by innumerable bands of moraine reminiscent of pipecleaners. Named by New Zealand VUWAE, 1960–61.

=== Glimpse Glacier ===
78°16′S 162°46′E. An alpine glacier composed of two segments, separated by an icefall, which flow northeast from a névé in the area between Mount Kempe and Mount Huggins. It joins the Pipecleaner Glacier 2 nautical miles (3.7 km; 2.3 mi) south of the confluence of the latter with the Radian Glacier. So named by the VUWAE, 1960–61, because it was up this glacier that the geologists traversed to the Koettlitz-Skelton divide at the ridge crest in order to gain their only glimpse of the polar plateau in January 1961.

== Other features ==
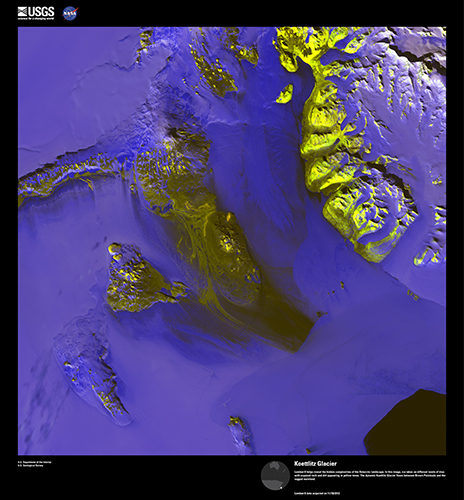
Satellite image of the glacier (south at top). In this image, ice takes on different levels of blue with exposed rock and dirt appearing in yellow tones.

=== Mount Cocks ===
78°31′S 162°30′E. Mountain, 2,440 metres (8,010 ft) high, in the south part of the Royal Society Range. It stands at the head of Koettlitz Glacier and forms a part of the divide between the Koettlitz and the lower Skelton Glacier. Discovered by the BrNAE (1901–04) which named it for E.L. Somers Cocks, then Treasurer of the Royal Geographical Society.

=== Barlow Rocks ===
78°29′S 163°24′E. A group of rocks standing below the NW slopes of Mount Morning on the south margin of upper Koettlitz Glacier. Named by US-ACAN in 1994 after Roger A. Barlow, USGS cartographer, a member of the satellite surveying team at South Pole Station, winter party 1992.

=== Hooper Crags ===
78°25′S 162°43′E. A rocky spur 3 nautical miles (5.6 km; 3.5 mi) long, lying at the south side of Foster Glacier in the Royal Society Range. Named by US-ACAN in 1963 for Lt. Benjamin F. Hooper, helicopter pilot with U.S. Navy Squadron VX-6, who wintered at McMurdo Station in 1960.

=== Lake Morning ===
78°21′S 163°53′E. An ice lake, nearly 2 nautical miles (3.7 km; 2.3 mi) long, lying on the northern side of the Riu ō Te Ata Valley, approximately 9 nautical miles (17 km; 10 mi) north of Mount Morning along the east side of the Koettlitz Glacier. Mapped by USGS from ground surveys and Navy air photos. Named in 1963 by US-ACAN in association with Mount Morning.

=== Walcott Bay ===
78°14′S 163°37′E. A bay indenting the coast of Victoria Land between Walcott Glacier and Heald Island. Named by the BrAE (1910–13) in association with Walcott Glacier.

=== Heald Island ===
78°15′S 163°49′E. An island, 3 nautical miles (5.6 km; 3.5 mi) long and 555 metres (1,821 ft) high, which projects through the ice of the Koettlitz Glacier just east of Walcott Bay. Discovered and named by the BrNAE (1901–04) for Seaman William L. Heald, a member of the expedition who saved the life of Ferrar when the latter was suffering from scurvy in 1902.

=== Hahn Island ===
78°15′S 164°58′E. Island 1 nautical mile (1.9 km; 1.2 mi) long, lying 7 nautical miles (13 km; 8.1 mi) north of Mount Discovery, on the east side of Koettlitz Glacier. Mapped by USGS from ground surveys and Navy air photos. Named by US-ACAN in 1963 for Cdr. James Hahn, USN, public information officer on the staff of the Commander, U.S. Naval Support Force, Antarctica, for several years preceding 1963.

=== Cape Chocolate ===
77°56′S 164°35′E. Small, dark cape forming the south side of Salmon Bay on the coast of Victoria Land. It is made up of morainic material from the west margin of the Koettlitz Glacier. Discovered by the BrNAE (1901–04) under Scott, and probably so named because of the color of the morainic material.

== Sources ==
- Alberts, Fred G., ed. (1995), Geographic Names of the Antarctic (PDF) (2 ed.), United States Board on Geographic Names This article incorporates public domain material from websites or documents of the United States Board on Geographic Names.
- "Alph River", Geographic Names Information System, United States Geological Survey, United States Department of the Interior
- "Bulwark Stream", Geographic Names Information System, United States Geological Survey, United States Department of the Interior
- Gow, Anthony J.; Govoni, John W. (1994), "An 80 year record of retreat of the Koettlitz Ice Tongue, McMurdo Sound, Antarctica", Annals of Glaciology, 20: 237–241, doi:10.3189/1994AoG20-1-237-241
- "Howchin North Stream", Geographic Names Information System, United States Geological Survey, United States Department of the Interior
- "Howchin South Stream", Geographic Names Information System, United States Geological Survey, United States Department of the Interior
- "Koettlitz Névé", Geographic Names Information System, United States Geological Survey, United States Department of the Interior
- Mount Discovery, USGS: United States Geological Survey
- Ross Island, USGS: United States Geological Survey
- Walther, Tess Louise (2020), "Reconstruction of Koettlitz Glacier, Southern McMurdo Sound, Antarctica, During the Last Glacial Maximum and Termination", Electronic Theses and Dissertations. 3318.
- Walther, Tess; Hall, Brenda; Denton, George; Hendy, Chris (2023), "Glacial history of Pyramid Trough, southern McMurdo Sound, Antarctica: Constraints on Koettlitz Glacier during the last glacial maximum and termination", Quaternary Science Advances, 11, doi:10.1016/j.qsa.2023.100089, ISSN 2666-0334
- Wright, Anne C. (September 1980), "Landforms of McMurdo Volcanic Group, Southern Foothills of Royal Society Range, Antarctica", New Zealand Journal of Geology and Geophysics, 23 (5–6): 605–613, Bibcode:1980NZJGG..23..605W, doi:10.1080/00288306.1980.10424132
- This article incorporates public domain material from websites or documents of the United States Geological Survey.
