= McMurdo Station =

American Antarctic base

- Antarctic base
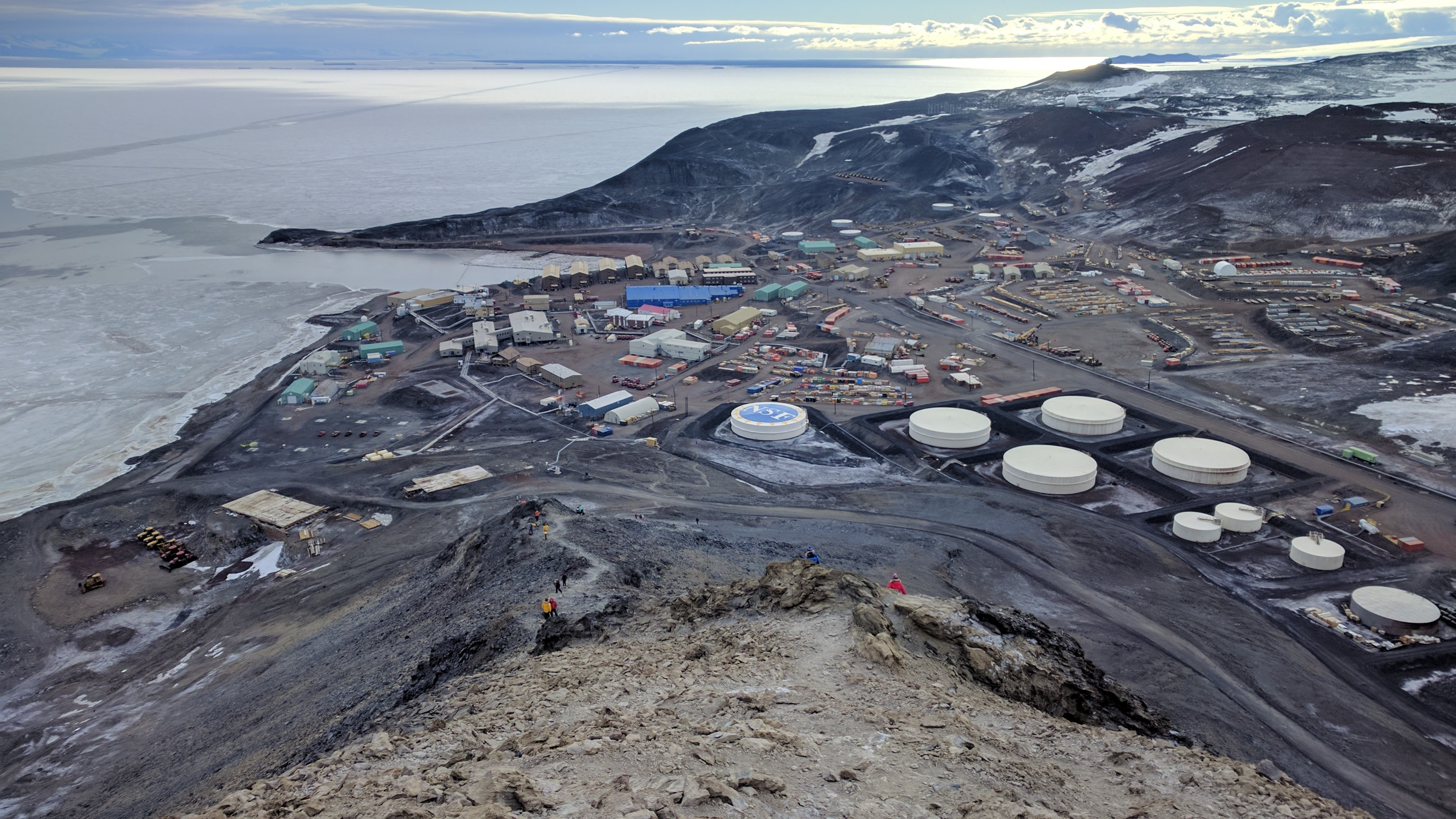
- McMurdo Station in February 2017

- Flag Logo of the USAP
- Nicknames: Mactown, MCM
- Location of McMurdo Station in Antarctica
- Coordinates: 77°50′47″S 166°40′06″E
- Country: United States
- Location in Antarctica: Ross Island, Ross Dependency; claimed by New Zealand (In abeyance since 1961)
- Governing Treaty: Antarctic Treaty System (1961- present )
- Administered by: United States Antarctic Program of the National Science Foundation
- Established: 16 February 1956; 70 years ago
- Named for: McMurdo Sound
- Elevation: 10 m (33 ft)

Population (2017)
  - Density: 462/km^{2} (1,200/sq mi)
  - Summer: 1,000
  - Winter: 153
- Winter: ~April to ~September
- Time zone: UTC+12 (NZST)
  - Summer (DST): UTC+13 (NZDT)
- APO AP: 96599-9998
- UN/LOCODE: AQ MCM
- Type: All year-round
- Period: Annual
- Status: Operational
- Activities: List: Aeronomy; Astrophysics; Biology; Geophysics; Glacial geology; Ocean and climate systems
- Facilities: List: A harbor; Landing strips; Helicopter pad; Repair facilities; Dormitories; Administrative buildings; Firehouse; Power plant; Water distillation plant; Wharf; Stores; Clubs; Warehouses; Above-ground water, sewer, telephone, and power lines; Chapel of the Snows Interfaith Chapel; Albert P. Crary Science and Engineering Center; More than 85 buildings
- Website: www.nsf.gov
- Night and Day is seasonal, see Polar Night

McMurdo Station is an American Antarctic research station on the southern tip of Ross Island. It is operated by the United States through the United States Antarctic Program (USAP), a branch of the National Science Foundation (NSF). The station is the largest community in Antarctica, capable of supporting up to 1,200 residents, though the population fluctuates seasonally; during the Antarctic night, there are fewer than two hundred people. It serves as one of three year-round United States Antarctic science facilities. Personnel and cargo going to or coming from Amundsen–Scott South Pole Station usually first pass through McMurdo, either by flight or by the McMurdo to South Pole Traverse; it is a hub for activities and science projects in Antarctica. McMurdo, Amundsen-Scott, and Palmer are the three non-seasonal United States stations on the continent, though by the Antarctic Treaty System the bases are not a legal claim (though the right is not forfeited); they are dedicated to scientific research. New Zealand's Scott Base is nearby on Hut Point Peninsula, as is Arrival Heights Laboratory. On the base is a heliport, and across the channel is a helicopter refueling station at Marble Point, but the main airfields in the 2020s are Phoenix Airfield and Williams Field which are to the south and built on ice. Winter Quarters Bay is the base seaport, though access can be limited by weather conditions when the sea ice forms. Weather can make it too hard to land aircraft, and an icebreaker may be needed to reach the port facility. However, the sea ice also makes it possible to make ice traverses and travel directly across the bay, and historically an Ice Runway was crafted. The base is powered by a mixture of generators and wind power, though it had a nuclear reactor in the 1960s.

The base was first established in the mid-1950s as part of an international program to study and explore Antarctica for peaceful purposes. Daylight is seasonal at McMurdo, corresponding to the south polar summer, and the polar night, which is also winter, lasts from about April to September. As it warms, the sea ice melts, and the port is opened, but by about February, much of the activity drops with plunging temperatures and increasing darkness, and there are usually no flights in or out until July or August.

The base has many buildings and staff which support the local population and its many field stations and research projects. The base is the starting point for the South Pole Traverse snow and ice road, which must be cleared each year, as do the snow and ice runways. The base is distant from New Zealand, about the same distance as between New York and Los Angeles, or as between Los Angeles and Hawaii. Some of the projects and/or field stations McMurdo Station has supported include the Lower Erebus Hut, for the study of Mount Erebus (an active volcano to the north of the base), WAIS Divide Camp (an ice coring project), ANDRILL (ANtarctic DRILLing Project), ANSMET (meteorite collection), and the Long Duration Balloon site. Telecommunication sites include Ross Island Earth Station, Black Island Earth Station, and the NASA Ground Station. The Amundsen–Scott South Pole Station is supported primarily through the McMurdo Station, and resources to many international camps also come through McMurdo and its facilities.

== History ==
McMurdo started in December 1955, and was established in 1956 as a Naval Air Station in support of the International Geophysical Year, then as a science and logistics base in line with the international Antarctic treaty. Each year there are changes at the base, but the overall rhythm of the base has remained. Supplies and people flow in by ship and air for the austral summer, and for a few months there is a frenzy of activities, research, and resources flow out to many field stations and bases in Antarctica. In a few months people depart as the temperature plunges and worsening weather conditions, and much smaller staff over-winter at the base. Originally a Naval base, the role of the NSF and contractors increased and by 1993 the USN had departed. The NSF collaborates with other agencies including the U.S. Coast Guard, US Air Force, New Zealand Air Force, and NASA, as well as many academic institutions.

=== Name ===
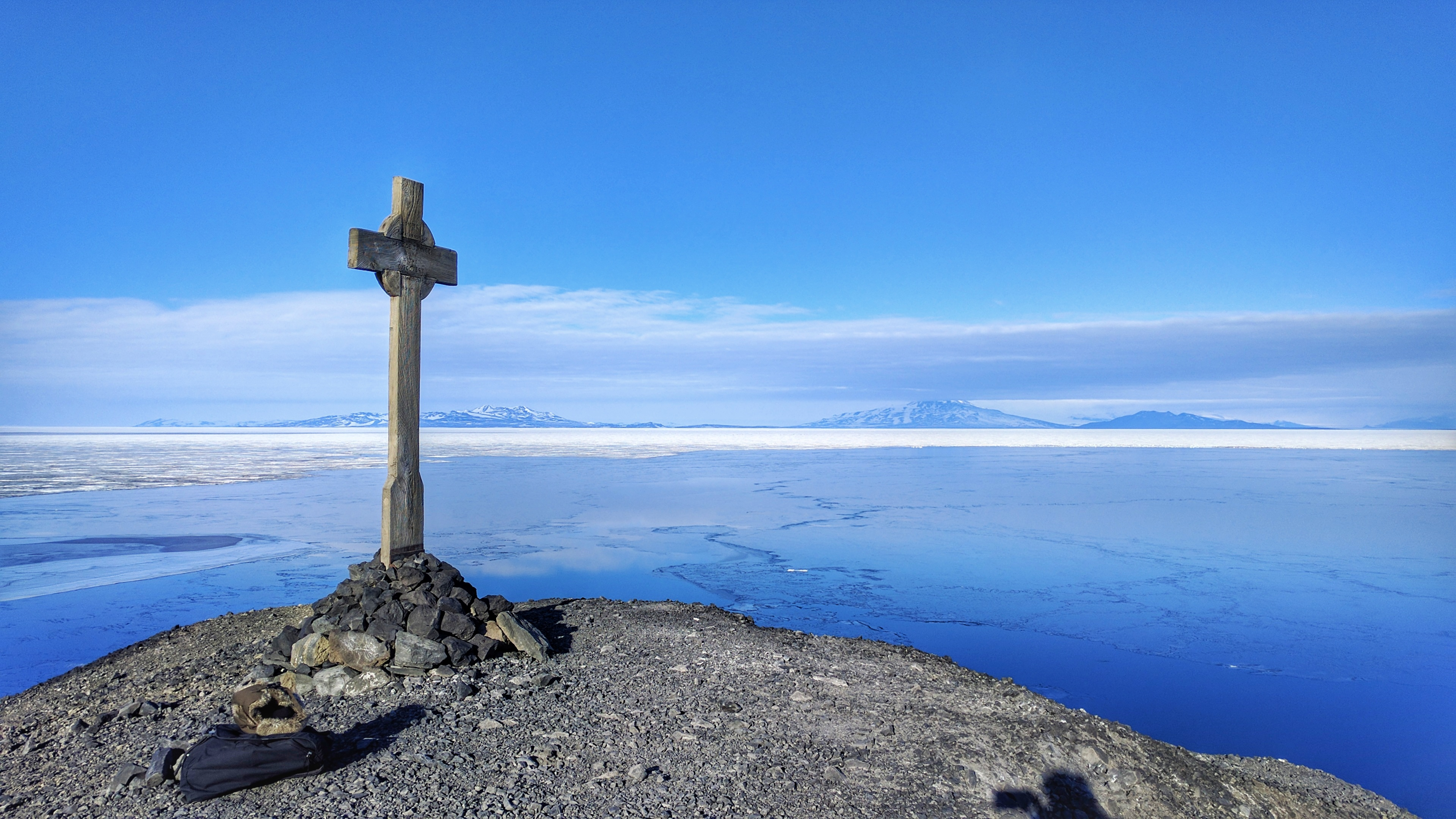
Memorial to George Vince at Hut Point, who died in 1904 on the Robert Falcon Scott expedition

The station takes its name from its geographic location on McMurdo Sound, named after Lieutenant Archibald McMurdo of British ship HMS Terror. The Terror, commanded by Irish explorer Francis Crozier, along with expedition flagship Erebus under command of English Explorer James Clark Ross, first charted the area in 1841. The British explorer Robert Falcon Scott established a base camp close to this spot in 1902 and built a cabin there that was named Discovery Hut. It still stands as a historic monument near the water's edge on Hut Point at McMurdo Station. The volcanic rock of the site is the southernmost bare ground accessible by ship in the world. The United States officially opened its first station at McMurdo on February 16, 1956, as part of Operation Deep Freeze. The base, built by the U.S. Navy Seabees, was initially designated Naval Air Facility McMurdo. On November 28, 1957, Admiral George J. Dufek visited McMurdo with a U.S. congressional delegation for a change-of-command ceremony.

In 1961, it was renamed from Naval Air Facility McMurdo, to just McMurdo. The Navy would be involved until 1993, when it left McMurdo in the hands of the NSF. The NSF had been involved over the decades and took on greater responsibilities over the years.

=== International Geophysical Year ===
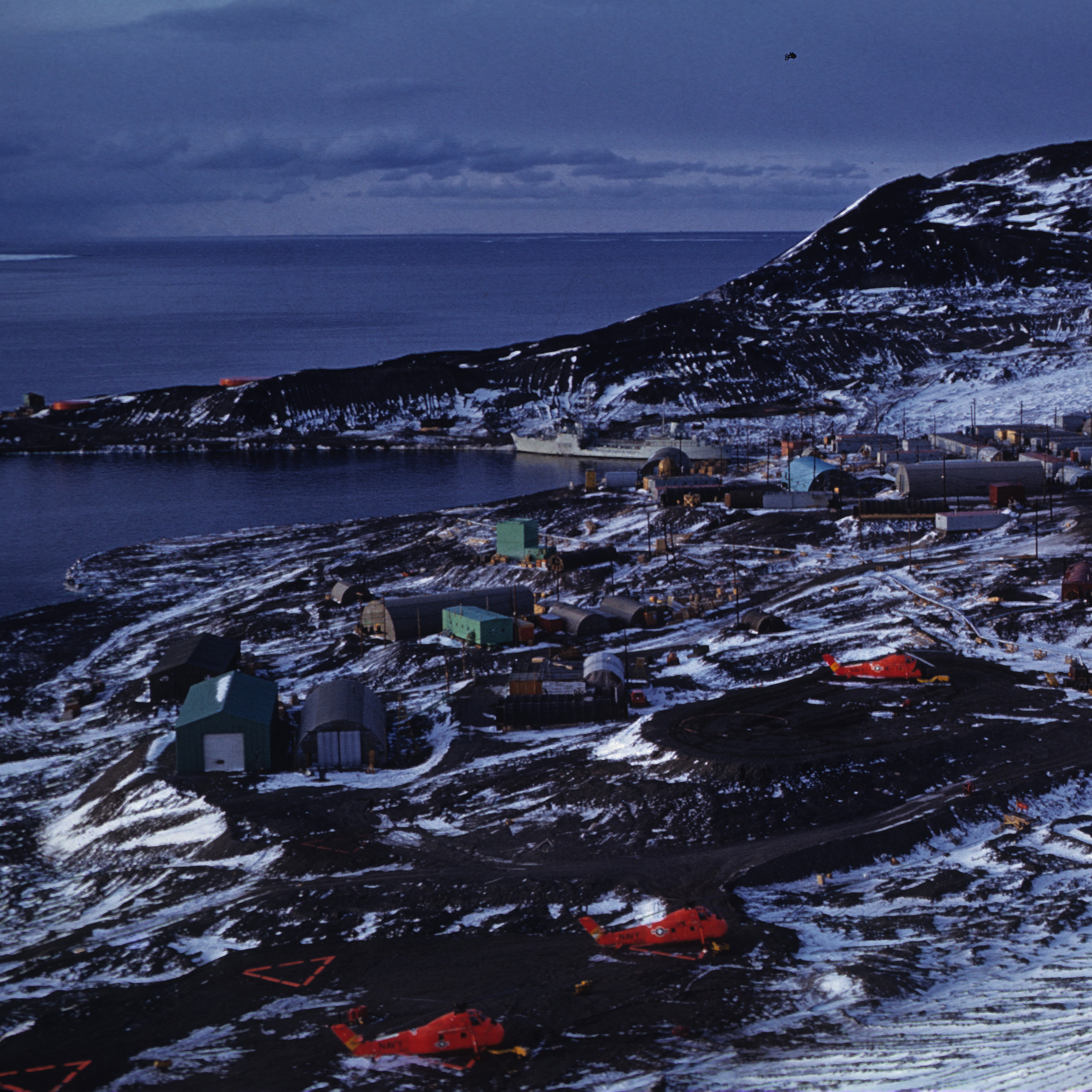
McMurdo in 1964

McMurdo Station was the center of United States logistical operations during the International Geophysical Year, an international scientific effort that lasted from July 1, 1957, to December 31, 1958. After the IGY, it became the center for US scientific as well as logistical activities in Antarctica. The IGY was an international project in the late 1950s by 67 countries and involved over 4,000 research stations Globally.

McMurdo was one of seven bases that the United States built for the IGY, which also included Hallett, Wilkes, Admundsen-Scott, Ellsworth, Byrd, and Little America. Of these only McMurdo and Admundsen-Scott are still operated in the early 21st century.

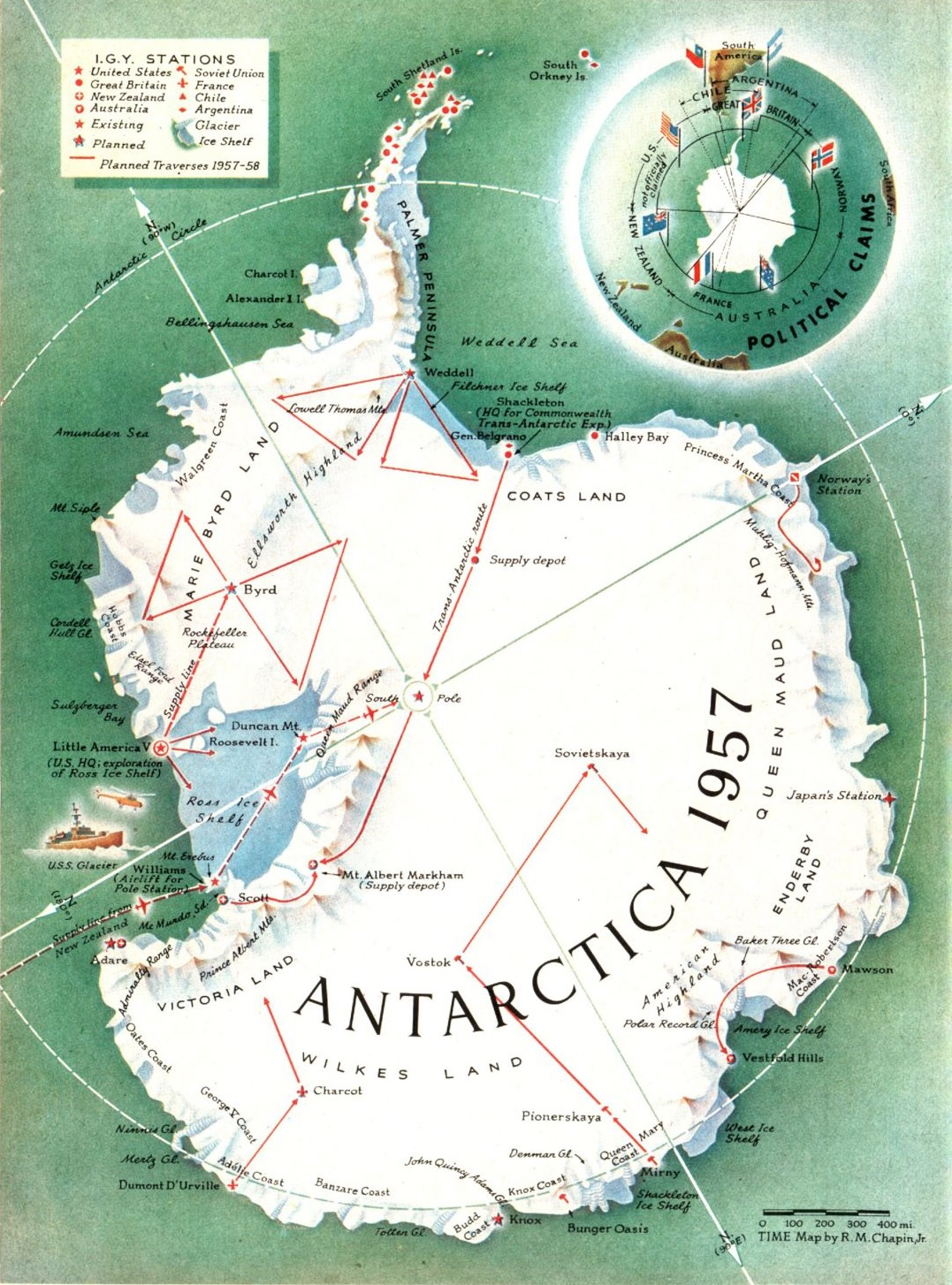
IGY Antarctica infographic circa 1957, highlighting international missions

As part of this endeavour, New Zealand also built a base on Ross Island, Scott Base, which has gone on to conduct many scientific projects. Scott Base is still in operation, but a second year-round New Zealand base, Vanda Station, built later on the Antarctic mainland, has since closed; it still has a weather station and is visited seasonally. Also, Hallet Station was a joint base of New Zealand and the US, which was operated until 1973.

=== Antarctica Treaty ===
The Antarctic Treaty, subsequently signed by dozens of governments, regulates intergovernmental relations with respect to Antarctica and governs the conduct of daily life at McMurdo for United States Antarctic Program (USAP) participants. The Antarctic Treaty and related agreements, collectively called the Antarctic Treaty System (ATS), opened for signature on December 1, 1959, and officially entered into force on June 23, 1961.

On the heels of the success of the IGY, the treaty was developed with three major points, to continue Antarctica's legal status, to use it for scientific purposes, and for peaceful purposes.

=== 1960s and 70s ===
In 1960, one of the longest-running science experiments at McMurdo was established, the CosRay detector. This detected energetic particles from the Sun, and would operate until 2016 when it was moved to the nearby Jang Bogo station.

In 1961 the Antarctic Treaty System entered into force and the base was renamed McMurdo Station.

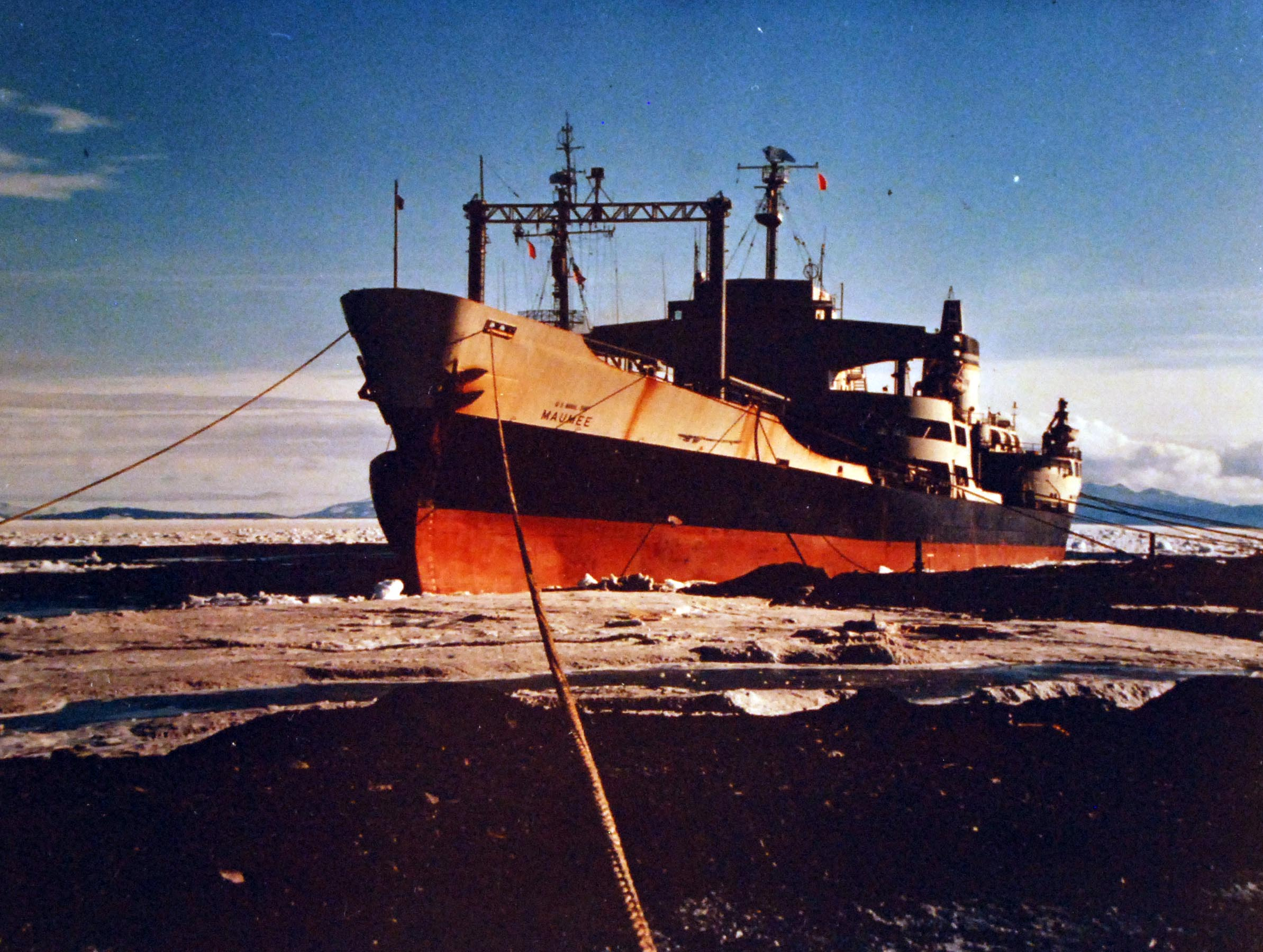
Cargo ship USNS Maumee moored at McMurdo's ice pier, January 1974

The first scientific diving protocols were established before 1960 and the first diving operations were documented in November 1961.

From 1961 to 1972, McMurdo Station relied on a small PM-3A nuclear reactor for power, which also provided heat for a desalination plant that produced fresh water from seawater. The reactor-powered plant could generate approximately 14,000 gallons of water per day. The reactor could produce 1.8 megawatts of power and would enable a reduction in fuel oil shipments. In the 1950s, fuel oil was about half the weight of all cargo going to Antarctica, and there was other expected benefits. The oil heaters being used to heat buildings were a fire safety hazard, and there was a demand for reliable power over the dark winter months when the station could not be resupplied.

The nuclear plant was brought to the base in December 1961, and produced electricity on July 10, 1962. The reactor was modular, and could be broken into sections small enough for a C-130 even though it was brought to McMurdo by ship. The reactor proved expensive to operate, and was turned off over concerns of stress corrosion.

In 1973 the Thiel Earth Science Laboratory (TESL) was dedicated, named after the geologist Edward Thiel. He died in 1961 in a plane that crashed trying to take off from Wilkes Station. The Thiel Laboratory later became office for Field Training Safety in the 1990s, after its work moved to the Crary lab.

Between 1962 and 1963, 28 Arcas sounding rockets were launched from McMurdo Station, collecting the first measurements above radiosonde levels of altitude in Antarctica

In 1967, the first Winter fly-in (WinFly) took place in June and August, providing a supply and personnel relief for those overwintering at McMurdo, reducing the duration of their isolation to about 4–5 months. This marked the first phase of Operation Deep Freeze, aimed at resupplying McMurdo and supporting the busy austral summer season.

In 1974, Mary Alice McWhinnie and Mary Odile Cahoon became the first women to winter over at McMurdo Station, staying from April through October of that year. In 1962 McWhinnie became the first female in the Antarctic Research Program.

=== 1980s ===
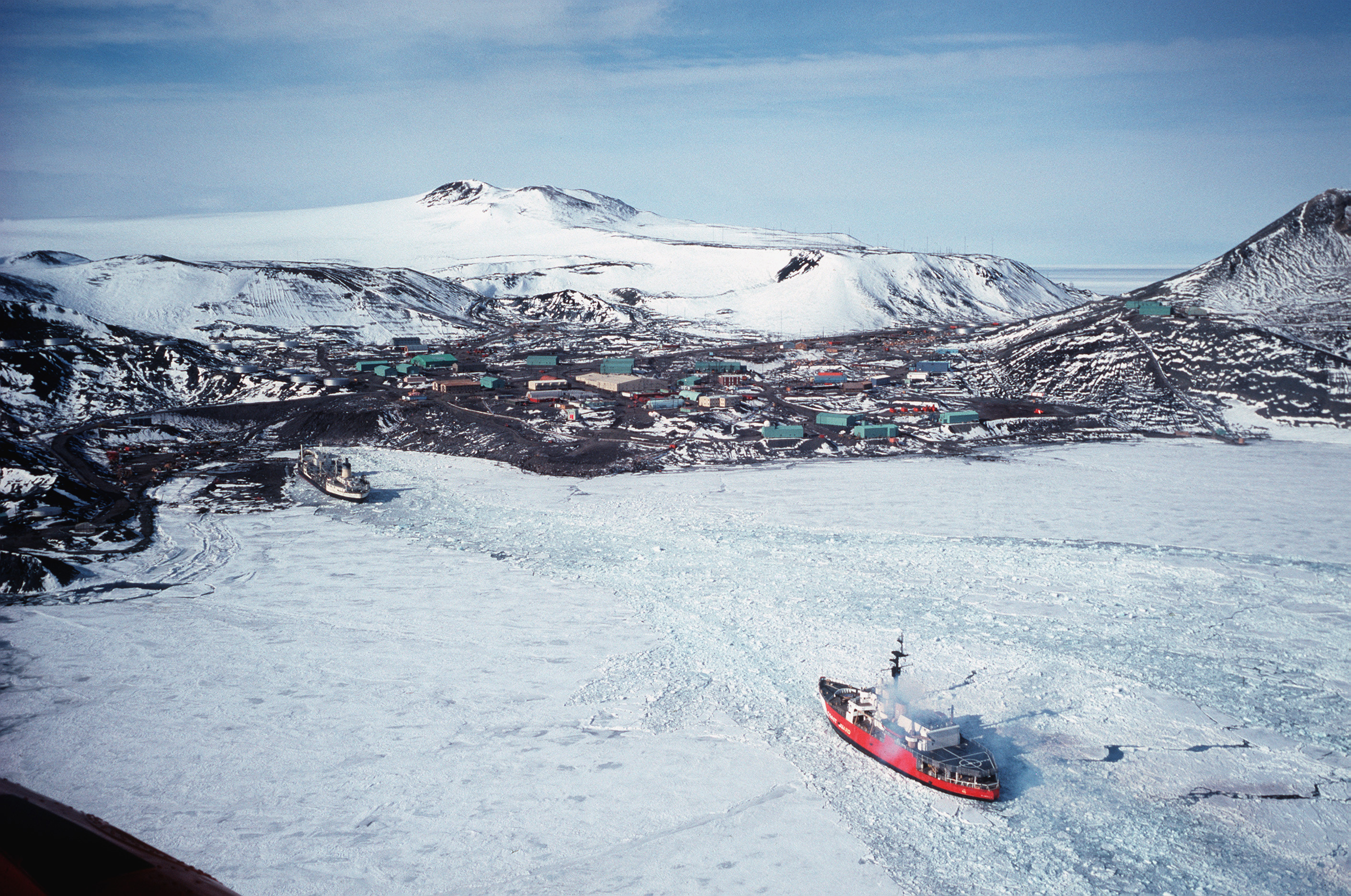
Icebreaker USCGC Glacier (WAGB 4) clears a channel to McMurdo in the early 1980s

In 1982 new generators were installed; this included six diesel generators that could produce 900 kilowatts each, though the number used depends on base population. It also powers the desalination plant and waste heat, heats the buildings at McMurdo.

In the late 1980s, construction started on what would be the new Crary science laboratory, a larger and connected facility that would replace some of the older labs.

In 1989, a Greenhouse for McMurdo was built, which could supply a limited supply of fresh greens year round. A new chapel was dedicated in 1989 after the previous had burned down in 1978. A temporary chapel in a quonset hut was used in the interim, though that also burned later in 1991. During this period, a number of social establishments were open, many of which were organized according to military rank. While civilians were permitted to enter any of these venues, access for military personnel was typically segregated by rank.

In the 1988-89 season a hovercraft was tested. These hovercraft could traverse over land, ice, water, and melting sea ice mixture. The design was relatively easy to use, and the McMurdo kitchen staff were test drivers after some training.

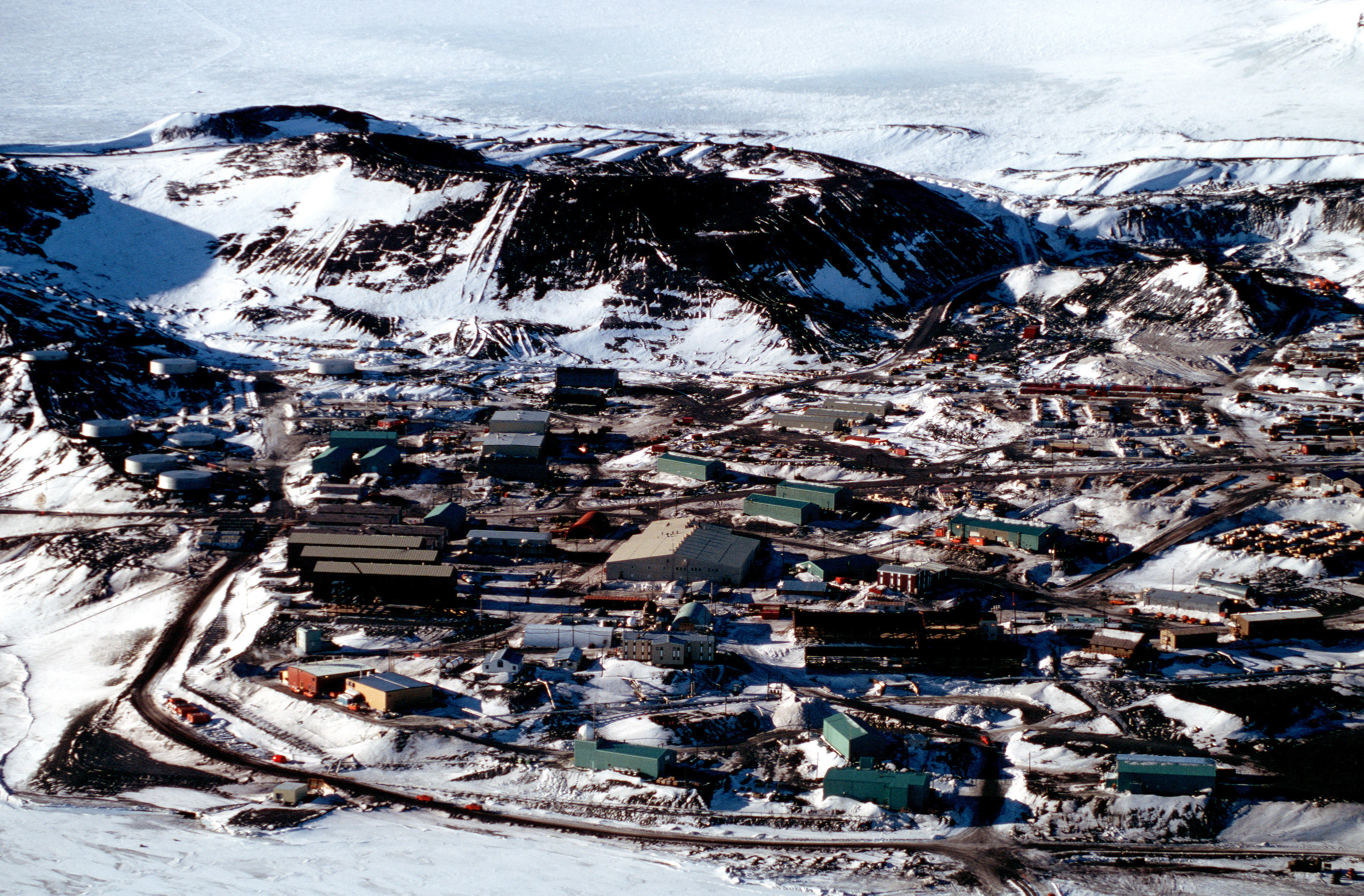
McMurdo in September 1989

=== 1990s ===
The 1990s marked a period of transition for McMurdo Station, highlighted by the withdrawal of the United States Navy, which had played a central role in the station's governance and operations since its founding. Over the preceding decades, the National Science Foundation (NSF) had gradually assumed greater responsibility and was ultimately designated as the lead agency. The NSF continued to coordinate with other entities, including the United States Coast Guard, the Air Force, NASA, and various civilian contractors.

In 1990, one area of study was the ozone layer. In particular, there was concern over ozone depletion, and measurements of this layer were taken in 1990 from McMurdo.

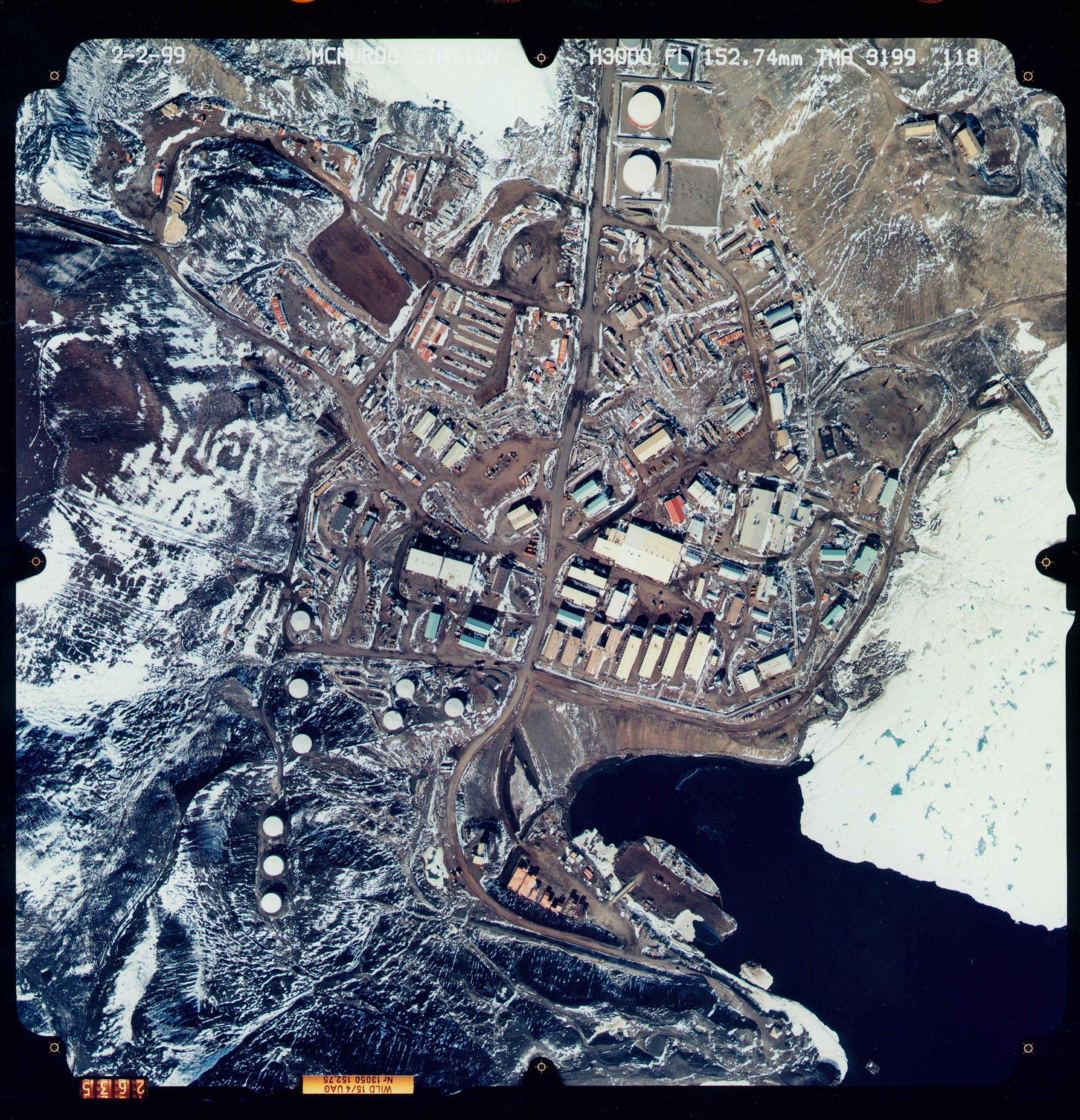
McMurdo Station, 1999

In December 1991, the new Crary lab, named for Albert P. Crary, was dedicated, replacing the older Thiel Earth Science Laboratory and the Eklund Biological Center.

The McMurdo greenhouse was expanded with a glasshouse expansion in 1994. A Foremost Terra bus was delivered the same year, and served until 2025; the bus could haul 56 passengers and was dubbed Ivan the Terra.

In 1995, the McMurdo Ground Station came online, which was a collaboration between NASA and the NSF; it is a communication facility with a 10-meter S and X Band antenna in polygonal dome overlooking the base. It has supported communication with satellites such as for radar mapping Antarctica and TDRSS. In 1996, the NASA Long Duration Balloon facility, a McMurdo Field Station, was established.

In 1999 the Navy conducted its final flight out from McMurdo to New Zealand, marking the end of a 44-year chapter of Naval aviation from McMurdo Station.

==== 1998 Protocol on Environmental Protection ====
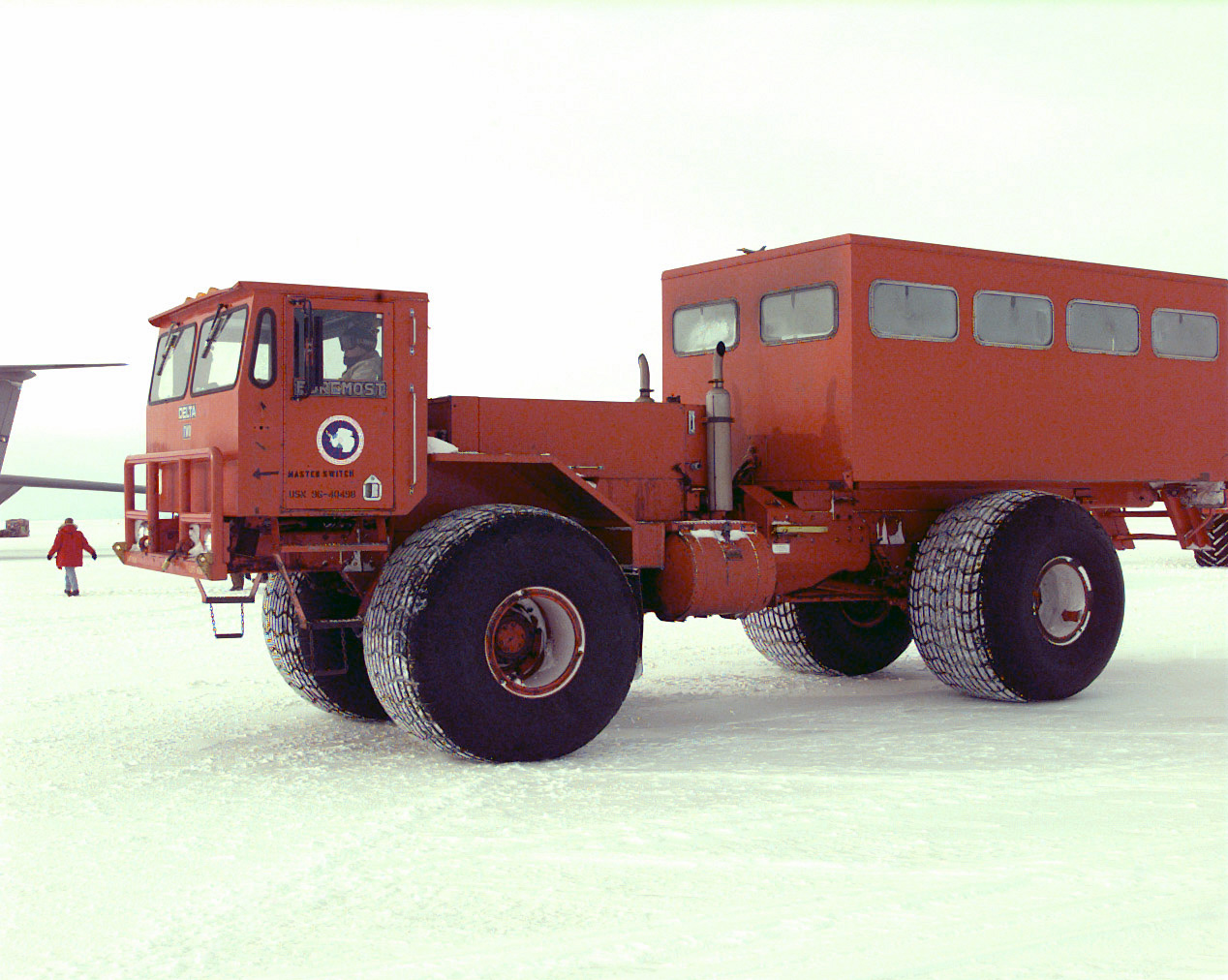
Foremost Delta 2 in 1998

McMurdo Station has attempted to improve environmental management and waste removal in order to adhere to the Protocol on Environmental Protection to the Antarctic Treaty, signed on October 4, 1991, which entered into force on January 14, 1998. This agreement prevents development and provides for the protection of the Antarctic environment through five specific annexes on marine pollution, fauna and flora, environmental impact assessments, waste management, and protected areas. It prohibits all activities relating to mineral resources except scientific ones. A new waste-treatment facility was built at McMurdo in 2003.

McMurdo Station stands about two miles (3 km) from Scott Base, the New Zealand science station, and all of Ross Island lies within a sector claimed by New Zealand. Criticism has been leveled at the base regarding its construction projects, particularly the McMurdo-(Amundsen-Scott) South Pole highway.

=== Scientific diving operations ===
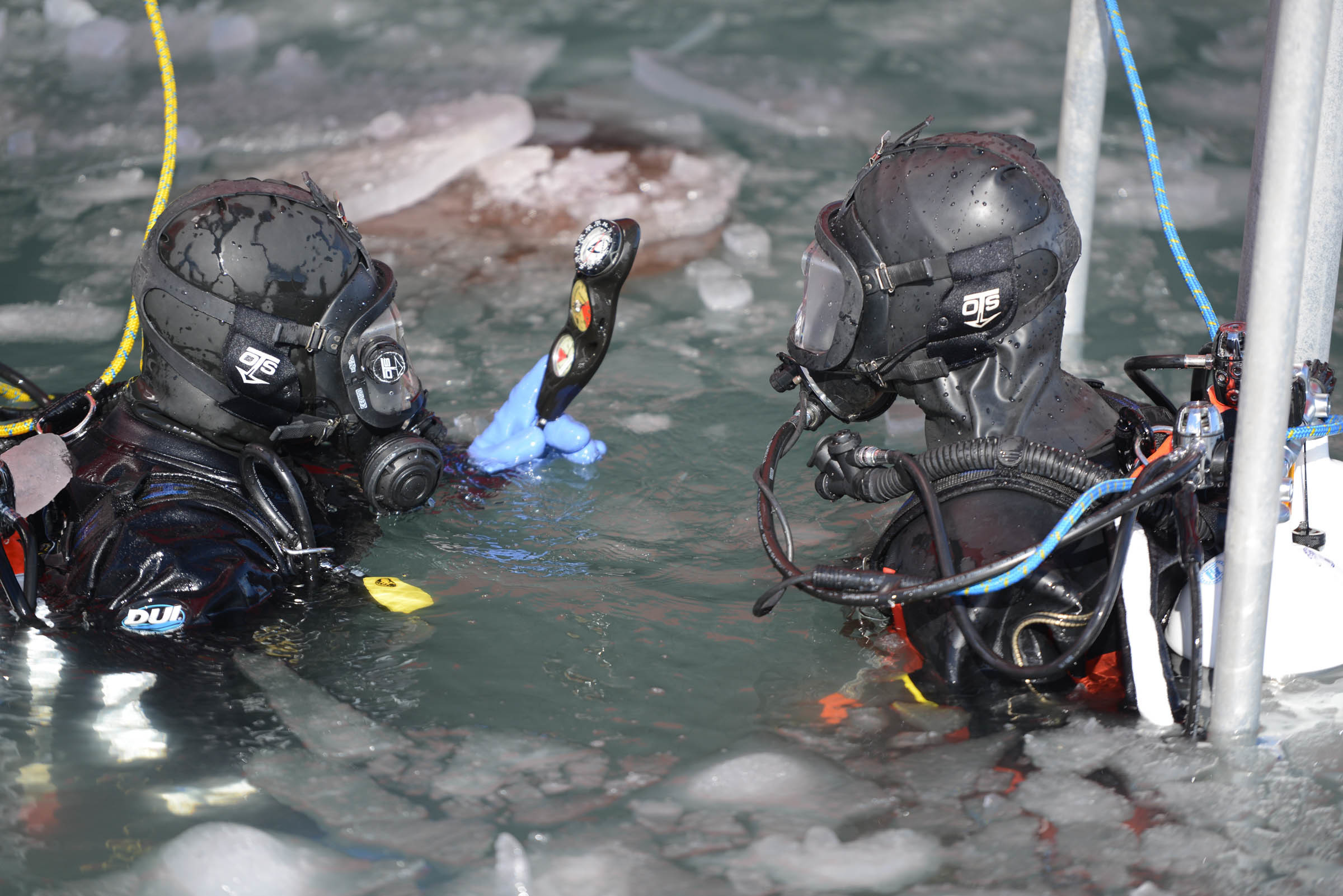
Two divers from U.S. Coast Guard Cutter Polar Star in the water off McMurdo, 2017

Scientific diving operations continue with 10,859 dives having been conducted under the ice from 1989 to 2006. A hyperbaric chamber is available for support of polar diving operations.

=== 21st century ===
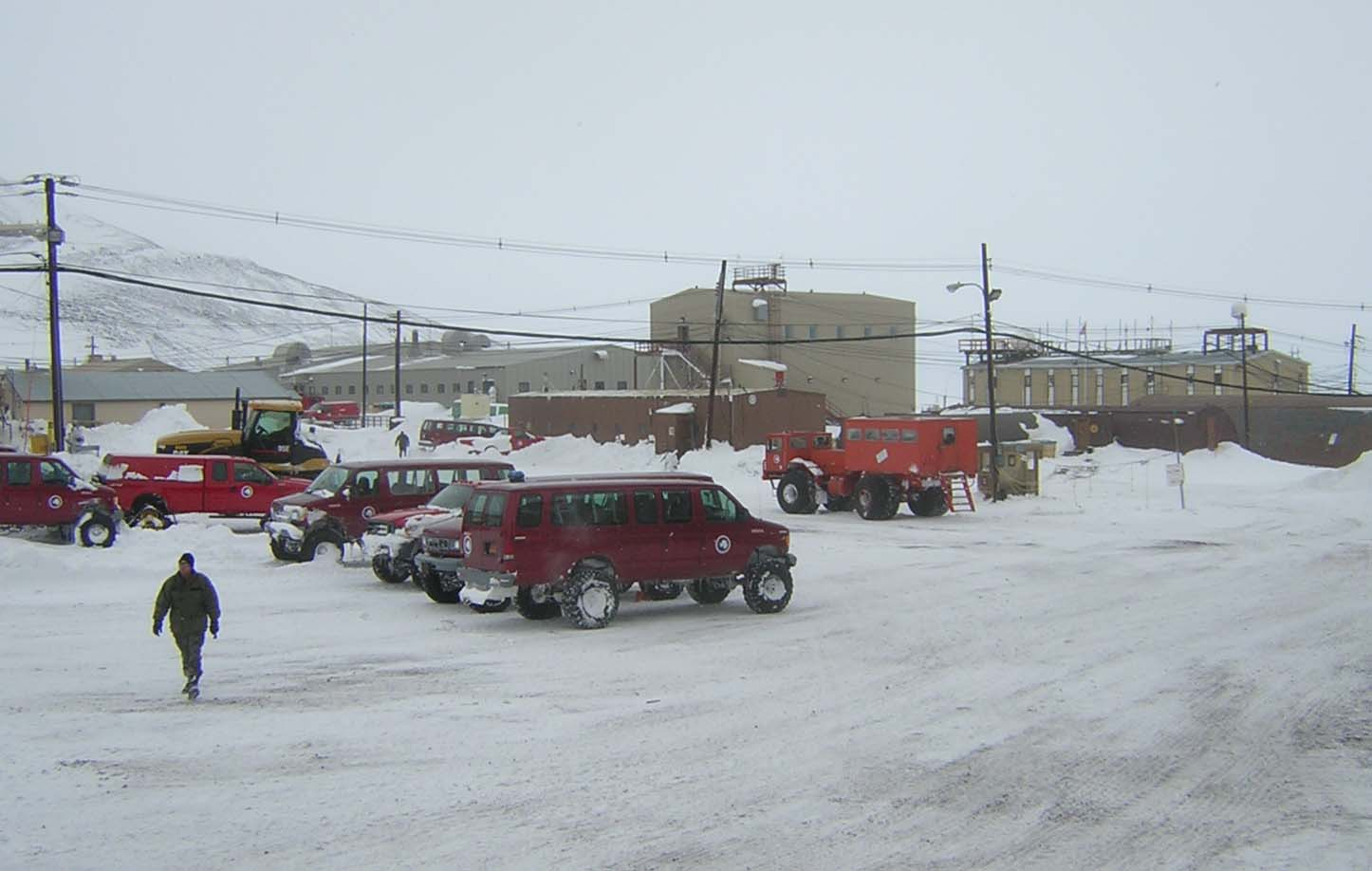
McMurdo Station in November 2003

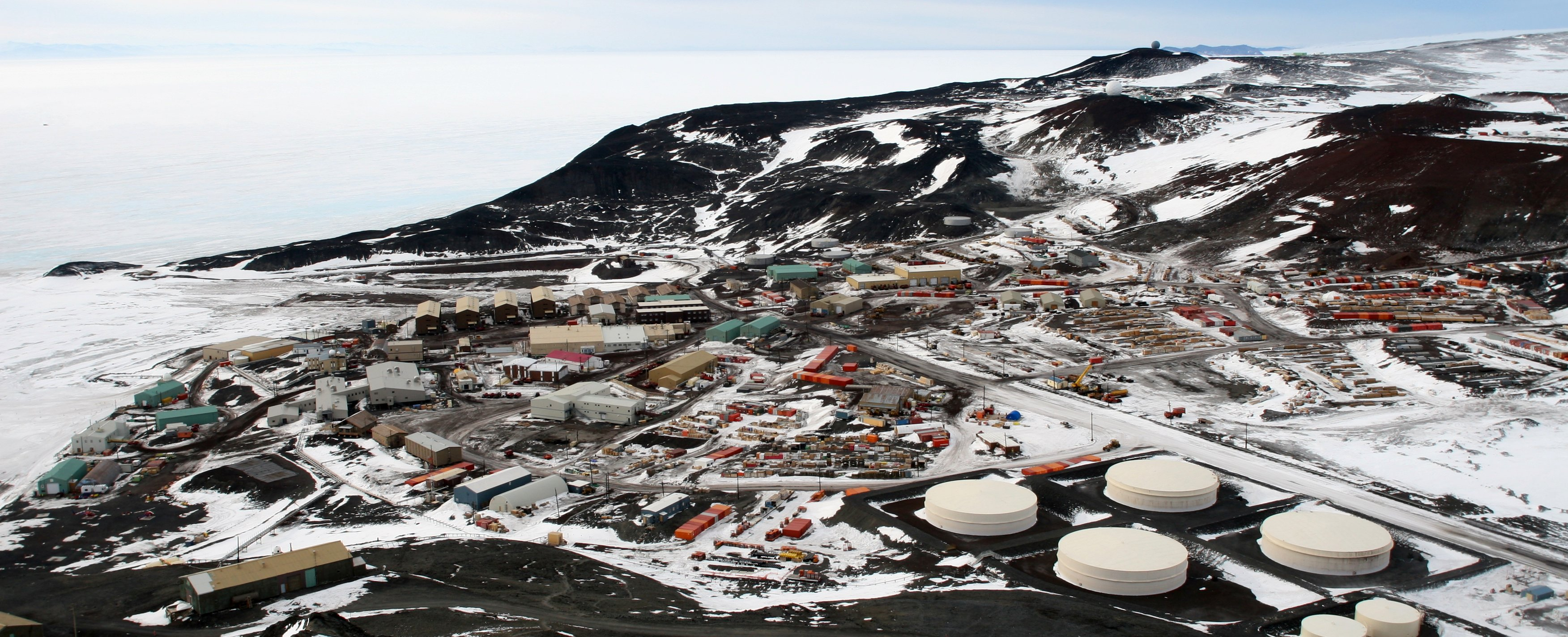
McMurdo Station from Observation Hill, 2006

On 24 November 2003, McMurdo Station had a total solar eclipse, which the inhabitants were able to observe.

As of 2007, McMurdo Station was Antarctica's largest community and a functional, modern-day science station, including a harbor, three airfields (two seasonal), a heliport and more than 100 buildings.

McMurdo Station briefly gained global notice when an anti-war protest took place on February 15, 2003. During the rally, about 50 scientists and station personnel gathered to protest against the coming invasion of Iraq by the United States. McMurdo Station was the only Antarctic location to hold such a rally.

A snow and road traverse from McMurdo to the South Pole was constructed between 2002 and end of 2005, when it opened for the first time; it has gained several names and has been called the southernmost road in the world. Although the South Pole base is about a three-hour flight by LC-130 from McMurdo, the overland traverse allows massive amounts of cargo including 75,000 US gallons (280,000 L) of fuel and 20,000 pounds (9,100 kg) of cargo each year to be transported out of McMurdo.

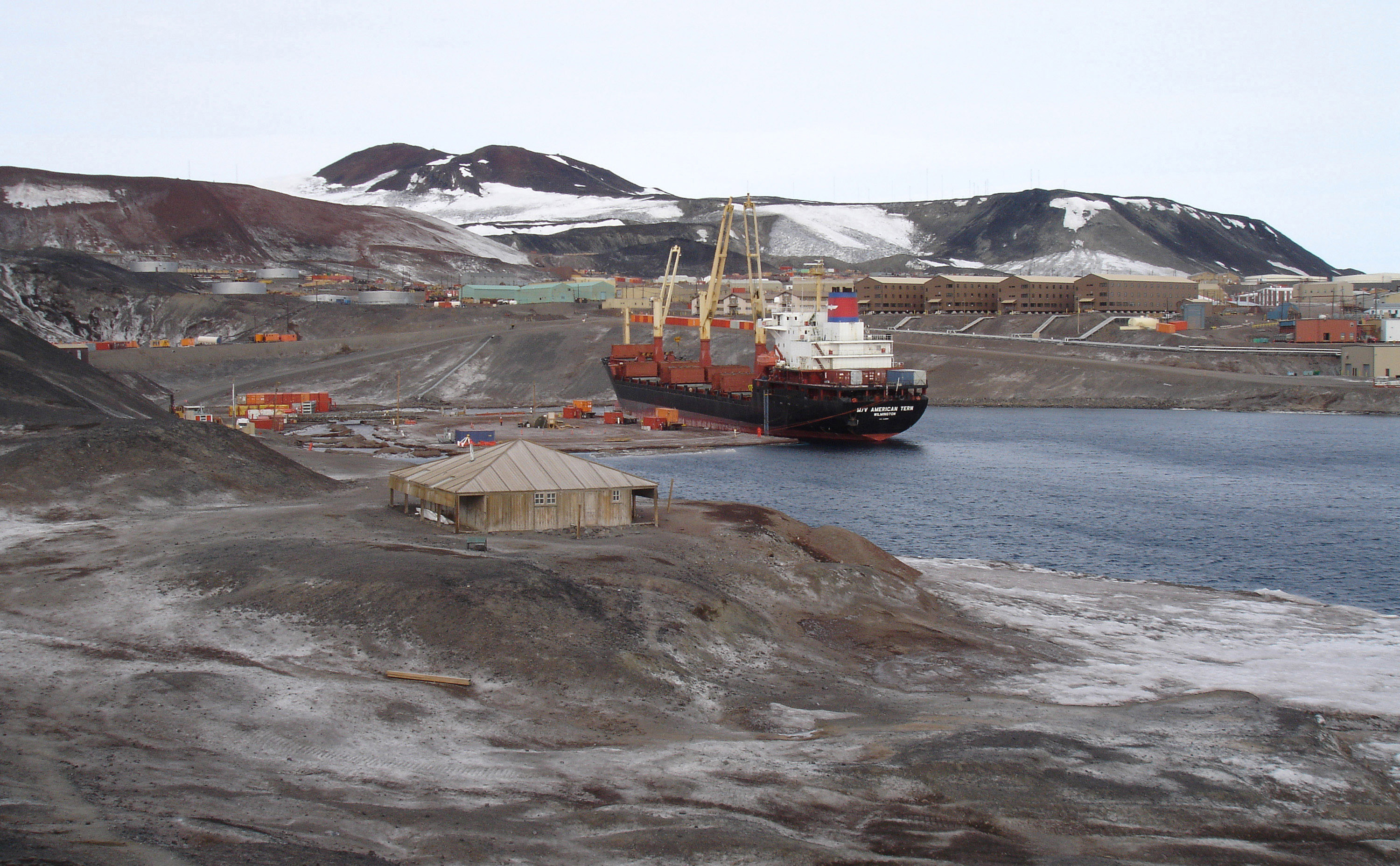
Discovery Hut (1902) at Hut Point Peninsula of Ross Island, Antarctica. McMurdo Station lies in the background during cargo operations of the supply ship MV American Tern of Operation Deep Freeze 2007.

In 2008, NASA tested an inflatable lunar habitat at McMurdo station.

Scientists and other personnel at McMurdo are participants in the USAP, which coordinates research and operational support in the region. Werner Herzog's 2007 documentary Encounters at the End of the World reports on the life and culture of McMurdo Station from the point-of-view of residents. Anthony Powell's 2013 documentary Antarctica: A Year on Ice provides time-lapse photography of Antarctica intertwined with personal accounts from residents of McMurdo Station and of the adjacent Scott Base over the course of a year.

An annual sealift by cargo ships as part of Operation Deep Freeze delivers 8 million U.S. gallons (42 million liters) of fuel and 11 million pounds (5 million kg) of supplies and equipment for McMurdo residents. The ships, operated by the U.S. Military Sealift Command, are crewed by civilian mariners. Cargo may range from mail, construction materials, trucks, tractors, dry and frozen food, to scientific instruments.

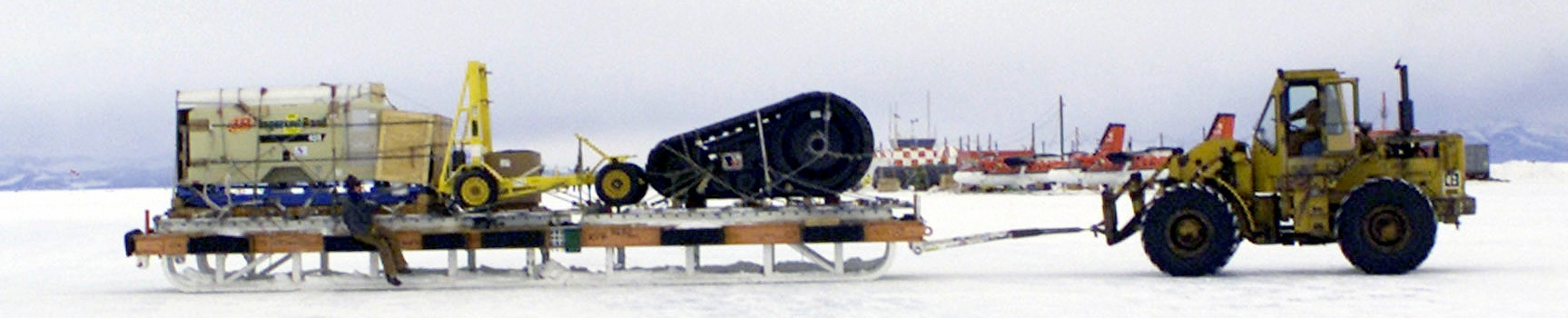
A 10K-AT "All Terrain" forklift moves a loaded cargo-sled as part of an Operation Deep Freeze resupply mission. 2007

==== 2010s ====
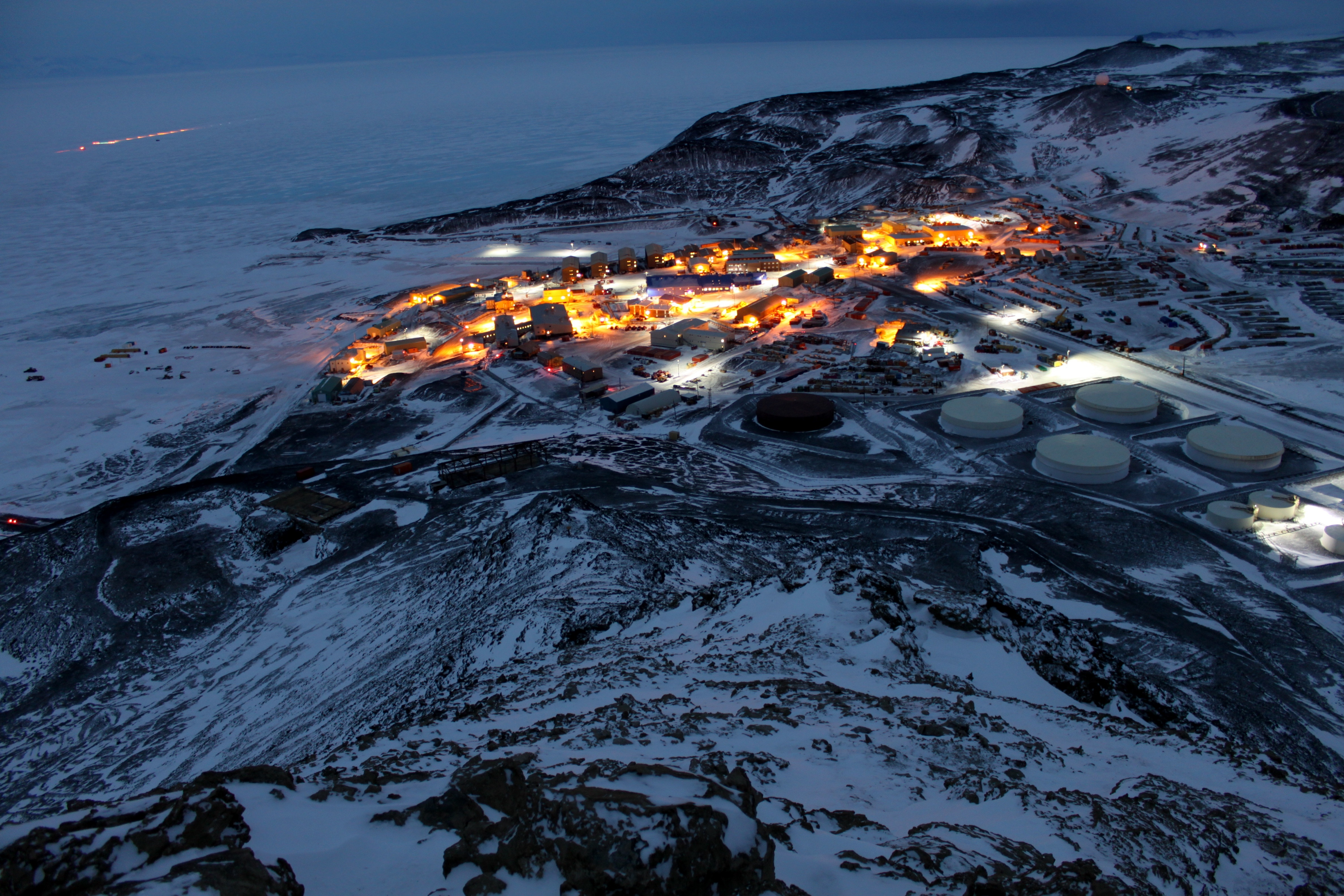
McMurdo at night in October, about the time the seasons switched from all-day darkness to all-day light

In 2011 the McMurdo Station greenhouse was demolished, which was the largest in Antarctica up to that time.

In the late 2010s, there was a transition from Pegasus Airfield to Phoenix Airfield. Phoenix Airfield underwent operational testing and received its first wheeled landings during the 2016-17 austral summer season. Pegasus Airfield closed after the last flight on 8 December 2016. Phoenix Airfield was opened in early 2017. Also, a new compressed snow "Alpha" runway was built at Williams field.

In 2017, the McMurdo Oceanographic Observatory (MOO) was installed underwater and removed in 2019; it provided underwater data and video from under the ice.

==== 2020s ====
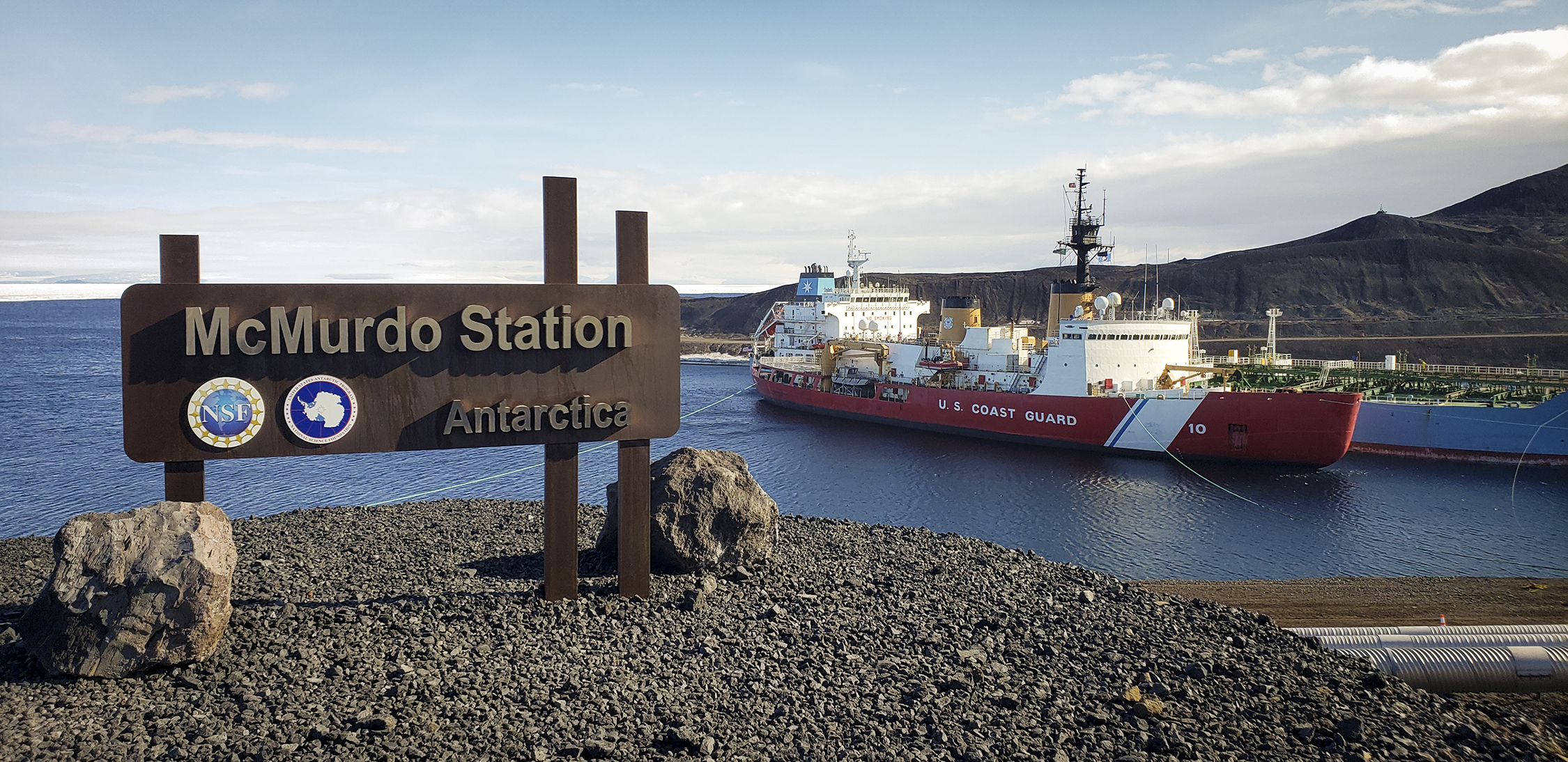
McMurdo sign with Ice Breaker Polar Star at the wharf, 2020

In 2020, one dormitory was demolished as part of a plan to rebuild several parts of station. A new dorm is under construction and is expected to be finished by March 2026. In the 2023–4 season, 67 of 137 projects were cut or scaled back due to housing issues. In 2023, the NIH sent investigators to McMurdo in response to reports of sexual harassment and/or assault by men and women at the station. One result of this was to ban the selling of alcohol at bars, though there is not a blanket ban on alcohol at the station.

The first confirmed case of Covid at McMurdo was detected in August 2022. By November, 10% of the population of the station was confirmed to be infected. As of February 2023, a total of 175 positive cases have been detected. Covid also reached Amundsen-Scott South Pole Station and WAIS Divide field camp (see also COVID-19 pandemic in Antarctica).

In 2022 the Ross Island Earth Station (RIES) satellite telecommunications center was completed near McMurdo Station, which supports satellite communications for the base.

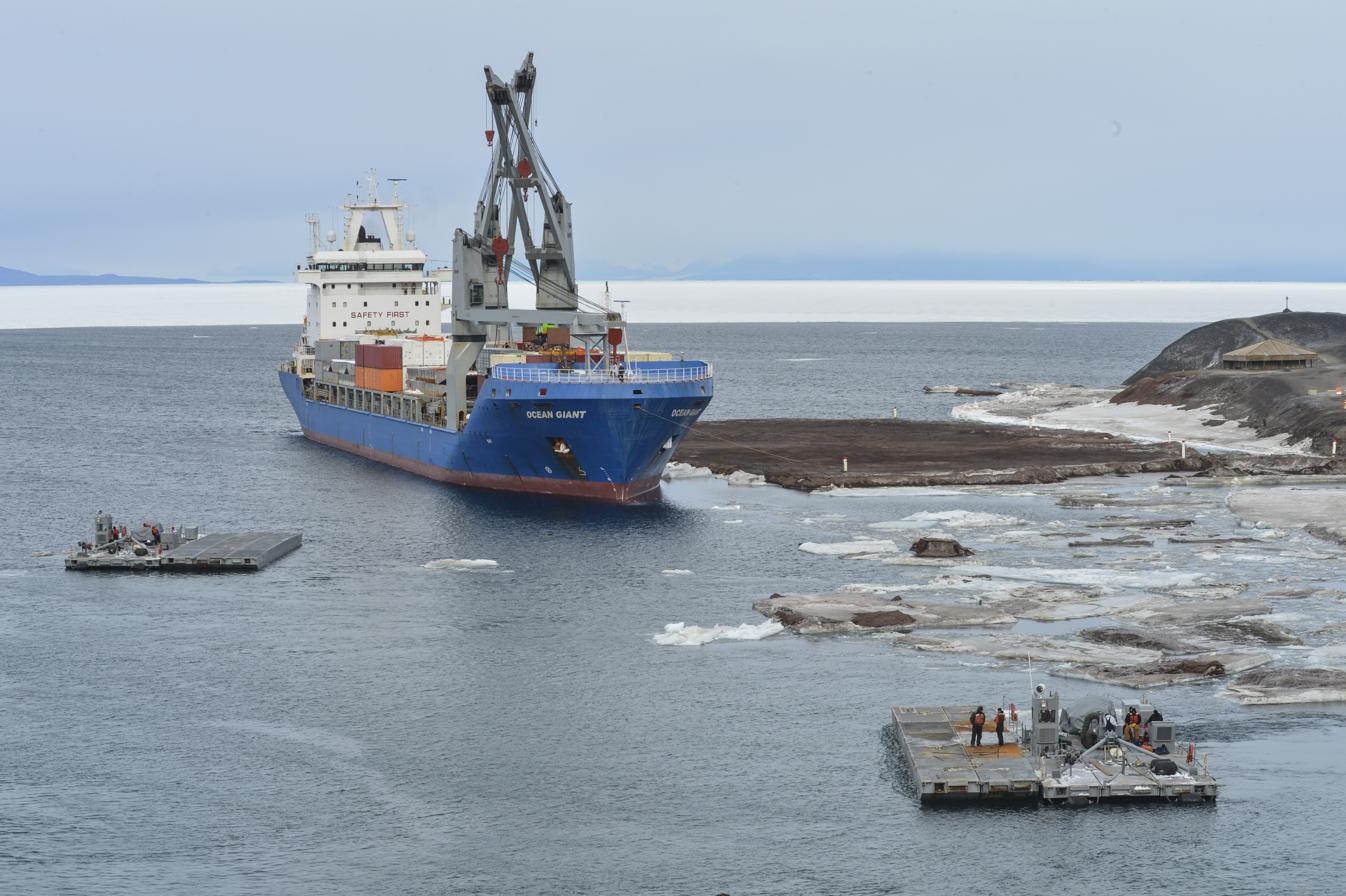
Ocean Giant bringing supplies in January 2023

For Operation Deep Freeze 2025, the ship Ocean Giant brought supplies to McMurdo Station for the 2024–2025 season, arriving in late January 2025. For this year the Marine Causeway System, rather than an ice pier, was used. The Marine Causeway consists of floating modular sections that when assembled allow the cargo to be offloaded. Ocean Giant was then loaded with trash and material for recycling, and departed, and the cargo ship Ocean Gladiator came with more supplies for the base.

== Day and night cycles ==
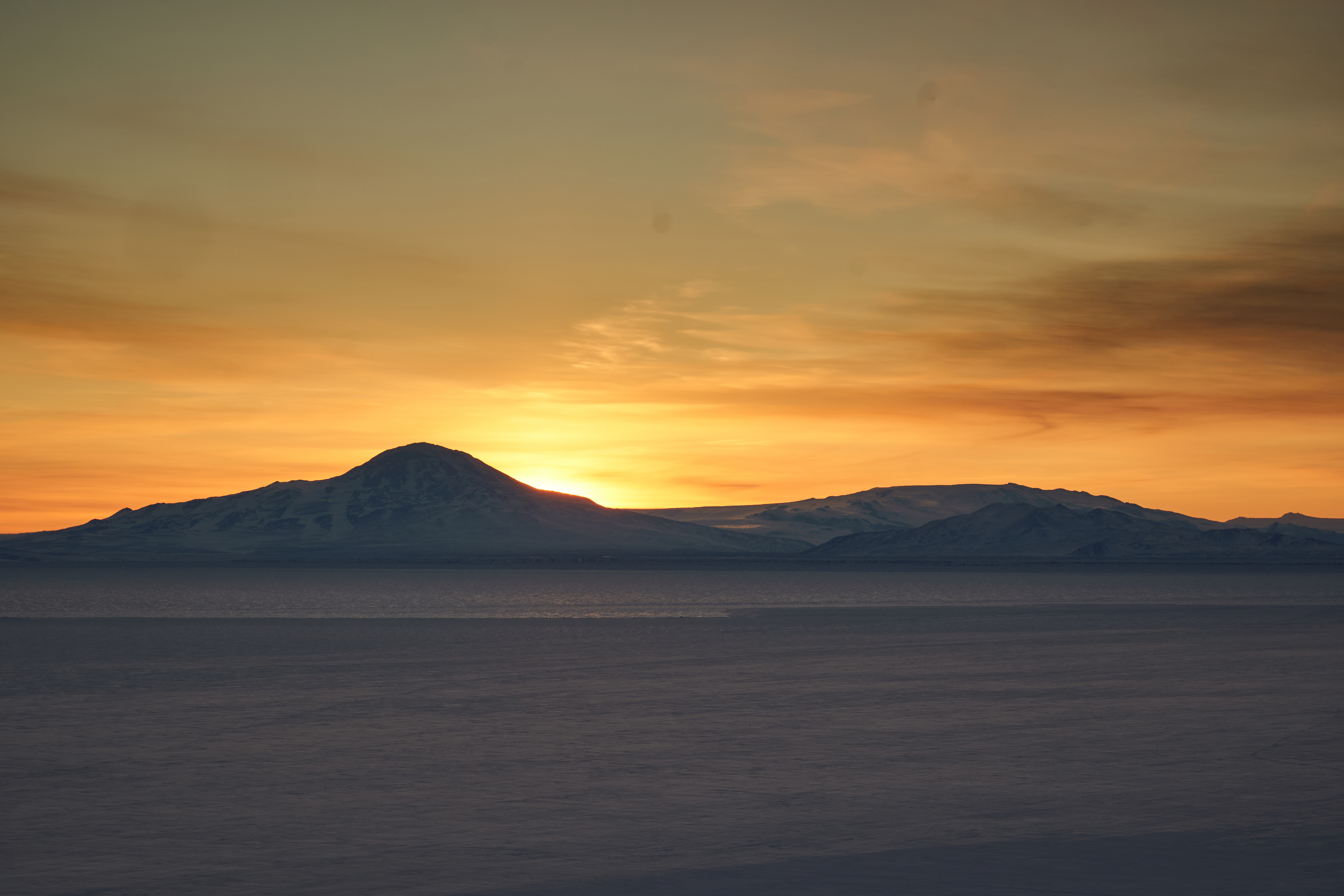
The last sunset of the year, setting behind Mount Discovery. The next day the sun rises but does not set until the following year.

McMurdo Station has four periods throughout the year of day/night cycles: a period of polar day with 24/7 light, a period of a normal day/night cycle, then a period polar night (24/7 darkness), and finally another period of normal night and day. The polar night lasts from about April to August, with continuous daylight from late October to February. Stars of the southern celestial hemisphere are visible during the polar night.

Unlike the South Pole, where the Sun stays visible for six months and then remains dark for the next six, McMurdo Station experiences sunsets and sunrises throughout the year. At 77.85° South it lies south of the Antarctic Circle, and accordingly has periods of continuous daylight and darkness. The Sun gradually rises during the September equinox, reaches its highest point at the December solstice, and sets at the March equinox. From late August to October, there is a normal day-night cycle. After October's final sunset, McMurdo experiences 24-hour daylight until February, when the first sunset of the year occurs. The cycle repeats with sunrise and sunset until the final sunrise in April, followed by twilight and 24-hour darkness until the next August.

The station uses New Zealand time (UTC+12 during standard time and UTC+13 during daylight saving time) since all flights to McMurdo station depart from Christchurch and, therefore, all official travel from the pole goes through New Zealand.

== Climate ==
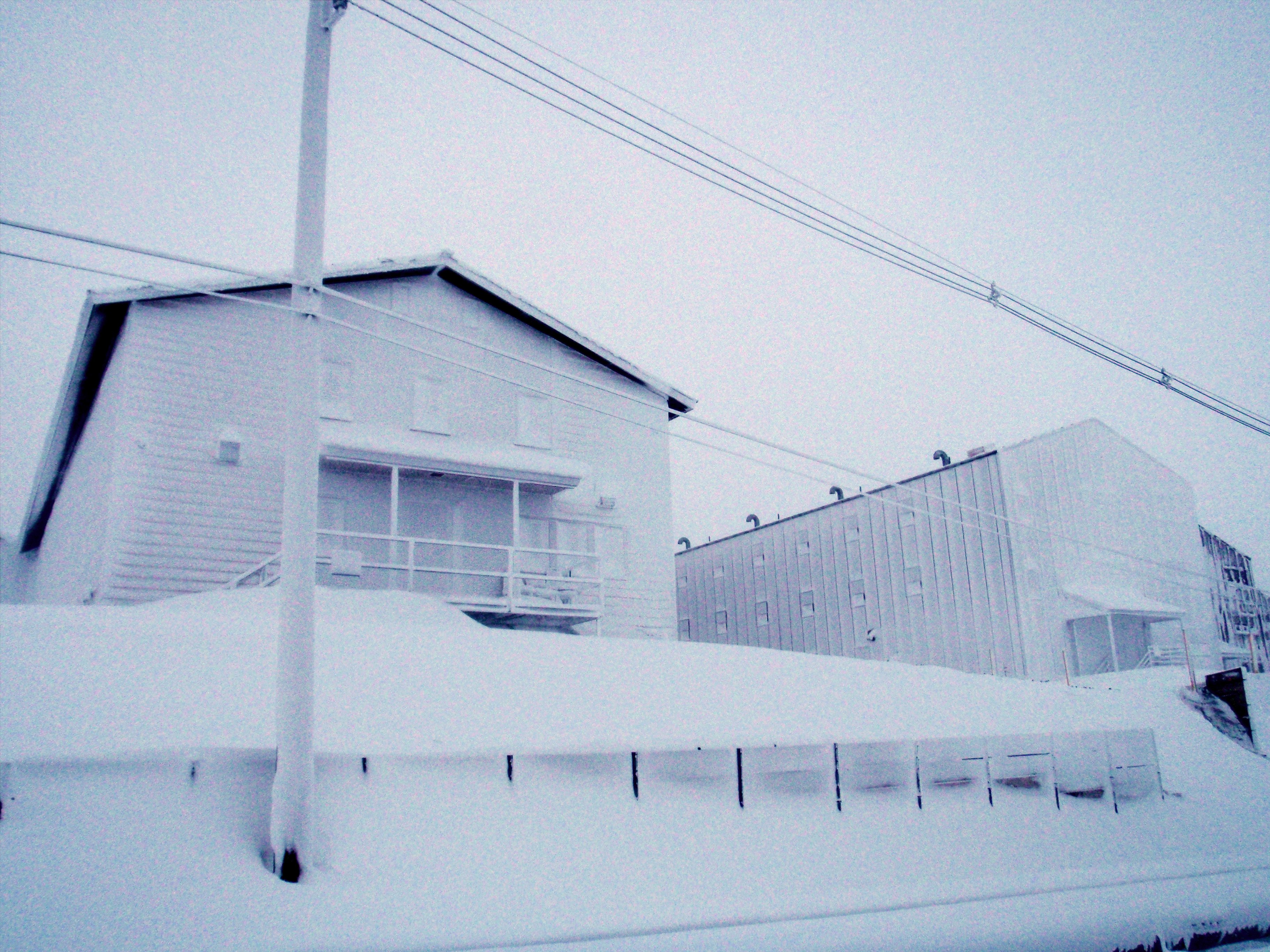
Snow blasted dormitories, 2009

With all months having an average temperature below freezing, McMurdo features a polar ice cap climate (Köppen EF). However, in the warmest months (December and January) the monthly average high temperature may occasionally rise above freezing. The place is protected from cold waves from the interior of Antarctica by the Transantarctic Mountains, so temperatures below −40° are rare, compared to more exposed places like Neumayer Station, which usually gets those temperatures a few times every year, often as early as May, and sometimes even as early as April, and very rarely above 0 °C. The highest temperature ever recorded at McMurdo was 10.8 °C on December 21, 1987. There is enough snowmelt in summer that a few species of moss and lichen can grow.

The average yearly temperature is freezing, but it can get as high as 8 °C (46 °F) in the austral summer and as low as -50 °C (-58 °F) in the austral winter. McMurdo Station is a windy place with an average wind speed of about 10 knots (11 mph, 19 kph), but with gusts ten times that possible. In 2017, a winter storm lasting for hours had sustained winds of 72 mph (116 kph, 63 knots).

The station gets about one and half yards/meters of snow each year, but will be snow-free late in summer. Antarctica in general is actually quite dry, and would be considered a desert, but the coastal areas get more precipitation.

Climate data for McMurdo Station (extremes 1956–present)
Month	Jan	Feb	Mar	Apr	May	Jun	Jul	Aug	Sep	Oct	Nov	Dec	Year
Record high °C (°F)	10.2 (50.4)	5.9 (42.6)	−1.1 (30.0)	0.0 (32.0)	−1.3 (29.7)	3.3 (37.9)	−4.4 (24.1)	−2.0 (28.4)	−3.7 (25.3)	4.5 (40.1)	10.0 (50.0)	10.8 (51.4)	10.8 (51.4)
Mean daily maximum °C (°F)	−0.6 (30.9)	−7.3 (18.9)	−16.2 (2.8)	−17.3 (0.9)	−21.0 (−5.8)	−20.4 (−4.7)	−21.7 (−7.1)	−22.7 (−8.9)	−20.8 (−5.4)	−14.3 (6.3)	−6.5 (20.3)	−0.4 (31.3)	−14.2 (6.4)
Daily mean °C (°F)	−2.8 (27.0)	−8.8 (16.2)	−17.3 (0.9)	−20.9 (−5.6)	−23.3 (−9.9)	−22.9 (−9.2)	−25.8 (−14.4)	−27.4 (−17.3)	−25.7 (−14.3)	−19.4 (−2.9)	−9.7 (14.5)	−3.5 (25.7)	−17.3 (0.9)
Mean daily minimum °C (°F)	−4.6 (23.7)	−11.4 (11.5)	−21.3 (−6.3)	−23.4 (−10.1)	−26.5 (−15.7)	−26.8 (−16.2)	−28.4 (−19.1)	−29.5 (−21.1)	−27.5 (−17.5)	−19.8 (−3.6)	−10.9 (12.4)	−4.4 (24.1)	−19.7 (−3.5)
Record low °C (°F)	−22.1 (−7.8)	−25.0 (−13.0)	−43.3 (−45.9)	−41.9 (−43.4)	−44.8 (−48.6)	−43.9 (−47.0)	−50.6 (−59.1)	−49.4 (−56.9)	−45.1 (−49.2)	−40.0 (−40.0)	−28.5 (−19.3)	−18.0 (−0.4)	−50.6 (−59.1)
Average precipitation mm (inches)	16 (0.6)	29 (1.1)	15 (0.6)	18 (0.7)	21 (0.8)	28 (1.1)	17 (0.7)	13 (0.5)	10 (0.4)	20 (0.8)	12 (0.5)	14 (0.6)	213 (8.4)
Average snowfall cm (inches)	6.6 (2.6)	22.4 (8.8)	11.4 (4.5)	12.7 (5.0)	17.0 (6.7)	17.8 (7.0)	14.0 (5.5)	6.6 (2.6)	7.6 (3.0)	13.5 (5.3)	8.4 (3.3)	10.4 (4.1)	148.4 (58.4)
Average precipitation days (≥ 1.0 mm)	2.6	4.7	3.2	4.5	5.5	5.7	4.7	4.1	3.0	3.2	2.4	2.5	46.1
Average snowy days	12.8	17.6	17.8	16.4	16.2	15.6	15.3	14.5	13.3	14.5	13.5	13.8	181.3
Average relative humidity (%)	66.7	65.2	66.6	66.6	64.2	62.4	60.2	63.4	55.8	61.4	64.7	67.0	63.7
Source 1: Deutscher Wetterdienst (average temperatures)
Source 2: NOAA (precipitation, snowy days, and humidity data 1961–1986), Meteo Climat (record highs and lows)

== Communications ==
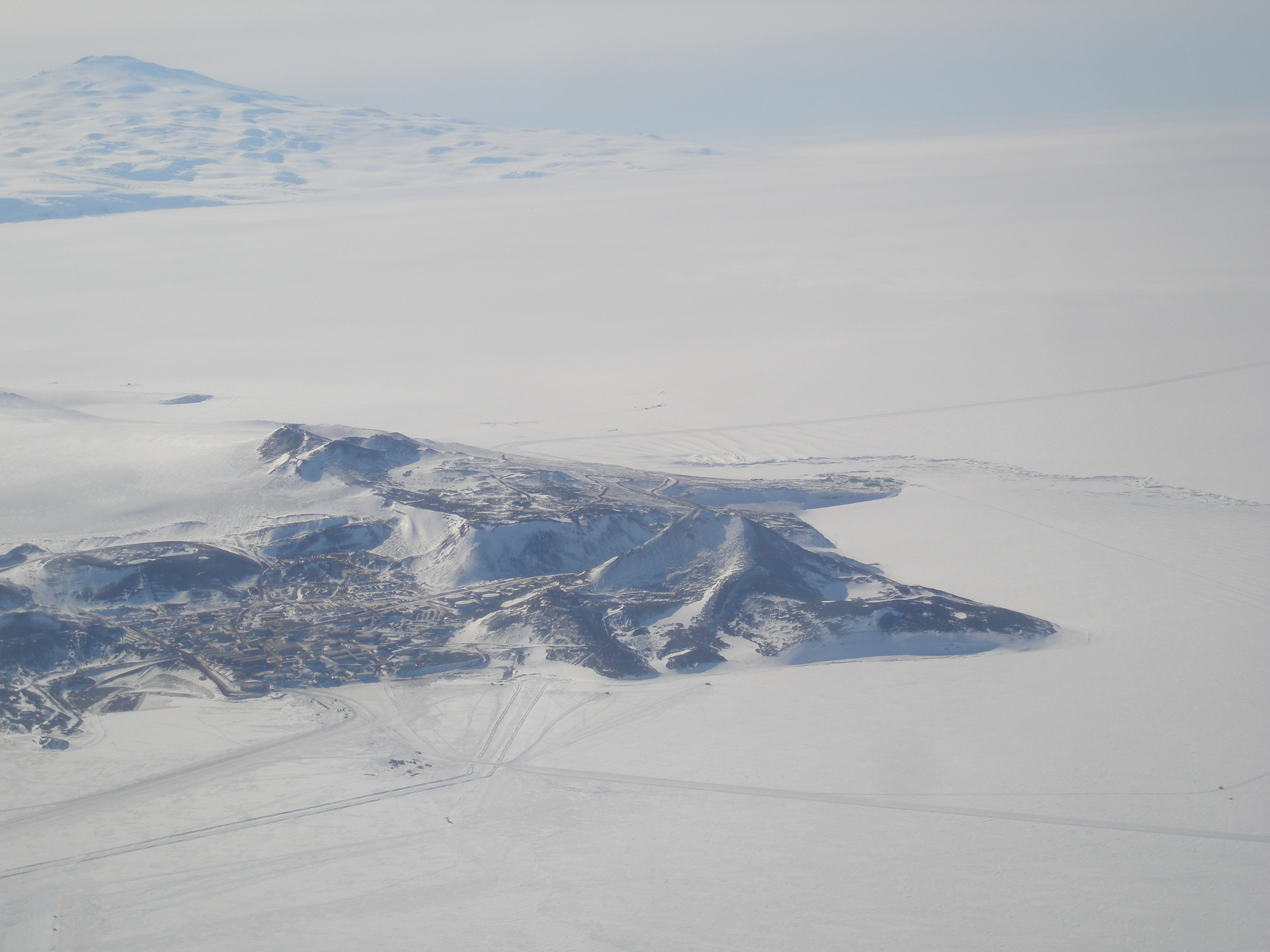
Aerial view of the tip of Hut Point Peninsula with McMurdo Station on the near side and Scott Base on the far side

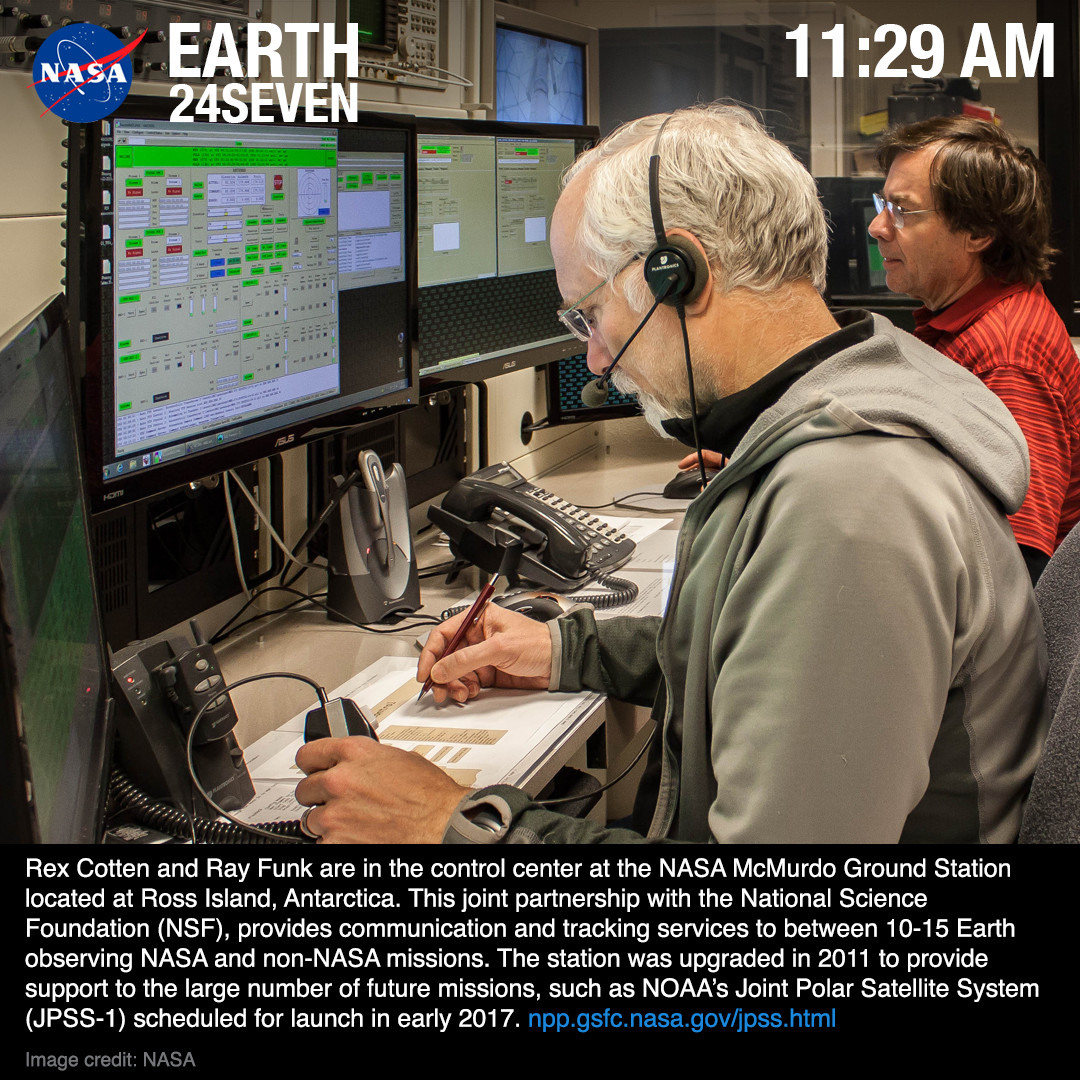
Operations for NASA-NSF McMurdo Ground Station at McMurdo Station.

Starting in 1963, McMurdo played host to one of the only two shortwave broadcast stations in Antarctica. From sign-on to 1971, the callsign was KMSA, from then on it was changed to WASA (W Antarctic Support Activities), later changing to AFAN in 1975. As KMSA, the station broadcast in the same building as the bowling alley, the barber shop and the retail store. A part of the vinyl collection reportedly came from Vietnam, believing to have been played by Adrian Cronauer's show in Saigon. In a 1997 interview to The Antarctic Sun, Cronauer denied these claims and the vinyl collection was apparently destroyed. The station—AFAN McMurdo—initially operated on AM 600 and had a power of 50 W, but by 1974, it transmitted with a power of 1 kilowatt on the shortwave frequency of 6,012 kHz and became a target for shortwave radio listening to hobbyists around the world because of its rarity. The station was picked up by DX for the first time in New Zealand in July 1974, and within a few months had its signal received as far as the US east coast. AFAN had changed frequencies several times in subsequent years. The station continued broadcasting on shortwave into the 1980s when it dropped shortwave while continuing FM transmission.

For a time, McMurdo had Antarctica's only television station, AFAN-TV, running vintage programs provided by the military. Broadcasts started on November 9, 1973, with a mix of US programs and interviews with visitors and scientists, as well as a daily news and weather service. The station's equipment was susceptible to "electronic burping" from the diesel generators in the outpost. In the mid-90s, a cable network was installed. By 1998, shortly after the launch of new AFN television services the year before, the traditional AFN network was broadcast over cable channel 2, while NewSports ran on channel 11 and Spectrum on channel 13.

McMurdo Station receives both Internet and voice communications by satellite communications via the Optus D1 satellite and relayed to Sydney, Australia. A satellite dish at Black Island provides 20 Mbit/s Internet connectivity and voice communications. Voice communications are tied into the United States Antarctic Program headquarters in Centennial, Colorado, providing inbound and outbound calls to McMurdo from the US. Voice communications within the station are conducted via VHF radio.

Testing of the Starlink service began in September 2022, with a second terminal providing connectivity for the Allan Hills field camp brought in November 2022.

Starlink allowed a large increase in bandwidth for residents of McMurdo, include 24×7 availability during the winter season, and for the 2023–2024 season also for morale use. The AIR project also planned to expand Starlink coverage to dorms and other spaces. The greatly expanded internet access has allowed those stationed at McMurdo to stay in touch with the rest of the world more easily and indulge in high-bandwidth leisure activities like watching sporting events.

== Power and water systems ==
The base ran off generators and supplies at the start, and a nuclear power plant operated from 1962 to 1973, which was also used to make water. After that a generator plant produced power, heat, and water. A water treatment plant was added in 2002, and in the 2010s wind power, shared with Scott Base, supplemented the diesel generators.

Almost all water and sewer lines are above ground, and are insulated and heated. Excavating frozen ground for repairs is difficult, so having them above ground makes maintenance easier.

As of 2024, all power at U.S. Antarctic stations is delivered at 120 volts, 60 hertz AC. Water at McMurdo and Palmer stations is produced via reverse osmosis.

=== Nuclear power (1962–1972) ===
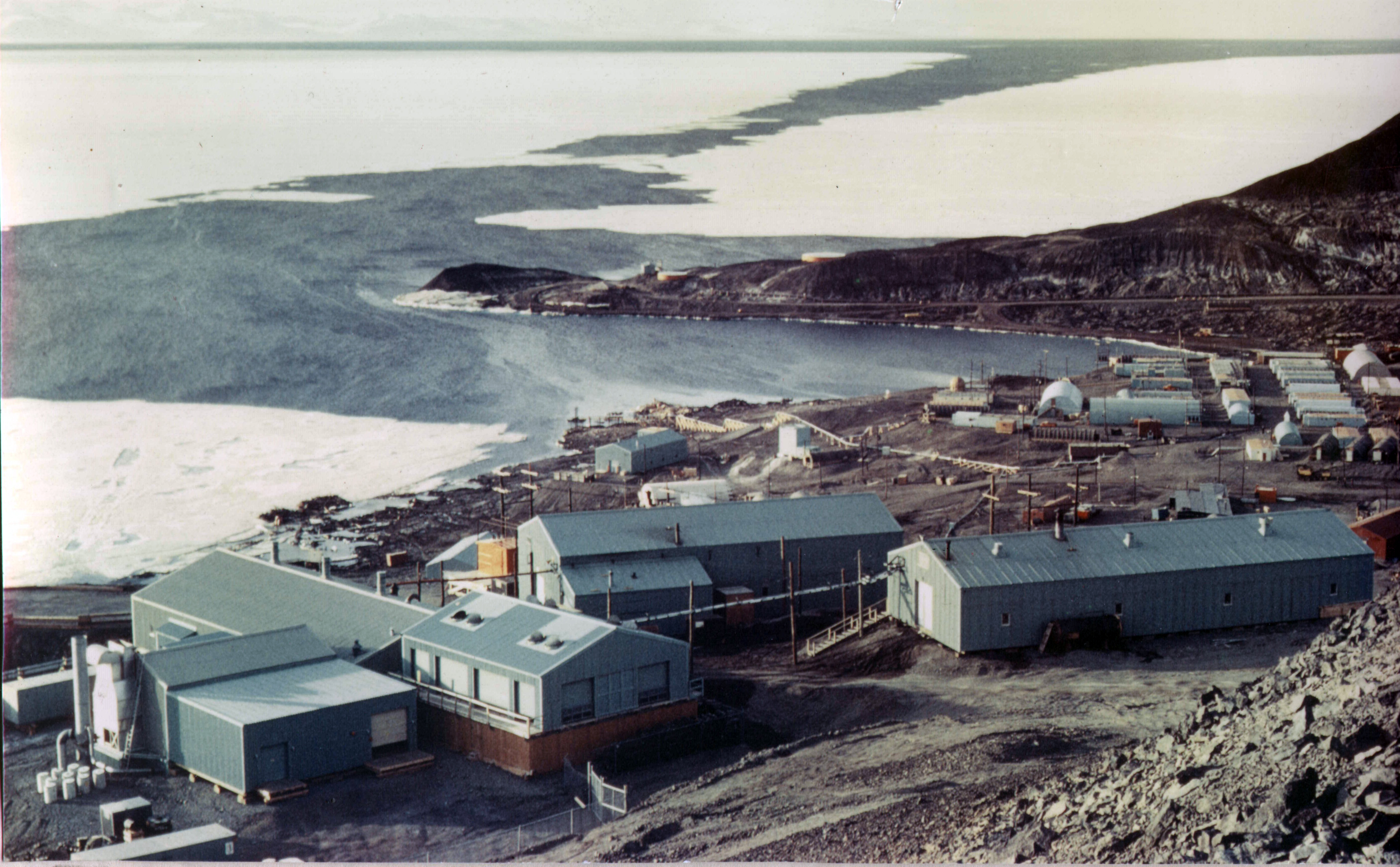
The former PM-3A Nuclear Power Plant at McMurdo, 1965

On March 3, 1962, the U.S. Navy activated the PM-3A nuclear power plant at the station. The unit was prefabricated in modules to facilitate transport and assembly. Engineers designed the components to weigh no more than 30,000 pounds (14,000 kg) each and to measure no more than 8 feet 8 inches (2.64 m) by 8 feet 8 inches (2.64 m) by 30 feet (9.1 m). A single core no larger than an oil drum served as the heart of the nuclear reactor. These size and weight restrictions aimed to allow delivery of the reactor in an LC-130 Hercules aircraft, but the components were delivered by ship.

The reactor generated 1.8 MW of electrical power and reportedly replaced the need for 1,500 US gallons (5,700 L) of oil daily. Engineers applied the reactor's power, for instance, in producing steam for the salt-water distillation plant. As a result of continuing safety issues (hairline cracks in the reactor and water leaks), the U.S. Army Nuclear Power Program decommissioned the plant in 1972.

=== Diesel generators ===
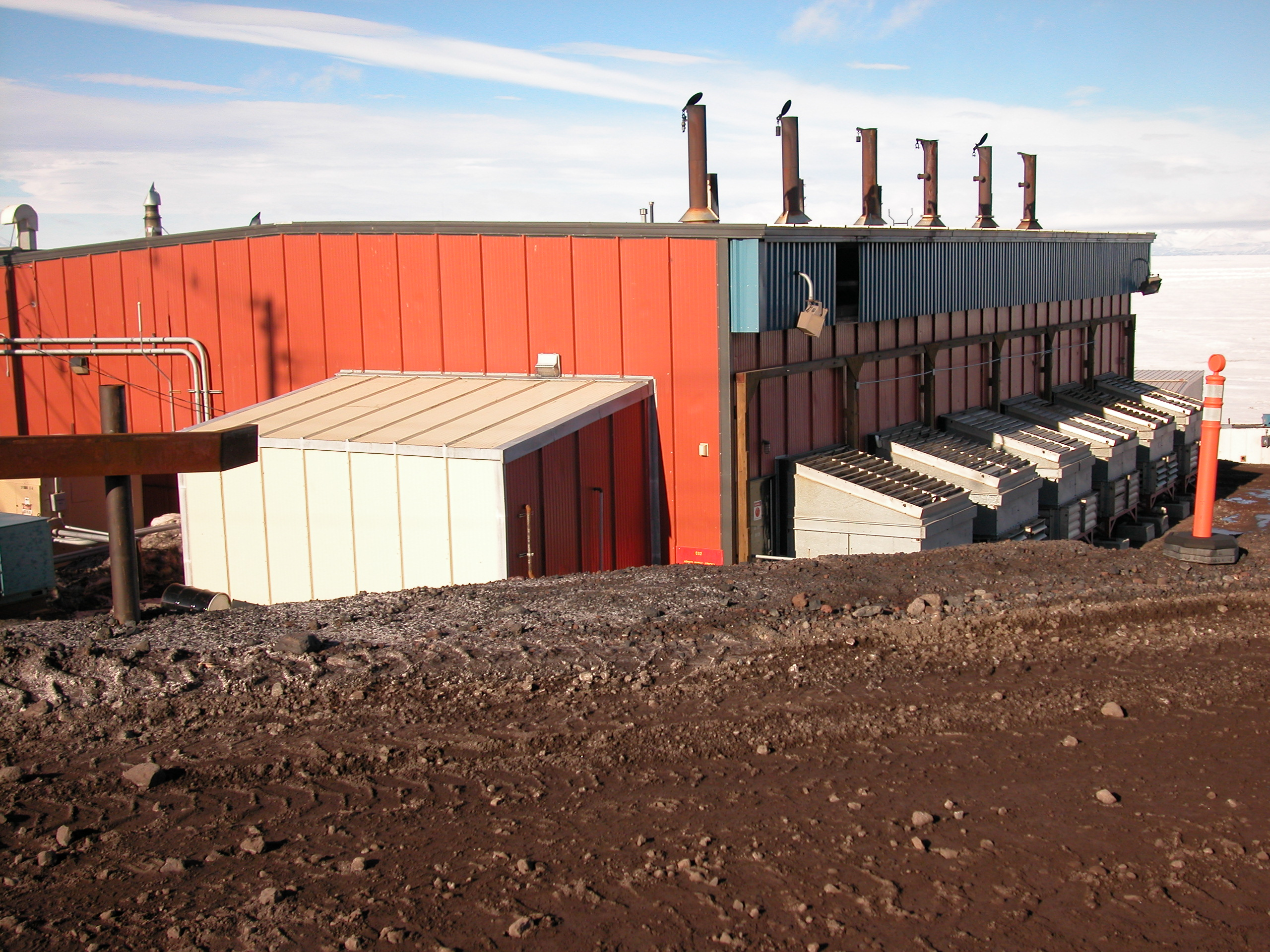
The old generator plant

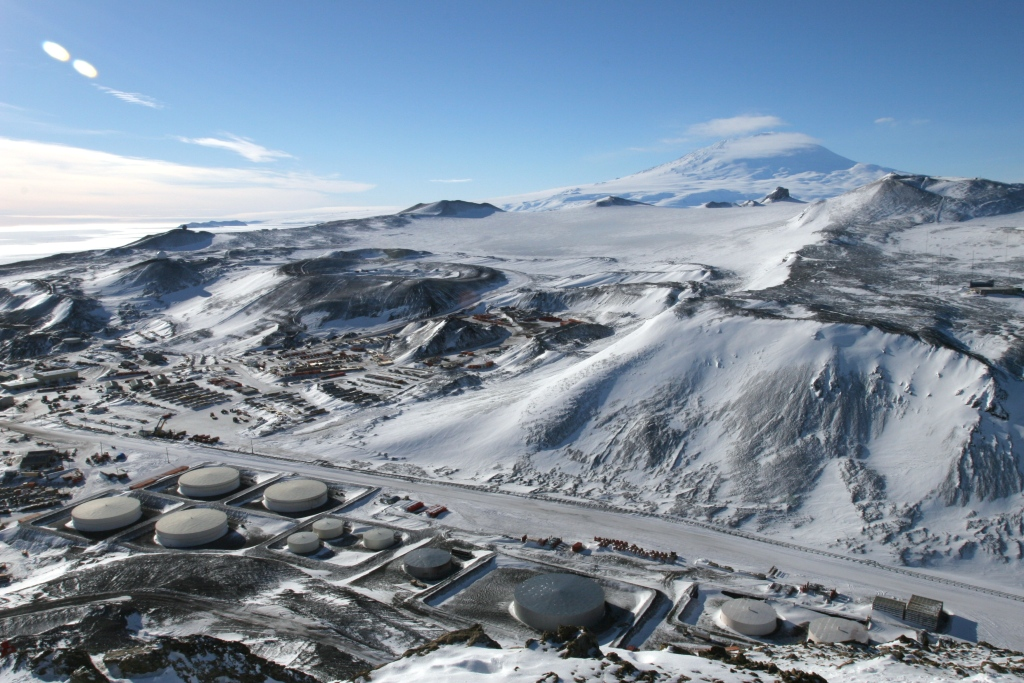
Tank farm stores resources for the long austral winter, when the Station is all but cut off from the world

Conventional diesel generators replaced the nuclear power station, with several 500-kilowatt (670 hp) diesel generators in a central powerhouse providing electric power. A conventionally fueled water-desalination plant provided fresh water.

The generators provide not only electricity, but also heat and water to the station. Power from the new wind farm is also integrated when possible, though it shares that power with nearby Scott Base. The power demands vary greatly due to the changes in the base population.

From 1982 to 2011, the base had six generators that could produce 900 kilowatts each, but it depends on the number of people at the base. With 800 people at the base around 1800 kilowatts are produced; the facility is not run at maximum capacity all the time. Heat from the engines, which have to be cooled regardless, is used to heat buildings at McMurdo by a heat exchanger. This design was completed in 1982.

In 2011 a new generator system came online that had three in one building and two in another, the water plant building, to provide increased redundancy. There are four engines rated at 1500 kW and one at 1300 kW Base power is also supplemented by the wind power station on Hut Point Peninsula shared by McMurdo and Scott bases.

The generators power the desalination plant, which makes fresh water for the base by taking sea water and putting it through a reverse osmosis filter.

=== Wind power ===
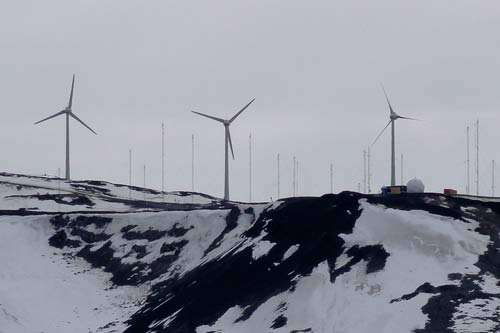
Wind turbines of Scott and McMurdo

The southernmost wind farm on Earth is located on Ross Island, supplementing power and reducing fuel consumption at McMurdo and Scott. The three-tower facility on Crater Hill has an average wind speed of nearly 30 km/h, at 40 m height of the initial turbines.

In January 2010, three new wind turbines had their opening ceremony by McMurdo and Scott officials, bringing significant wind power to Ross island; three turbines rated at 330 kW each for a total of nearly 990 kW shared between the two bases, was estimated to save 240 thousand gallons of fuel per year.

Three Enercon E-33 (330 kW each) wind turbines were deployed in 2009 to power McMurdo and New Zealand's Scott Base, reducing diesel consumption by 11% or 463,000 liters per year. The subsequent failure of a proprietary, non-replaceable part critical to battery storage reduced the power generation of the turbines by 66% by 2019. Three new wind turbines were planned for the 2023–4 season, with great capacity: one new one will be greater than previous three combined. The strong winds make wind power a practical alternative, and the new wind system should supply 90% of the power at Scott Base.

== Transport ==
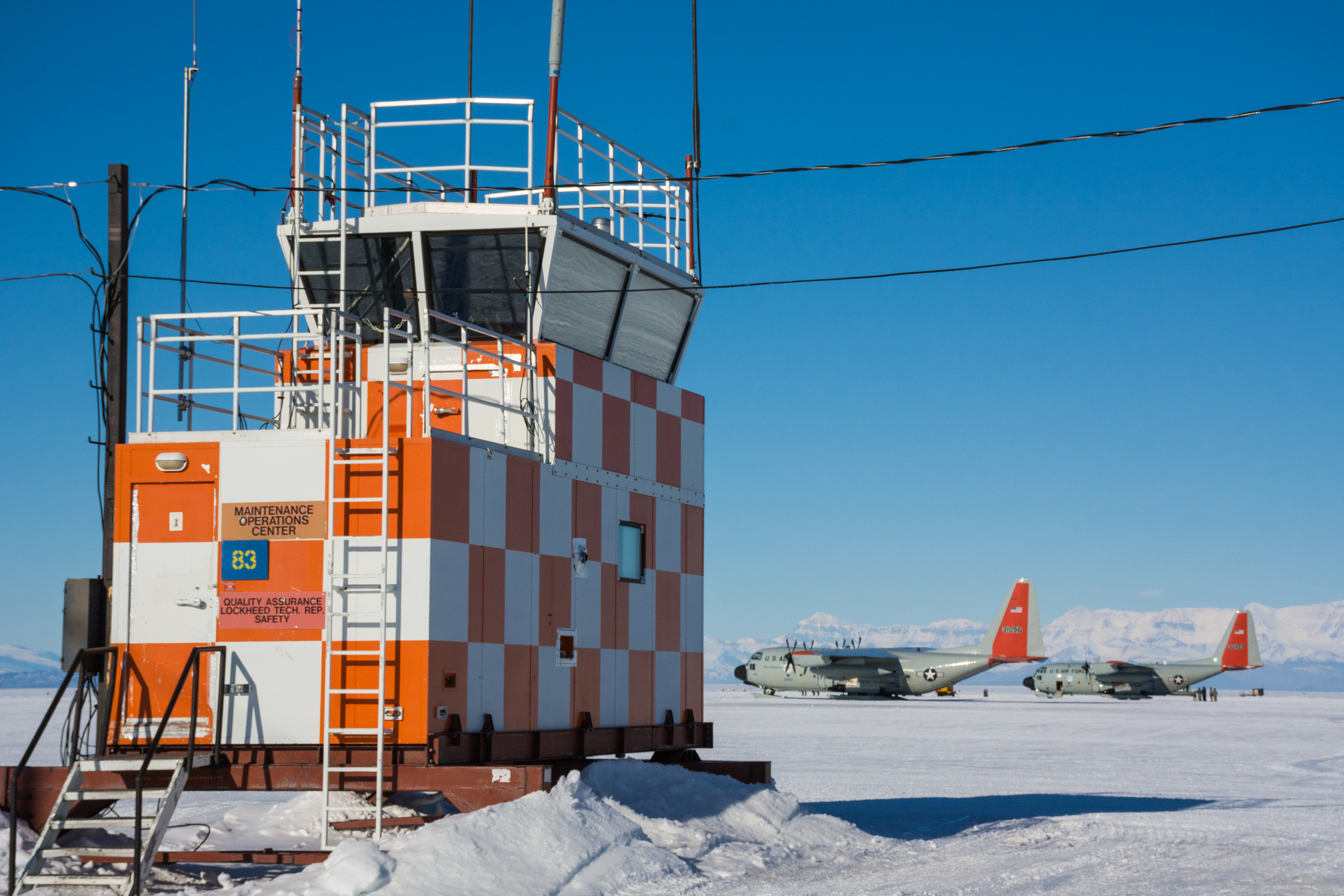
Willams Field control tower (LC-130s in background). Willams field has served the Hut Point bases since the start and is located on the Ross Ice shelf

McMurdo Station relies on three types of transport: land, sea, and air, each facing challenges posed by extreme cold, snow, and ice. Access by sea often requires an icebreaker, while ground transport utilizes snow tires, tracks, and sleds. Aircraft such as the LC-130, equipped with skis, can land on snow, and more prepared ice or compacted snow runways can accommodate conventional landing gear, though extremely cold temperatures can complicate aircraft operations. Weather conditions also affect the harbor, which freezes over in winter, and McMurdo Sound is covered by sea ice. Various vehicles are used to navigate different snow, ice, and ground conditions. One of the most hazardous areas to traverse is glacial ice, where snow can conceal deep crevasses.

McMurdo Station has a heliport that facilitates access to nearby locations, and a refueling station is located across McMurdo Sound to the west, at Marble Point. Due to the absence of roads and challenging ground conditions, helicopters play a crucial role in accessing and supplying stations and research projects in the surrounding area.

=== Air ===
McMurdo station is serviced seasonally from Christchurch Airport about 3,920 kilometres (2,440 mi) away by air, with C-17 Globemaster and Lockheed LC-130, by two airports:

- Phoenix Airfield (ICAO: NZFX), a compacted snow runway which replaced Pegasus Field (ICAO: NZPG) in 2017
- Williams Field (ICAO: NZWD), a permanent snow runway for ski-equipped aircraft.

Historically, a seasonal Ice Runway (NZIR) was used until December though this has fallen out favor of the compacted snow runway of Phoenix airfield since 2017. The ice runway was built out over frozen sea ice in the late months of the year, after the polar dawn started but before the sea ice broke up.

=== Sea ===
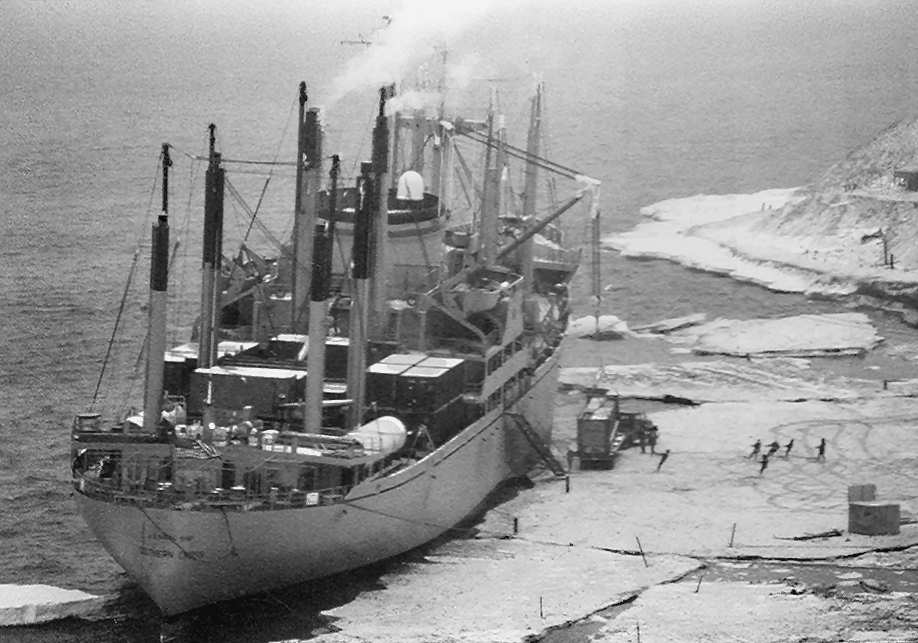
This 1983 image of USNS Southern Cross at McMurdo Station shows cargo operations on a floating ice pier.

McMurdo Station is home to the world's southernmost harbor, which plays a crucial role in supplying the station and supporting various Antarctic projects. Due to challenging weather conditions, access to the harbor often requires the use of an icebreaker.

McMurdo harbor has been opened by U.S. CGC Polar Star which comes every year to McMurdo. Access to ships in the harbor can be done via an ice pier, though a modular causeway was in development A modular floating Marine Causeway system was used in January 2025.

==== Heliport ====
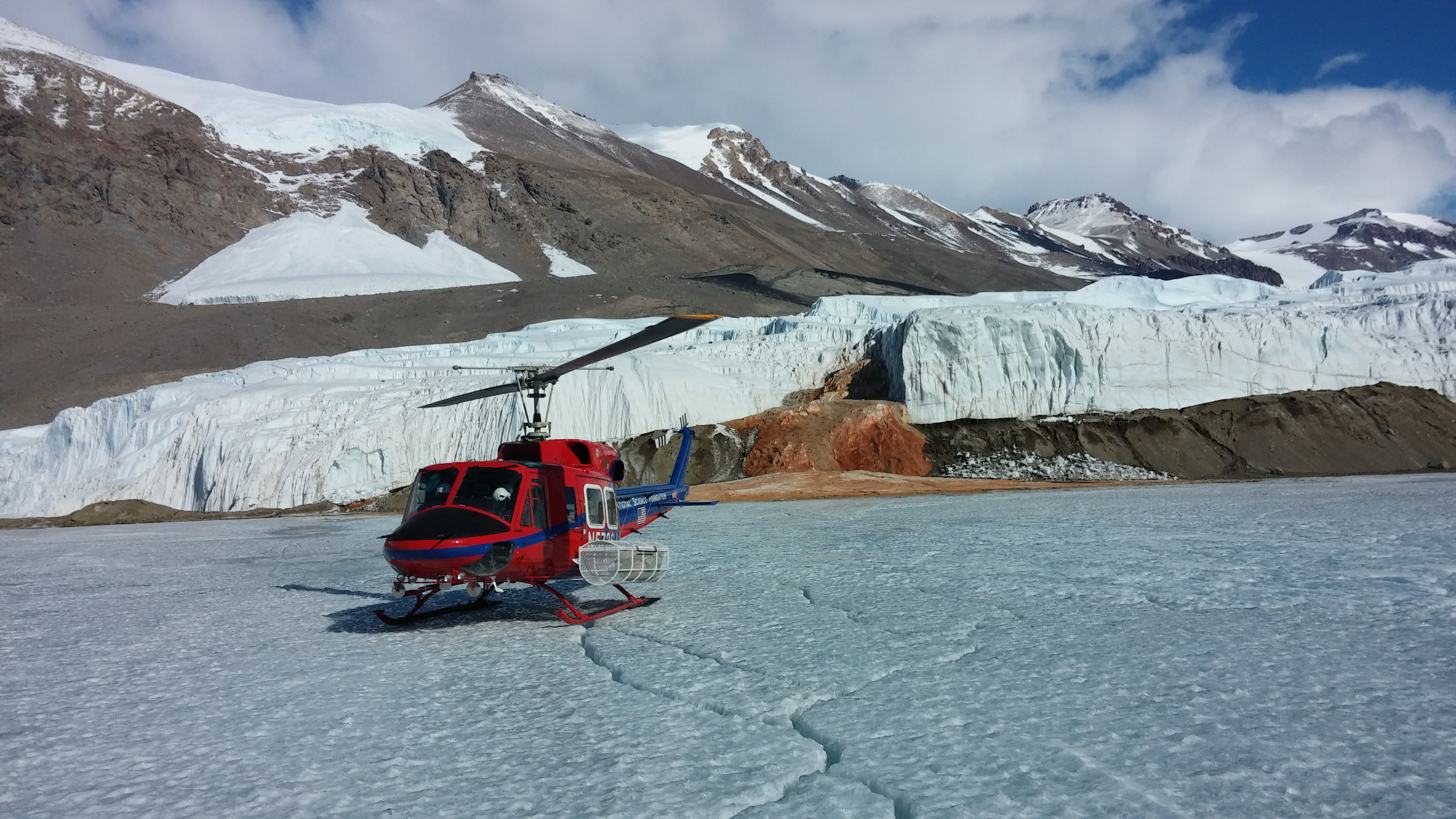
A NSF helicopter from McMurdo Station transports an expedition to a glacier for the IceMole project (2014)

McMurdo Station has a helicopter pad, with helicopters supporting various operations in the area, including trips to the McMurdo Dry Valleys. Also, there is a helicopter refueling station across the channel at Marble Point.

The helicopters used at McMurdo Station have varied over time. Initially, Navy helicopters were employed, followed by a period during which Army helicopters were also used. By 1999, after the departure of the U.S. Navy, the National Science Foundation began using primarily civilian helicopters for operations at the base.

=== Ground ===
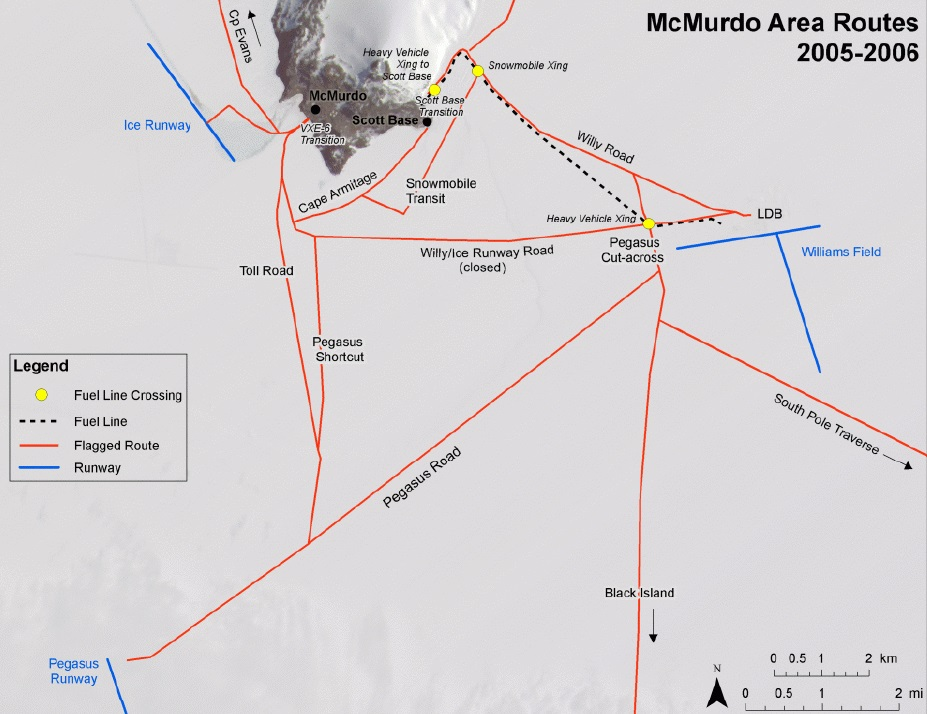
Map showing ice traverses to airstrips at that time. Pegasus Airfield was replaced by Phoenix Airfield

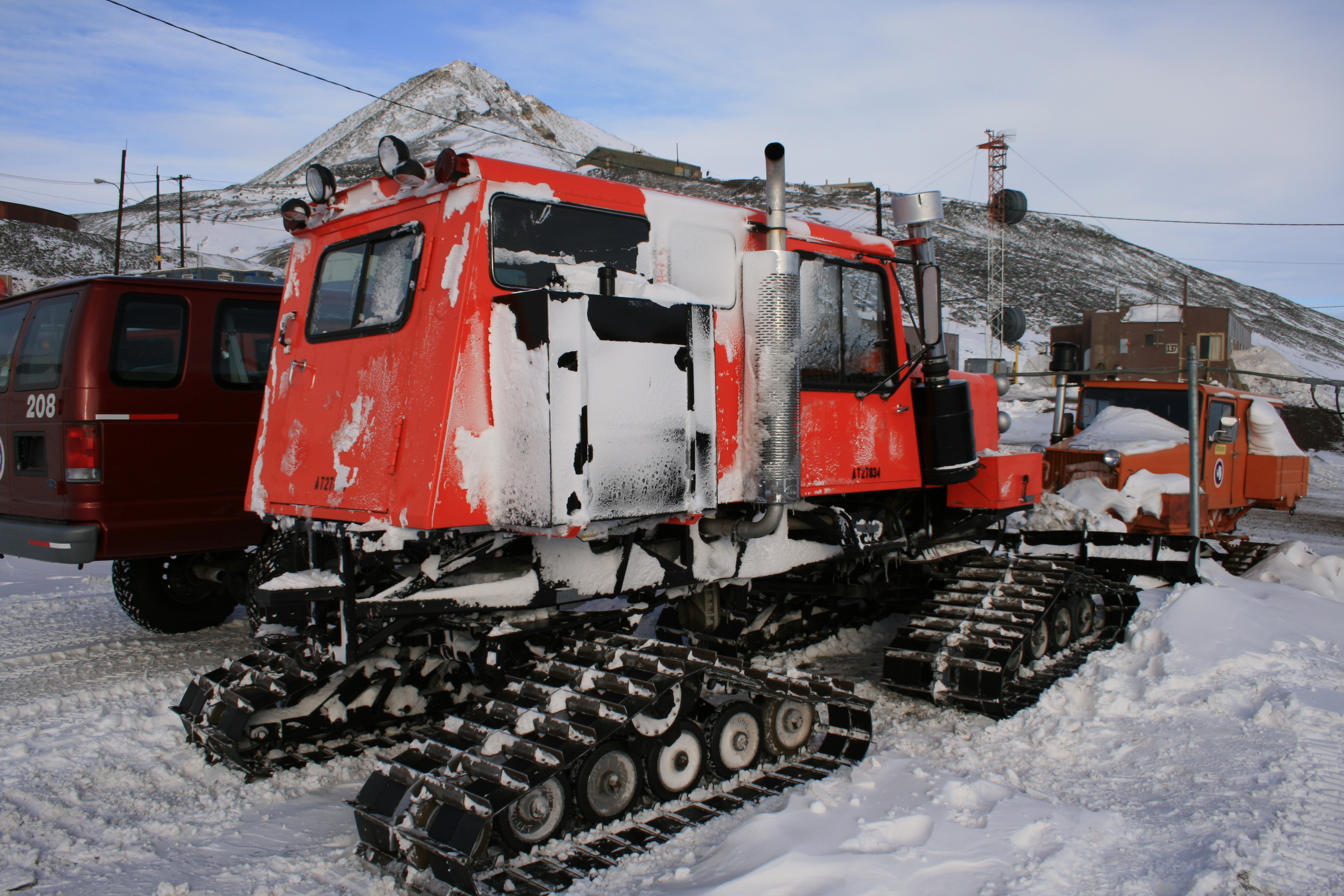
Tucker Snocat at McMurdo, note tracks

A multitude of on- and off-road vehicles transport people and cargo around the station area. One of the unique aspects to McMurdo is dealing with different types of terrain, which besides the local gravel roads also includes dealing with off-road, snow, sea ice, and glacial traverses. Different types of vehicles are often used in different situations, with everything from trucks, snow-mobiles, and unique tracked vehicles. McMurdo Station is the northern end of the seasonal road to the South Pole, which each year takes critical supplies to the south pole.

McMurdo currently operates about 60 super duty trucks. There are hundreds of vehicles at McMurdo, encompassing many different types. Sleds of various types and sizes are commonly used at McMurdo, including those pulled by ski-doos (snowmobiles).

A large red snow bus known as Ivan the Terra was a notable vehicle at McMurdo Station, used for over three decades (1994–2025). It was a customized Foremost Terra bus, a tri-axle people mover equipped with very large tires designed for traversing harsh conditions. It served as a shuttle from the Station to airfields before its retirement and subsequent transport to New Zealand, where it may be preserved at a museum or sold off.

There is a road from McMurdo to the New Zealand Scott Base, and open since 2005, an ice road and glacial traverse to the South Pole called the South Pole Traverse or McMurdo-South Pole highway.

The McMurdo-South Pole traverse is a seasonal, over 1,000-mile snow and ice route that crosses the frozen Ross Sea, glaciers, and the Antarctic ice cap to reach the South Pole. It was first established at the end of 2005 and requires annual maintenance to check for new crevasses and clear snow. The traverse has reduced the number of flights to the South Pole by enabling bulk transport of fuel and cargo over the surface. It has also been used for setting adventuring records.

The Cape Armitage Loop Trail is a seasonal route that connects McMurdo Station to Scott Base, traversing over the sea ice.

== Science research ==
McMurdo Station serves as a key gateway and logistics hub for projects across Antarctica, as well as a site for scientific research. Fields of particular interest include glacial science (including the antarctic ice sheet and its nature), antarctic wildlife, and local volcanic activity. The station functions as a site for studying Mount Erebus, an active volcano with an exposed lava lake, the formation of Erebus crystals, and geological formations such as ice caves formed by volcanic gases.

A few colonies of Emperor penguins can be found near the base, and high resolution photos from helicopters and space have been used to track the local penguin population.

Examples of marine life in McMurdo Sound include soft corals, finger sponges, sea anemones, Antarctic scallops, Notothenioidei fishes, and other life able to survive the cold. In the late 2010s the MOO project placed an undersea webcam in McMurdo sound to observe these and other marine life such as Weddel seals. One result was to record the vocalizations of the seals.

One particular area of interest are notothenioid fishes, which have anti-freezing proteins in their bodies which prevents them from freezing. In 2010, an ANDRILL team discovered a new species of sea anemone that lives on the underside of the Ross Ice Shelf. A sample was taken back to McMurdo station for further study, and the species was a bit mysterious as it was understood how it attaches itself to the ice. The ANDRILL team discovered it by accident, as they normally work on drilling ice cores.

McMurdo Dry Valleys, a unique, nearly snowless area of Antarctica that lies to the west of the station, have also been studied. Meteorological data and other aspects of the dry valleys have been studied, and ancient glacial deposits in the valleys are of particular interest.

The NASA balloon launch facility has supported atmospheric and astronomy projects since 1996, with projects like MAXIS, launched in 2000. MAXIS spent about three weeks aloft circling Antarctica, and its purpose was to "study electron precipitation from the magnetosphere into the ionosphere".

NASA's Marshall Space Flight Center (MSFC) conducted a radiation shielding experiment on the same flight. An example of a newer project is the Salter Test Flight Universal, which was launched in December 2024 and landed in January 2025; it carried five investigations and was a part of the annual Antarctic Long-Duration Balloon Campaign, which is part of NASA's Scientific Balloon Program.

An astronomical project at McMurdo is the McMurdo CosRay laboratory, which studied cosmic rays and came online in 1960. It was the longest running experiment at McMurdo Station, operating for several decades. The experiment was moved to Jang Bobo in 2016.

Areas of scientific research at McMurdo Station include:

- Astronomy
- Atmospheric sciences
- Biology
- Climatology
- Earth science
- Environmental science
- Geology
- Geophysics
- Glaciology
- Marine biology
- Oceanography
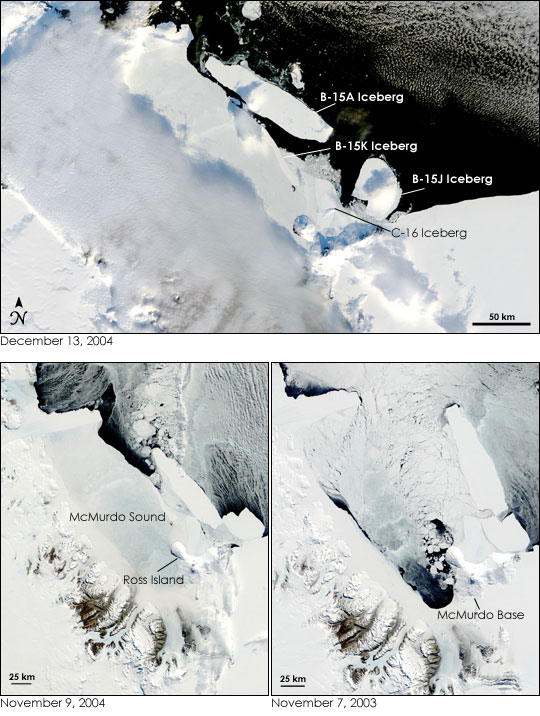
Large icebergs blocked the entrance to McMurdo sound in 2003–2004, keeping it frozen longer that year

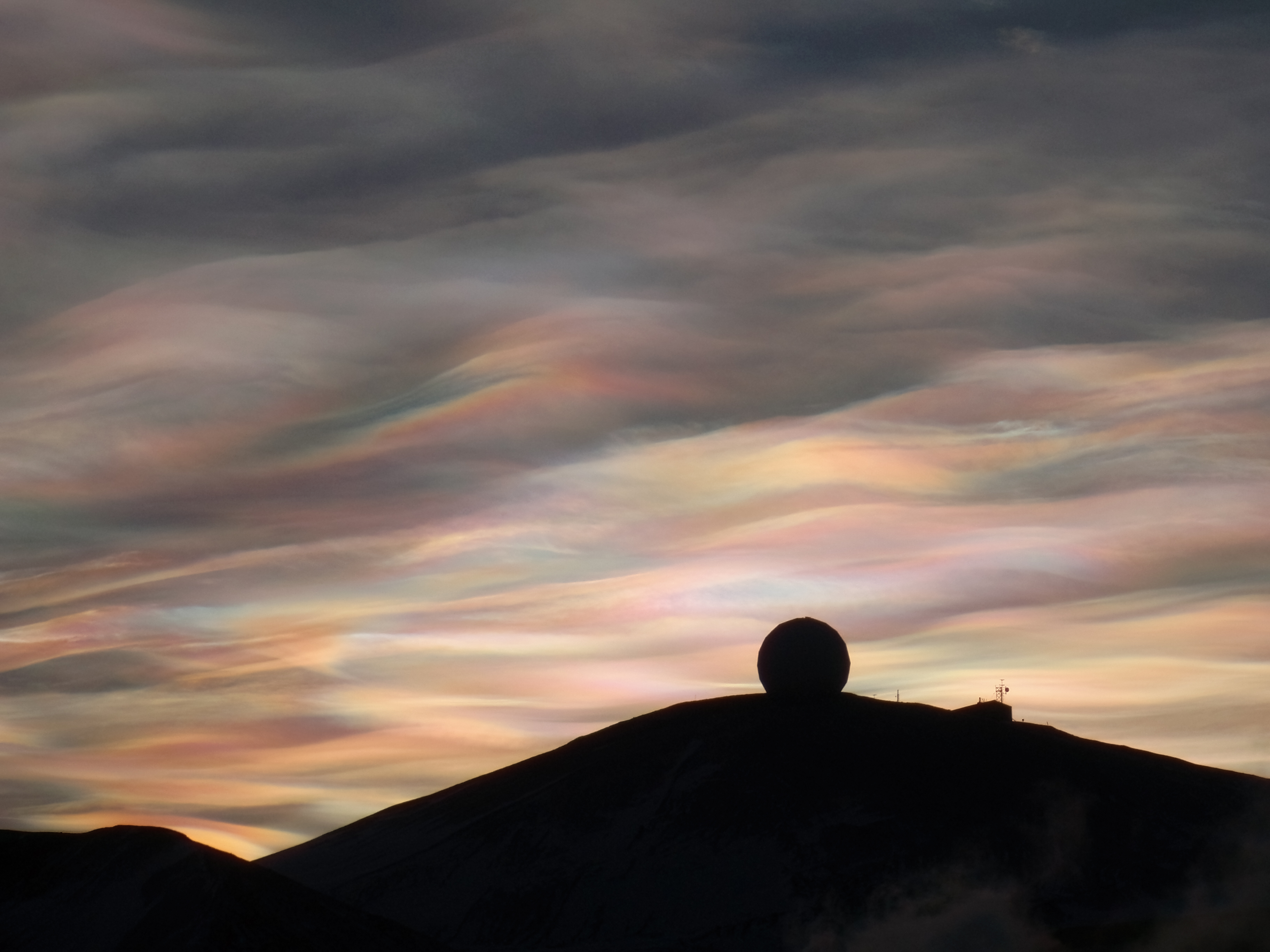
Radome silhouetted by sunlit nacreous clouds, August 2009

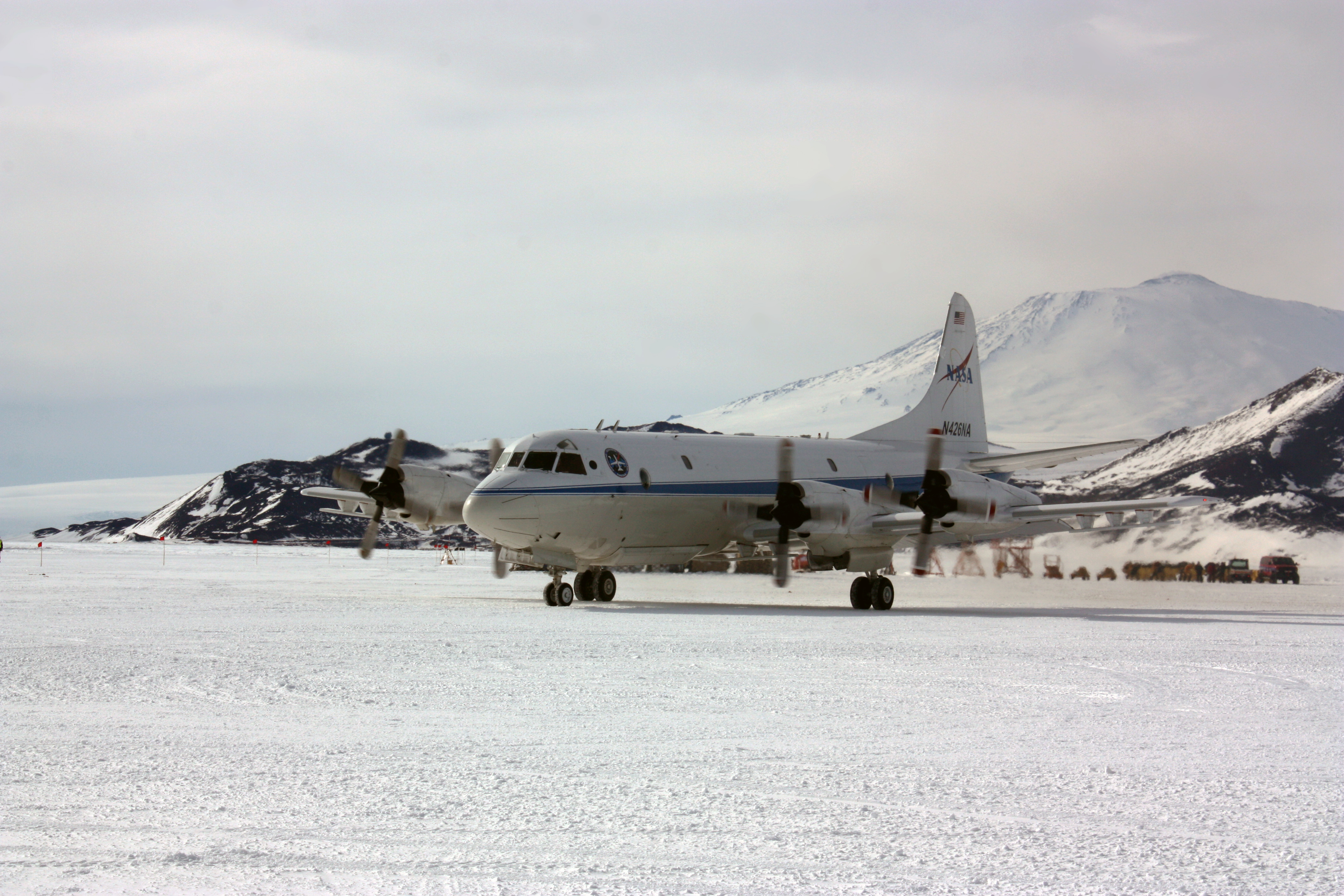
NASA Airborne Laboratory takes off from McMurdo in 2013 for a research campaign

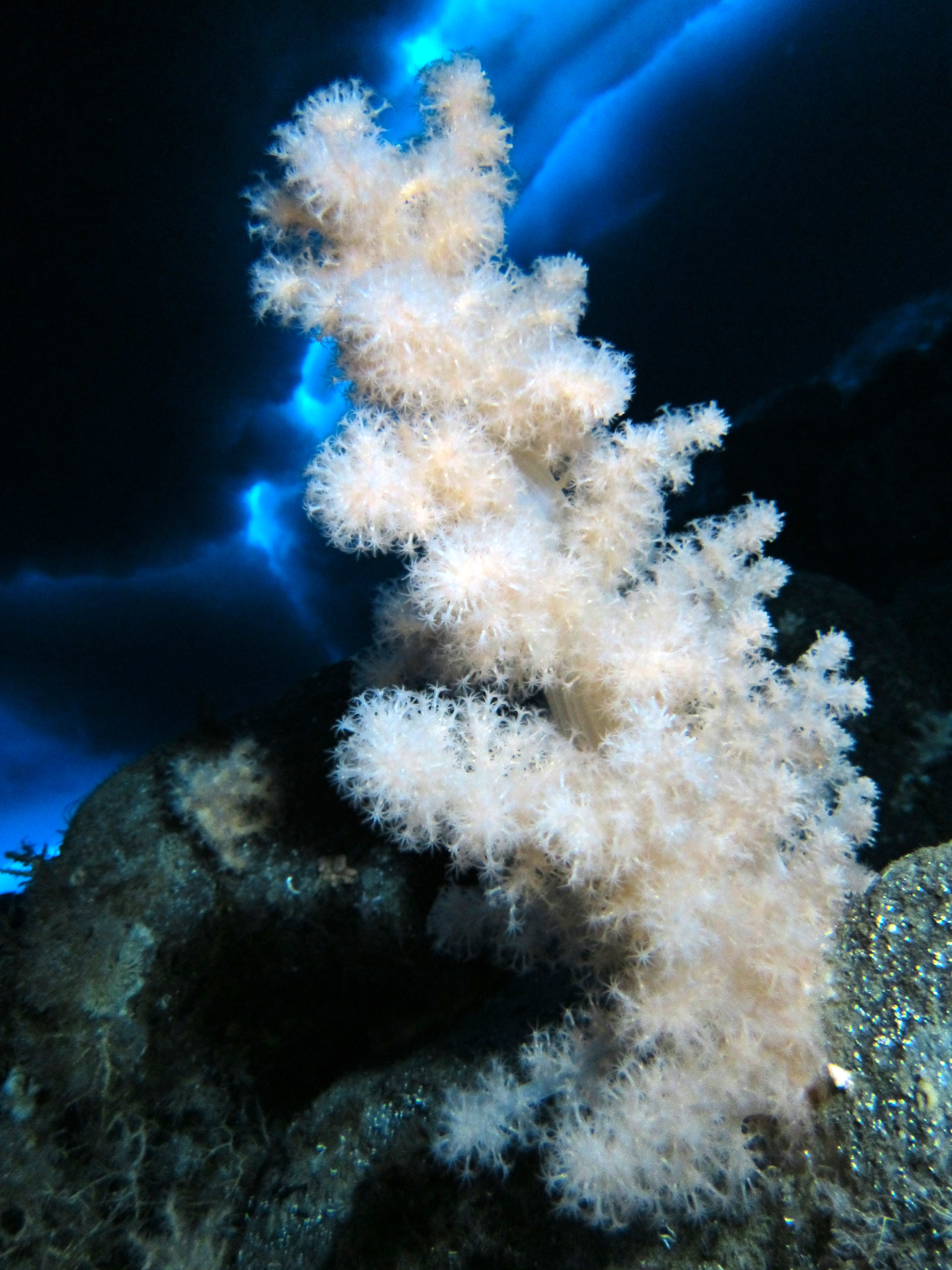
Gersemia antarctica (a soft coral) growing in the water near McMurdo

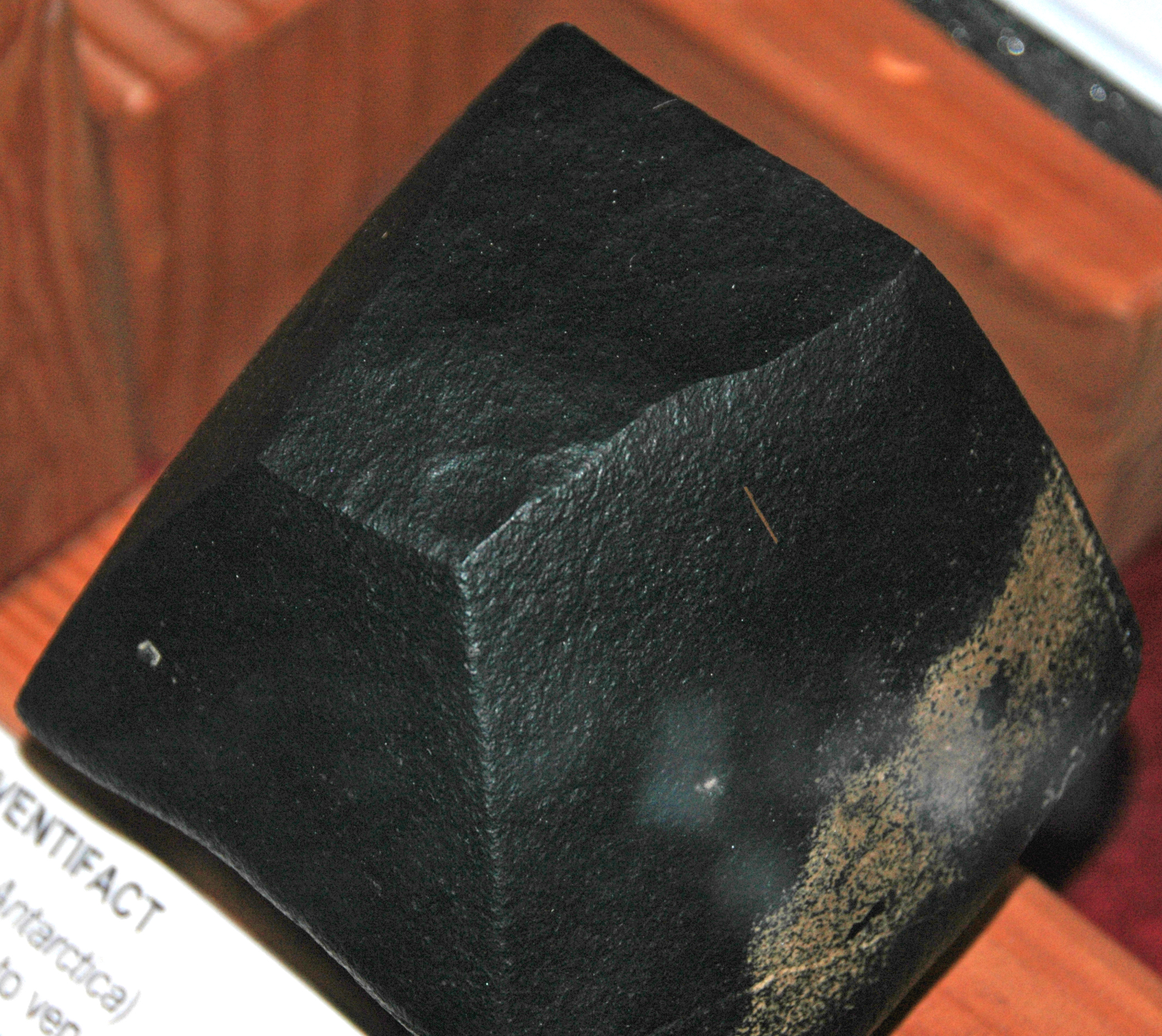
A basalt ventifact from the McMurdo Dry Valleys to the west

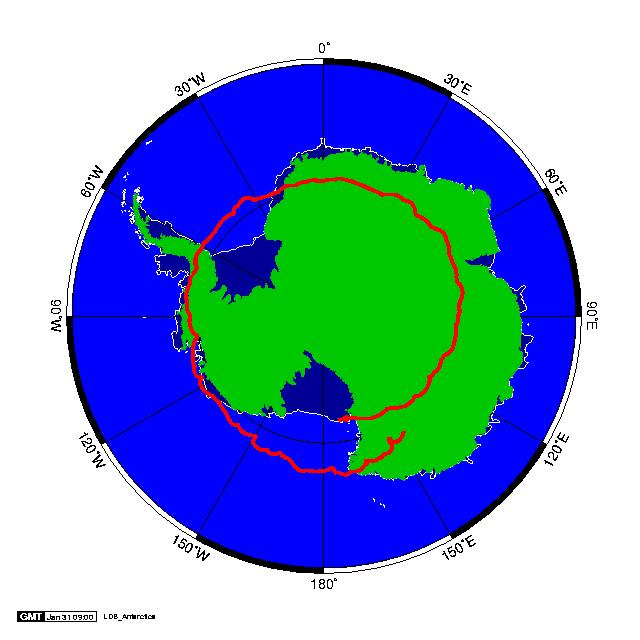
MAXIS (MeV Auroral X-ray Imaging and Spectroscopy) balloon track. A high altitude balloon launched from McMurdo's William Field in 2000 was an X-ray observatory

== Chalet and governance ==
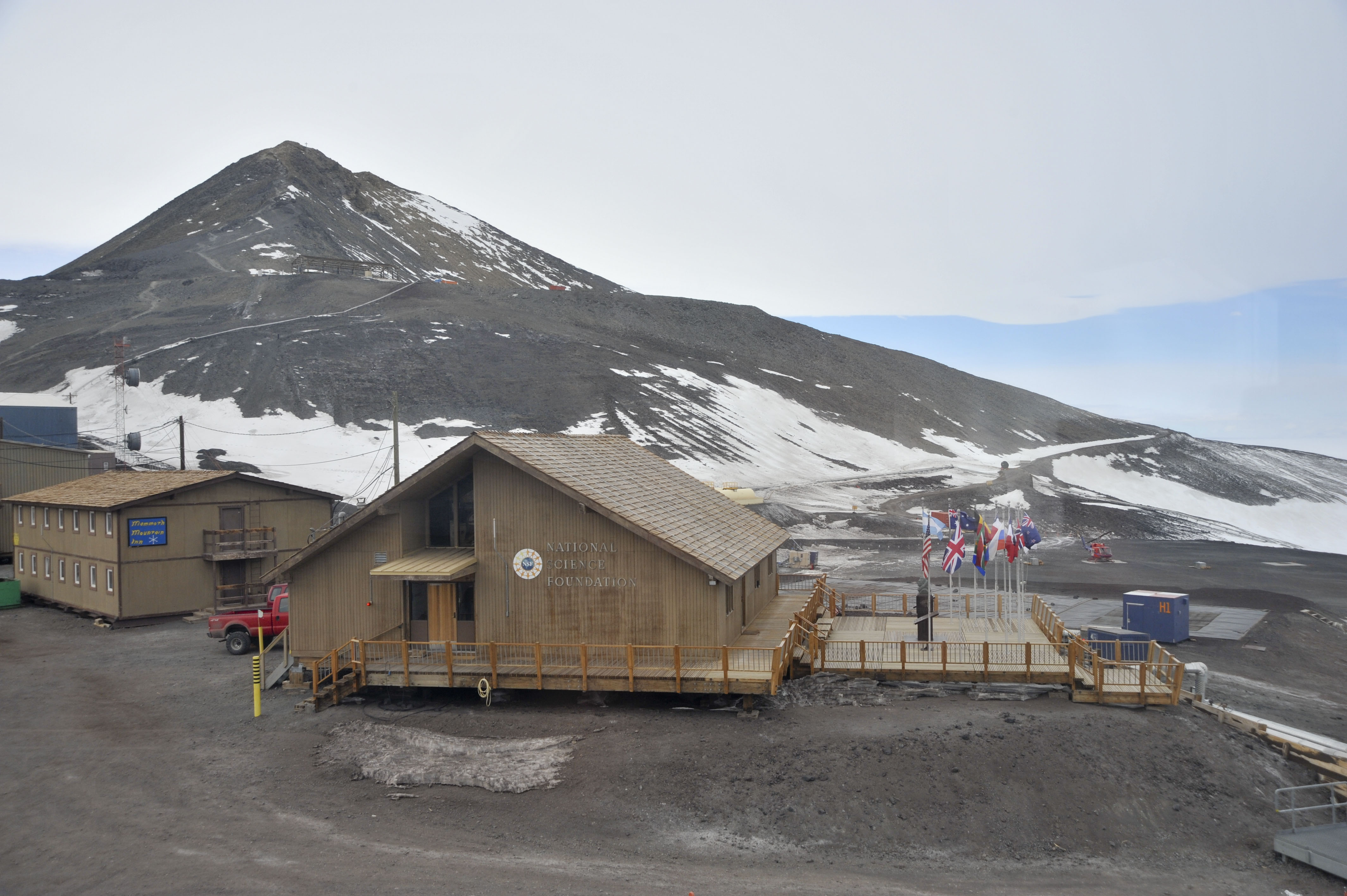
The National Science Foundation offices in the Chalet. To the right is the monument to Richard E. Byrd.

The Chalet at McMurdo Station houses the National Science Foundation offices and serves as the administrative center for the U.S. Antarctic Program. The current building was built in the 1969–70 season, replacing a smaller, older building. The Chalet was built by Holmes & Narver, Inc.; it was the first civilian building constructed at McMurdo. In the 2010s, it was considered for the existing Chalet to be made into the McMurdo coffee house and the offices moved to a new building. In the early 2020s, it was again planned to transition the Chalet to an additional morale boosting space, possibly with a snack and drink area. In the 21st century, the Chalet is also a place where visitors get an orientation speech when arriving at McMurdo. Next to the Chalet is the Richard E. Byrd memorial, which was established in 1965. The memorial is listed as Antarctic Historic site HSM-54, and is surrounded by flagpoles with the 12 founding signers of the Antarctic Treaty.

The Antarctica Treaty leaves law and governance to each nation; at McMurdo Station law enforcement is carried out by the U.S. Marshal Service, through an agreement between the NSF and the District of Hawaii since 1989. Under the 1959 Antarctic Treaty, ratified by 53 nations, persons accused of a crime in Antarctica are subject to punishment by their own country.

== Historic sites and memorials ==
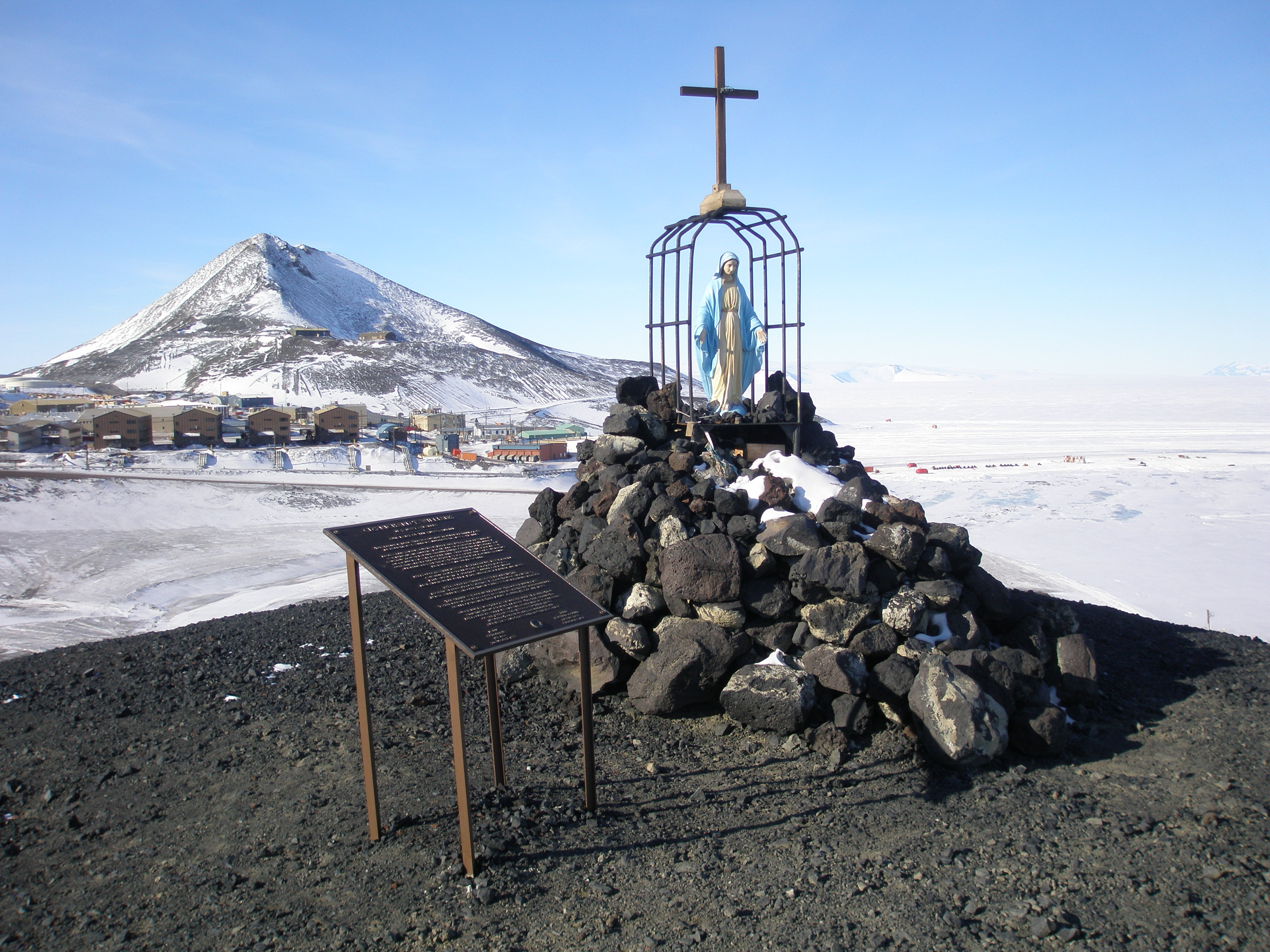
Our Lady of the Snows shrine, built in 1956 after a bulldozer fell through the ice, claiming the life of its driver

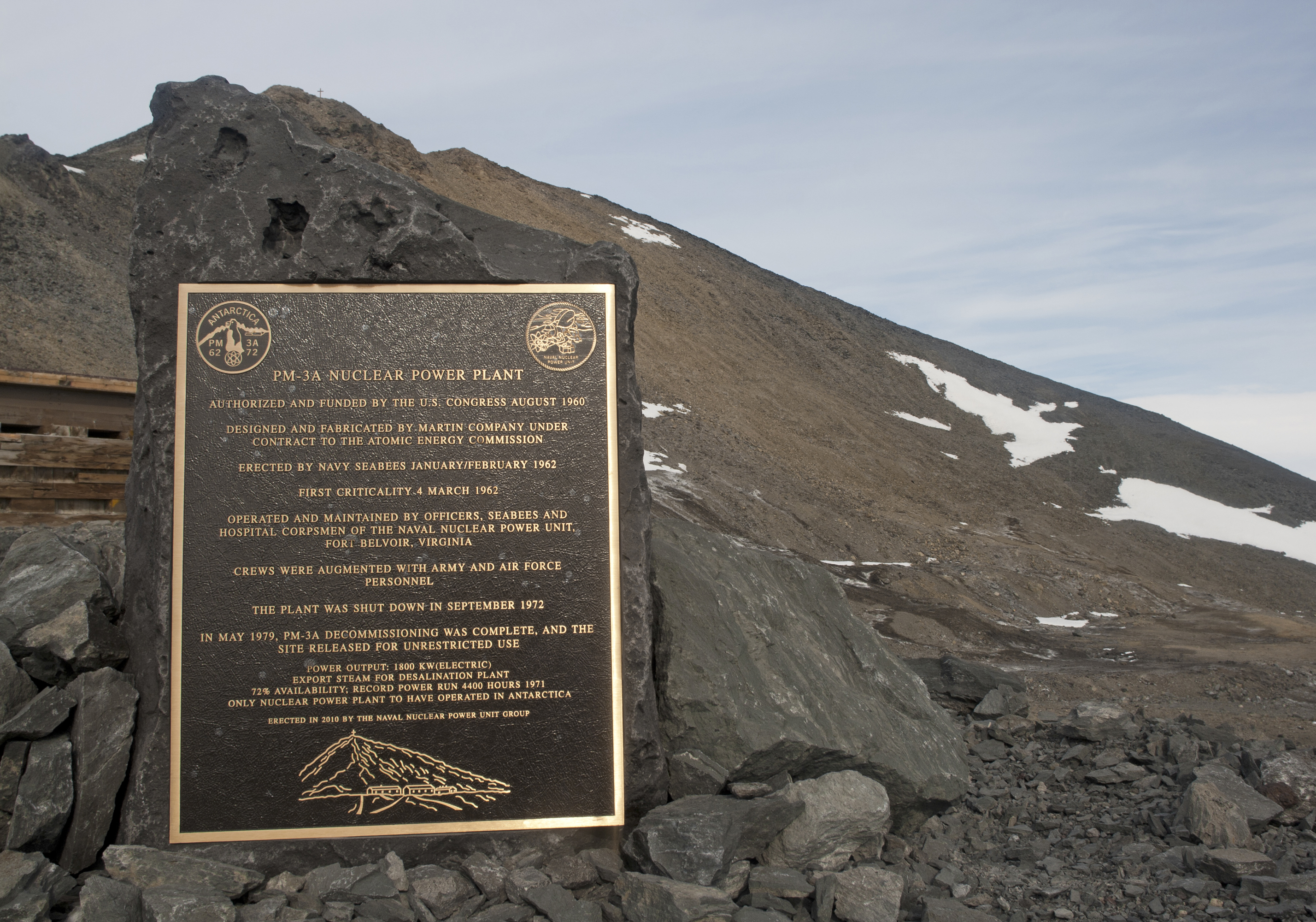
Nuclear reactor commemorative plaque

The Richard E. Byrd Historic Monument was erected at McMurdo in 1965. It includes a bronze bust on black marble, 150 cm × 60 cm (5 ft × 2 ft) square, on a wooden platform, bearing inscriptions describing the polar exploration achievements of Richard E. Byrd. It has been designated a Historic Site or Monument (HSM 54), following a proposal by the United States to the Antarctic Treaty Consultative Meeting.

There is a memorial to Capt. Robert Falcon Scott and four others who died on their way back from the South Pole in 1912; the memorial was erected in 1913 after the decedents' remains were found. The Antarctic biologist and explorer Edward Wilson also died on that expedition.

There is also a memorial to a construction worker, the U.S. Navy SeaBee Richard T. William, who died in 1956 when his bulldozer went through the ice. The memorial, a statue of the Virgin Mary, is called Our Lady of the Snows.

A bronze nuclear reactor commemorative plaque is secured to a large vertical rock halfway up the west side of Observation Hill, at the former site of the PM-3A nuclear power reactor at McMurdo Station. It has been designated a Historic Site or Monument (HSM 85), following a proposal by the United States to the Antarctic Treaty Consultative Meeting.

North of the station can be found Scott's Hut on Cape Evans (Ross Island), as well as Shackleton's Hut on Cape Royds.

One of the oldest buildings still standing at McMurdo Station is Hut 10, the residence of the base commander during the station's Navy period. It was built in 1957 and remodeled in 1988.

== Post office ==
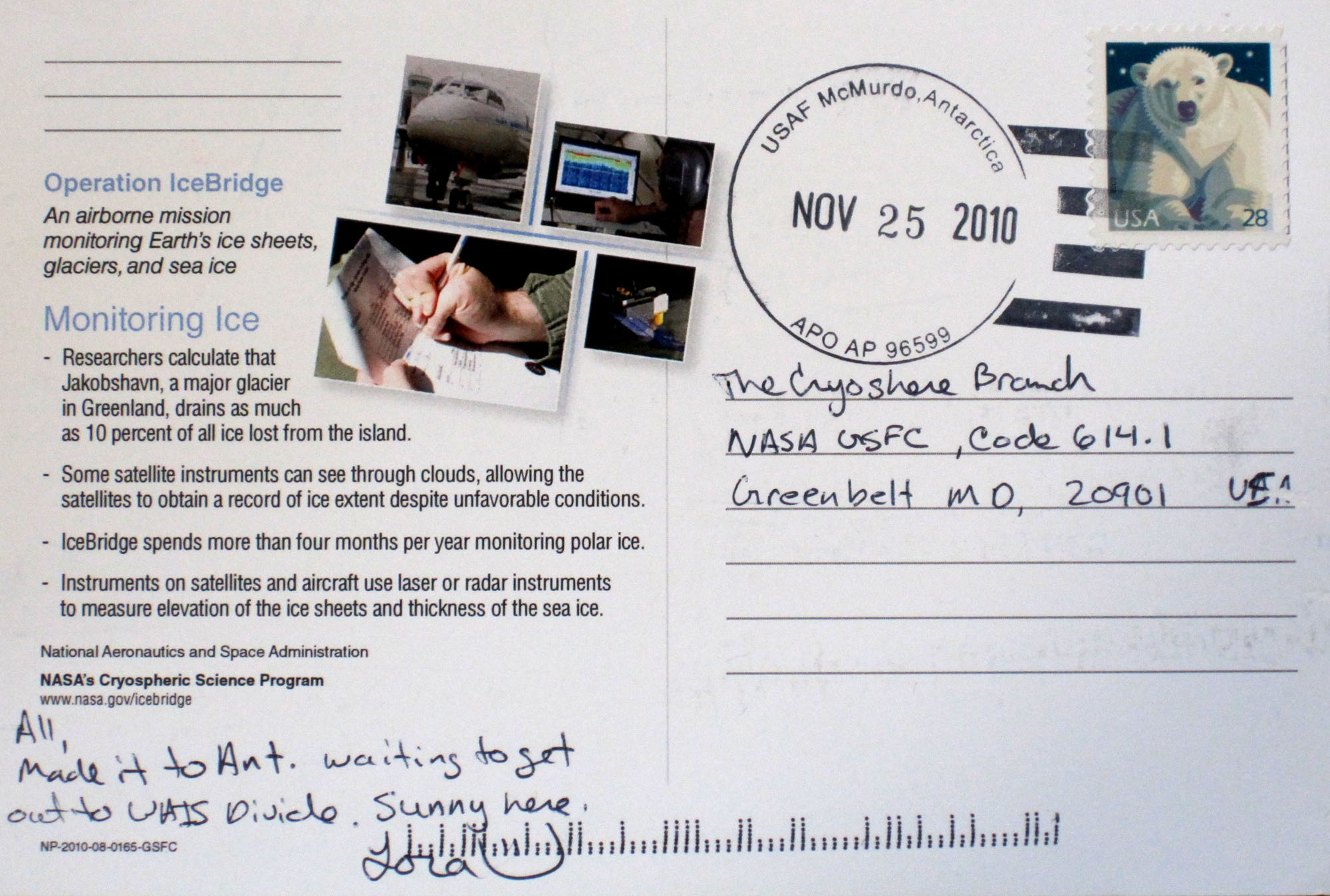
Post card sent from McMurdo to a NASA center in Maryland to the McMurdo Station

McMurdo has a post office in building 140, formally called Movement Control Center (MCC), it has the post office, mail room, and office supplies. Mail going to the south pole station also passes through it, and there are certain restrictions on mail in terms of content and timing (such as the period where the base is not visited during winter). It does have a philatelic mail program for those seeking to acquire an Antarctic postage cancellation.

The Postal address of the station is APO AP 96599-9998.

== Medical facility ==
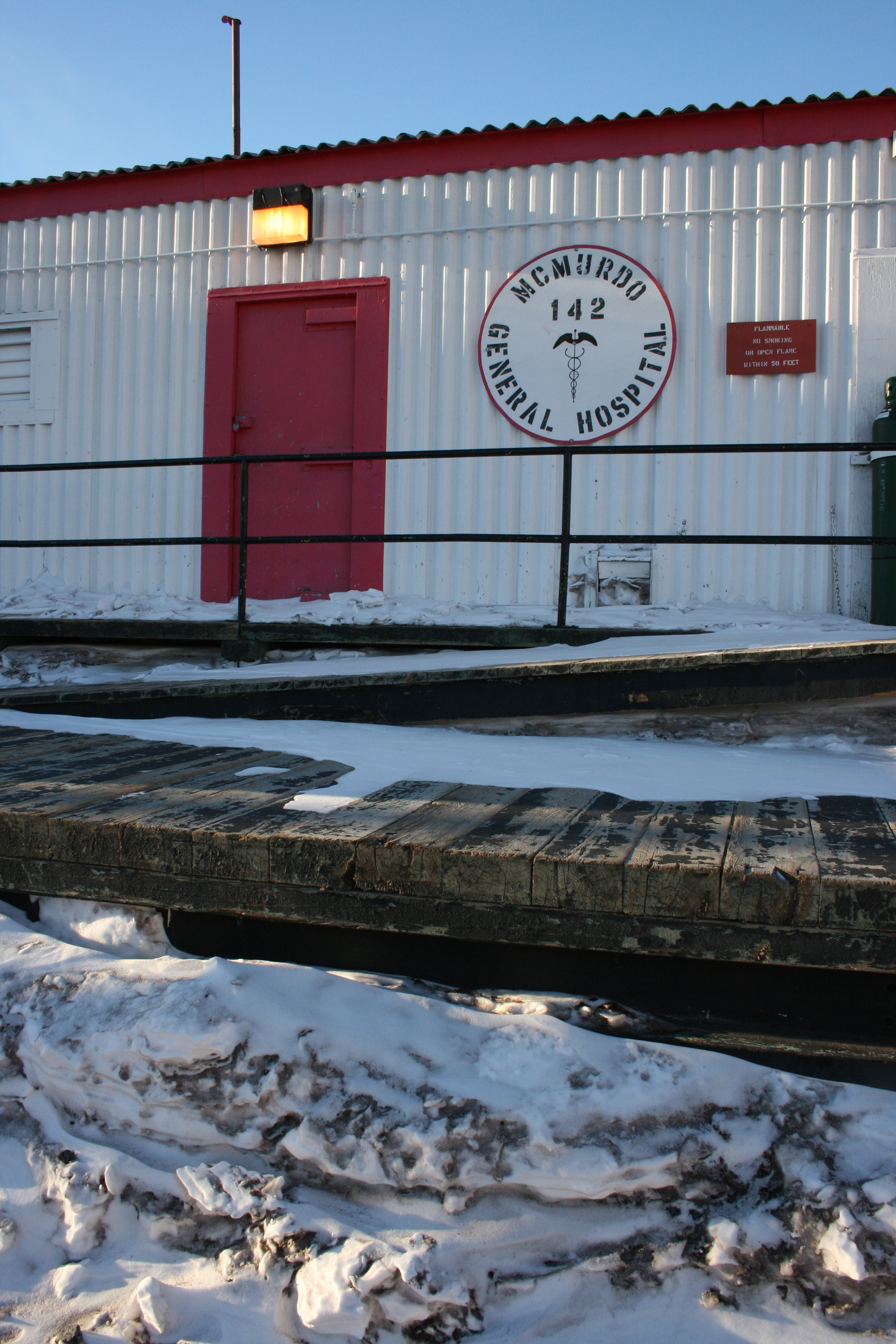
McMurdo Station Hospital

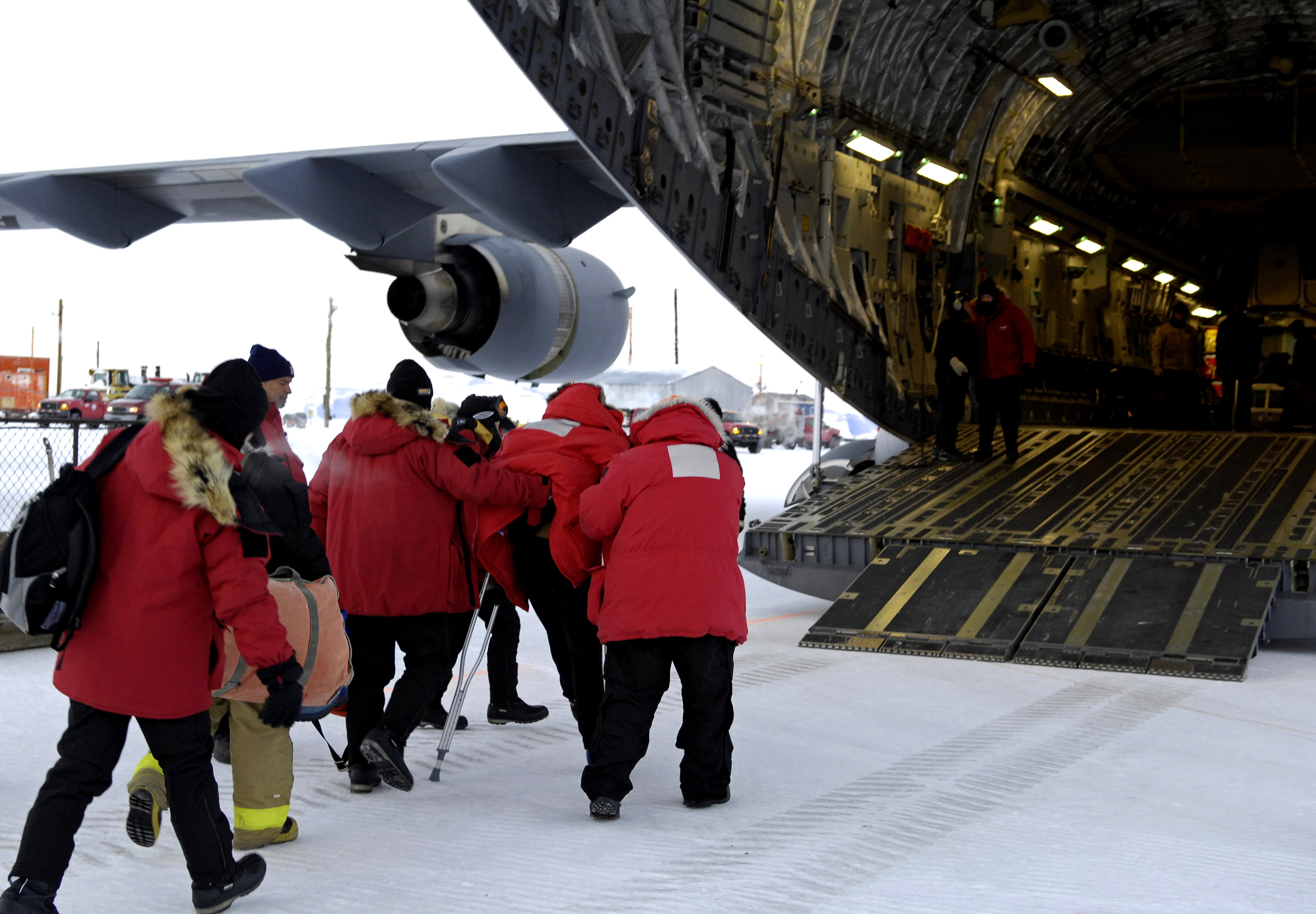
Medivac in August 2007

Building 142, located next to the central hub (Building 155), houses McMurdo General Hospital. The facility, staffed by a small team, primarily handles minor health issues or stabilizes patients for evacuation. It also prepares for mass casualty events, such as plane crashes, by training volunteers and employing techniques like a "walking blood bank" to manage large numbers of patients. Cold related dangers at the Station include hypothermia, frostbite, snow blindness, sunburn, windburn, tent eye, carbon monoxide poisoning, and trench foot.

The facility has four beds that can sustain critical care for several days, but advanced surgery is not available, though the exact mix of beds and level of care has varied over time and also seasonally. At one point it had three emergency beds and three in-patient beds. Usually a doctor is on staff supported by a few residents and/or nurses during the time when the base population can grow to over one thousand people. The facility can take X-rays, do EKG monitoring, basic lab work, basic dental work, but has no blood bank; for serious conditions the focus is on doing a medical evacuation. The facility also has a decompression chamber, supporting medical care for scuba divers if they get decompression sickness (aka "the bends").

An example of a medical evacuation occurred in 2024, when a patient was flown to New Zealand, where they recovered. Medical evacuations in winter are comparatively rare, with other notable exceptions occurring in 2001, 2003, and 2025. The winter-time evacuations are difficult for a number of reasons, such as the 24 hour darkness, weather, and extreme cold, which can be cold enough to freeze jet fuel.

== Life ==
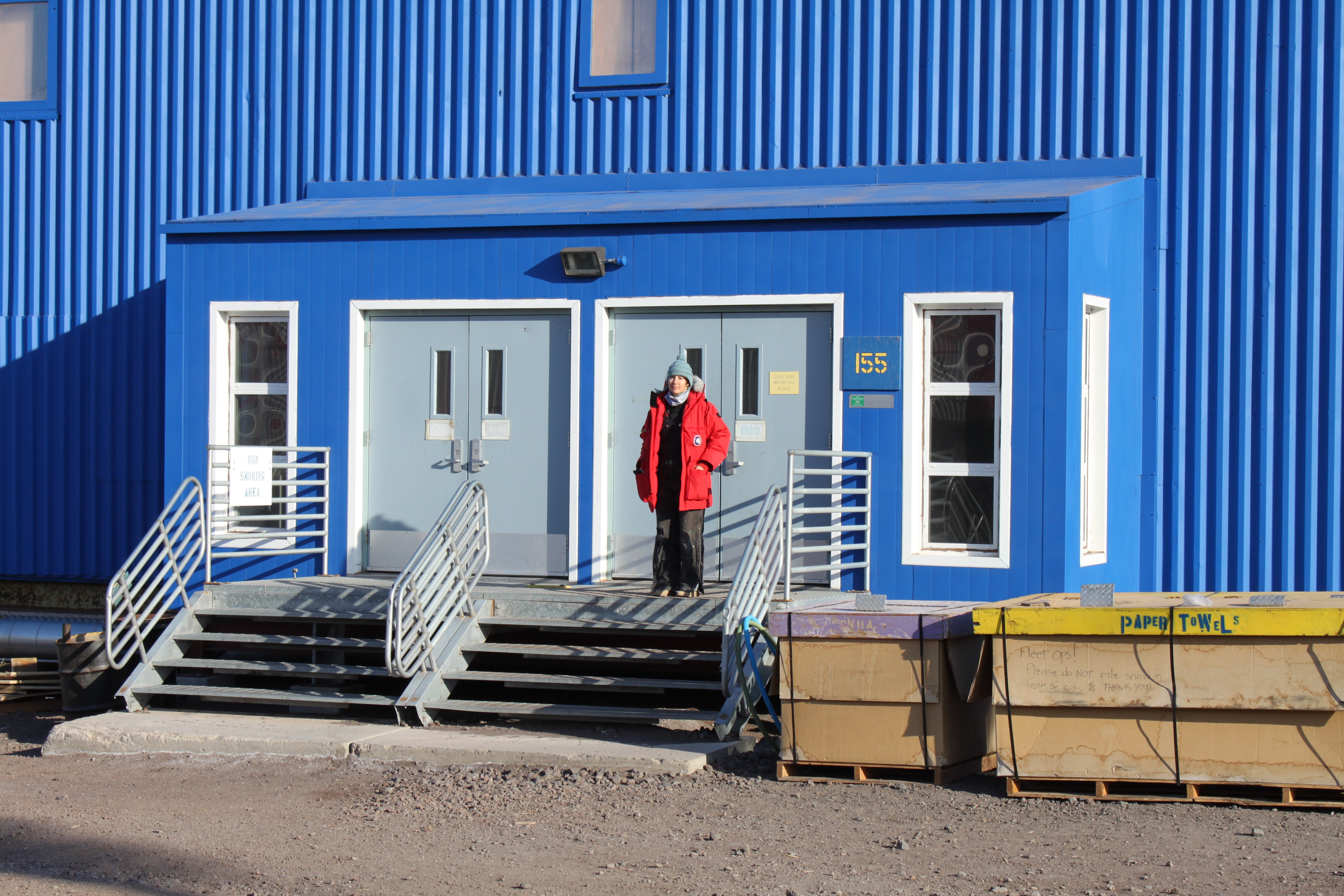
Building 155 Entrance: Hub of McMurdo life; has offices, dorms, stores, and the cafeteria "galley"

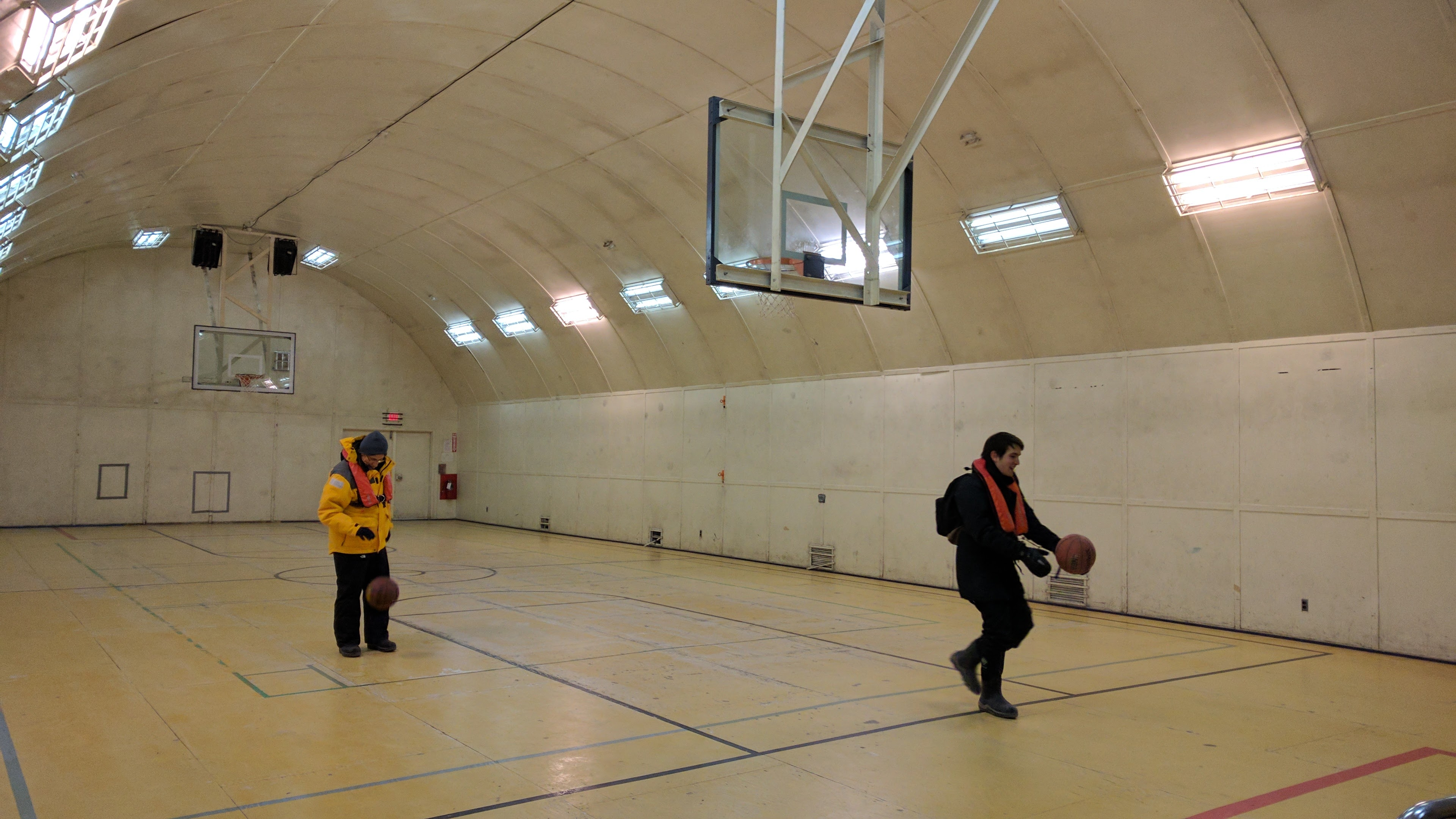
McMurdo Station gymnasium

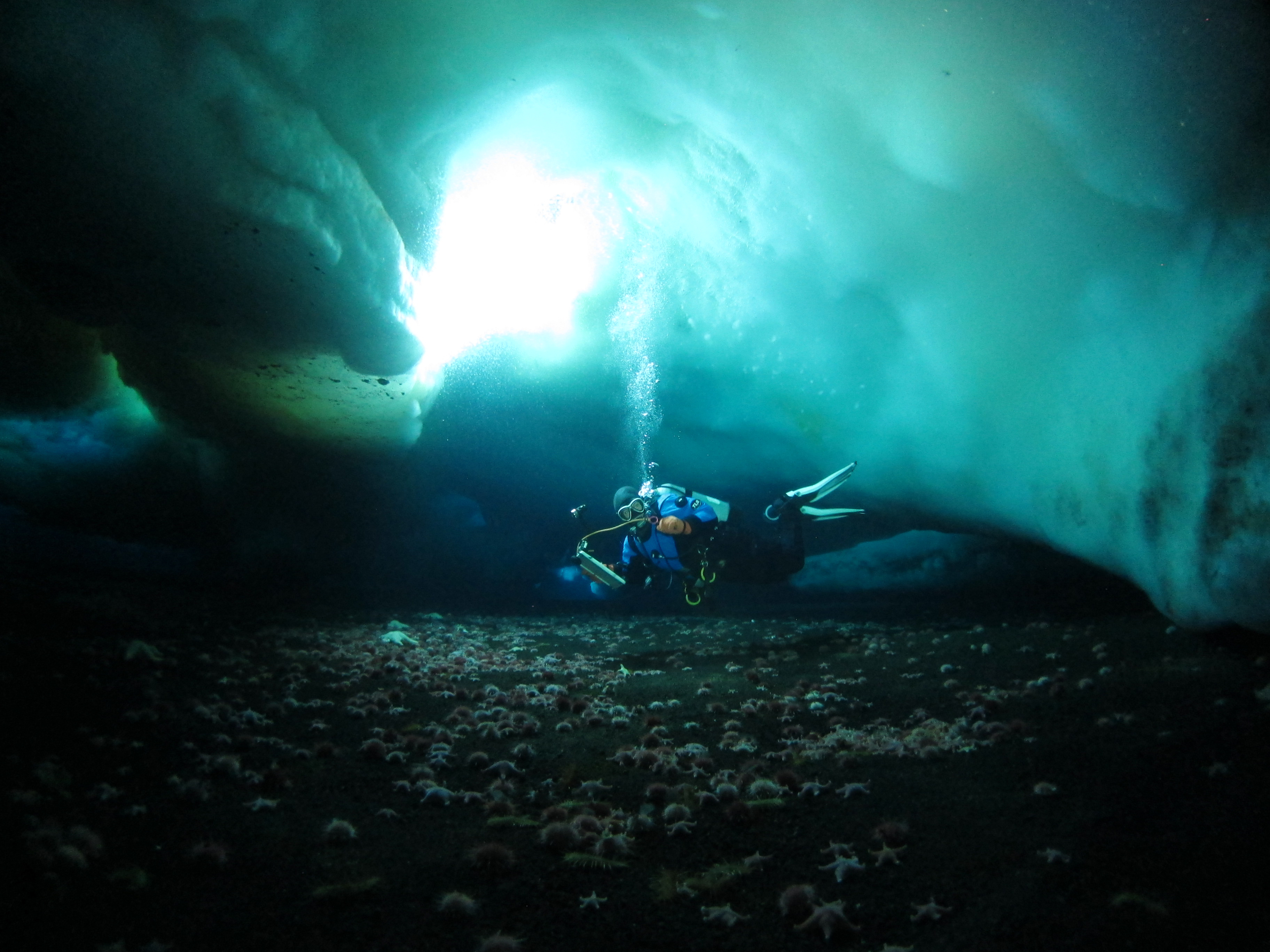
Ice diver explores McMurdo Sound (Erebus Bay), 2017

Life in McMurdo Station is influenced by seasonal daylight. The "season" begins with the first sunrise in August, marking the start of polar dawn, and the arrival of the first flights. As daylight increases, station activity intensifies. By October, the last sunset occurs, and 24-hour daylight begins. More staff and researchers arrive, raising the station's population. As the sea ice melts later in the season, icebreakers clear a path to McMurdo harbor, typically by December or January. Staff and resources flow through McMurdo to research projects in Antarctica, including the opening of the ice road to the South Pole and ski cargo planes bringing supplies to that base. Around February, the last flights fly out as the season draws to a close, there are lowering temperatures and the first sunset of the year in late February. The last sunrise before deep winter occurs in late April followed by a period of daily twilight. In the polar night, historically, travel to the mainland is curtailed and the number of personnel is reduced. In the 2010s there was some success increasing focus on doing staff changes and resupply in June and July, though this means landing in darkness in very cold temperatures.

Once a year, around New Year's Day, the most southern music festival, Icestock, is organized, with performers being from the station and Scott Base.

There is an interfaith church called the Chapel of the Snows that hosts Protestant and Catholic services, as well as secular community organizations such as sobriety groups. One of the main buildings for life in McMurdo is number 155: this has a long indoor corridor called the "highway", with offices, dorms, barbershop, computer lab, station store, and the main cafeteria ("the galley") – the hub of life at the research station. McMurdo's cafeteria is nicknamed the "galley", like on a ship, due to the influence of Navy in McMurdo's history.

From 1961 to 2009, there was a bowling alley with a manual pin-setting machine; the building was demolished due to a structural failure and has not been replaced. The 2-lane alley was housed in a hut, and originally used penguin pins.

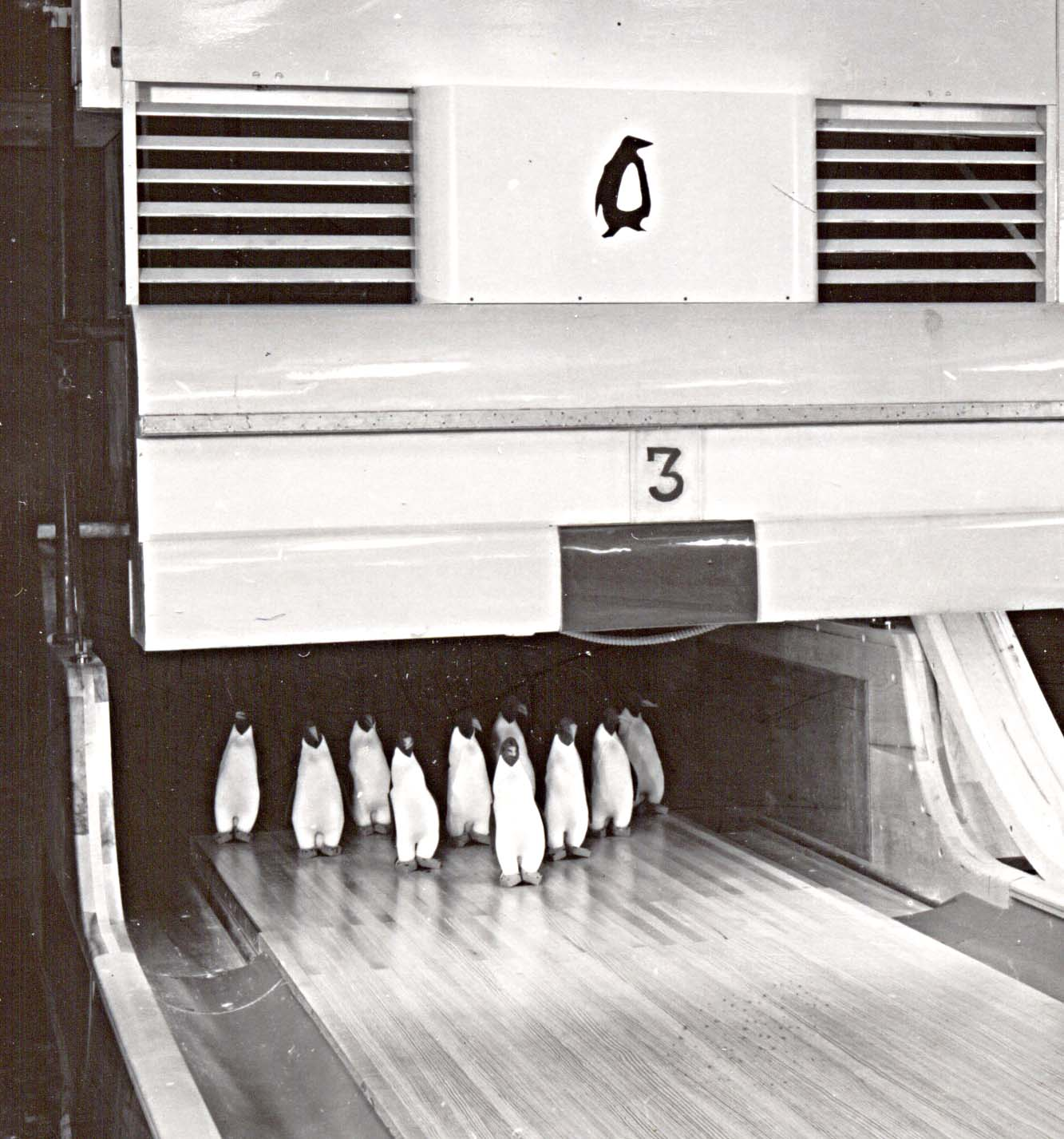
McMurdo's penguin shaped bowling pins, July 1961

The historic pin-setting machine was brought out for the "McMurdo Museum" in 2022, a historical event remembering the history of the station. The event also displayed 1960s wetsuits (replaced in the 1970s with drysuits) and the old Caterpillar D4 tractor called Marcia.

McMurdo had the largest greenhouse in Antarctica from 1989 to 2011. It started out as 50 m^{2} and expanded to 66 m^{2} in 1994. The plants were grown indoors hydroponically (that is to say, using water rather than soil). The greenhouse could produce about 100 kg (220 lb) a month at peak production, including lettuce greens, spinach, arugula, chard, tomatoes, peppers, cucumbers, and herbs. It was enough to give the over-winter staff a salad once a week but was more limited for the summer population at McMurdo. The greenhouse originally had glass panes, but switched to being indoors because it was more energy efficient in winter. Although it offered a limited supply, people liked to be around the plants and would sometimes come with a bottle of wine and their dinner to hang out there.

In 2016, it was discovered that McMurdo had a collection of 20,000 vinyl records, dating back to the 1960s when it had its own radio station.

Traditionally, there were several bars at McMurdo, which were noted social centers of the station. However, alcoholic drinks are no longer sold at the bar, even though a ration of alcohol is available to buy at the station store; the bar locations are now BYOB. For the 2023–4 season, an alcohol-free recreation zone was to be created, and several other recreation and morale spaces are planned.

McMurdo Station has a gym for indoor physical activity, which used to be a club-style bar called the Acey-Duecy club during the Navy period. Bars were notably divided by rank, with separate clubs for enlisted, officers, and chiefs, with civilians welcome in any of the places.

It is advised to avoid having food outside at McMurdo Station during certain times of the year, as skua birds, which are opportunistic hunters and scavengers, are known to snatch food from people's hands; they are often compared to large grey seagulls.

Hiking outside the base is possible, but has serious dangers. For example, in 1986, two base staff died coming back from a hike to Castle Rock, when they fell into a crevasse after going off the marked trail. The weather is both fickle and harsh: when a storm comes visibility can drop to zero with near hurricane-force winds, driving snow in subzero temperatures for hours. A five-hour storm in 2017 had sustained winds of 72 mph (116 kph, 63 knots) at base, but out on the ice winds were nearly 100 mph (160 kph, 86 knots) with gusts up to 172 mph (277 kph, 150 knots). This kind of weather poses serious hazards and paying attention to weather forecasts is important for safety; in difficult conditions movement is limited to escorted travel with trained search and rescue personnel and short trips between buildings with ropes. Residents take survival training courses, with techniques such as building an igloo for an emergency shelter (see Antarctica Weather Danger Classification).

== Points of interest ==
McMurdo Station is on the southern end of Hut Point Peninsula on Ross Island; the base itself has many buildings for different functions. Nearby are many historical or important locations.

There are some historical cabins dating to the early 1900s, geological features on Ross Island, as well as an assortment of memorials, plaques, and novelties on Hut Point. In the wider region are many imposing natural features including the Ross Ice Shelf, Mount Discovery, and Mount Erebus, and phenomena such as the southern lights aurora can be seen. Wildlife is very limited, but some types that may be seen include penguins, seals, whales, and seabirds, depending on the time of year. Underwater near the base there is a variety of sealife. One of the unique devices at McMurdo Station is the observation tube, which is a tube that extends beneath the ice with windows allowing the subsurface to be observed without scuba diving.

Igloos are sometimes built near the base, usually for survival training courses.

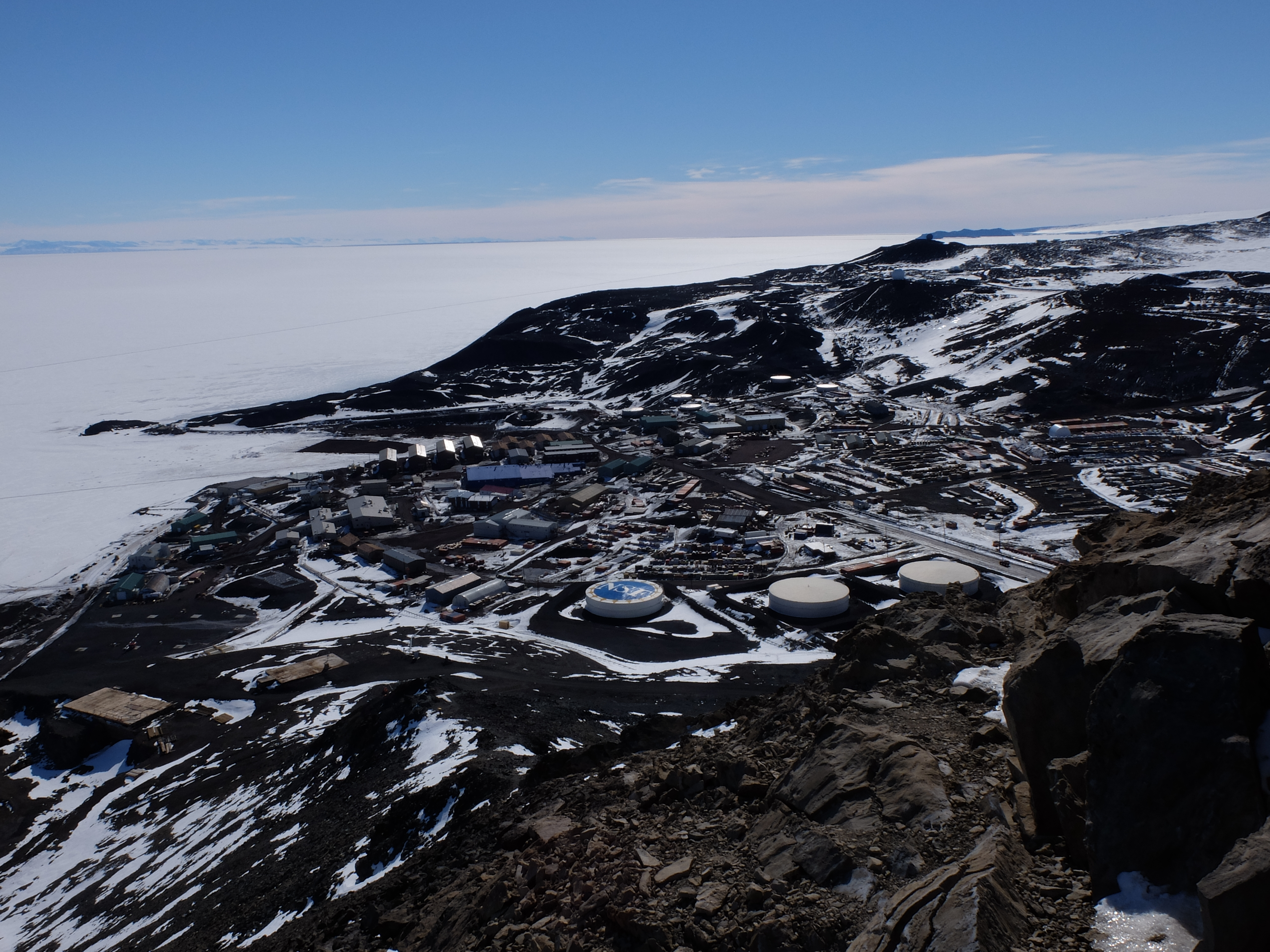
McMurdo Station as seen from Observation Hill in 2014

Facilities at or near the station include:

- Building 155 (hub of activity with the "Galley" (cafeteria), offices, dorm, etc.)
- Albert P. Crary Science and Engineering Center (CSEC)
  - Salt Water Aquarium
- Chapel of the Snows Interdenominational Chapel
- Discovery Hut, built during Scott's 1901–1903 expedition (historic site)
- Memorial plaque to three airmen killed in 1946 while surveying the territory
- Ross Island Disc Golf Course
- Gallagher's (formerly Erebus Club)
- Southern Exposure Bar (formerly Chief's Club)
- Coffee House (ex-Officer's Club)
- "Hotel California" dorm
- Waste Water Treatment Plant
- Chalet (NSF offices)
- Winter Quarters Bay (harbor)
- Observation tube (seasonal)
- Observation Hill (overlooks station)
- Ross Island Earth Station
- Post Office
- General Hospital

Nearby to varying degrees:

- Scott Base (about 3 km away by road through "the gap")
- McMurdo Ground Station (MGS) (NASA-NSF)
- Arrival Heights Laboratory (ASPA)
- Hut Point Peninsula (various areas such as Arrival Bay, Crater Hill, Pram Point)
- Scott's Hut (Cape Evans) (historic site)
- Shackleton's Hut (Cape Royds) (historic site)
- Lower Erebus Hut (near Mount Erebus)
- Infrasonic Array at Windless Bight
- Long Duration Balloon (about 8 miles southeast from McMurdo)
- Williams Field airport (ice runway)
- Phoenix Airfield (compacted snow runway)
- Castle Rock (north of the base by trail)
- Erebus Glacier Tongue and its ice caves.(Glacier to the north extending west into McMurdo Sound)
- Cape Crozier Hut
- Mount Erebus (to the north on Ross Island)
- Mount Terror (to the northeast on Ross Island)
- McMurdo Dry Valleys (Across sound to the west)
- Ross Ice Shelf
- White Island (to the south)
- Black Island (Island to the south, accessible by sea ice road in winter)
- Brown Peninsula
- Discovery Mountain (Southward)
- Byrd Glacier

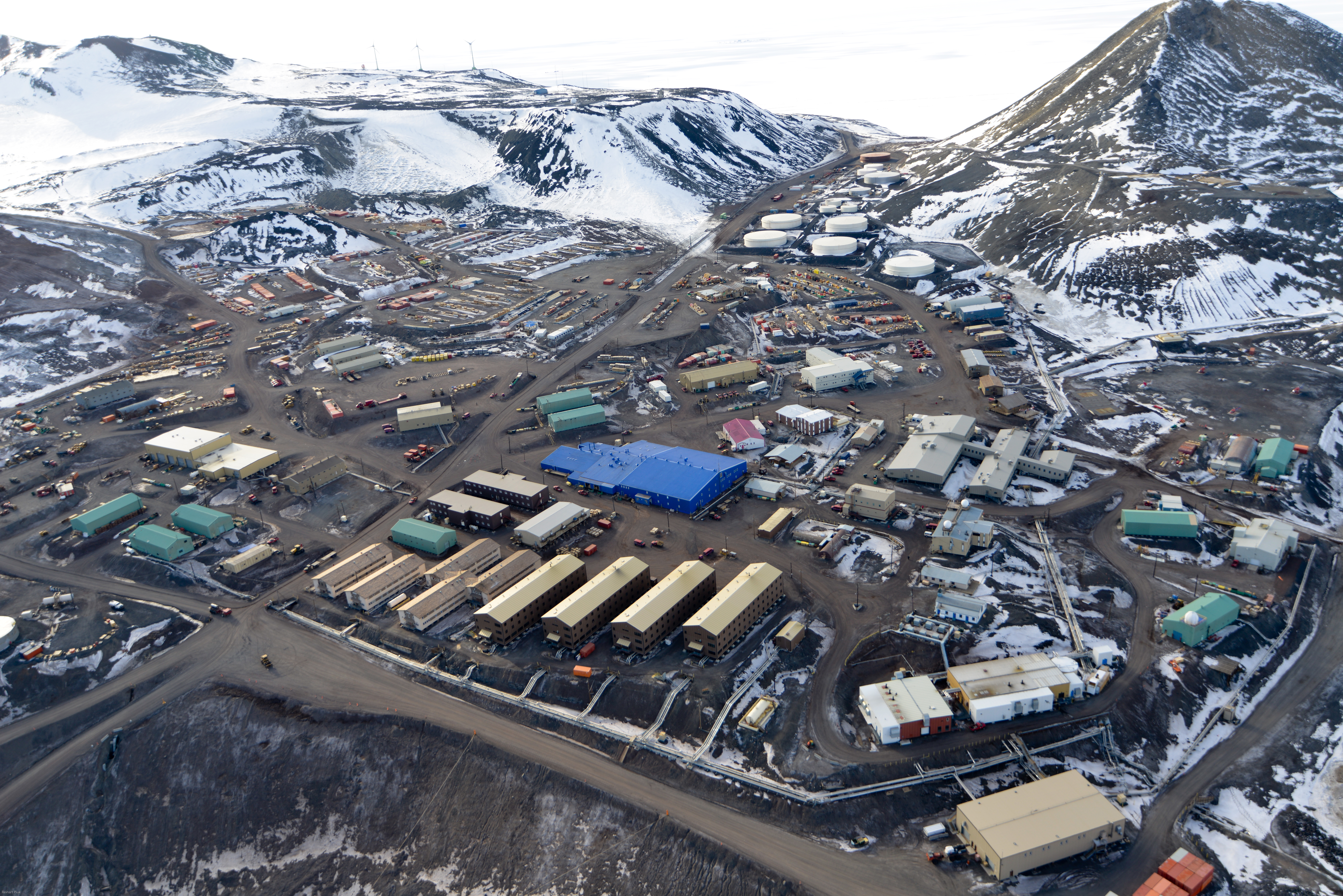
McMurdo Base, 2013. Building 155 is the blue building in center

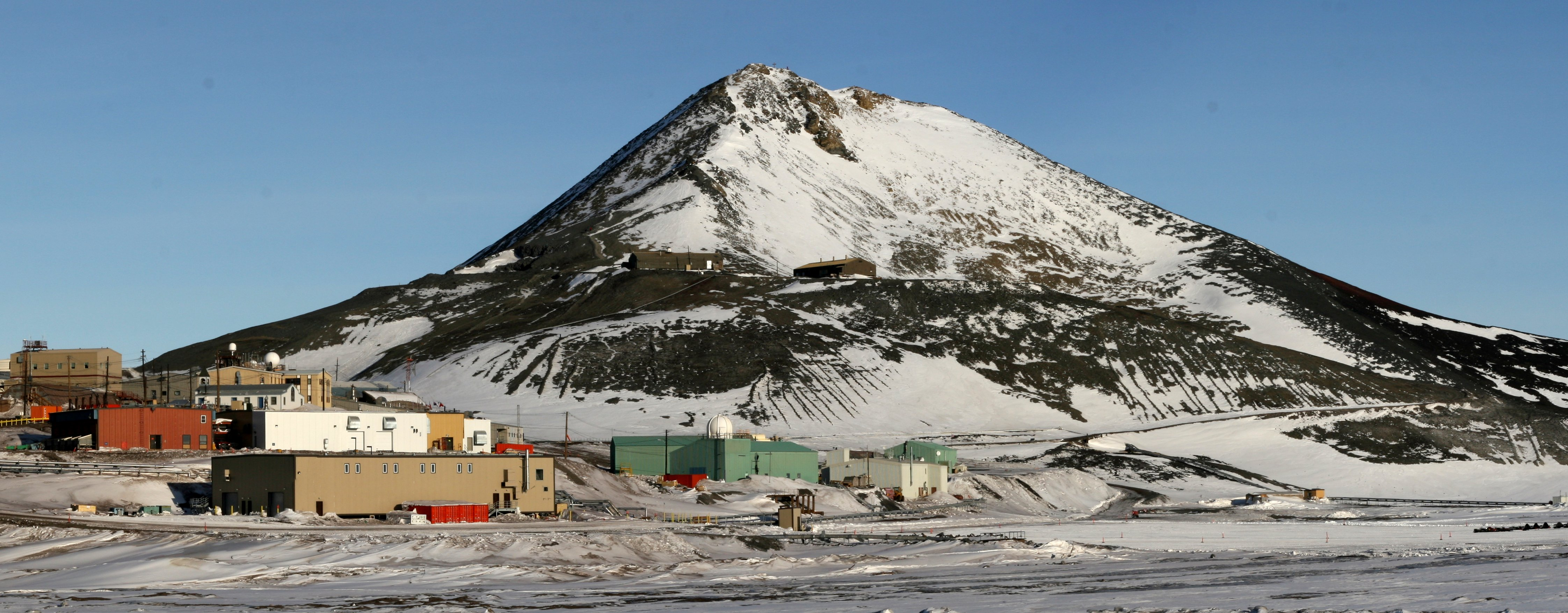
Observation hill overlooks McMurdo Station, 2006.

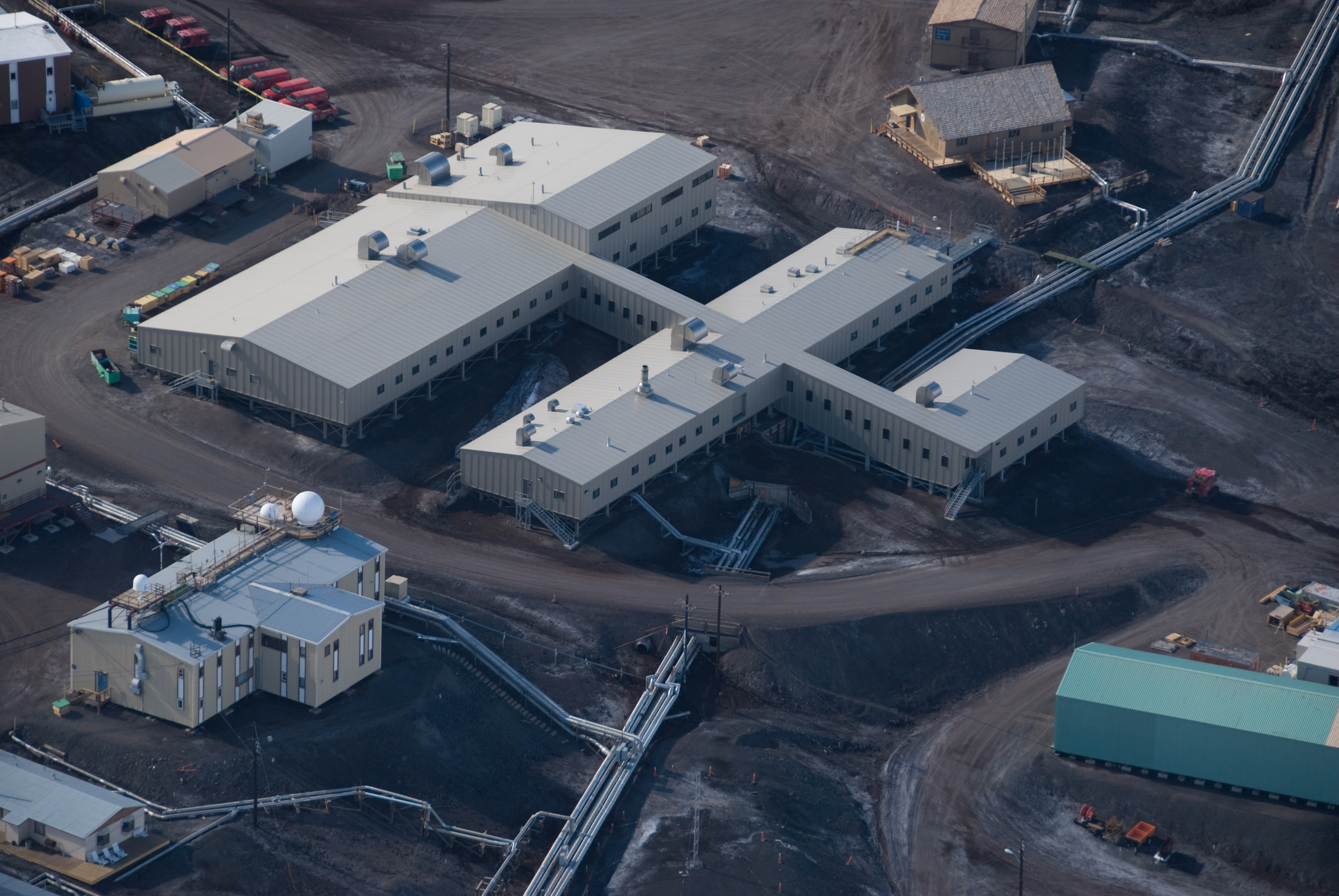
Albert P. Crary Science and Engineering Center

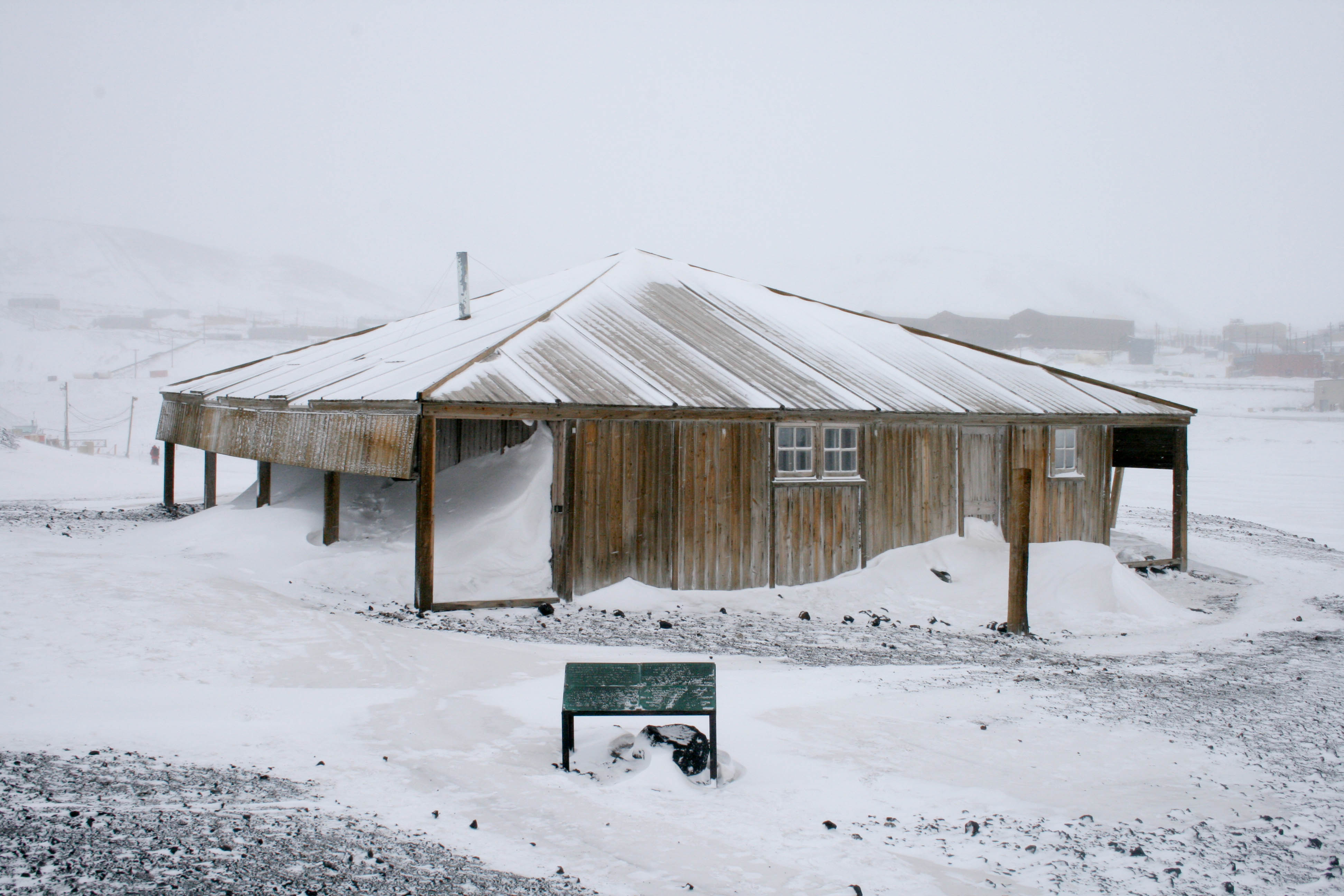
Discovery Hut, erected in 1901 by Robert Falcon Scott's 1901-1904 Discovery expedition.

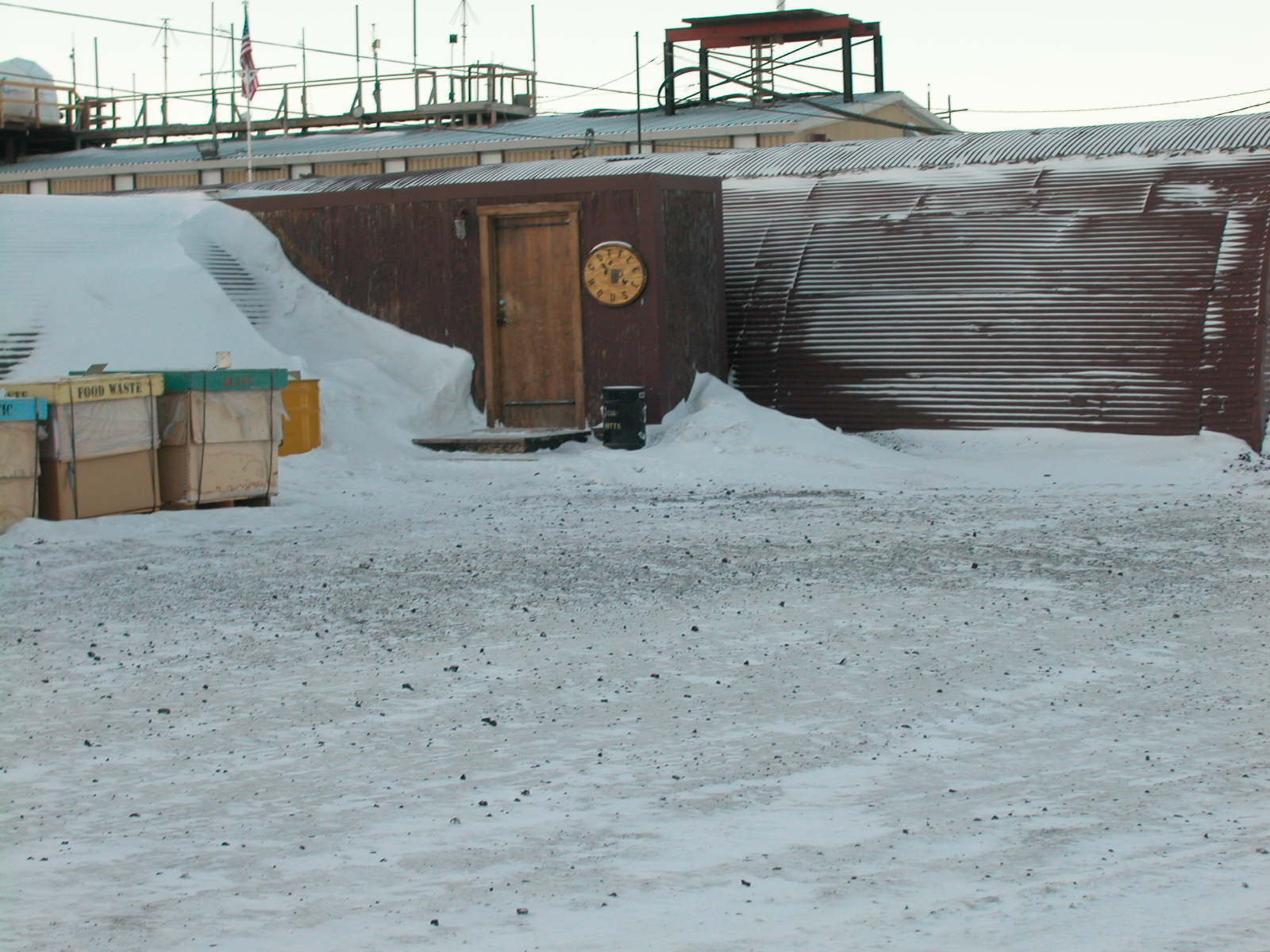
Building 76 is the Coffee House, formerly an officer's club (in the Navy period)

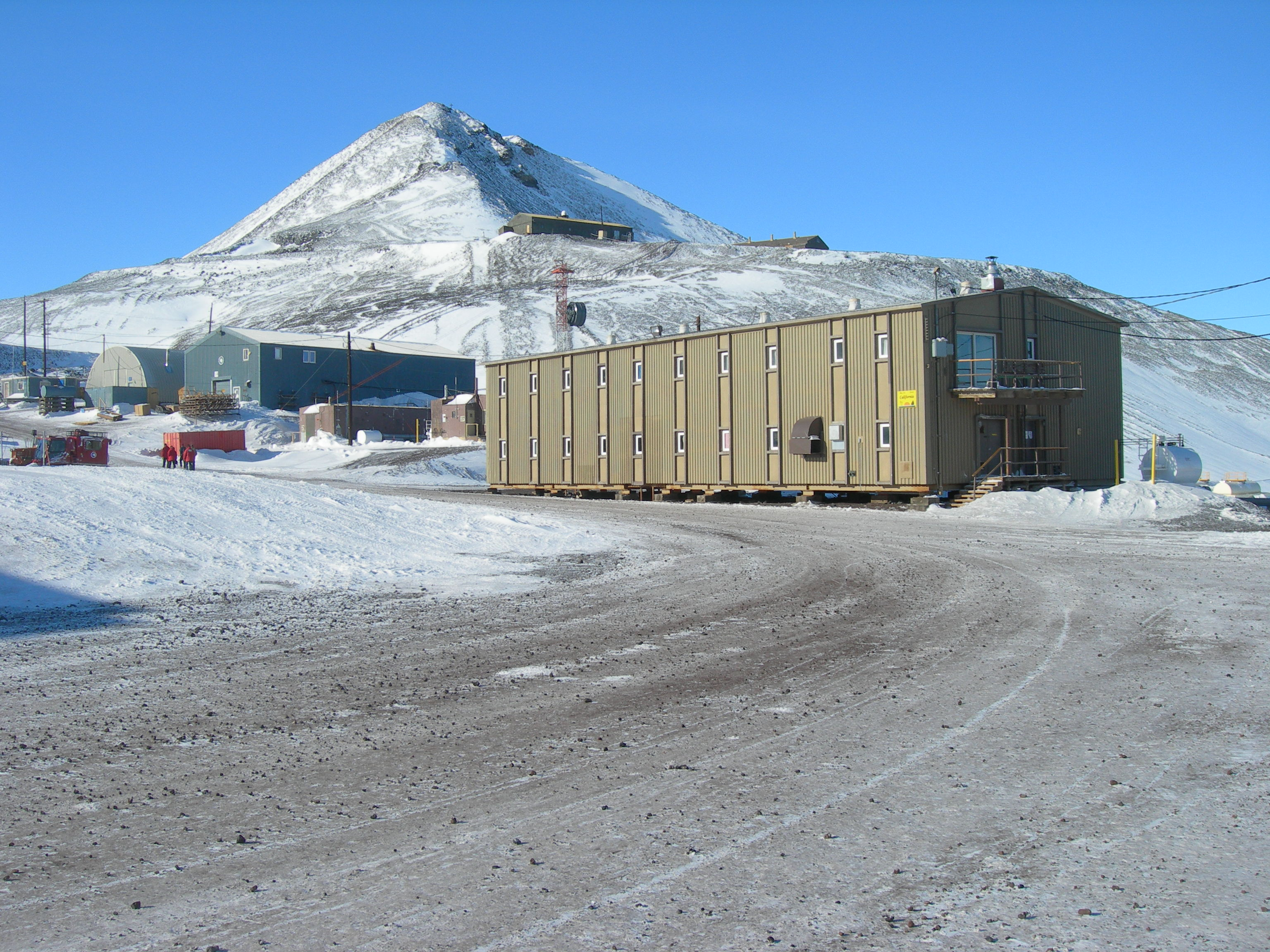
Hotel California

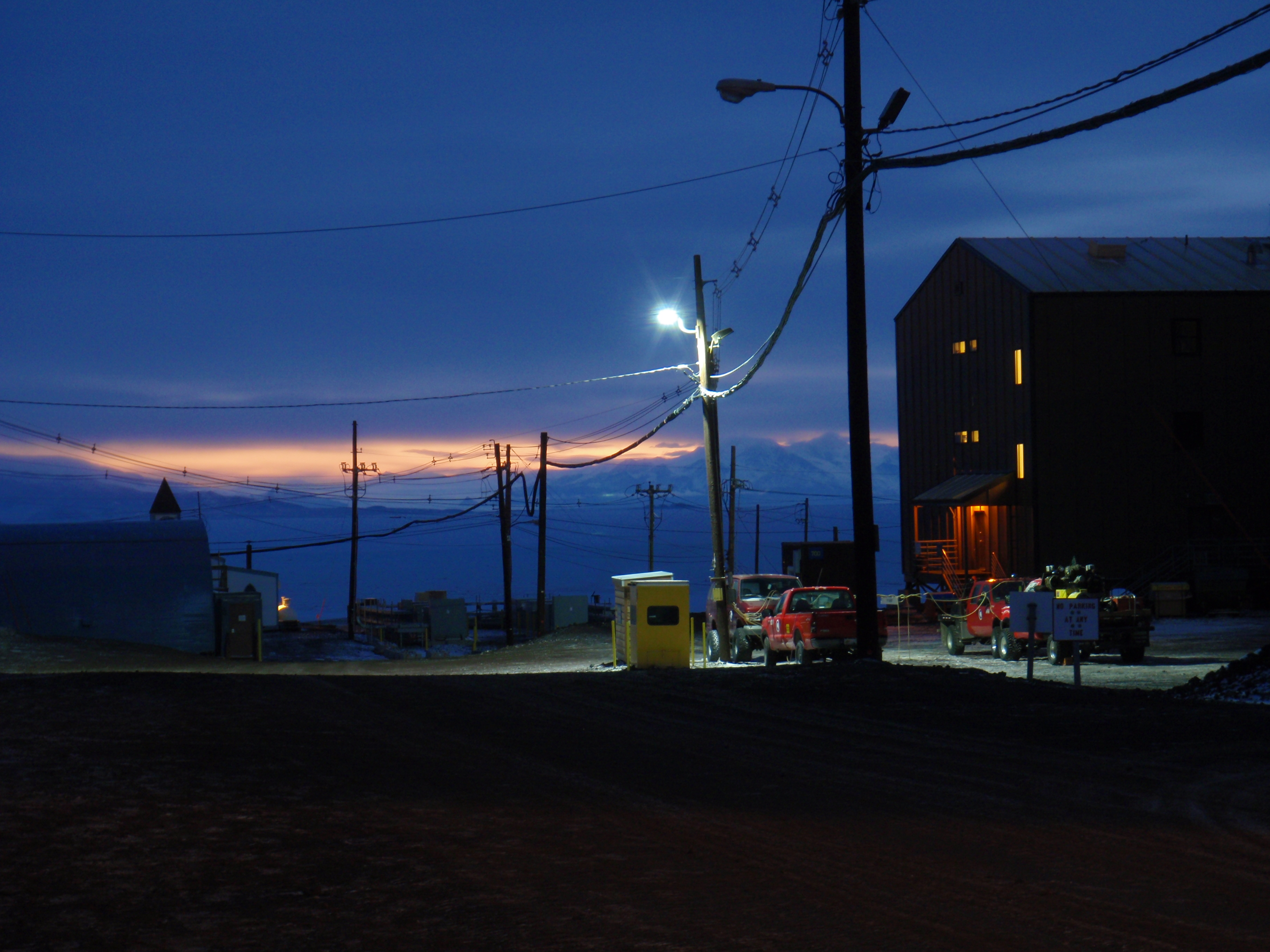
Royal Society Range in the distance

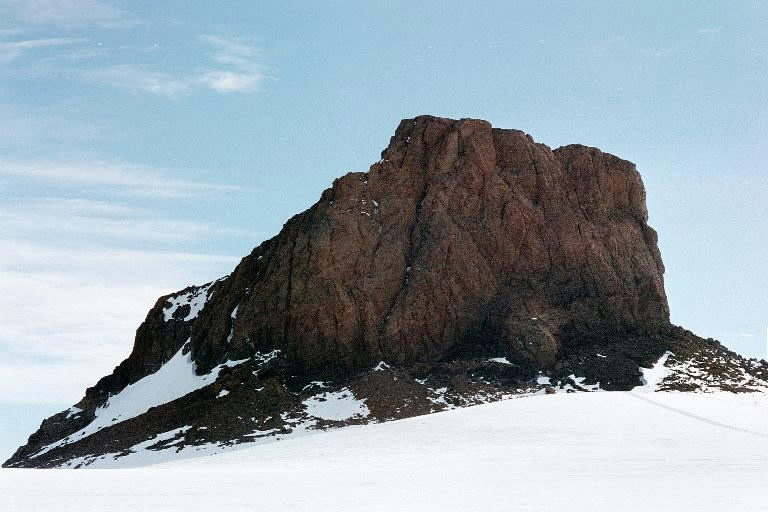
Castle Rock, north of McMurdo

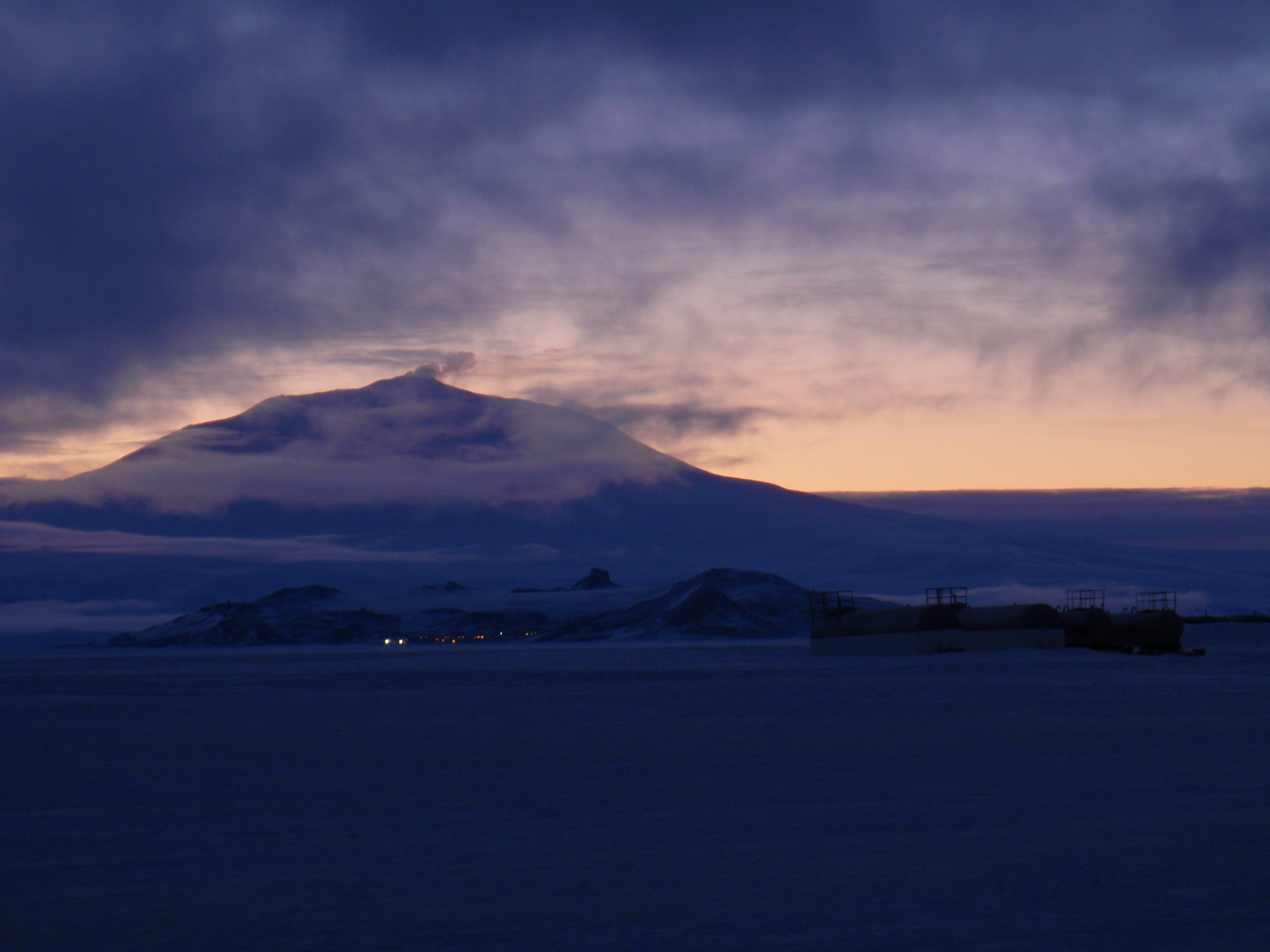
Ross Island's Mount Erebus looms over McMurdo and Scott in the polar twilight

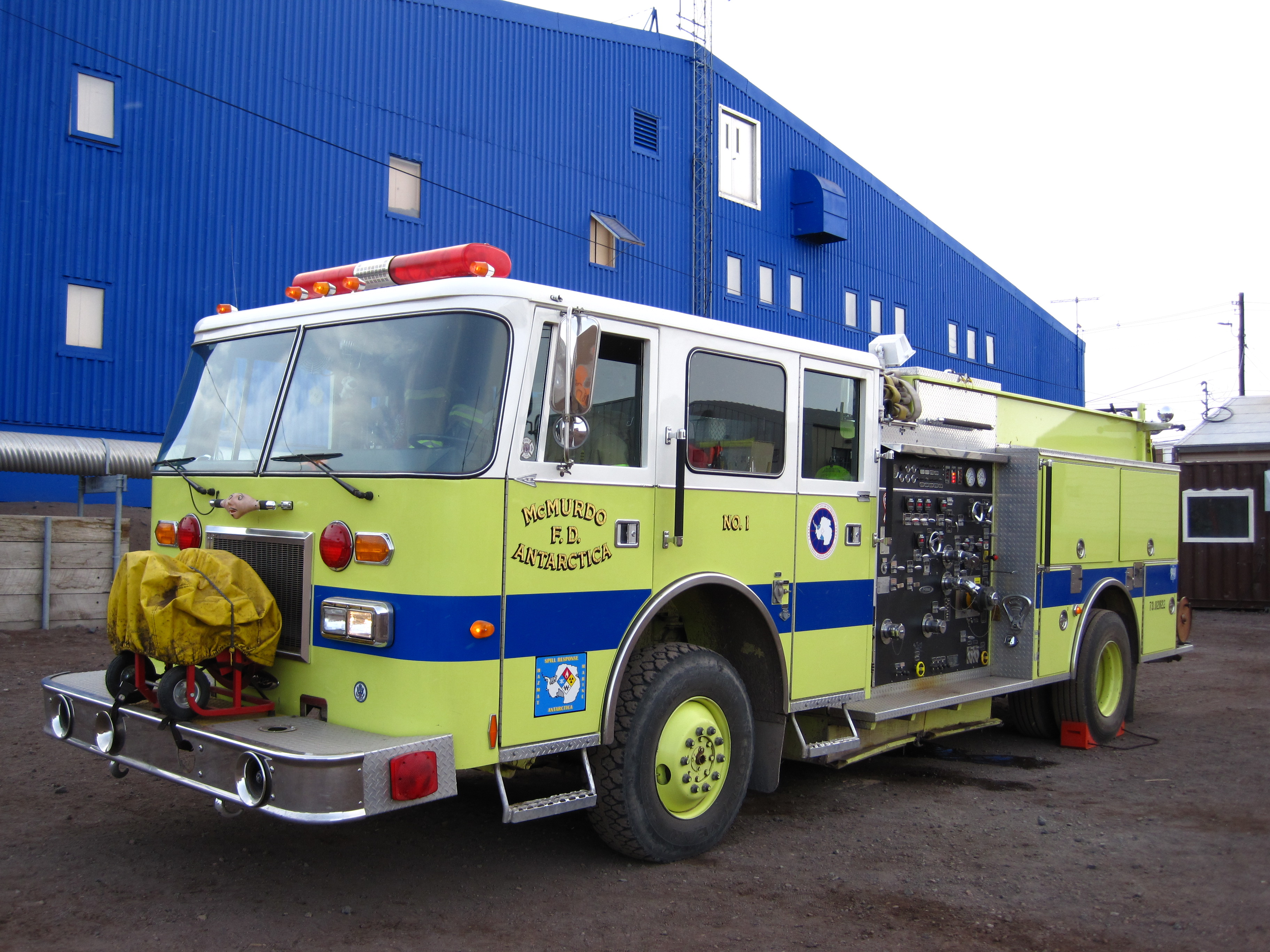
McMurdo Station firetruck

== Nearby bases ==
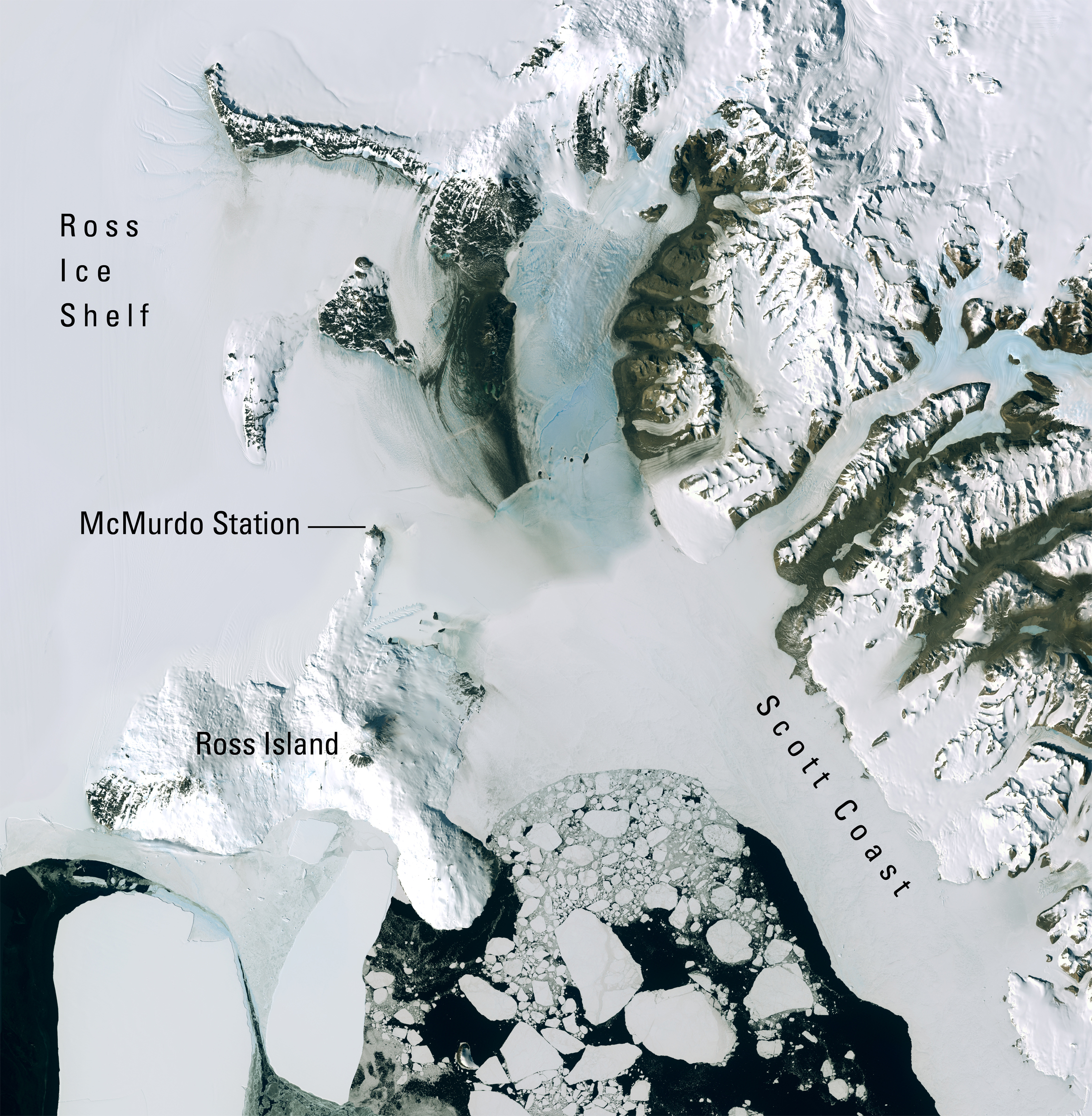
McMurdo's spot on Ross Island (south is up)

By road, McMurdo is 3 kilometres (1.9 mi) from New Zealand's smaller Scott Base, which was built around the same time in the mid-1950s. The development of this area involved a collaboration between the United States and New Zealand; both were projects for the International Geophysical Year (IGY). McMurdo and Scott base are in the New Zealand-claimed Ross Dependency. By article IV of the 1961 Antarctic Treaty System the claim is in abeyance. The two bases were invisaged to be close together on purpose, during Operation Deep Freeze in 1955+, which because of the IGY was part of a multinational project to establish bases in the antarctic, for which the sites were chosen. Christchurch International Airport in New Zealand, 3,920 kilometres (2,440 mi) to the north helps provide logistical support for flying in supplies for the bases. McMurdo has the southernmost harbor in the world, but for access by ships icebreakers can be needed to establish passage.

In addition to McMurdo and Scott, New Zealand and the USA also established Hallet Station, a joint base operated until 1973.

Normally separated by a great distance, McMurdo is a place where the US and New Zealand are neighbors. Scott Base has "American Night", where residents can get 50 cent beers and is known for being crowded.

Other stations near McMurdo, besides Scott Base, include the Italian seasonal base Zucchelli Station, which is on the coast of the Ross Sea (Terra Nova Bay), the German seasonal base Gondwana Station at Gerlache Inlet, also in Terra Nova Bay, and the South Korean Jang Bogo Station of South Korea, also in Terra Nova Bay. In 2024, the PRC opened a new station, Qinling Station, northwest of McMurdo on Terra Nova Bay.

There are many other field stations and huts in the area, including historic or seasonal ones. An example of this is the historic hut at Cape Crozier (the eastern cape of Ross island), which is a stone hut built in 1911 by the British Antarctic Expedition (1910–13) near a penguin rookery.

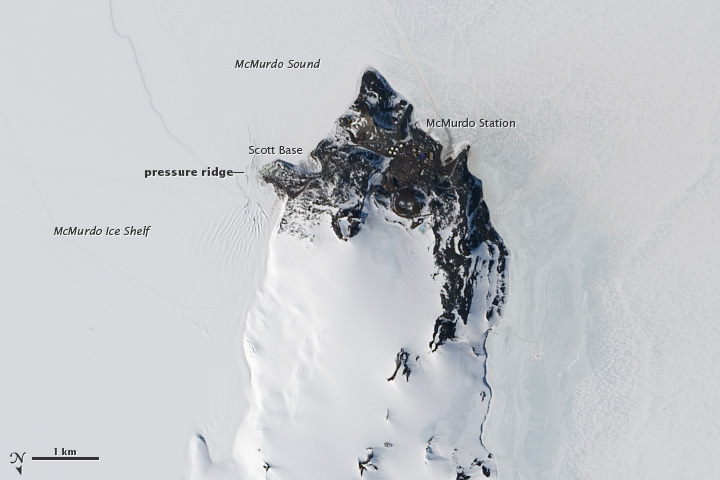
Annotated view over the Hut Peninsula with McMurdo, also showing Scott Base and the McMurdo Ice Shelf (south is up)

== See also ==
- Air New Zealand Flight 901
- ANDRILL
- ANSMET
- List of Antarctic field camps
- Byrd Station
- Castle Rock
- Crime in Antarctica
- Ellsworth Station
- First women to fly to Antarctica
- Hallett Station
- List of Antarctic expeditions
- Little America (exploration base)
- Marble Point
- Palmer Station
- Plateau Station
- List of active permanent Antarctic research stations
- Ross Ice Shelf
- Siple Station
- WAIS Divide

== Sources ==
- Clarke, Peter: On the Ice. Rand McNally & Company, 1966.
- "Facts About the United States Antarctic Research Program". Division of Polar Programs, National Science Foundation; July 1982.
- Gillespie, Noel (November–December 1999). "'Deep Freeze': US Navy Operations in Antarctica 1955–1999, Part One". Air Enthusiast (84): 54–63. ISSN 0143-5450.
- United States Antarctic Research Program Calendar 1983
