= 139th Airlift Squadron =

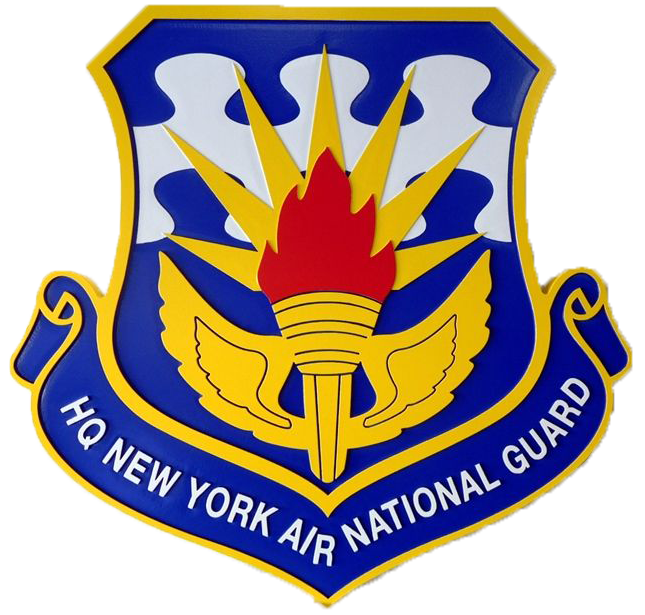
139th Airlift Squadron

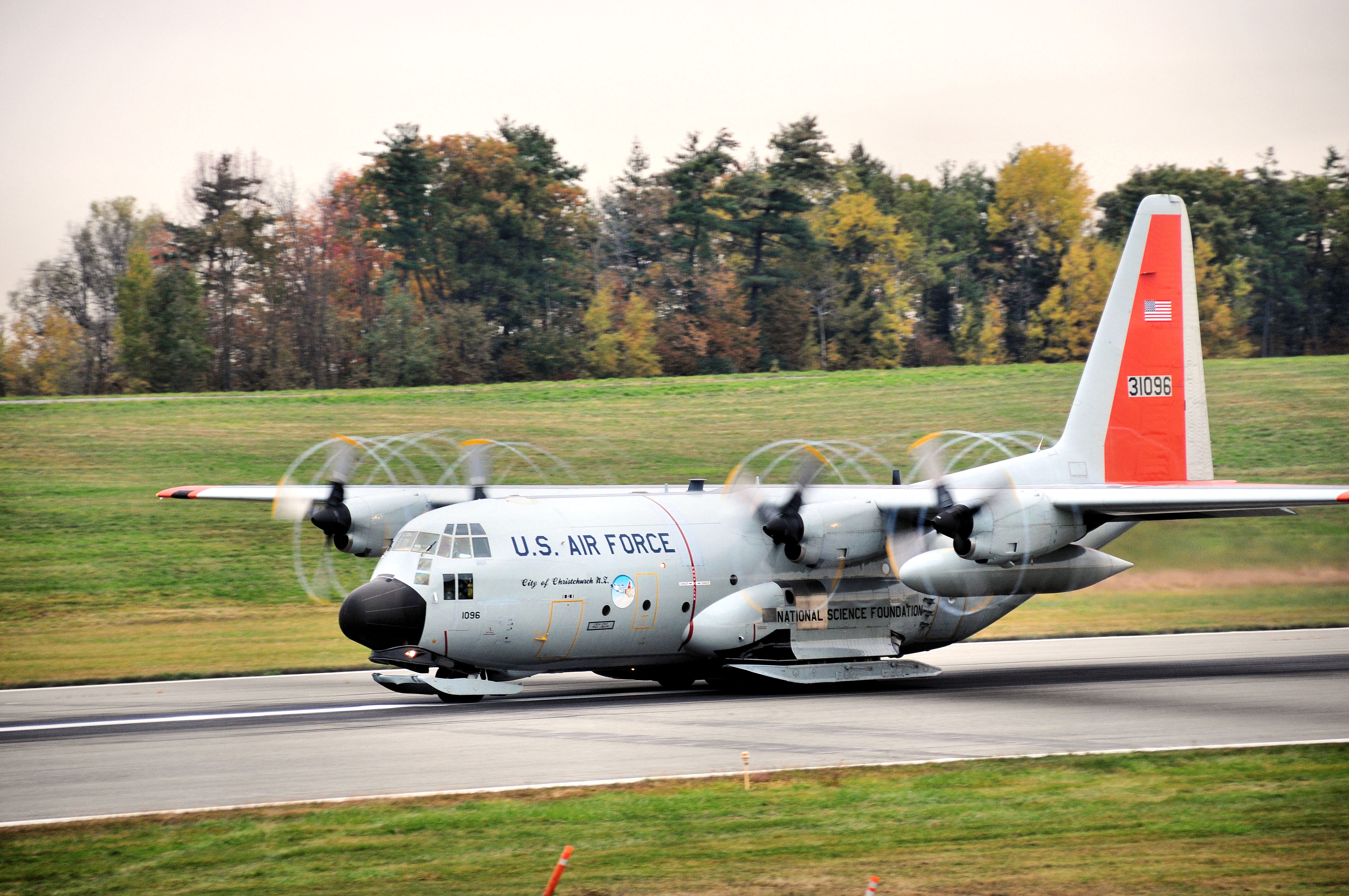
- 139th Airlift Squadron – Lockheed LC-130H Hercules 93-1096
- Active: 1942–1944; 1948–1971; 1971–present
- Country: United States
- Allegiance: New York
- Branch: Air National Guard
- Type: Squadron
- Role: Specialized Airlift
- Part of: New York Air National Guard
- Garrison/HQ: Stratton Air National Guard Base, New York
- Mottos: Always Ready, Ever Willing

Insignia
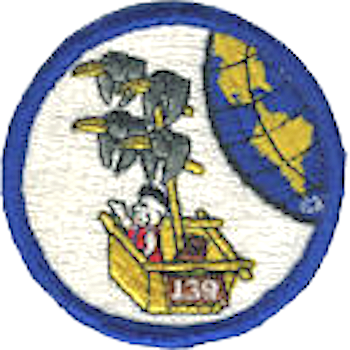
- 139th Military Airlift Squadron Emblem

The 139th Airlift Squadron is a unit of the New York Air National Guard 109th Airlift Wing Stationed at Stratton Air National Guard Base, Schenectady, New York. The 139th is equipped with the specialized ski-equipped LC-130H Hercules for polar operations.

== History ==
=== World War II ===
The 303rd Fighter Squadron was activated at Morris Field, North Carolina, receiving its initial cadre from the 20th Fighter Group, initially operated as an operational training squadron (OTU), flying P-39 Airacobras and P-43 Lancers with a mission to train newly graduated pilots from Training Command in single-engine fighter aircraft. Beginning in mid-1943 switched to replacement training (RTU) of pilots. Equipment upgraded to P-47 Thunderbolts and, lastly, P-40 Warhawks. Was disbanded in May 1944 with reorganization of training units, personnel and equipment absorbed by "Squadron B", 336th AAF Base Unit (Replacement Training Unit, Fighter).

=== New York Air National Guard ===
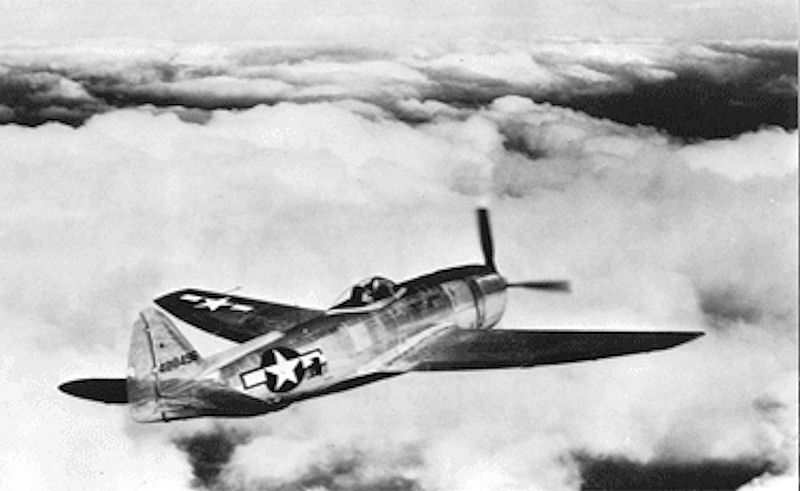
139th Fighter Squadron F-47D Thunderbolt, 1949

The 303d Fighter Squadron was reconstituted and redesignated the 139th Fighter Squadron, and was allotted to the National Guard on 24 May 1946. It was organized at Schenectady County Airport, Schenectady, New York, and was extended federal recognition on 18 October 1948. The 139th Fighter Squadron was equipped with P-47D Thunderbolts and was initially assigned to the New York ANG 52d Fighter Wing, later to the 107th Fighter Group in November 1948.

The mission of the 139th Fighter Squadron was the air defense of eastern and northern New York. Aircraft parts were no problem, and many of the maintenance personnel were World War II veterans, so readiness was quite high and the planes were often much better maintained than their USAF counterparts. In some ways, the postwar Air National Guard was almost like a flying country club and a pilot could often show up at the field, check out an aircraft and go flying. However, the unit also had regular military exercises that kept up proficiency, and in gunnery and bombing contests, they would often score at least as well or better than active-duty USAF units, given the fact that most ANG pilots were World War II combat veterans.

==== Air Defense mission ====
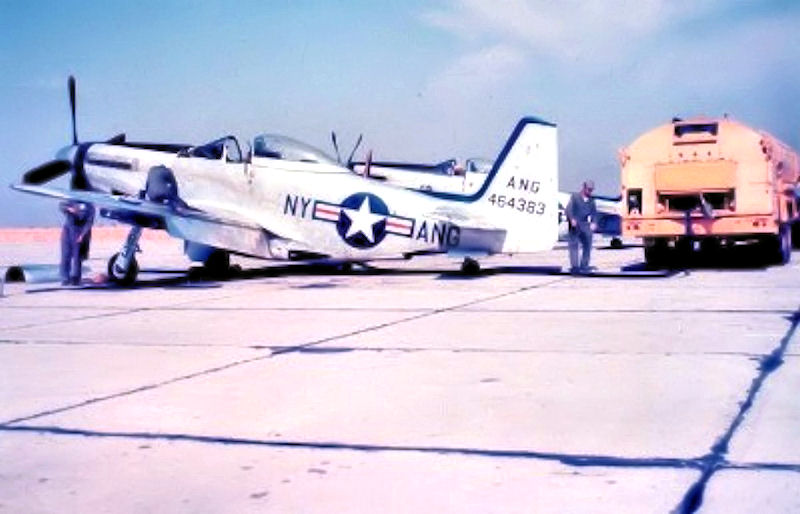
139th Fighter Squadron F-51H Mustang at Schenectady County Airport (Note: Aircraft is North American F-51H-5-NA Mustang, serial 44–64383.)

With the surprise invasion of South Korea on 25 June 1950, and the regular military's lack of readiness, most of the Air National Guard was federalized and placed on active duty. The 139th was retained by the State of New York to maintain the air defense mission. In 1951, the Thunderbolts were replaced by very long range F-51H Mustangs, which were capable of extended air defense flights over all of New York State.

The air defense mission remained after the Korean War armistice and the unit resumed normal peacetime training and drills. In 1954, the Mustang was ending its service life, and Air Defense Command (ADC) was re-equipping its fighter-interceptor squadrons with jet aircraft. The 139th received F-94B Starfires; the F-94 required a two-man aircrew, a pilot and an air observer, to operate its radar equipment. Trainees for the radar assignment had to attend regular Air Force Training Schools, and required virtually the same qualifications as the pilot trainees. The additional recruitment of guardsmen led to the units having a manning and capabilities problem that lasted for some time until the unit was returned to full readiness.

In 1956, the 107th Fighter-Interceptor Wing was reorganized and redesignated as the 107th Air Defense Wing. As a result, the 139th was authorized to expand to a group level, and the 109th Fighter Group (Air Defense) was established. The 139th becoming the group's flying squadron. Other elements assigned to the group were the 109th group headquarters, 109th Material Squadron (maintenance and supply), 109th Air Base Squadron, and the 105th USAF Dispensary. The F-86H Sabre replaced the F-94B Starfires in 1957.

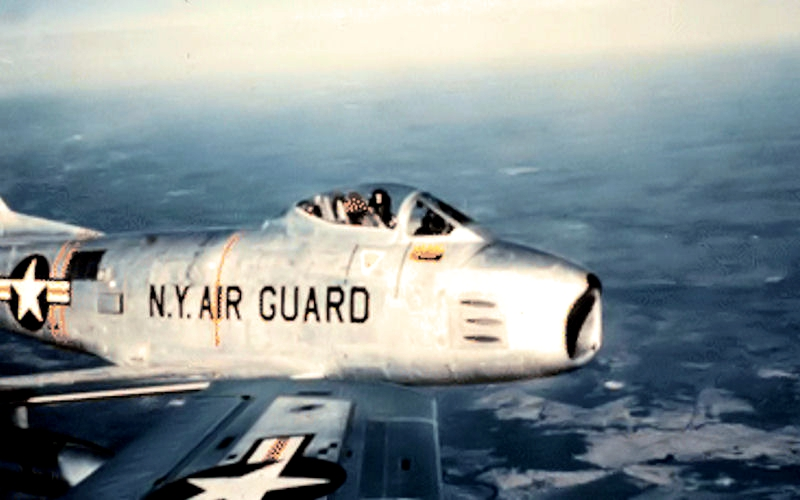
139th Tactical Fighter Squadron F-86H Sabre, 1958

A major change to the 139th in 1958 was the transition from an ADC to Tactical Air Command (TAC) and a tactical fighter mission, the 139th being redesignated as the 139th Tactical Fighter Squadron. The new assignment involved a change in the squadron's training mission to include high-altitude interception, air-to-ground rocketry, ground strafing and tactical bombing. The 139th TFS retained their F-86H Sabres.

==== Airlift mission ====
With air transportation recognized as a critical need, the 109th was redesignated the 109th Air Transport Group, Heavy on 2 January 1960 and was its mobilization gaining command changed from TAC to Military Air Transport Service (MATS). The 139th Air Transport Squadron was equipped with C-97 Stratofreighter intercontinental transports, with an aeromedical flight as a secondary mission. With the C-97s, the 139th augmented the MATS airlift capability worldwide in support of the Air Force's needs in Europe.

During the 1961 Berlin Crisis, the 139th was federalized on 1 October 1961. From Schenectady, the 139th augmented MATS airlift capability worldwide in support of the Air Force's needs. It returned again to New York state control on 31 August 1962.

During the 1960s, the Group flew scheduled MATS transport missions to Europe, Africa, the Caribbean and South America. On 8 January 1966, Military Air Transport Service became Military Airlift Command (MAC) and the 139th was redesignated as the 139th Military Airlift Squadron.

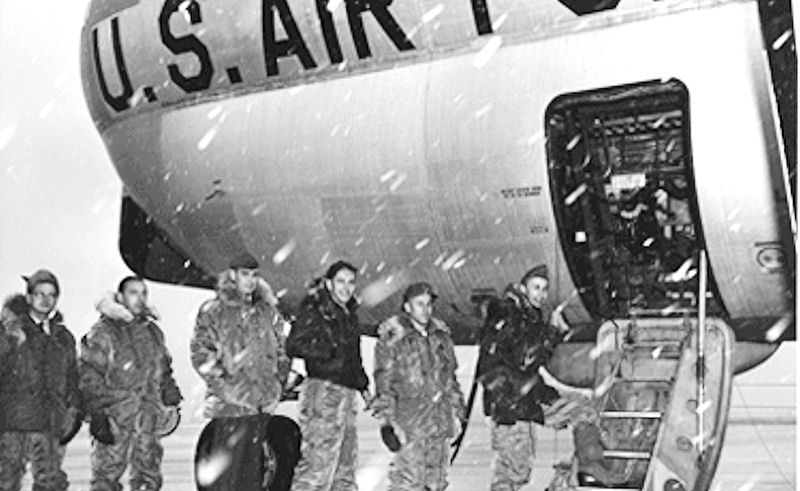
139th MAS C-97 at snowy Schenectady in the 1960s.

With the retirement of the C-97 in 1971, the 109th became a Tactical Airlift Group, and the 139th Tactical Airlift Squadron received eight C-130A Hercules transports and its gainin command changed from MAC to Tactical Air Command.

The first major mission of the C-130s was in June 1972, when the squadron provided relief assistance to storm victims of Hurricane Agnes. 109th crews gave around-the-clock support to relief efforts. Operating mainly from the Broome County Airport at Binghamton, 109th crews provided the lion's share of airlift into stricken areas, particularly Elmira, where surface transportation was cut off. On 1 December 1974, the unit was transferred back to Military Airlift Command when MAC took over the tactical airlift mission from TAC, USAFE and PACAF air force wide.

==== DEW Line/Antarctic Research Mission Support ====
In 1975 the 107th was given a new mission for resupply of the Greenland Icecap's radar stations. The 109th was re-equipped with 5 C-130D Hercules, assuming responsibility for the Volant DEW Line resupply mission to the DYE-1, 2, 3 and DYE-4 stations. The 109th assumed the mission from the Air Force's Alaskan Air Command receiving their eleven C-130s, five of which were ski-equipped for landings on packed snow runways. In October 1984, the C-130D aircraft were replaced by eight new C-130H models, of which four were LC-130s (ski equipped).

In 1988 the 109th had been notified that, almost overnight, one of the Distant Early Warning (DEW) Line radar sites that it supported in Greenland was going to be shut down. The other sites would soon follow and the 109th would be largely out of business because its main mission had ended. The last flight to radar site DYE-3 in December 1989 marked the end of the DEW Line mission. The 107th assumed jurisdiction of the landing strip at the DYE-2 station for pilot training for practicing Antarctic takeoffs & landings (called Ice Station Ruby); a.k.a. the Raven Ski-way Training Facility.

After the closure of the Greenland stations, the experienced gained by the unit was transferred to its new mission; the airlift support to National Science Foundation's South Pole research program and the U.S. Navy's VXE-6 unit. The 109th continued to augment the Navy's Antarctic flying operations for the next eight years.

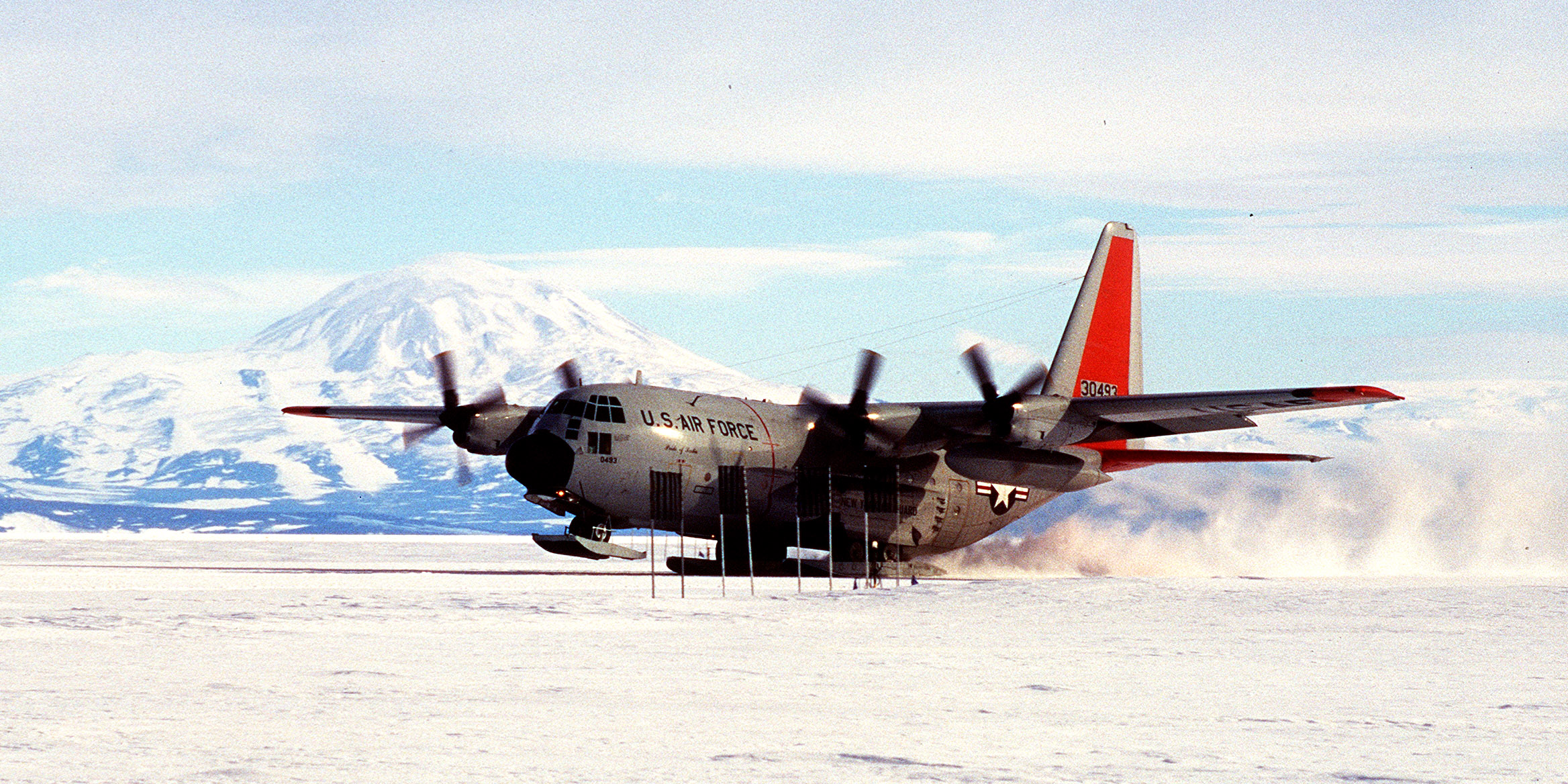
109th AW LC-130H landing at McMurdo Station, Antarctica

The 109th was not mobilized during the 1990 Gulf Crisis, however 109th AW members were called to duty in support of Operation Desert Shield/Operation Desert Storm. In March 1992, with the end of the Cold War, the 109th adopted the Air Force Objective Organization plan, and the unit was redesignated as the 109th Airlift Group. On 1 October 1995, in accordance with the Air Force "One Base – One Wing" policy, the 109th Airlift Wing was established and the 139th Airlift Squadron was assigned to the new 109th Operations Group. In September 1994 139th Aeromeds deployed to Rwanda in support of Operation Support Hope.

In mid-1996, the Air Force, in response to budget cuts, and changing world situations, began experimenting with Air Expeditionary organizations. The Air Expeditionary Force concept was developed that would mix Active-Duty, Reserve and Air National Guard elements into a combined force. Instead of entire permanent units deploying as "Provisional" as in the 1991 Gulf War, Expeditionary units are composed of "aviation packages" from several wings, including active-duty Air Force, the Air Force Reserve Command and the Air National Guard, would be married together to carry out the assigned deployment rotation.

Early in 1996, it was announced that the 109th Airlift Wing was slated to assume that entire Antarctic mission from the U.S. Navy in 1999. The Antarctic operation would be fully funded by the NSF. On 20 February 1998, responsibility for airlift support to the United States Antarctic Program (USAP) was passed over to 109 AW from VXE-6, during a ceremony at Christchurch International Airport, Christchurch, New Zealand.

With the assumption of the support mission from the Navy, the 109th established an operating location at Christchurch and a forward location at Williams Field, on the Ross Ice Shelf, Antarctica. Williams Field consists of two hard-packed snow runways located on approximately 8 meters (26 feet) of compacted snow, lying on top of 80 meters (260 feet) of ice, floating over 550 meters (1,800 feet) of water. Williams provides support to the United States McMurdo Station and New Zealand's Scott Base.

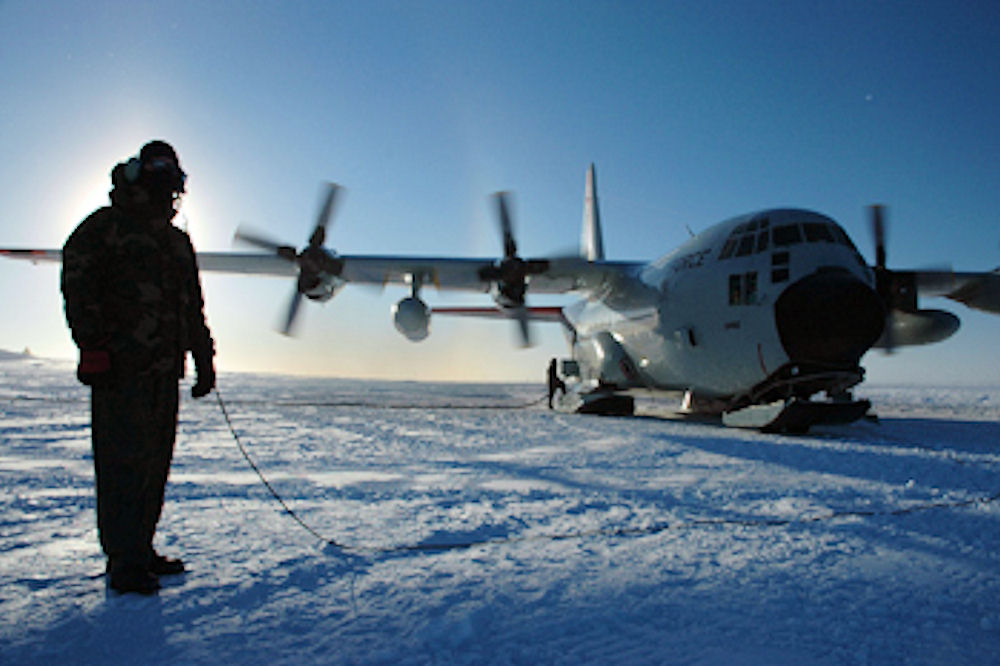
139th Airlift Squadron – Lockheed LC-130H Hercules in Antarctica.

During October 1999 the squadron aided in the rescue of Dr. Jerri Nielsen, a doctor with breast cancer symptoms and based at isolated Amundsen–Scott South Pole Station in Antarctica.

==== Modern era ====
The squadron's operational tempo increased with the surprise attack on the World Trade Center on 11 September 2001. The 109th provided immediate support deploying 49 Civil Engineers, Services and Public Affairs personnel to Ground Zero within the first 24 hours. Since that time, the men and women of the 109th AW have continued to voluntarily deploy in support of military operations in Southwest Asia and around the world.

In its 2005 BRAC recommendations, DoD recommended to realign the 109th Airlift Wing by transferring four C-130H aircraft to the 189th Airlift Wing at Little Rock Air Force Base, Arkansas. The LC-130 aircraft (ski-equipped) would remain at Schenectady.

The 139th Expeditionary Airlift Squadron deployed to Afghanistan in June 2007, marking the first time since Vietnam that aircraft from the unit flew their own aircraft in a combat theater of operations.

During the 2011–2012 season, crews flying six LC-130H Ski-Herk transports carried out 359 missions between McMurdo Station, Antarctica, and eighteen inland Antarctic destinations, transporting more than seven million pounds of cargo and fuel and more than 1,600 passengers. The LC-130H crews were also called on to provide aerial reconnaissance and communication links to a disabled Russian vessel, allowing for a Royal New Zealand Air Force C-130 crew to later airdrop three parcels on an ice floe next to the ailing ship

The wing has deployed an average of 150 on duty at any one time. The Airmen deploy for 30–60 days each, working two 12-hour shifts each week, running supplies and people to field camps across the continent and the South Pole station.

When the squadron is the primary force provider, the 139th Expeditionary Airlift Squadron is the designation of the forces deployed as part of an Air and Space Expeditionary unit after June 1996.

== Lineage ==
139th Military Airlift Squadron

- Constituted as the 303d Fighter Squadron (Single Engine) on 16 July 1942

Activated on 23 July 1942
Disbanded on 1 May 1944
Reconstituted and redesignated 139th Fighter Squadron, Single Engine and allotted to the National Guard on 24 May 1946
Activated and received federal recognition on 18 October 1948
Redesignated 139th Fighter-Interceptor Squadron on 1 October 1952
Redesignated 139th Tactical Fighter Squadron on 10 November 1958
Redesignated 139th Air Transport Squadron, Heavy on 2 January 1960 (Note: The unit was to be redesignated the 139th Combat Airlift Squadron on 1 July 1962, but the Department of the Air Force AFOMO Letter directing the action was rescinded in late June.)
Federalized and placed on active duty on 1 March 1961
Released from active duty and returned to New York state control on 1 December 1962
Redesignated 139th Military Airlift Squadron on 1 January 1966
Inactivated on 15 March 1971
Consolidated with the 139th Tactical Airlift Squadron on 18 August 1987

139th Airlift Squadron

- Constituted as the 139th Tactical Airlift Squadron

Activated on 16 March 1971
Consolidated with the 139th Military Airlift Squadron on 18 August 1987
Redesignated 139th Airlift Squadron on 15 March 1992

=== Assignments ===
- 337th Fighter Group, 23 July 1942 – 1 May 1944
- 107th Fighter Group (later 107th Fighter-Interceptor Group), 18 October 1948
- 109th Fighter Group (later 109th Tactical Fighter Group, 109th Air Transport Group), 15 April 1956
- 133d Air Transport Wing, 1 October 1961
- 109th Air Transport Group (later 109th Military Airlift Group, 109th Tactical Airlift Group, 109th Airlift Group), 1 December 1962
- 109th Operations Group, 1 October 1995 – present

=== Stations ===
- Morris Field, North Carolina, 23 July 1942
- Spartanburg Municipal Airport, South Carolina, 23 July 1942
- Sarasota Army Air Field, Florida, 20 August 1942
- Drew Field, Florida, 22 August 1942
- Sarasota Army Air Field, Florida, 5 Jan 1943 – 1 May 1944
- Schenectady County Airport (later Stratton Air National Guard Base), Schenectady, New York, 18 November 1948

Operates from Christchurch International Airport, Christchurch, New Zealand, 20 February 1998–Present
Operates from Williams Field, Antarctica, 1998–Present

=== Aircraft ===
- P-39 Airacobra, 1942
- P-43 Lancer, 1942
- P-47 (later F-47) Thunderbolt, 1943, 1948–1952
- P-40 Warhawk, 1943–1944
- F-51H Mustang, 1952–1954
- F-94B Starfire, 1954–1957
- F-86H Sabre, 1957–1960
- C-97 Stratofreighter, 1960–1971
- C-130A Hercules, 1971–1975
- C-130D Hercules, 1975–1984
- C-130H Hercules, 1984–present
- LC-130H Hercules, 1984–Present
