= Pegasus Road =

Road in Antarctica

Coordinates: 77°53′S 166°57′E

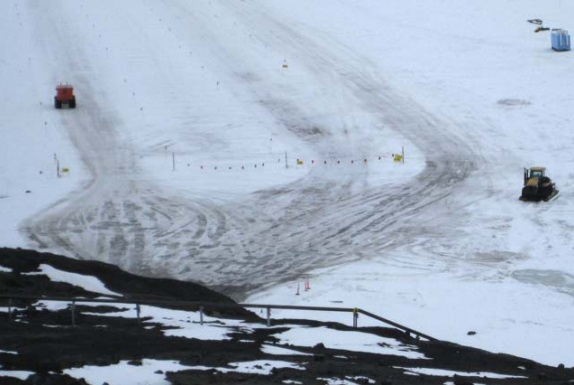
Pegasus Road transition from Ross Island to Ross Ice Shelf, near Scott Base

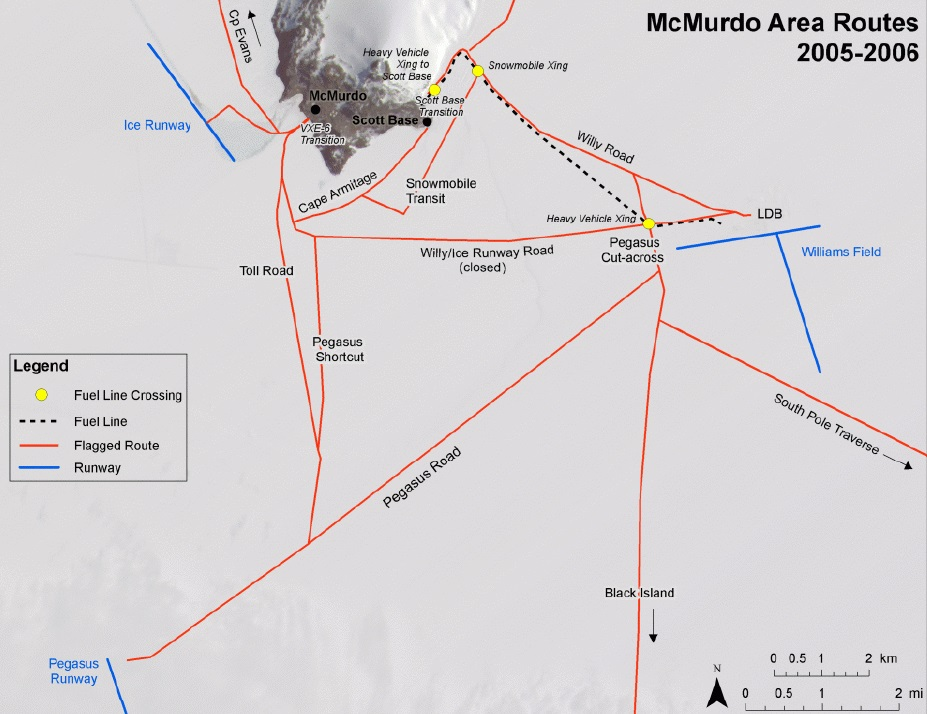
McMurdo Area Routes 2005-2006, showing Pegasus Field (lower left), Ross Island (top center), and the connecting road

Pegasus Road is an 18-mile (29 km) long road of dirt and packed snow constructed by the United States Antarctic Program on Ross Island and the Ross Ice Shelf in Antarctica. The trip along the road from McMurdo Station to Pegasus Field takes approximately 45 minutes in a "Delta" wheeled vehicle, although on occasion high temperatures have damaged the runway and caused the road surface to deteriorate enough to lengthen the trip to two hours.

New Zealand's Scott Base is also served by the road.
