= 109th Airlift Wing =

Unit of US state aerial militia

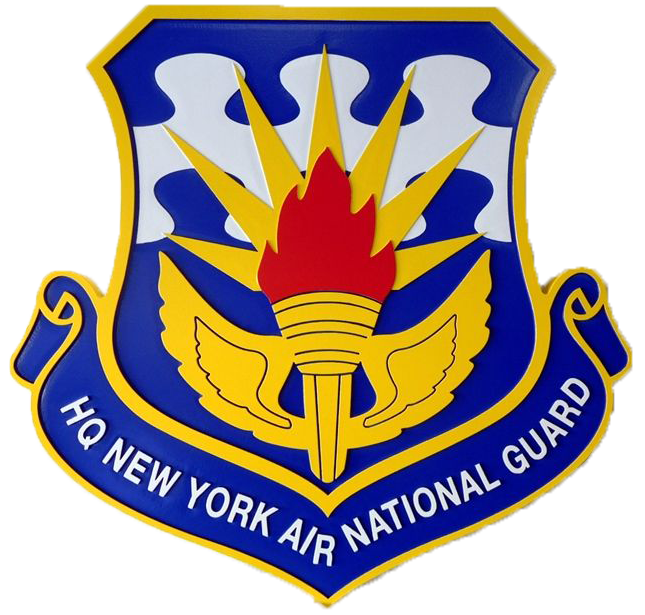
109th Airlift Wing

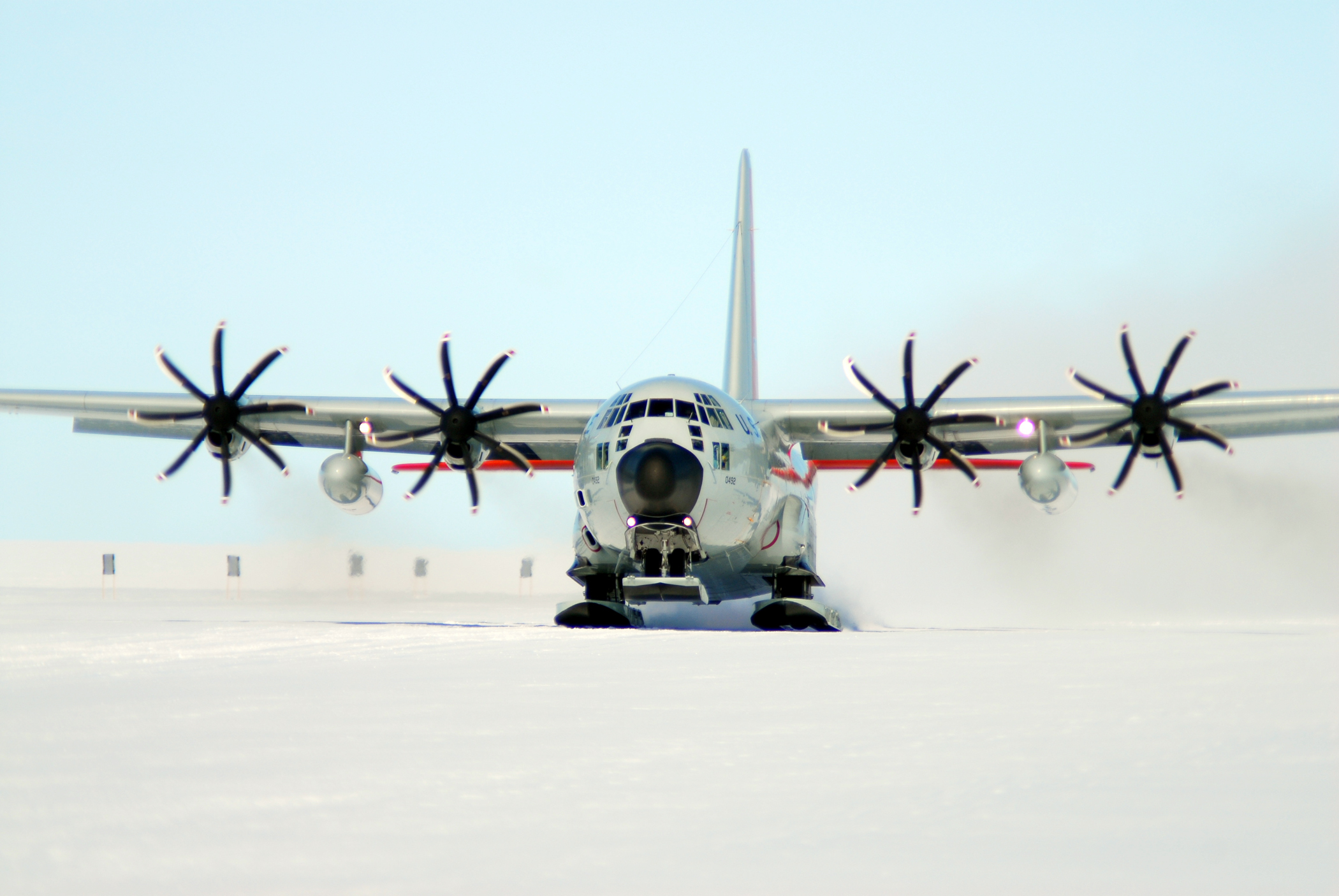
- An LC-130 Hercules from the 109th Airlift Wing, New York Air National Guard takes off as part of Operation Deep Freeze, in Antarctica.
- Active: 1956-1971; 1971–present
- Country: United States
- Allegiance: New York
- Branch: Air National Guard
- Type: Wing
- Role: Airlift
- Part of: New York Air National Guard
- Garrison/HQ: Stratton Air National Guard Base, Schenectady, New York

Insignia
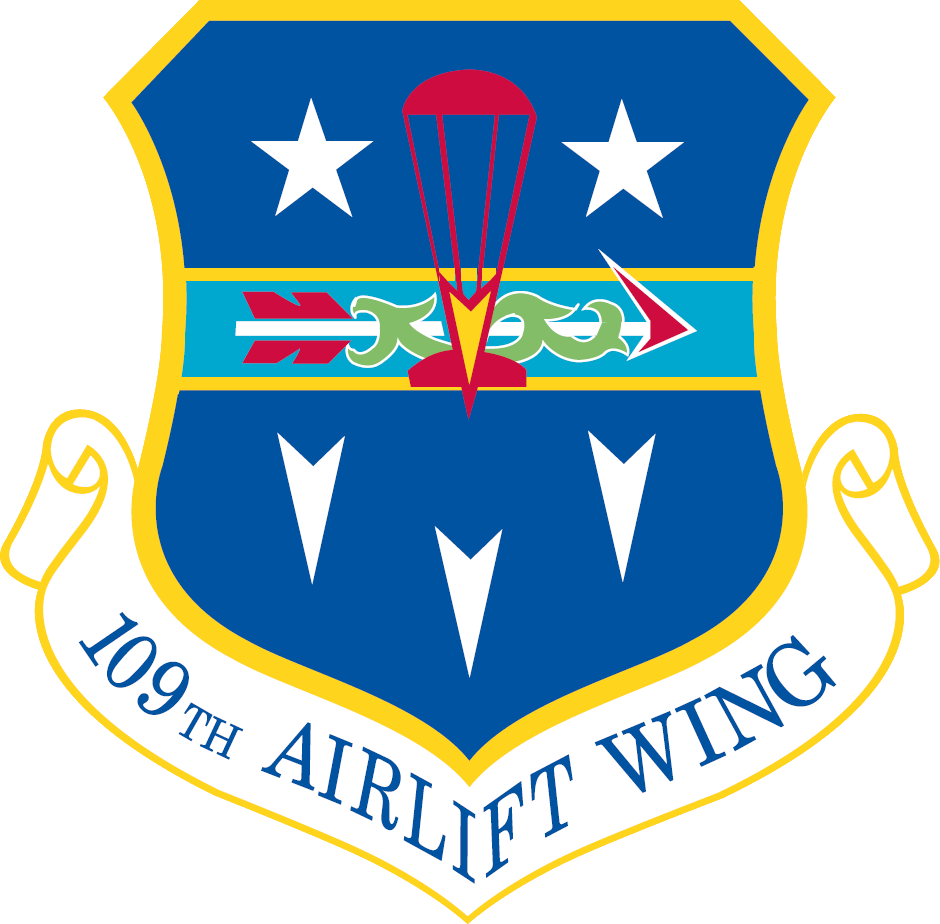
- 109th Airlift Wing emblem

The 109th Airlift Wing is a unit of the New York Air National Guard, stationed at Stratton Air National Guard Base, Schenectady, New York. If activated to federal service, the Wing is gained by the United States Air Force Air Mobility Command.

== Mission ==
The wing's mission is to provide airlift support to the National Science Foundation's South Pole research program by flying LC-130H Hercules airlifters, modified with wheel-ski gear, in support of Arctic and Antarctic operations. The 109th Airlift Wing is the only unit in the world to fly these aircraft. These resupply missions are part of Operation Deep Freeze, the U.S. military's ongoing support of the National Science Foundation's Antarctic research. Larger aircraft like C-17 can land at McMurdo Station on the Antarctic coast and the LC-130 can fly to remote research stations like the Amundsen-Scott South Pole Station. 109th Airlift Wing operates 5 LC-130.

Along with the NSF mission, the 109th Airlift Wing also supported Operation Enduring Freedom. In addition to its combat airlift mission, particularly when placed in a Federalized status, the wing also provides domestic-related functions commonly associated with Air National Guard units, such as disaster or hurricane relief.

== Units ==
The 109th Airlift Wing consists of the following major units:

- 109th Operations Group

139th Airlift Squadron
139th Aeromedical Evacuation Squadron

- 109th Maintenance Group
- 109th Mission Support Group
- 109th Medical Group

== History ==
Established by the USAF and allotted to New York ANG in 1956. Received federal recognition by the National Guard Bureau and activated on 1 May 1956 as the 109th Fighter Group (Air Defense). The group was assigned to the NY ANG 107th Air Defense Wing and stationed at Schenectady County Airport, Schenectady, New York.

=== Cold War ===
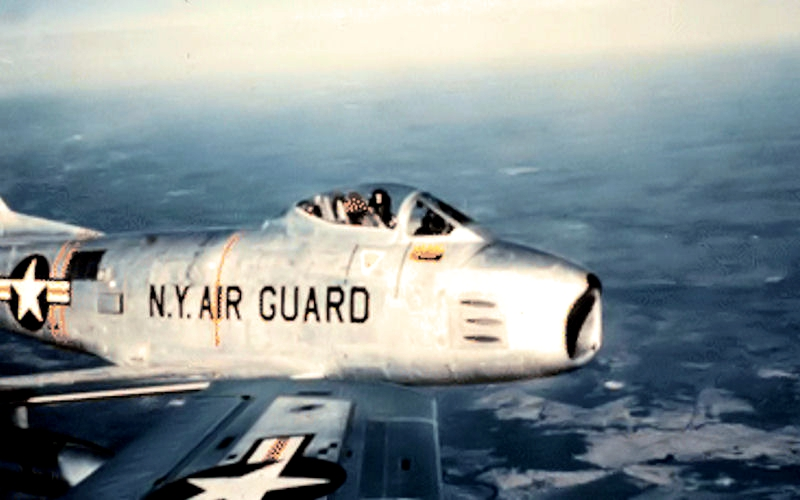
139th Tactical Fighter Squadron F-86H Sabre, 1958

The primary mission was the air defense of eastern and northern New York. It was assigned the 139th Fighter-Interceptor Squadron as operational unit, equipped with F-94B Starfires.

A major change to the 107th Air Defense Wing in 1958 was the transition from an Air Defense Command (ADC) mission to Tactical Air Command (TAC) and a tactical fighter mission, the 109th being re-designated as a Tactical Fighter Group and the 139th also being re-designated. The new assignment involved a change in the group's training mission to include high-altitude interception, air-to-ground rocketry, ground strafing and tactical bombing. The 139th TFS retained their F-86H Sabres.

=== Airlift mission ===
With air transportation recognized as a critical need, the 109th was re-designated the 109th Air Transport Group (Heavy) on 2 January 1960 and was transferred from TAC to the Military Air Transport Service (MATS). The 139th Air Transport Squadron was equipped with C-97 Stratofreighter intercontinental transports, with an Aeromedical Flight as a secondary mission. With the C-97s, the 109d augmented MATS airlift capability worldwide in support of the Air Force's needs in Europe.

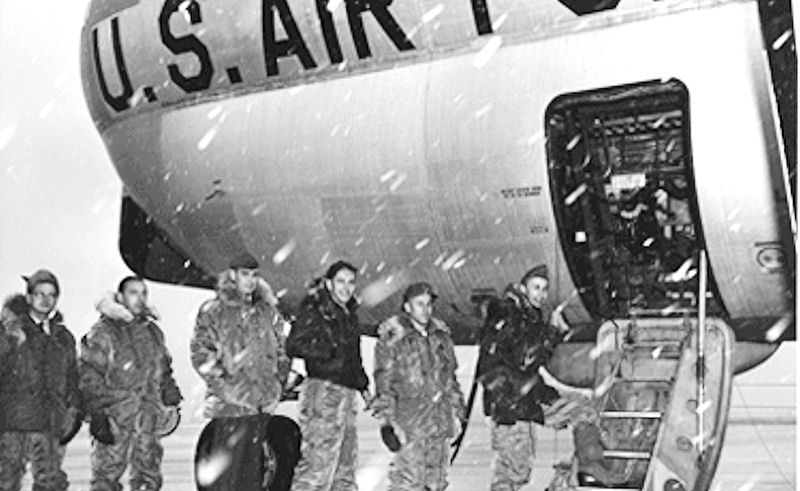
139th MAS C-97 at snowy Schenectady in the 1960s.

During the 1961 Berlin Crisis, the 139th ATS was federalized on 1 October 1961. From Schenectady, the 139th ATS augmented MATS airlift capability worldwide in support of the Air Force's needs. It returned again to New York State control on 31 August 1962.

During the 1960s, the Group flew scheduled MATS transport missions to Europe, Africa the Caribbean and South America. On 8 January 1966, Military Air Transport Service became Military Airlift Command (MAC) and the units were re-designated as the 109th Military Airlift Group and 139th was re-designated as the 137th Military Airlift Squadron.

With the retirement of the C-97 in 1971, the 109th became a Tactical Airlift Group and the 139th Tactical Airlift Squadron received eight C-130A Hercules transports and was transferred from MAC to Tactical Air Command.

The first major mission of the C-130s was in June 1972 when the squadron provided relief assistance to storm victims of Tropical Storm Agnes. 109th crews gave around-the-clock support to relief efforts. Operating mainly from the Broome County Airport at Binghamton, 109th crews provided the lion's share of airlift into stricken areas, particularly Elmira, where surface transportation was cut off. On 1 December 1974, the unit was transferred back to Military Airlift Command when MAC took over the tactical airlift mission from TAC, USAFE and PACAF air force wide.

=== DEW Line/Antarctic Research Mission Support ===
The Navy's Antarctic Development Squadron Six had been flying scientific and military missions to Greenland and the arctic Operation Deep Freeze compound's Williams Field since 1975. The 109th operated ski-equipped LC-130s had been flying National Science Foundation support missions to Antarctica since 1988. In early 1996, the United States National Guard announced that the 109th Airlift Wing at Schenectady County Airport in Scotia, New York was slated to assume that entire mission from the United States Navy in 1999. The Antarctic operation would be fully funded by the National Science Foundation. The wing expected to add approximately 235 full-time personnel to support that operation (which became Operation Deep Freeze). The 109th assumed responsibility for the Volant Distant Early Warning Line (DEW Line) resupply missions as well to the DYE-1, 2, 3 and DYE-4 stations. The 109th assumed the mission from the Air Force's Alaskan Air Command receiving their eleven C-130s, five of which were ski-equipped for landings on packed snow runways. In October 1984, the C-130D aircraft were replaced by eight new C-130H models, of which four were ski equipped LC-130s.

In 1988 the 109th had been notified that, almost overnight, one of the DEW Line radar sites that it supported in Greenland was going to be shut down. The other sites would soon follow and the 109th would be largely out of business because it main mission had ended. The last flight to radar site DYE-3 in December 1989 marked the end of the DEW Line mission. The 107th assumed jurisdiction of the landing strip at the DYE-2 station for pilot training for practicing Antarctic takeoffs & landings (called Ice Station Ruby); a.k.a. the Raven Ski-way Training Facility.

After the closure of the Greenland stations, the experience gained by the wing was transferred to its new mission: airlift support to the National Science Foundation's South Pole research program and the U.S. Navy's Antarctic Development Squadron Six (VXE-6). The 109th continued to augment VXE-6's Antarctic flying operations for the next eight years.

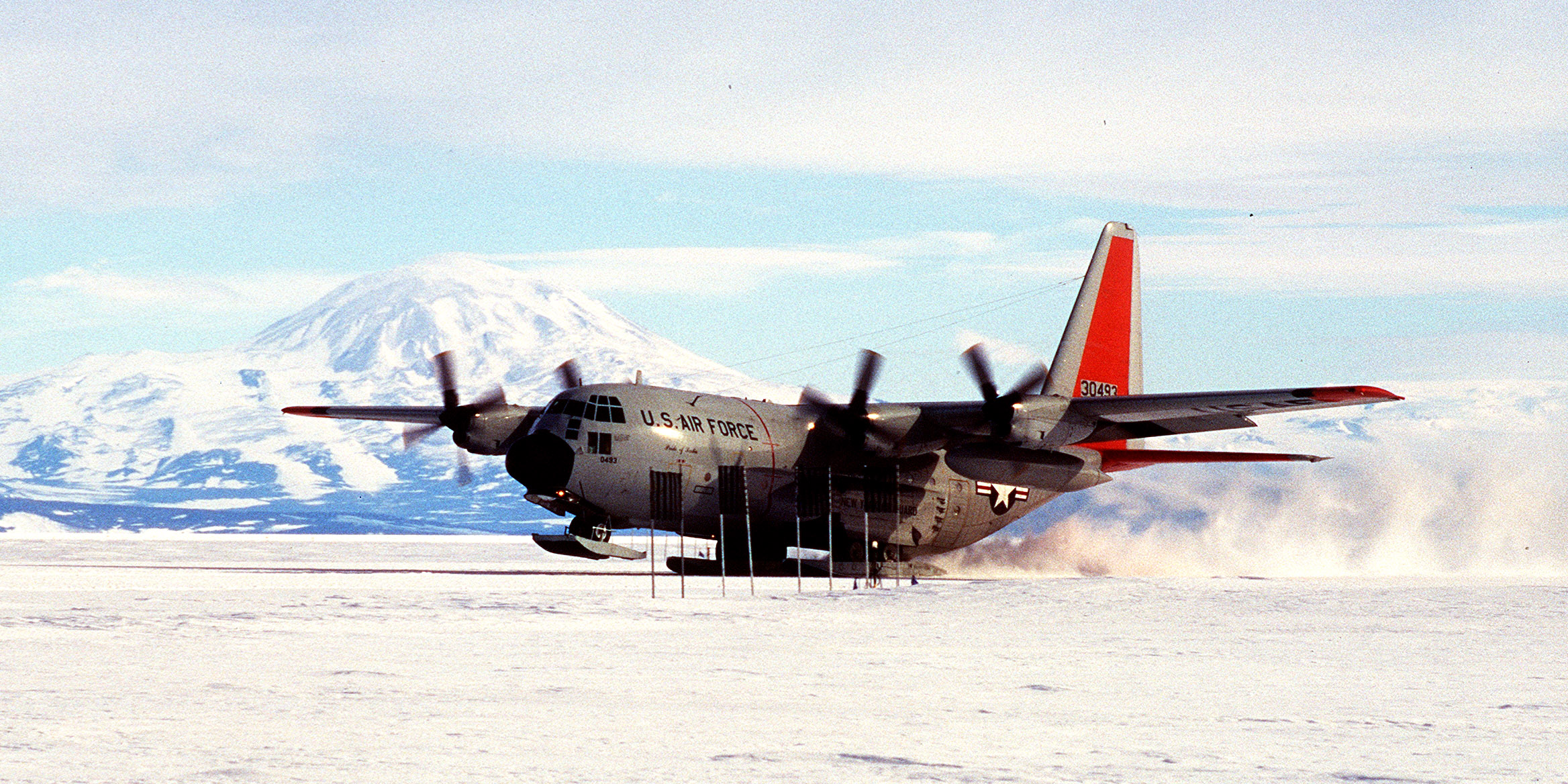
109th AW LC-130H landing at McMurdo Station, Antarctica

The 109th was not mobilized during the 1990 Gulf Crisis, however 109 AW members were called to duty in support of Operation Desert Shield/Operation Desert Storm. In March 1992, with the end of the Cold War, the 109th adopted the Air Force Objective Organization plan, and the unit was re-designated as the 109th Airlift Group. On 1 October 1995, in accordance with the Air Force "One Base - One Wing" policy, the 109th Airlift Wing was established and the 139th Airlift Squadron was assigned to the new 109th Operations Group. In September 1994, elements of the 139th Aeromedical Evacuation Squadron deployed to Rwanda as part of Operation Support Hope.

In mid-1996, the Air Force, in response to budget cuts, and changing world situations, began experimenting with Air Expeditionary organizations. The Air Expeditionary Force (AEF) concept was developed that would mix Active Duty, Air Force Reserve and Air National Guard elements into a combined force. Instead of entire permanent units deploying as "Provisional" as in the 1991 Gulf War, Expeditionary units are composed of "aviation packages" from several wings, including active duty Air Force, the Air Force Reserve Command and the Air National Guard, would be married together to carry out the assigned deployment rotation.

Early in 1996, it was announced that the 109th Airlift Wing was slated to assume that entire Antarctic mission from the U.S. Navy in 1999 as a result of post-Cold War Navy downsizing that would eliminate Antarctic Development Squadron Six (VXE-6), along with their Navy LC-130 Hercules and UH-1 Huey aircraft. The Antarctic operation would then be fully funded by the National Science Foundation. On 20 February 1998, responsibility for airlift support to the United States Antarctic Program (USAP) was passed over to the 109 AW from VXE-6 during a ceremony at Christchurch International Airport, Christchurch, New Zealand.

With the assumption of the support mission from the Navy, the 109th established an operating location at Christchurch and a forward location at Williams Field, on the Ross Ice Shelf, Antarctica. Williams Field consists of two hard-packed snow runways located on approximately 8 meters (26 feet) of compacted snow, lying on top of 80 meters (260 feet) of ice, floating over 550 meters (1,800 feet) of water. Williams provides support to the United States McMurdo Station and New Zealand's Scott Base.

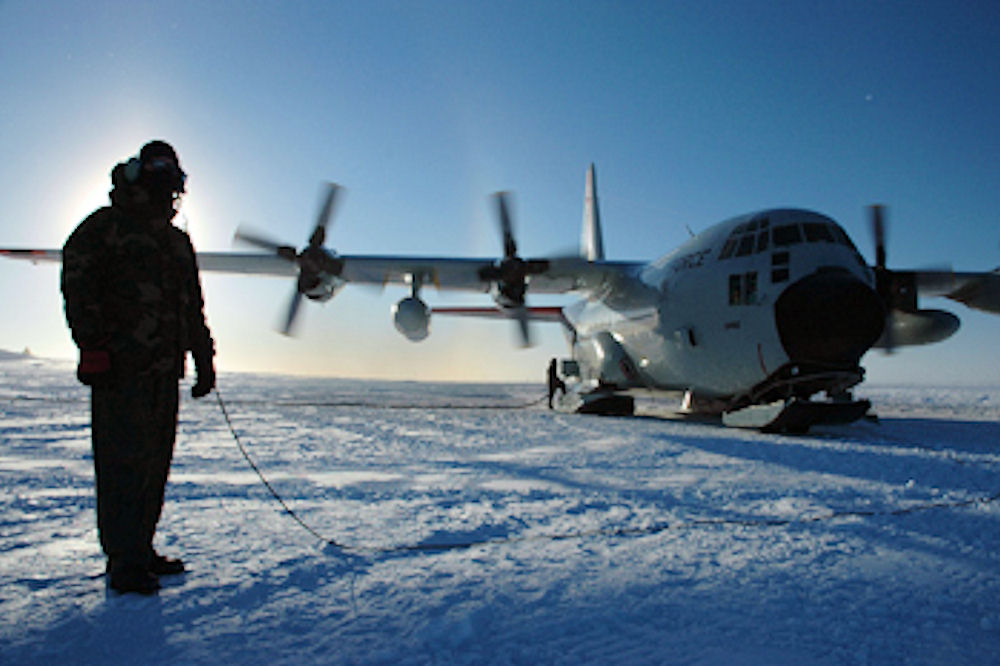
139th Airlift Squadron - Lockheed LC-130H Hercules in Antarctica.

During October 1999 the 109th AW aided in the rescue of Dr. Jerri Nielsen, a doctor with breast cancer symptoms and based at isolated Amundsen–Scott South Pole Station in Antarctica.

=== Twenty-first century ===
The 109th Wing's high operational tempo increased dramatically with the surprise attack on the World Trade Center on September 11, 2001. The 109th provided immediate support deploying 49 Civil Engineers, Services and Public Affairs personnel to Ground Zero within the first 24 hours. Since that time, the men and women of the 109th AW have continued to voluntarily deploy in support of military operations in Southwest Asia and around the world.

In its 2005 BRAC Recommendations, DoD recommended to realign the 109th Airlift Wing by transferring four C-130H aircraft to the 189th Airlift Wing, Little Rock AFB, Arkansas. The LC-130 aircraft (ski-equipped) would remain at Schenectady. This decision was not enacted. An effective lobby against the move was carried out by the Schenectady Military Affairs Council.

From 2006 to 2010, the wing was commanded by Anthony P. German, who later served as Adjutant General of New York. The 139th Expeditionary Airlift Squadron deployed to Afghanistan in June 2007, marking the first time since Vietnam that aircraft from the unit flew their own aircraft in a combat theater of operations.

During the 2011–2012 season, crews flying six LC-130H Ski-Herc transports carried out 359 missions between McMurdo Station, Antarctica, and eighteen inland Antarctic destinations, transporting more than seven million pounds of cargo and fuel and more than 1,600 passengers. The LC-130H crews were also called on to provide aerial reconnaissance and communication links to a disabled Russian vessel, allowing for a Royal New Zealand Air Force C-130 crew to later airdrop three parcels on an ice floe next to the ailing ship.

Aircrews and maintainers from the 109th Airlift Wing took off on 18 October 2013 to begin the unit's annual support of the National Science Foundation in the Antarctic. Seven LC-130s were on the ice between October through February 2014. The wing has deployed 479 Air National Guardsmen to Antarctica since the season began in October, with an average of 150 on duty at any one time. The Airmen deploy for 30–60 days each, working two 12-hour shifts six days each week, running supplies and people to field camps across the continent and the South Pole station.

The wing has completed 38 more missions than the 181 which the Airmen had planned to execute in 2014. In addition to the routine support the 109th AW gives each year, the 109th AW will also support U.S. Antarctic research efforts by flying 1,100 researchers and support staff, and 43 tons of cargo, from McMurdo Station, Antarctica, to New Zealand.

The 109th Airlift Wing provided transportation for US National Guard and Canadian Reserve troops in a joint tactical insertion exercise off the coast of Canada in 2023.

== Lineage ==
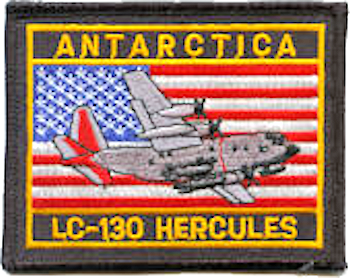
Unit Antarctica patch

109th Military Airlift Group

- Established as the 109th Fighter Group (Air Defense) and allotted to the Air National Guard on 15 April 1956

Activated in the New York Air National Guard on 1 May 1956 and received federal recognition
Redesignated 109th Tactical Fighter Group on 10 November 1958
Redesignated 109th Air Transport Group, Heavy on 2 January 1960 (Note: The Department of the Air Force directed on 20 June 1962 that the group be redesignated 109th Combat Airlift Group effective 1 July 1962. This action was revoked on 28 June 1962)
Redesignated 109th Military Airlift Group on 1 January 1966
Inactivated on 15 March 1971
Consolidated with the 109th Tactical Airlift Group on 17 August 1987

109th Airlift Wing
Constituted as the 109th Tactical Airlift Group and allotted to the Air National Guard
Activated on 16 March 1971
Consolidated with the 109th Military Airlift Group on 17 August 1987
Redesignated 109th Airlift Group on 15 March 1992
Redesignated 109th Airlift Wing on 1 October 1995

=== Assignments ===
- 107th Air Defense Wing (later 107th Tactical Fighter Wing), 1 May 1956
- 133d Air Transport Wing, 2 January 1960
- 106th Air Transport Wing (later 106th Military Airlift Wing), 1 January 1963
- New York Air National Guard, 1 February 1968
- 133d Tactical Airlift Wing (later 133d Airlift Wing), 16 March 1971
- New York Air National Guard, 1 October 1995

Gaining Commands

Air Defense Command, 1 May 1956
Military Air Transport Service, 2 January 1960
Military Airlift Command, 1 January 1966
Tactical Air Command, 16 March 1971
Military Airlift Command, 1 December 1974
Air Mobility Command 1 June 1992 - present

=== Components ===
- 109th Operations Group, 1 October 1995 – present
- 139th Aeromedical Evacuation Squadron
- 139th Fighter-Interceptor (later Tactical Fighter, Air Transport, Military Airlift, Tactical Airlift, Airlift) Squadron, 1 May 1956 – 1 October 1961; 1 December 1962 – 1 October 1995

=== Stations ===
- Schenectady County Airport (later Stratton Air National Guard Base), Schenectady, New York, 1 May 1956 – present

Antarctic operations from: Christchurch International Airport, Christchurch, New Zealand, 20 February 1998 - present and Williams Field, Antarctica, 1998 - present

=== Aircraft ===
- F-94B Starfire, 1956–1957
- F-86H Sabre, 1957–1960
- C-97 Stratofreighter, 1960–1971
- C-130A Hercules, 1971–1975
- C-130D Hercules, 1975–1984
- C-130H Hercules, 1984–Present
- LC-130H Hercules, 1984–Present
