= Phoenix Airport =

Phoenix Airport may refer to:

- Airports within the metro area of Phoenix, Arizona, United States:
  - Phoenix Sky Harbor International Airport
  - Phoenix Deer Valley Airport
  - Phoenix Goodyear Airport
  - Phoenix–Mesa Gateway Airport
- Sanya Phoenix International Airport in Sanya, Hainan, China
- Phoenix Airfield, Antarctica
