= Ice Runway (McMurdo Sound) =

Sea ice airport for McMurdo Station, Antarctica

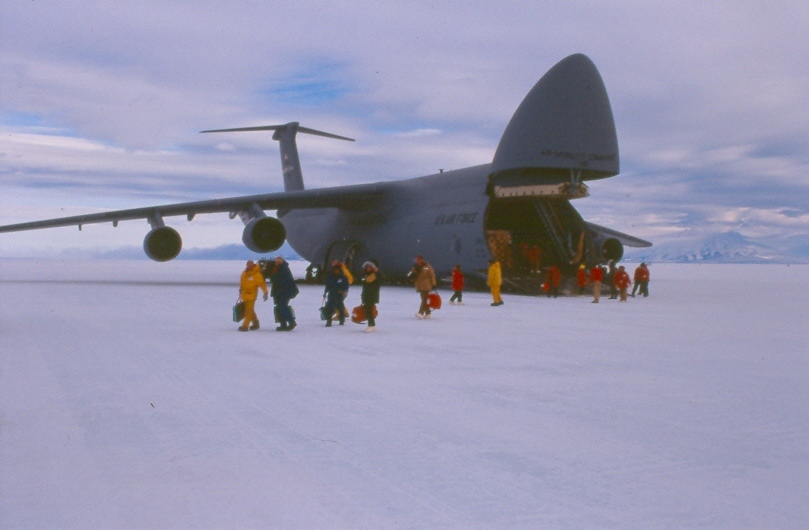
- C-5 Galaxy unloading at sea ice runway, near McMurdo Station, 1999.
- IATA: none; ICAO: NZIR

Summary
- Location: McMurdo Sound, Antarctica
- Elevation AMSL: 1 ft (0.30 m)
- Coordinates: 77°51′14″S 166°28′07″E

Map
- Location of airfield in Antarctica

Runways
Direction	Length		Surface
Direction	ft	m	Surface
11/29	10,000	3,048	Ice
16/34	10,000	3,048	Ice
- Source: DAFIF

The Annual Sea-Ice Runway (ICAO: NZIR) is a type of seasonal ice runway made on frozen McMurdo Sound for the U.S. Antarctic Program during the summer Antarctic field season in proximity to Hut Point Peninsula, which has McMurdo Station and Scott Base. The ice runway was used since the 1950s when the bases were established, but has fallen out favor in 2010s in favor of two runways on land, at Williams Field (NZWD) and the compacted snow runway at Phoenix Airfield (NZFX), which replaced Pegasus Field (NZPG) in 2017. The ice runway was prepared on frozen sea ice on open water in McMurdo Sound, so its exact location varied slightly year to year. The ice was strong enough to land large transport aircraft with traditional landing gear, and no aircraft broke through the ice in its operation; however, parked aircraft had to be monitored if they lowered the ice too much, due to the special properties of floating ice.

The sea ice runway was capable of handling wheeled aircraft, which have included to date: Lockheed C-5 Galaxy, Lockheed C-141 Starlifter, Boeing C-17 Globemaster III, Lockheed C-130 Hercules and Lockheed P-3 Orion. In the summer season of 2009/2010 the RNZAF trialed a modified Boeing 757 operationally. The intention was to use the Boeing 757 for passenger transport, thereby freeing up capacity for C-17 cargo space.

The runway was usually operated from October to December, after which time the sea ice would break up. The ice for the runway would be over 2 meters/yards thick to land an aircraft like the C-17. (In context, this time period corresponds to the Antarctic dawn there, when McMurdo switches from 24 hour darkness to light)

The annual sea-ice runway for wheeled aircraft was constructed at the start of each season and used until early December when the sea ice began to break up. Subsequently, flight operations were moved back to Williams Field. Pilots landing C-17 Globemaster III cargo aircraft on the sea ice runway reported that the surface was stable, not unlike landing on concrete. The similarity with land bases ended when the jet aircraft rolled to a stop, however. The nearly 450,000 pound (= 201 tons) weight of the plane, including cargo and passengers, caused it to sink into the ice, albeit only a matter of inches. A laser light was trained on the aircraft to measure the settlement rate. The $200 million aircraft was moved to a new location on the six-foot-thick ice as a safety measure if the 10-inch red line was reached, according to the News Tribune in Tacoma, Washington.

== Shift to new airfields ==
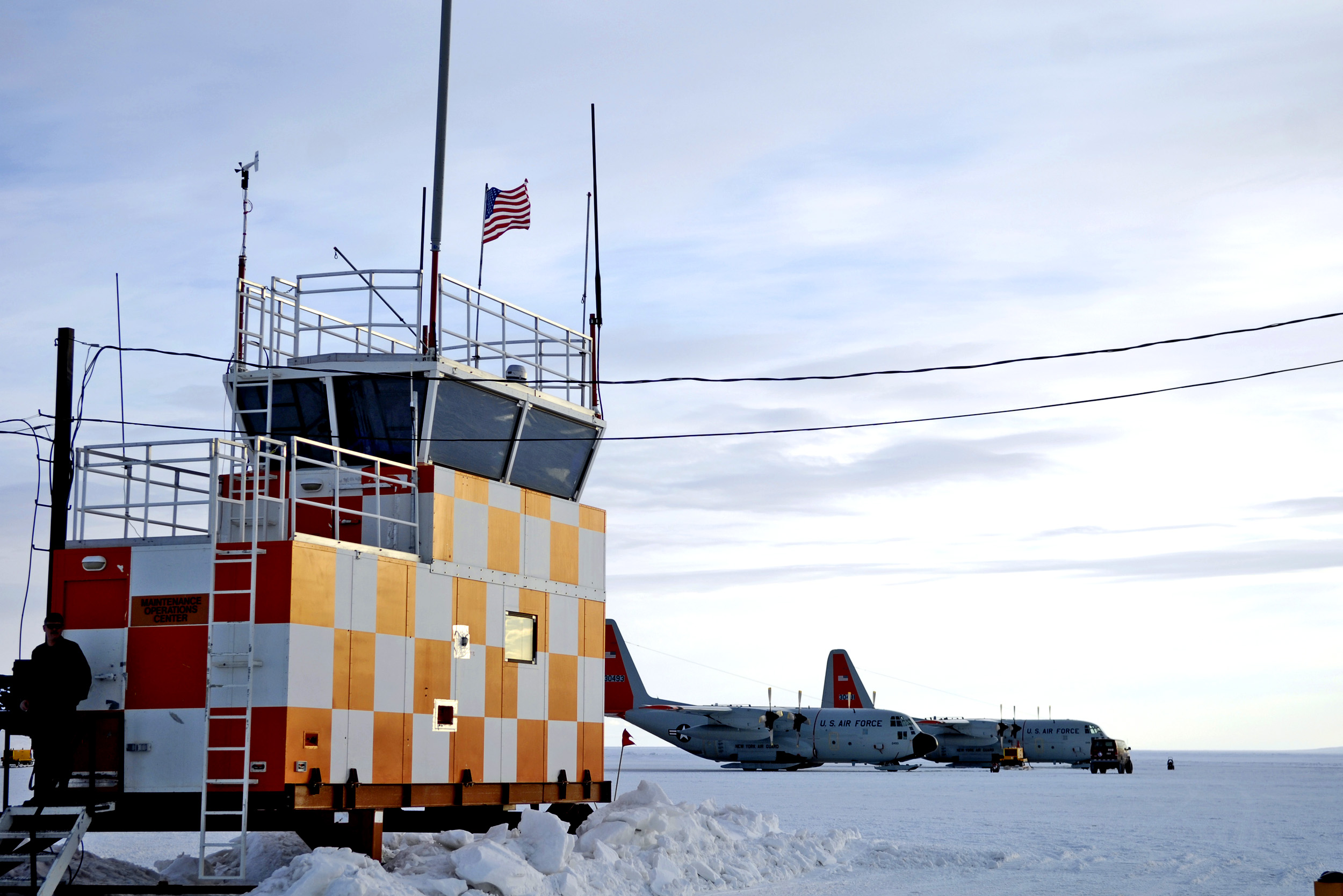
Control tower for the annual sea ice runway, 2007

Whilst no formal records have been located of a permanent decommissioning of the McMurdo sea-ice runway, interest in eliminating its use began with the development of Pegasus Field in 1992. Concept studies were commenced into the possibility of downscaling from three McMurdo airports to two or one, leading to Pegasus being trialled as a replacement for the sea-ice runway at the start of the annual summer season in 2008-09. Based on the results of this work proving that Pegasus Field was unsuitable for use during the warmer part of the summer due to excessive snow melt, the development of Phoenix Airfield was commenced in 2014 with the intention of it being capable of operating for wheeled aircraft throughout the entire summer, thus proving the single airport concept. Following the 2017 opening of Phoenix Field, all references to the sea-ice runway were removed from the USAP website and official documentation.

The sea-ice runway site is still shown in flight tracking and airport information websites, leaving unresolved the question of its current official status. However, it has never been a fixed permanent location in any of its years of operation because of the annual melting of the ice in McMurdo Sound during the Antarctic summer.

== Science of ice runways ==
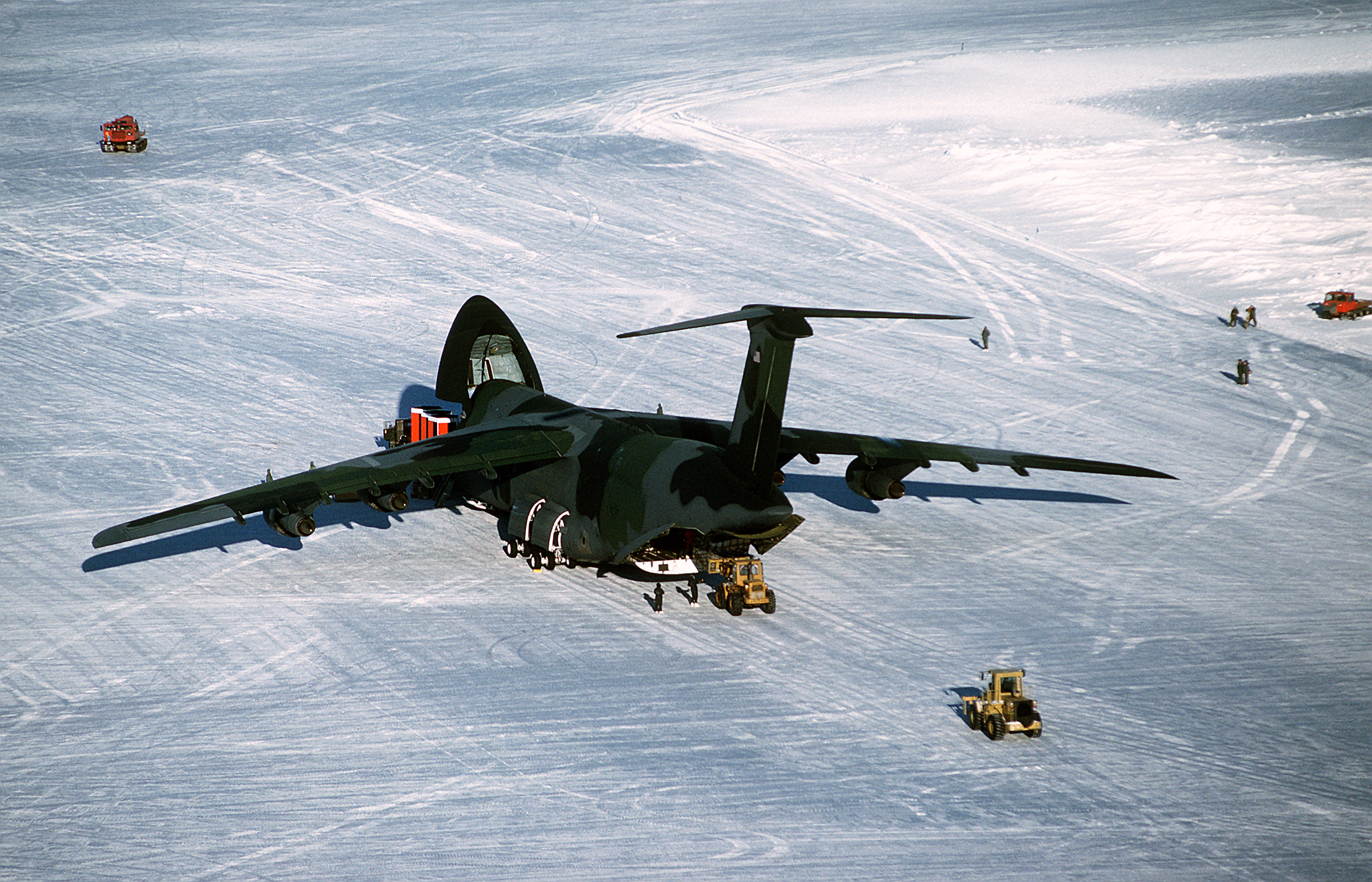
C-5B Galaxy lands at McMurdo for Operation Deep Freeze '90

Ice runways over water have been studied and one reason for their complexity is that there are two different physical responses of the ice: an elastic response to landing, and a visco-elastic response to aircraft parked on floating ice. The development of the finite-element VISICE software supported safely landing large aircraft like the C-5 Galaxy on the McMurdo Ice Runway.

== Accidents and incidents ==
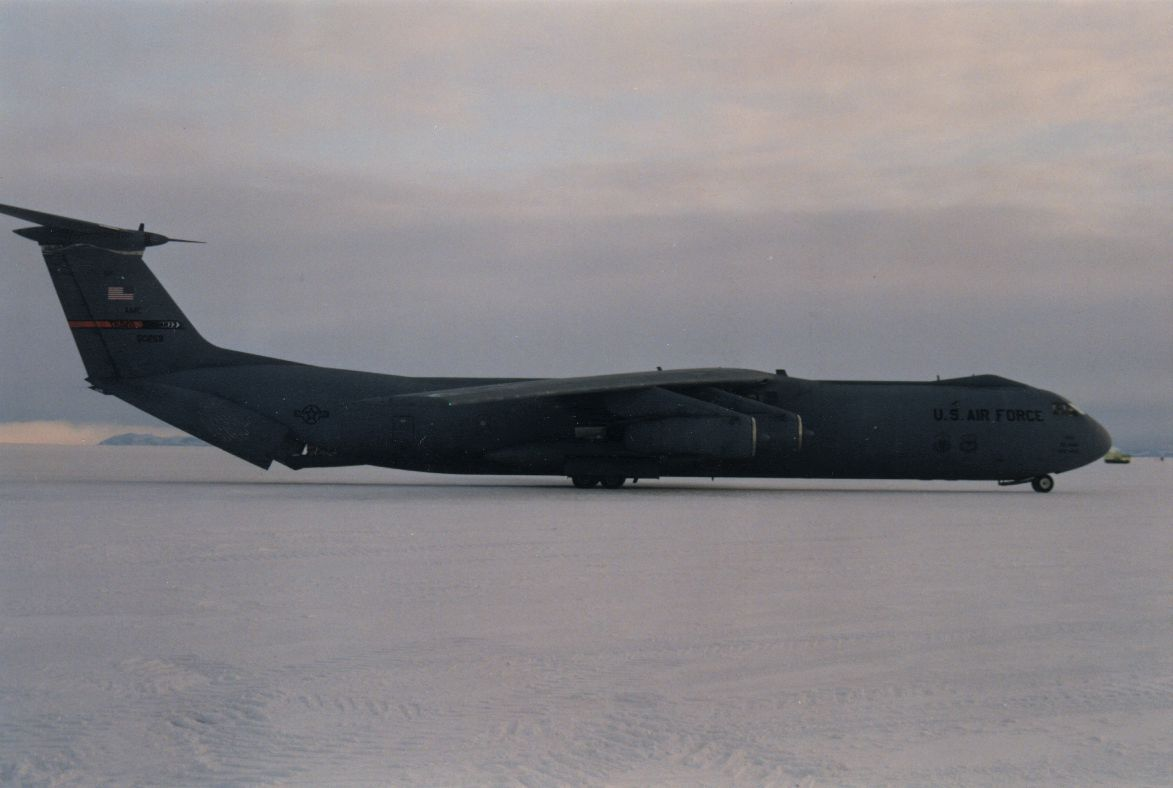
C-141 Starlifter on Ice Runway, near McMurdo Station, 1996.

- 18 October 1956: a Lockheed P2V-2N Neptune (122465) of the US Navy crashed on landing, killing 4 of the 8 occupants. The Neptune was arriving from Christchurch without enough fuel to turn back and weather at McMurdo was storming; the plane suddenly turned right and the nose fell during landing, and the Neptune was demolished on impact.
- 31 October 1960: a United States Navy Lockheed EC-121 Warning Star from Oceanographic Development Squadron Eight crashed while attempting to land on the Ice Runway. The pilot and co-pilot were badly injured, but the other crew received minor injuries or were uninjured. The aircraft was not recovered, and was simply allowed to sink when the ice melted in the spring.

== See also ==
- List of airports in Antarctica
- McMurdo Sound
- Blue ice runway (this is another type of ice runway, but might be over a glacier for example, not floating sea ice)
