= Lockheed LC-130 =

Ski-equipped military transport aircraft

LC-130
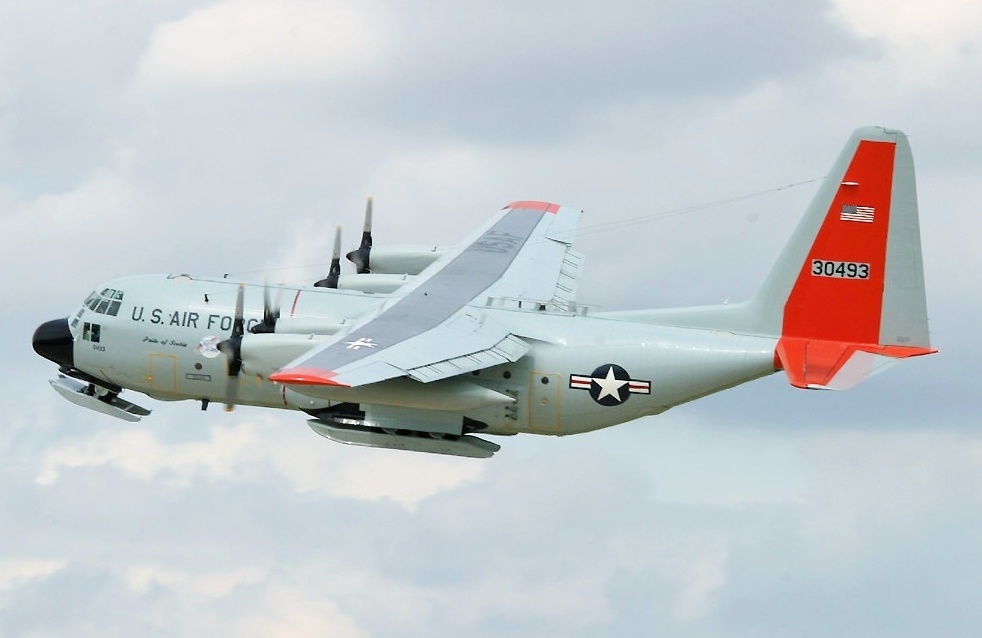
- A 139th Airlift Squadron LC-130 after takeoff

General information
- Type: Ski-equipped military transport aircraft
- National origin: United States
- Manufacturer: Lockheed; Lockheed Martin
- Status: Active
- Primary users: United States Air Force United States Navy (former)

History
- First flight: 1956
- Developed from: C-130 Hercules

The Lockheed LC-130 is a ski-equipped United States Air Force variant of the C-130 Hercules used in the Arctic and Antarctic. Ten are currently in service with the 109th Airlift Wing of the New York Air National Guard.

== Design and development ==
The LC-130 started as a prototype model developed by modifying a C-130A with skis in 1956. In January 1957, Lockheed conducted the first flight of a C-130A (S/N 55-0021) modified with a ski-wheel configuration that could operate from conventional runways and snow or ice-covered surfaces. In February, Task Force Slide began in Bemidji, Minnesota, to develop, test, and validate procedures for what would become the C-130D. Flights were conducted on the frozen surface of nearby lakes and included Rocket Assisted Takeoff (RATO). Task Force Slide continued into 1958 and by the end of the year, 12 C-130As were modified with skis and hydraulics. Now designated C-130Ds, they were delivered to the 61st Troop Carrier Squadron to support construction of two DEW Line radar sites on the Greenland ice cap. Having proven capability, 1959, HQ USAF tasked seven of these aircraft to support Project Deep Freeze 60 in the Antarctic. That same year, the first four factory equipped, ski-based Hercules were produced under the Navy designation of UV-1L. These C-130s are USAF C-130B models. Later in the program the designation was changed from UV-1L to C-130BL. This designation was again later changed to LC-130F when aircraft nomenclature was standardized for all services by the U.S. Department of Defense in 1962. These four aircraft were bought by the U.S. Navy to support the Navy's Antarctic expedition that was ongoing at the time. The Navy also bought one LC-130R model in 1968. The National Science Foundation bought the second set of aircraft as replacement aircraft. The Polar Program Division of the Foundation had assumed management of the Antarctic Program in the early 1970s. These aircraft were designated LC-130R and were delivered in two lots: the first lot of three in 1974 and the remaining two in 1976.

The primary mission of the LC-130 is supporting the scientific community in Antarctica by transporting cargo and personnel from the McMurdo Station to field stations and camps, including the Amundsen–Scott South Pole Station.

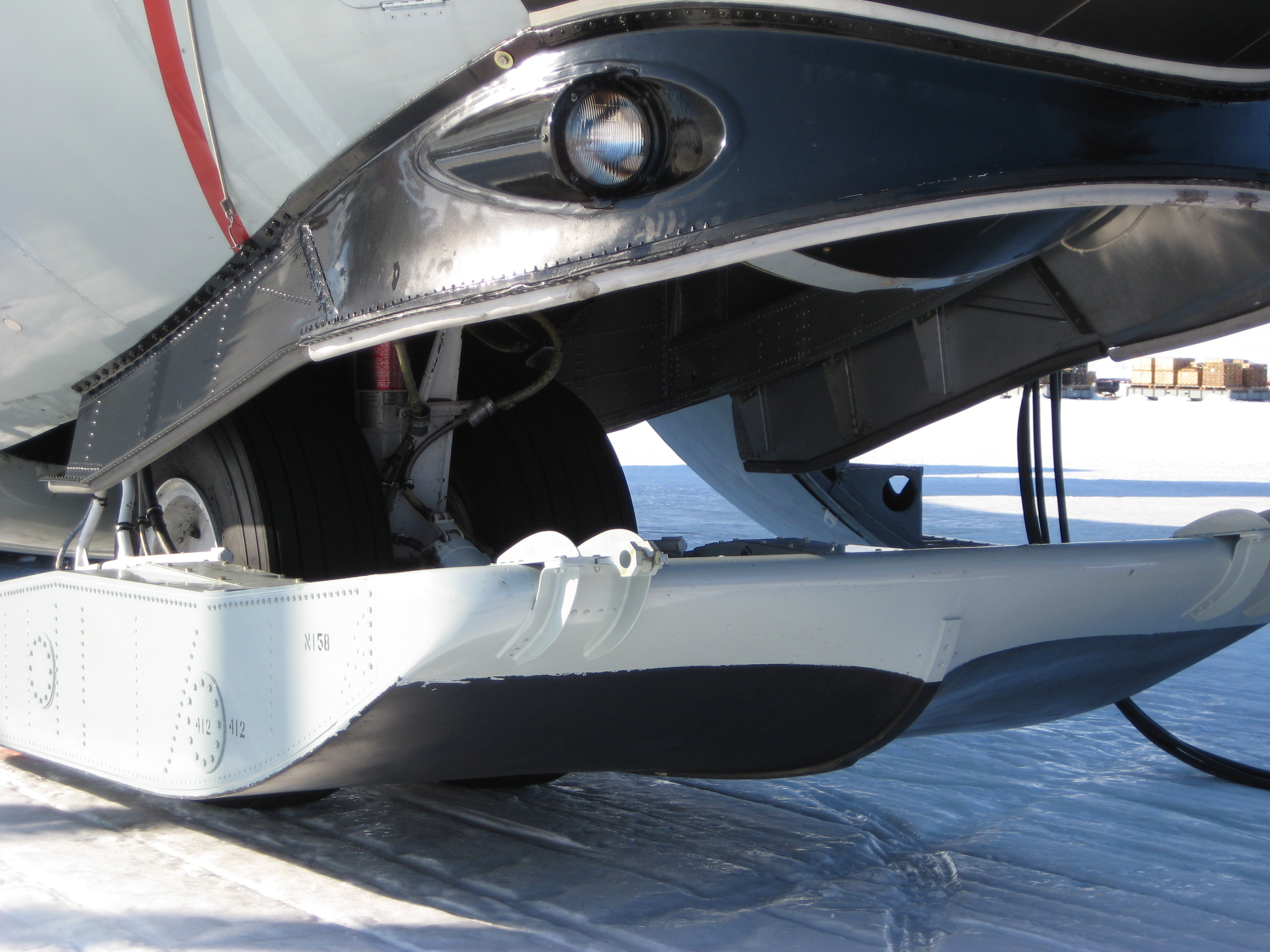
Close up of LC-130 nose ski

The aircraft are equipped with retractable skis that allow the aircraft to land on snow and ice as well as on conventional runways. The aircraft have provisions for using rocket-assisted-takeoff (RATO) rockets, four on each side of the aircraft, that are installed and used when the LC-130 operates from rough, unprepared snow surfaces, sticky snow or when shorter takeoff runs are needed. Originally the expended rocket bottles were jettisonable, but due to several accidents which occurred when a bottle detached from the aircraft during takeoff, the mounting provisions were changed so that the bottles could not be released in the air.

== Operational history ==
Video of rocket-assisted takeoff from snow

The Navy Antarctic Development Squadron Six (First designated VX-6, then VXE-6 from 1969) originally operated the LC-130 aircraft. Initially, VXE-6 was home based at the Naval Air Station Quonset Point, Rhode Island and later at the Naval Air Station Point Mugu, California. Operation of the aircraft was transferred in 1999 to the 109th Airlift Wing of the New York Air National Guard when Navy support of the Antarctic program was terminated. VXE-6 was decommissioned after 44 years of science and cargo support missions in support of "Operation Deep Freeze".

There have been two crashes in Antarctica. The first crash occurred in 1971 at an ice runway 860 miles (1,380 km) from McMurdo Station as a result of two JATO bottles ejecting improperly and striking the plane's propeller. This aircraft's registration was 148321. The second crash occurred when a second similar aircraft (159131) was destroyed, while delivering replacement parts for the first aircraft; this resulted in two fatalities and nine injuries. The repaired aircraft was dug out of the snow, had temporary repairs and then flown to McMurdo Station in 1987 at a cost of $10 million and thence to Christchurch, New Zealand. It re-entered service and spent several more seasons doing antarctic work. The aircraft was retired to Davis-Monthan AFB sometime after 1998.

Currently all LC-130 aircraft are operated by the New York Air National Guard and are based at the Air National Guard's facility at Schenectady County Airport. There are two versions. Seven aircraft are LC-130H-2 (Three of these were Navy LC-130R from VXE-6 converted to LC-130H-2). Three are the LC-130H-3 model.

== Aircraft on display ==
- A D-model LC-130 is on display at the main entrance to Stratton Air National Guard Base, located at the Schenectady County Airport in Schenectady, NY.
- The Pima Air & Space Museum has a 109th Tactical Airlift Group ski-equipped C-130D on display, one of the original twelve built before replacement of the fleet with the H model.

== See also ==
Related development

- C-130 Hercules
- C-130J Super Hercules
- List of C-130 Hercules crashes
- AC-130 Spectre/Spooky
- Lockheed DC-130
- Lockheed EC-130
- Lockheed HC-130
- Lockheed MC-130
- Lockheed WC-130

Aircraft of comparable role, configuration, and era

- Antonov An-12
- Blackburn Beverley
- Transall C-160

Related lists

- List of active United States military aircraft
