= Williams Field =

Airstrip in Antarctica

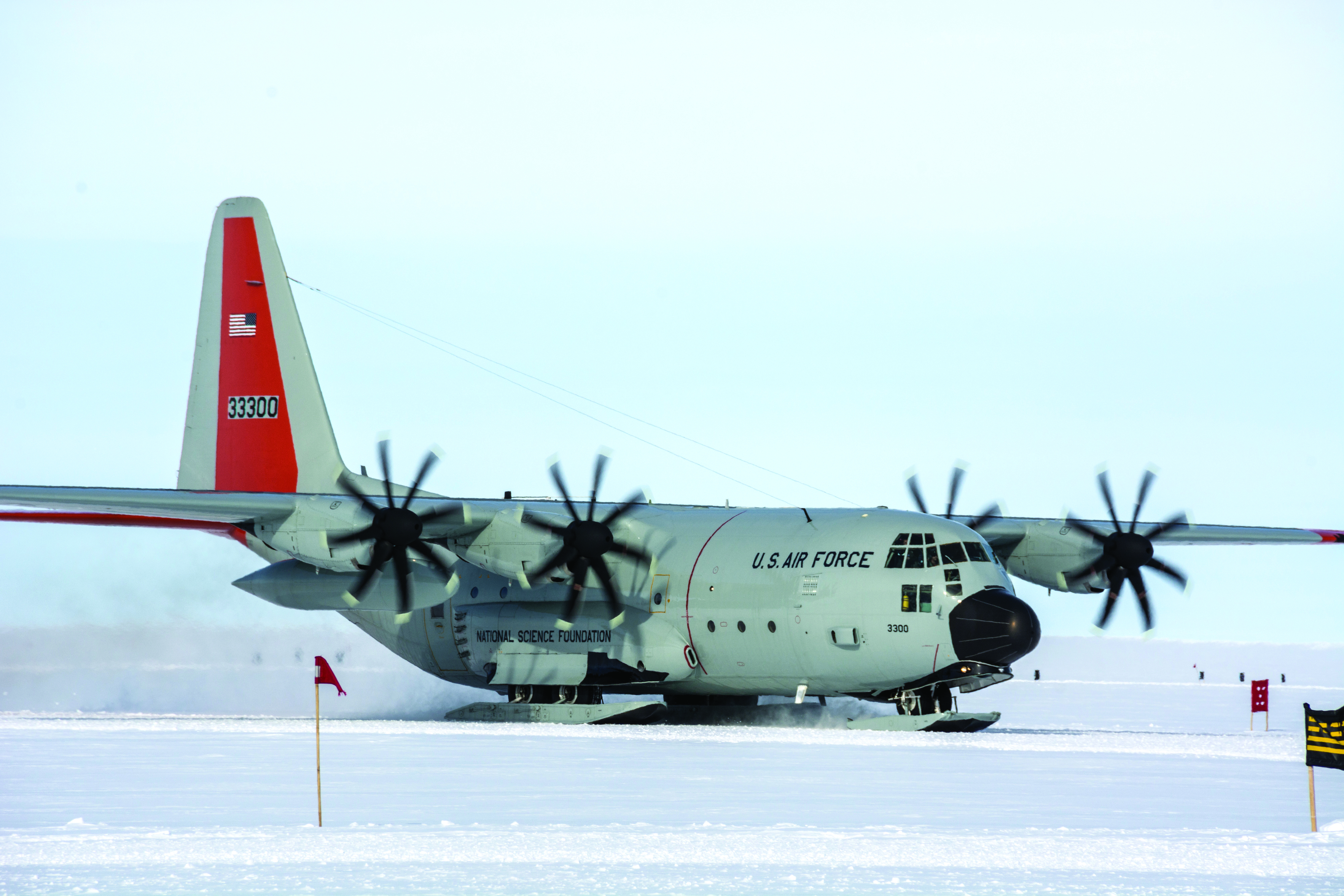
- IATA: none; ICAO: NZWD

Summary
- Airport type: Public
- Location: McMurdo Station, Antarctica
- Elevation AMSL: 68 ft / 21 m
- Coordinates: 77°52′03″S 167°03′24″E

Map
- Location of airfield in Antarctica

Runways
Direction	Length		Surface
Direction	ft	m	Surface
07/25	10,000	3,048	Snow
15/33	10,000	3,048	Snow
- Source: DAFIF

Williams Field or Willy Field (ICAO: NZWD) is a United States Antarctic Program airfield in Antarctica. Williams Field consists of two snow runways located on approximately 8 meters (25 ft) of compacted snow, lying on top of 8–10 ft of ice, floating over 550 meters (1,800 ft) of water. The airport, which is approximately seven miles from Ross Island, serves McMurdo Station and New Zealand's Scott Base. Williams Field is the major airfield for on-continent aircraft operations in Antarctica.

Williams Field is named in honor of Richard T. Williams, a United States Navy equipment operator who drowned when his D-8 tractor broke through the ice on January 6, 1956. Williams and other personnel were participants in the first Operation Deep Freeze, a U.S. military mission to build a permanent science research station at McMurdo Station in anticipation of the International Geophysical Year 1957–58.

== Operation ==
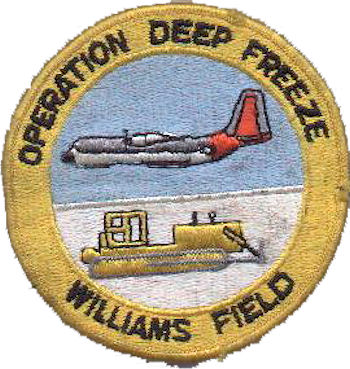

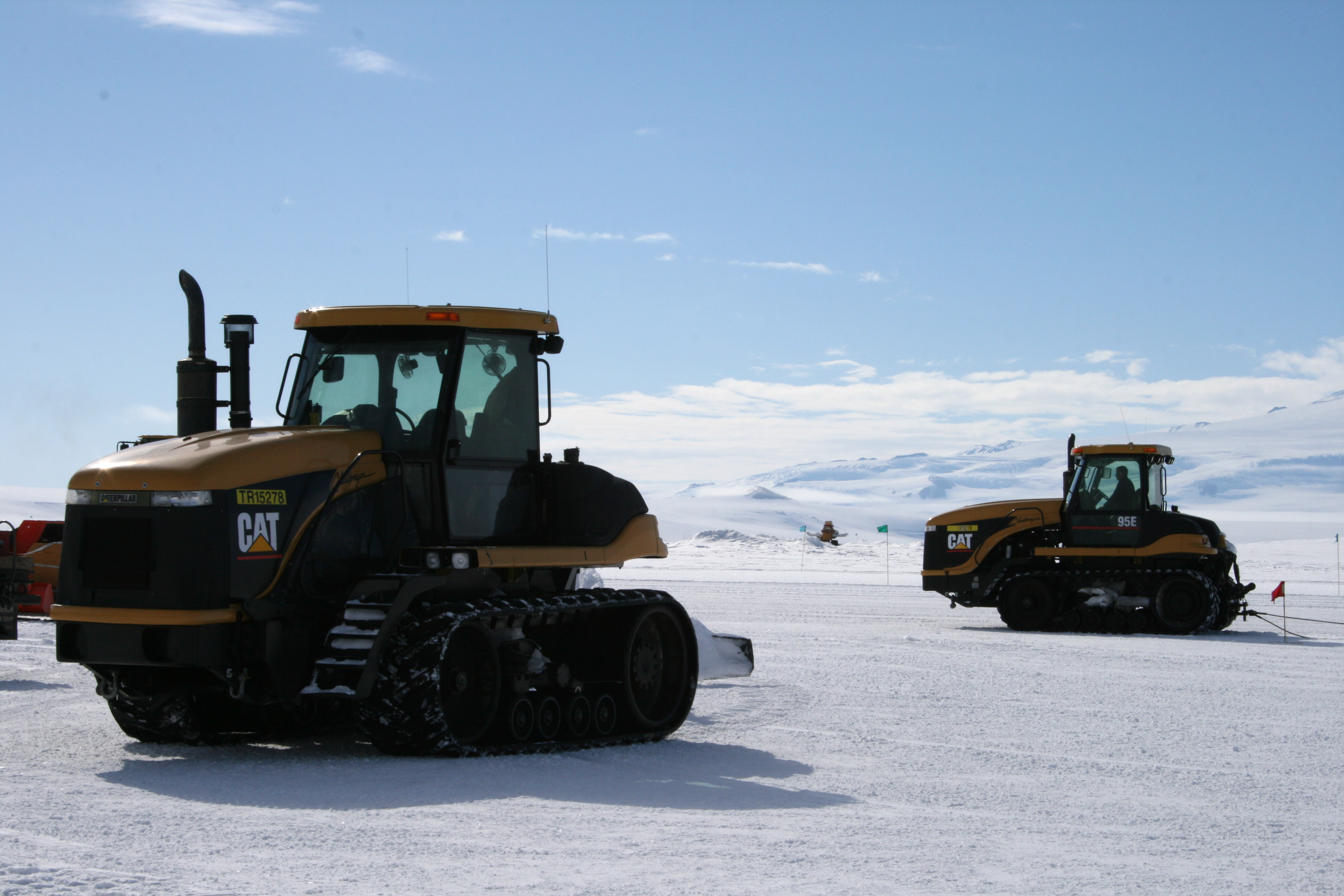
Caterpillar Challenger machines perform constant runway grooming

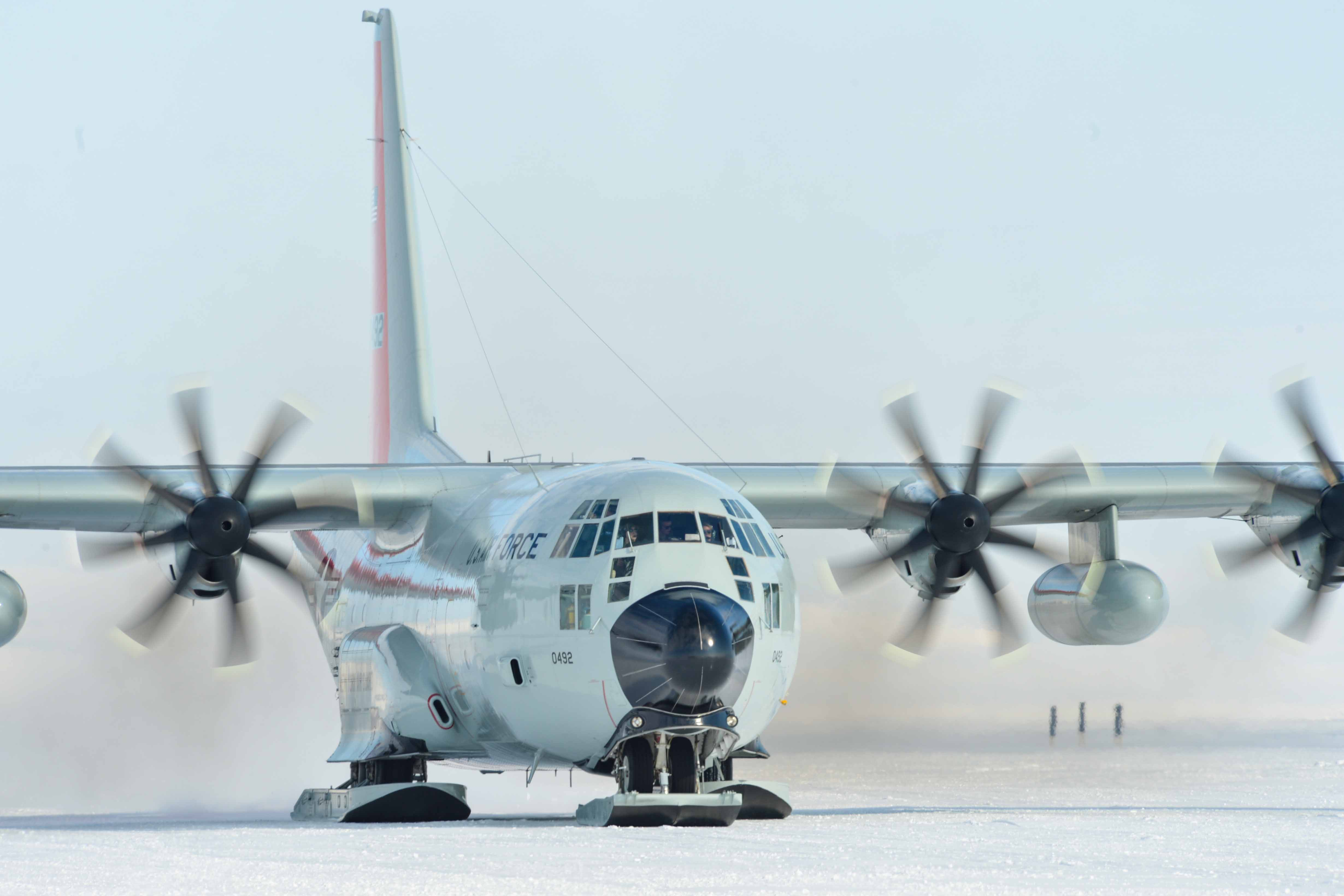
Ski-equipped Hercules taxis on snow runway, 2023

The skiway is typically in operation from November through the end of February (Antarctic summer). The other McMurdo Station airfield is nearby Phoenix Airfield.

The Williams Field snow runway is known locally as "Willy's Field". The airfield is a groomed snow surface that can support ski-equipped aircraft landings only. A cluster of facilities for flight operations, referred to as "Willy Town", includes several rows of containers for workers and a galley. Willy Field Tavern, a bar at the airfield, closed in 1994.

Air Traffic Control services are provided by Williams Tower / Approach (Willie Tower), and by McMurdo Center (Mac Center) when the tower is closed. The McMurdo Weather Office provides weather forecasting for Williams Field while onsite Controllers and Weather Observers provide hourly and special weather observations.

Aviation fuel at Williams Field is pumped in a 16 km (10 mi) flexible pipe from McMurdo Station. Fuel is stored in up to 12 tanks. The fuel tanks, like other structures at the airfield, are mounted on skis or runners for portability. Generator and heating fuel is delivered to the station by fuel trucks from McMurdo Station, with fuels stored at the individual structures.

The extraordinary conditions encountered at Williams Field include the fact that the airfield is in a continuous slow slide towards the sea. Seaward movement of the floating McMurdo Ice Shelf upon which the airfield is constructed has forced Williams Field to be relocated three times since its original construction. Workers last moved the airfield during the 1984–85 season. Subsequently, personnel housed at Williams lived in buildings constructed on sleds to facilitate relocation. In the past, up to 450 people were housed at the airfield, according to the National Science Foundation. In 1994 the National Science Foundation constructed two dorm buildings at McMurdo Station. Transport to Williams Field uses various vehicles including Foremost Delta II and Ford E-350 vans.

== Current aircraft in use ==
- Lockheed LC-130 – New York Air National Guard
- Basler BT-67 – Kenn Borek Air
- de Havilland Canada DHC-6 Twin Otter – Kenn Borek Air

== Historical notes ==
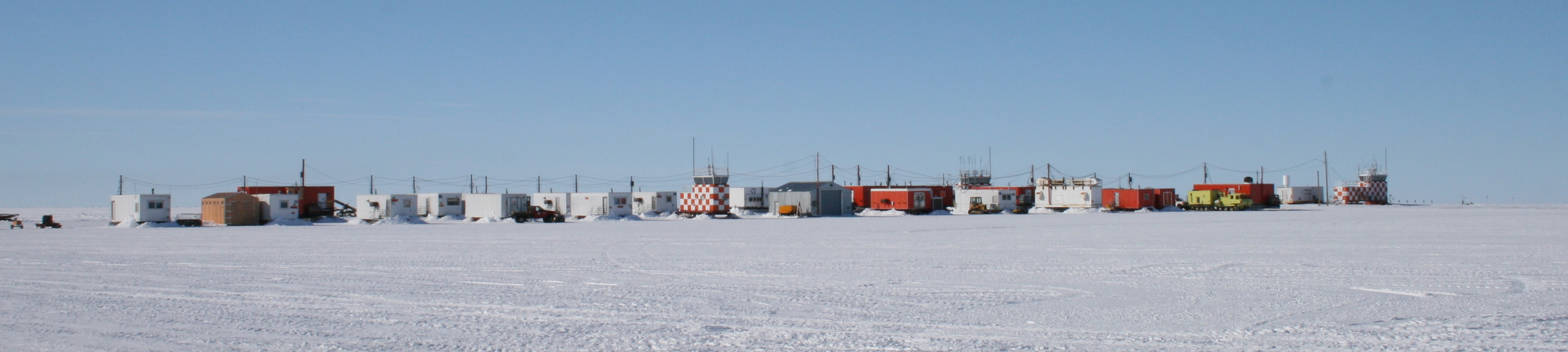
Williams Field support structures as seen from the cargo line

- 1957: Pan American Boeing 377 Stratocruiser makes round trip from Christchurch to McMurdo Sound. First civilian flight to Antarctica.
- 1960: U.S. Navy WV-2 BuNo 126513 crashes after landing short of the ice runway.
- 1960: First ski-equipped C-130 Hercules cargo aircraft lands in Antarctica.
- 1960: Sunspots knock out radio communications for eight days, forcing cancellation of all flights between New Zealand and McMurdo.
- 1966: First all-jet aircraft (USAF-C-141) lands at Williams.
- 1967: Earliest scheduled winter fly-in.
- 1970: U.S. Navy "Pegasus" C-121J crash lands. Aircraft is destroyed but no fatalities among the 80 persons aboard. Pegasus Field is named after this aircraft.
- 1979: Air New Zealand Flight 901 crashes on nearby Mount Erebus. 257 people died.

== Accidents and incidents ==
- 28 November 1956: a Douglas C-124C Globemaster II (52-1015) of the USAF was damaged beyond repair when the nose gear failed on landing. All 17 occupants survived; the plane's parts were used to fix two other Globemasters damaged in accidents at McMurdo earlier that year.
- 13 September 1957: a Douglas R4D-6L (DC-3) (17274) of the US Navy crashed on takeoff due to water freezing in the fuel lines. There were no fatalities; the plane was written off.
- 15 February 1971: a Lockheed LC-130F Hercules (148318) of the US Navy crashed on takeoff in poor visibility when the left main ski hit a 5.5 foot snow bank and the right wing hit the ground and broke between engines; the aircraft was destroyed by fire. There were no fatalities. The plane was taking part in Operation Deep Freeze.

== See also ==
- Blue ice runway
- Marble Point
- McMurdo Sound
- McMurdo Station
- Pegasus Field
- Ice Runway
- List of airports in Antarctica
