= Schenectady County Airport =

Airport in New York State, United States

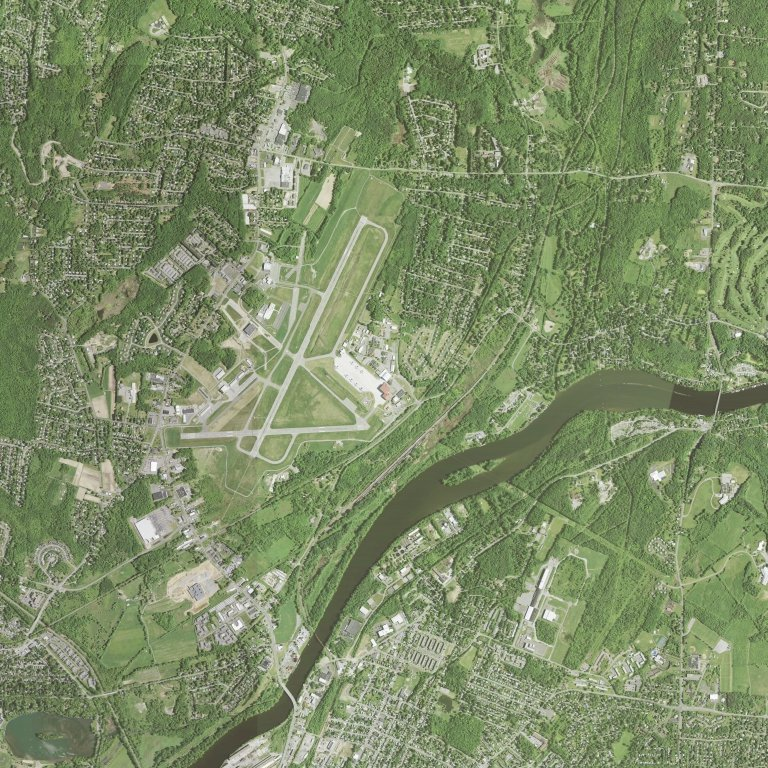
- USGS orthophoto
- IATA: SCH; ICAO: KSCH; FAA LID: SCH

Summary
- Airport type: Public
- Owner: Schenectady County
- Serves: Schenectady, New York
- Elevation AMSL: 378 ft / 115 m
- Coordinates: 42°51′09″N 073°55′44″W

Maps
- Location of airport in New York SCH (the United States)
- Interactive map of Schenectady County Airport

Runways
Direction	Length		Surface
Direction	ft	m	Surface
4/22	7,001	2,134	Asphalt
10/28	4,850	1,478	Asphalt

Statistics (2019)
- Aircraft operations (year ending 9/30/2019): 48,996
- Based aircraft: 81
- Source: Federal Aviation Administration

Schenectady County Airport (IATA: SCH, ICAO: KSCH, FAA LID: SCH) is a county-owned, public-use airport located three nautical miles (6 km) north of the central business district of Schenectady, a city in Schenectady County, New York, United States. It is included in the National Plan of Integrated Airport Systems for 2011–2015, which categorized it as a reliever airport.

Founded in 1927, the airport is home to Richmor Aviation, Fortune Air, the 109th Airlift Wing (109 AW) of the New York Air National Guard, the Empire State Aerosciences Museum, and several private aircraft.

== Stratton Air National Guard Base ==
Schenectady County Airport's military enclave is named Stratton Air National Guard Base. It has hosted the New York Air National Guard 109th Airlift Wing (in various designations) since 1949. The base is named after conservative Democratic US Representative Sam Stratton, who represented the Albany area. The wing is unique as it is the only USAF unit equipped with 10 ski-equipped LC-130 Hercules aircraft, and provides the nation's only air cargo lift capability to polar destinations. Since 1971, the 109th has played an important role in support of the National Science Foundation's research expeditions at both the North and South Poles.

Annually, the base hosts the Civil Air Patrol's New York Wing Encampment, a one-week event that teaches and applies leadership skills.

== Facilities and aircraft ==
Schenectady County Airport covers an area of 680 acres (275 ha) at an elevation of 378 feet (115 m) above mean sea level. It has two asphalt paved runways: 4/22 is 7,001 by 150 feet (2,134 x 46 m); 10/28 is 4,850 by 150 feet (1,478 x 46 m); 15/33, now a taxiway, is 2,864 by 50 feet (873 x 15 m).

For the 12-month period ending September 30, 2019, the airport had 48,996 aircraft operations, an average of 134 per day: 90% general aviation, 8% military, and 2% air taxi. At that time there were 81 aircraft based at this airport: 68 single-engine, 4 multi-engine, and 9 jet.

== See also ==
- List of airports in New York
