= Pegasus Field =

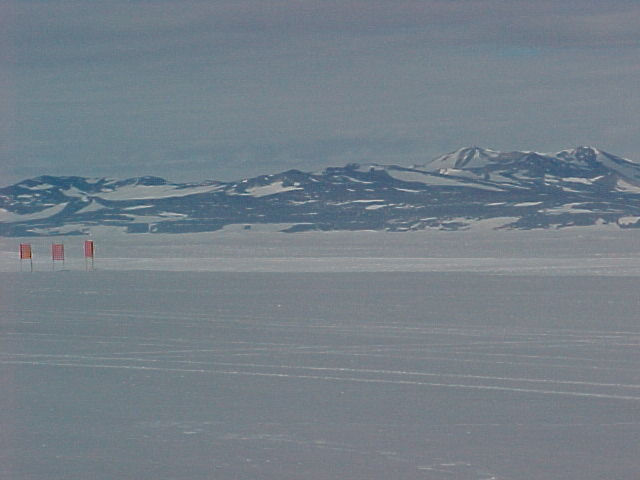
- White ice runway at Pegasus Field
- IATA: none; ICAO: NZPG

Summary
- Location: McMurdo Station, Ross Island, Antarctica
- Elevation AMSL: 18 ft / 5 m
- Coordinates: 77°57′48″S 166°31′28″E

Map
- Location of airfield in Antarctica

Runways
Direction	Length		Surface
Direction	ft	m	Surface
15/33	10,000	3,048	Ice
08/26	10,000	3,048	Ice
- Source: DAFIF

Pegasus Field (ICAO: NZPG) was an airstrip in Antarctica, the southernmost of three airfields serving McMurdo Station. It closed due to excessive melting in the summer season caused by warmer temperatures combined with dust and dirt blown in from nearby Black Island. The last flight was on December 8, 2016 and it was replaced by Phoenix Airfield (ICAO: NZFX) with flights starting in February 2017.

Pegasus was originally conceived as a blue ice runway capable of handling wheeled aircraft year-round, but as it was developed, it was enhanced with a 4-inch layer of compacted snow on top—thus more properly characterizing it as a white ice runway. Other local runways are the snow runways at Williams Field (ICAO: NZWD) that are limited to ski-equipped aircraft, and the former Ice Runway (ICAO: NZIR) on the sea-ice available during the summer Antarctic field season. The limitations of these additional fields meant that before Pegasus opened, jet-powered wheeled aircraft could only fly to/from McMurdo at the beginning of the summer season and all other flights had to be conducted using significantly smaller and slower ski planes.

The field is named after Pegasus, a C-121 Lockheed Constellation that made a forced landing on unprepared terrain in bad weather on October 8, 1970. None of the 80 on board were seriously injured. The aircraft remains in-situ near the airfield as of 2019, and has remained well preserved. It is generally covered with snow, but is occasionally excavated by visitors wishing to photograph it.

On September 11, 2008, a United States Air Force C-17 Globemaster III successfully completed the first landing in Antarctica using night-vision goggles at Pegasus Field. Previously air transport in the permanent darkness of the winter was only used in emergencies, with burning barrels of fuel to outline the runway.

== Gallery ==
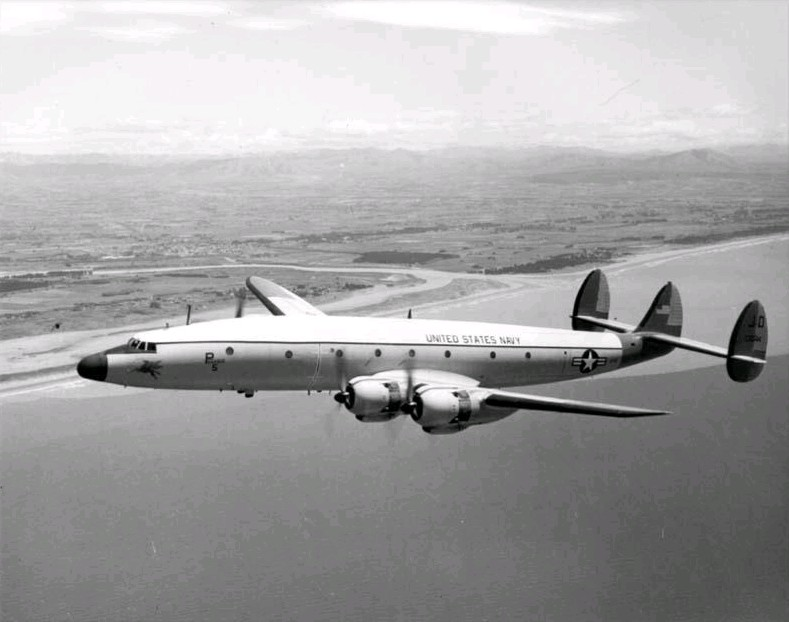
Lockheed C-121J "Pegasus " in 1965. The aircraft ultimately wrecked in Antarctica thus giving the airfield its name

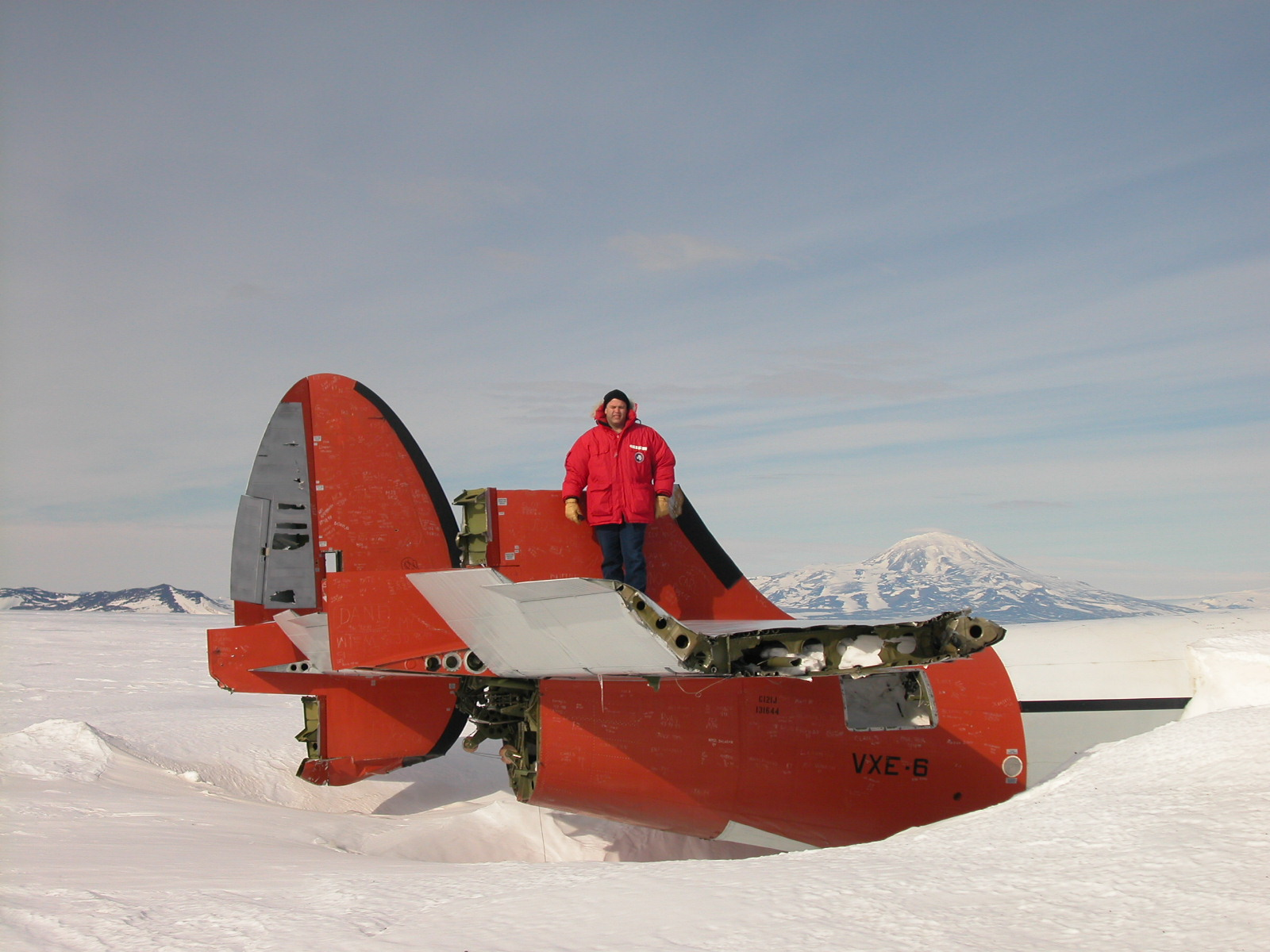
The wreck of the Pegasus, the field's namesake (2003)

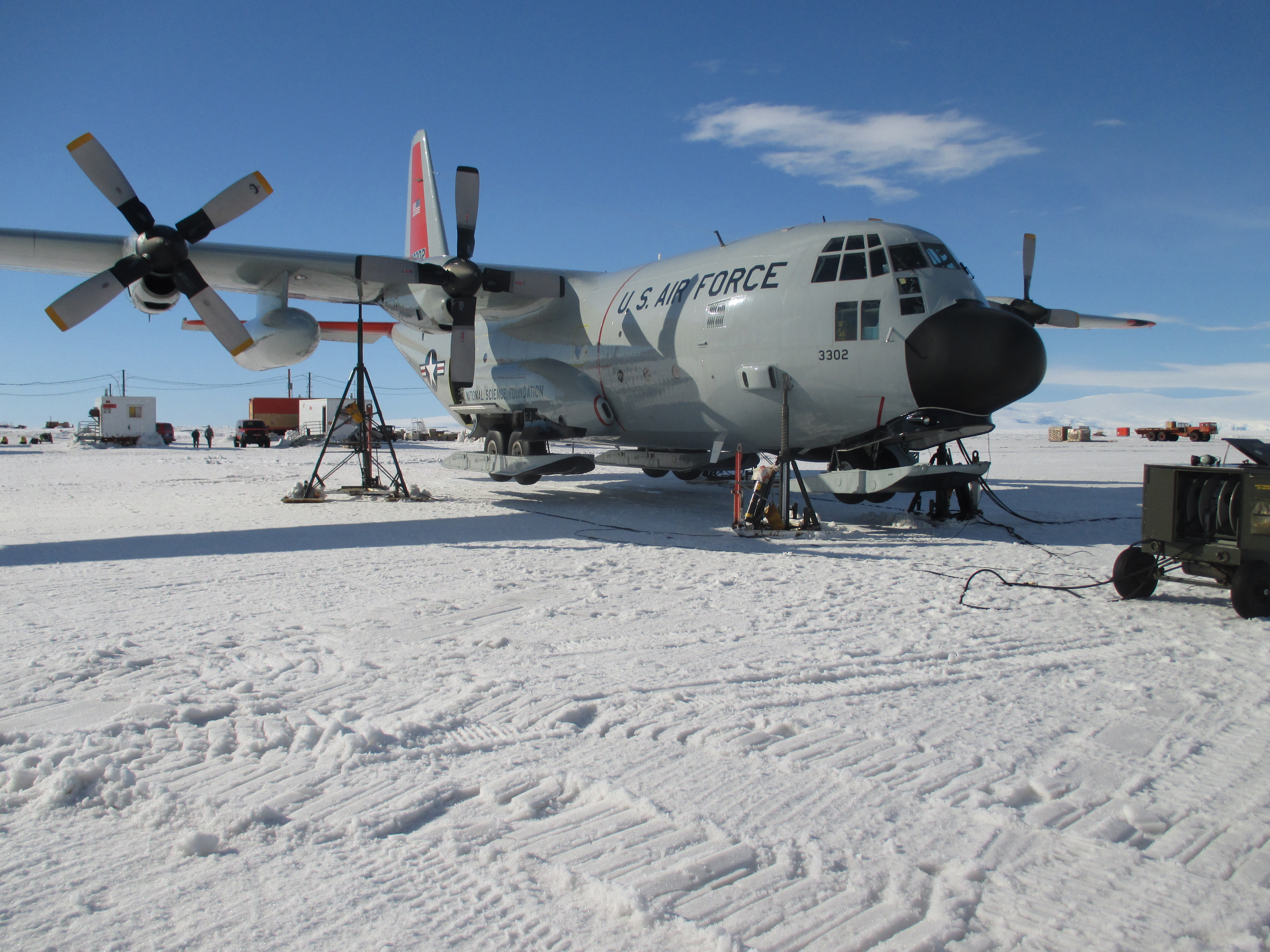
LC-130 at Pegasus Field, 2014

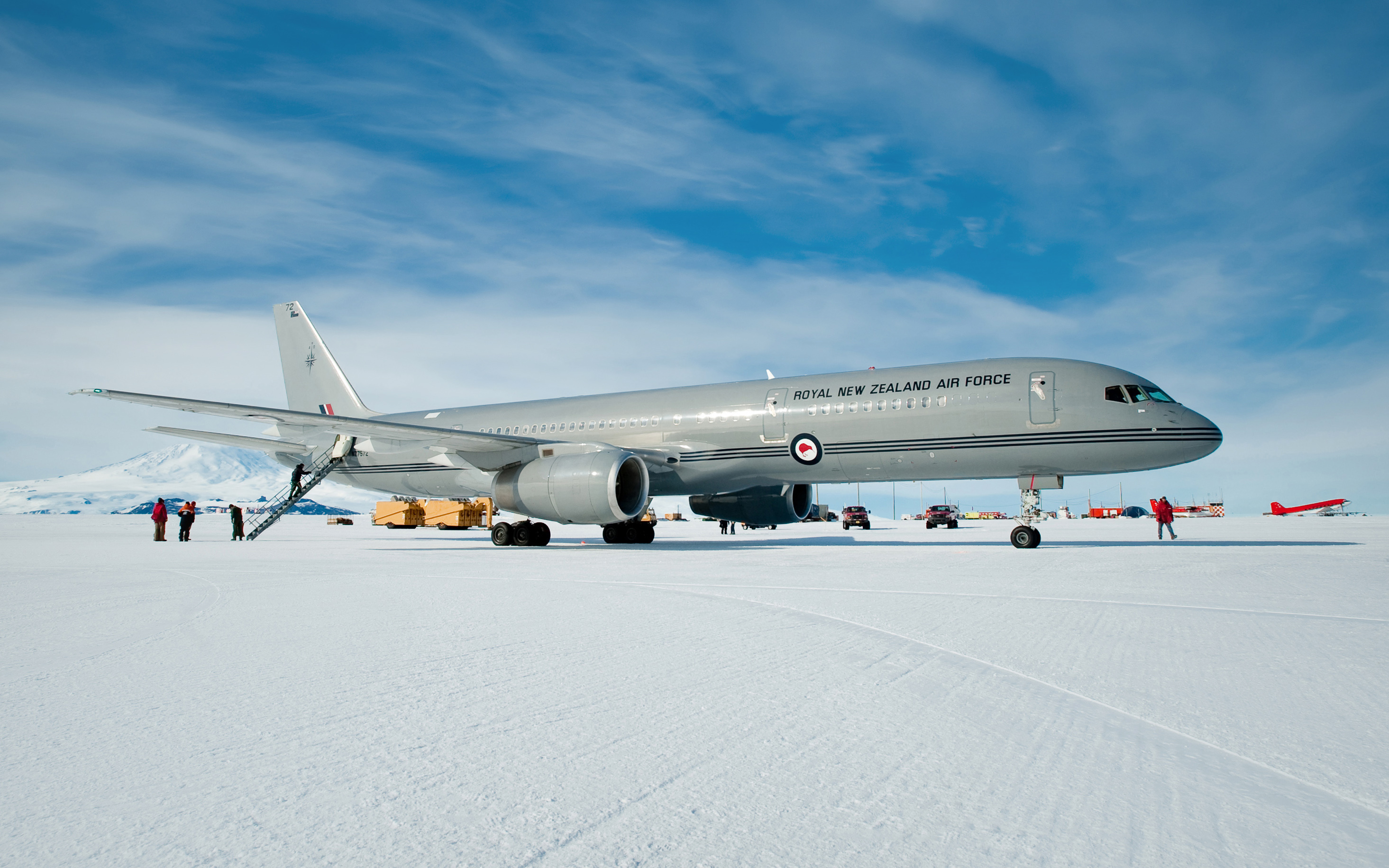
RNZAF Boeing 757 lands at Pegasus Airfield in 2009 on the Ross Ice Shelf during its maiden flight to Antarctica.

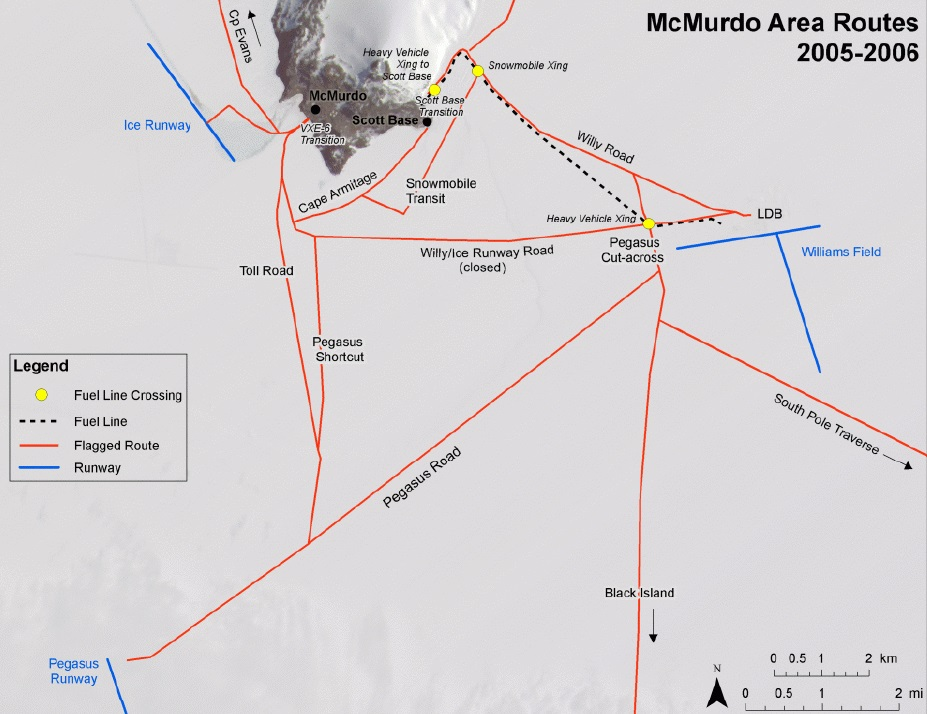
Location of Pegasus and ice traverses

== See also ==
- List of airports in Antarctica
