= Phoenix Airfield =

Phoenix Field
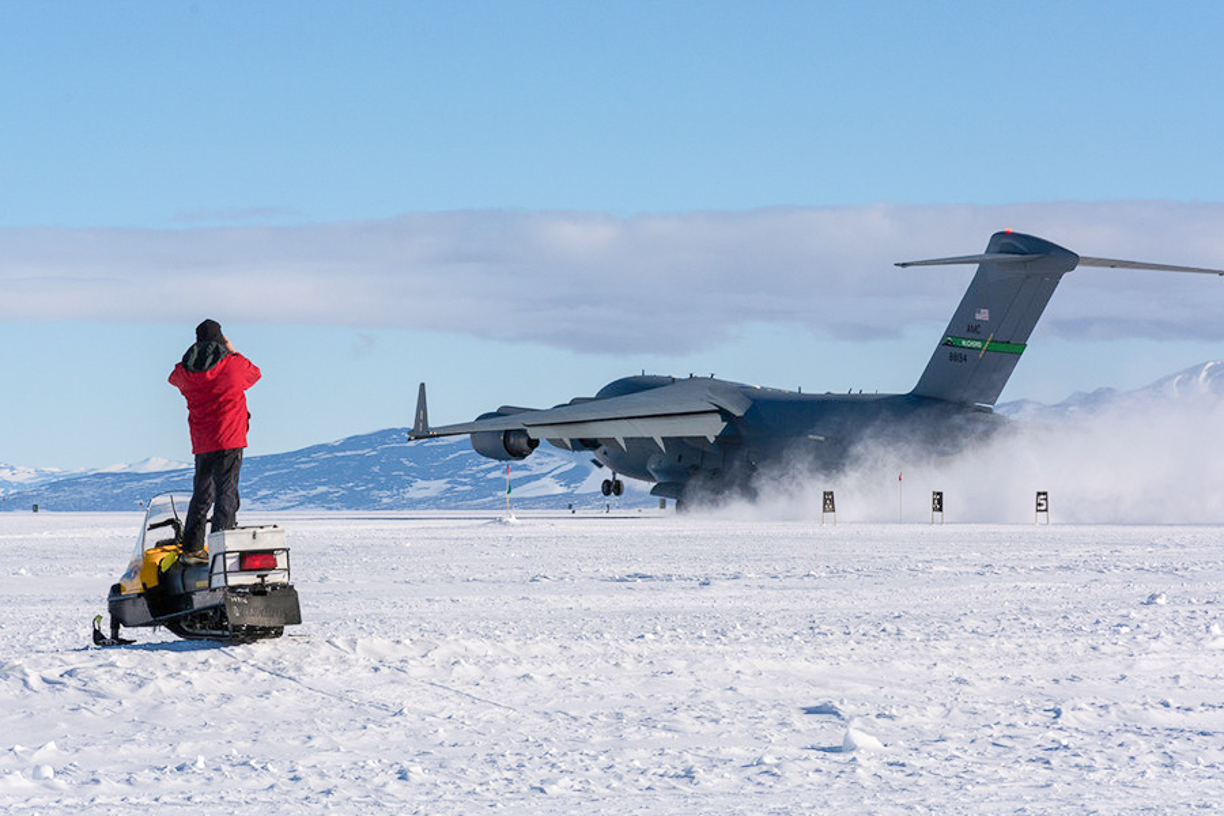
- A U.S. Air Force C-17 tests the airfield's snow runway for wheeled aircraft, 2016
- IATA: none; ICAO: NZFX

Summary
- Location: McMurdo Station, Ross Island, Antarctica
- Elevation AMSL: 35 ft / 11 m
- Coordinates: 77°57.41′S 166°45.22′E

Map
- Location of airfield in Antarctica

Runways
Direction	Length		Surface
Direction	ft	m	Surface
15/33	11,000	3,353	Compacted snow
- Sources: GCM, USAP Air Operations Manual, DoD FLIP

Phoenix Airfield (ICAO: NZFX) is an airstrip in Antarctica opened in early 2017, designed to replace the Pegasus Field's role in serving McMurdo Station.

In last few years of Pegasus Field's operation, it had been plagued with warmer temperatures combined with dust and dirt blown in from nearby Black Island, causing excessive melting making the runway unusable at the end of the summer season. Accordingly, Pegasus, and the Ice Runway (which has not been consistently used in recent years), were planned to be replaced with a new "Alpha Runway" near Williams Field, constructed using compressed snow technology. A search for a replacement site began in 2014; serious construction began during the 2015-16 summer. The new runway is about 3 miles northwest of Pegasus, to be out of the wind patterns of the Black Island dust. It is based completely on compacted snow, rather than the "blue ice" base under Pegasus. With the new design and construction technique, its runway is designed to withstand approximately 60 wheeled flights a year.

On 7 April 2016, the National Science Foundation officially announced that the new runway would be named Phoenix Airfield after the name of a propeller-driven C-121 Constellation transport plane that was flown between Christchurch and McMurdo by the U.S. Navy VX-6 squadron from the 1960s through to 1971.

Phoenix Airfield underwent operational testing and received its first wheeled landings during the 2016-17 austral summer season.

Pegasus Airfield closed after the last flight on 8 December 2016. Phoenix Airfield was opened in early 2017.

C-17s were planned to use the runway throughout the 2017–18 field season, but NSF issued a notice on July 31, 2017 stating that "Conditions at the new Phoenix compacted-snow runway prevent the use of wheeled aircraft during the warm part of the austral summer.". In subsequent years a closure period of around six weeks for the main runway for wheeled aircraft has been the norm for summer operations, comprising the second half of December and all of January; during these times only ski equipped planes can take off or land at McMurdo.

TLS, TACAN, and RNAV instrument approaches are available. A microwave landing system used to be available but is decommissioned as of 2023.

== Gallery ==
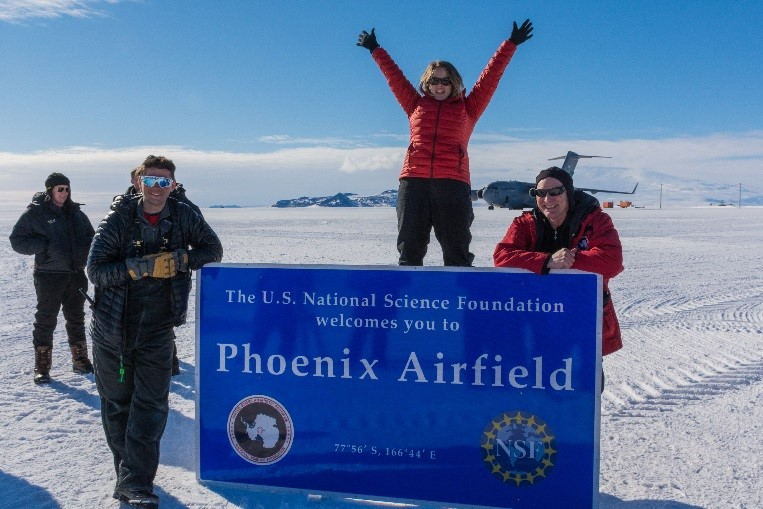
A group of engineers involved in the airfield's construction celebrates the airfield's completion, 2017

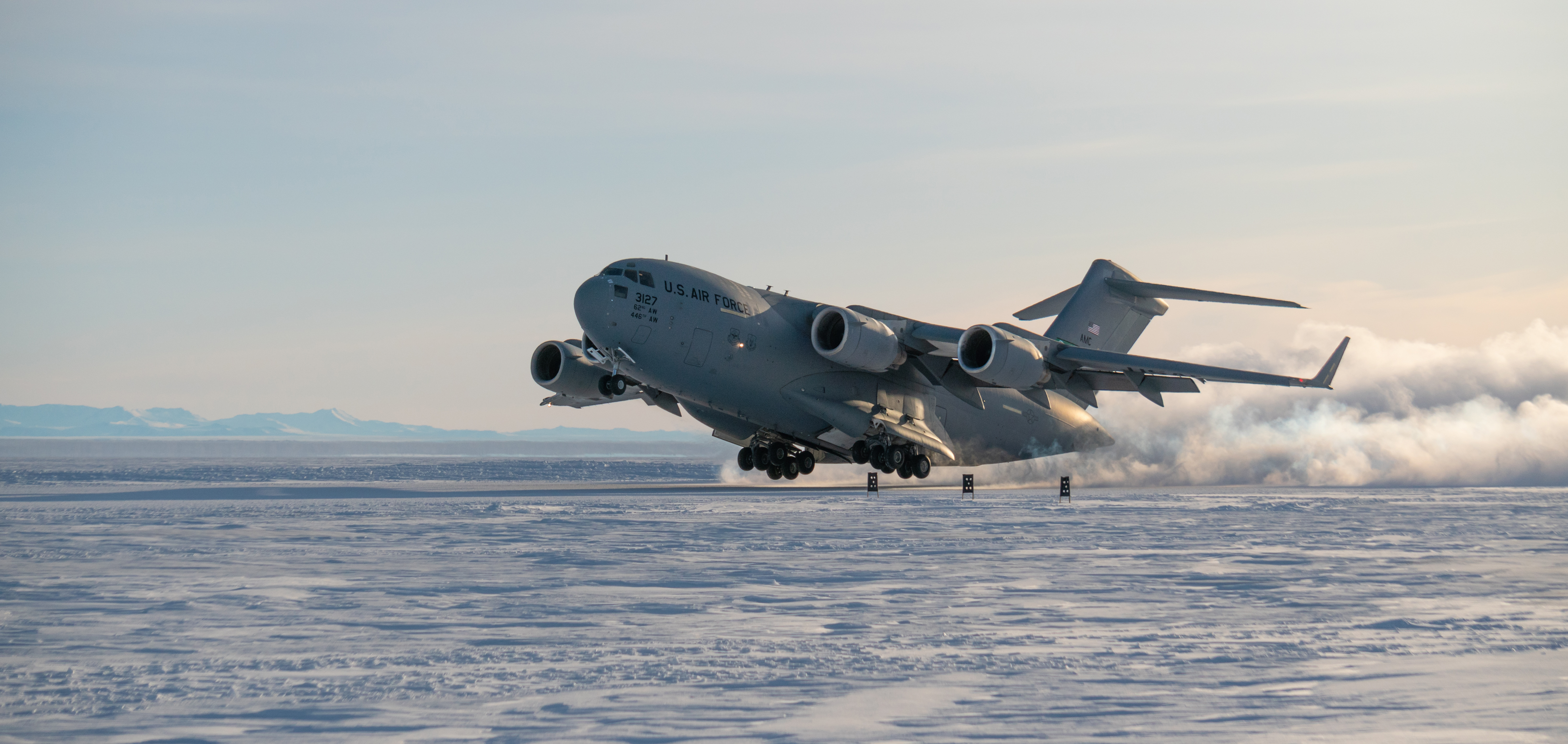
C-17 takes off from Phoenix Airfield, 2020

== See also ==
- List of airports in Antarctica
