= Observation Hill (McMurdo Station) =

Landform in Antarctica

Coordinates: 77.85°S 166.69°E

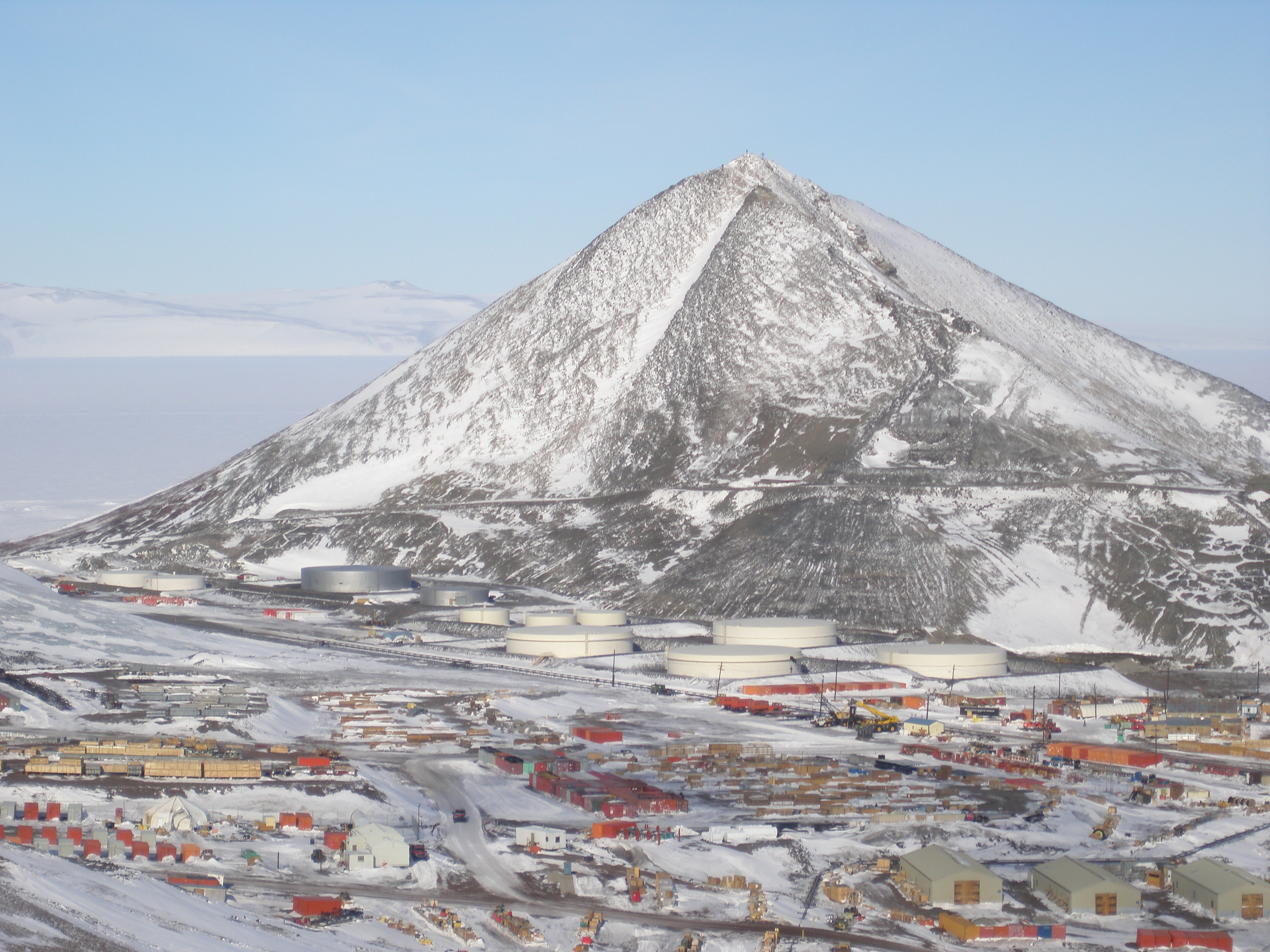
Observation Hill

Observation Hill is a steep 754-foot (230 m) hill adjacent to McMurdo Station in Antarctica and commonly called "Ob Hill". It is frequently climbed to get good viewing points across the continent. Regular clear skies give excellent visibility. A memorial at the top of the hill, erected in 1913, is an Antarctica Treaty historical site number HSM-20.

Observation Hill is a lava dome and one of many volcanoes comprising the Hut Point Peninsula.

== Observation Hill Cross ==
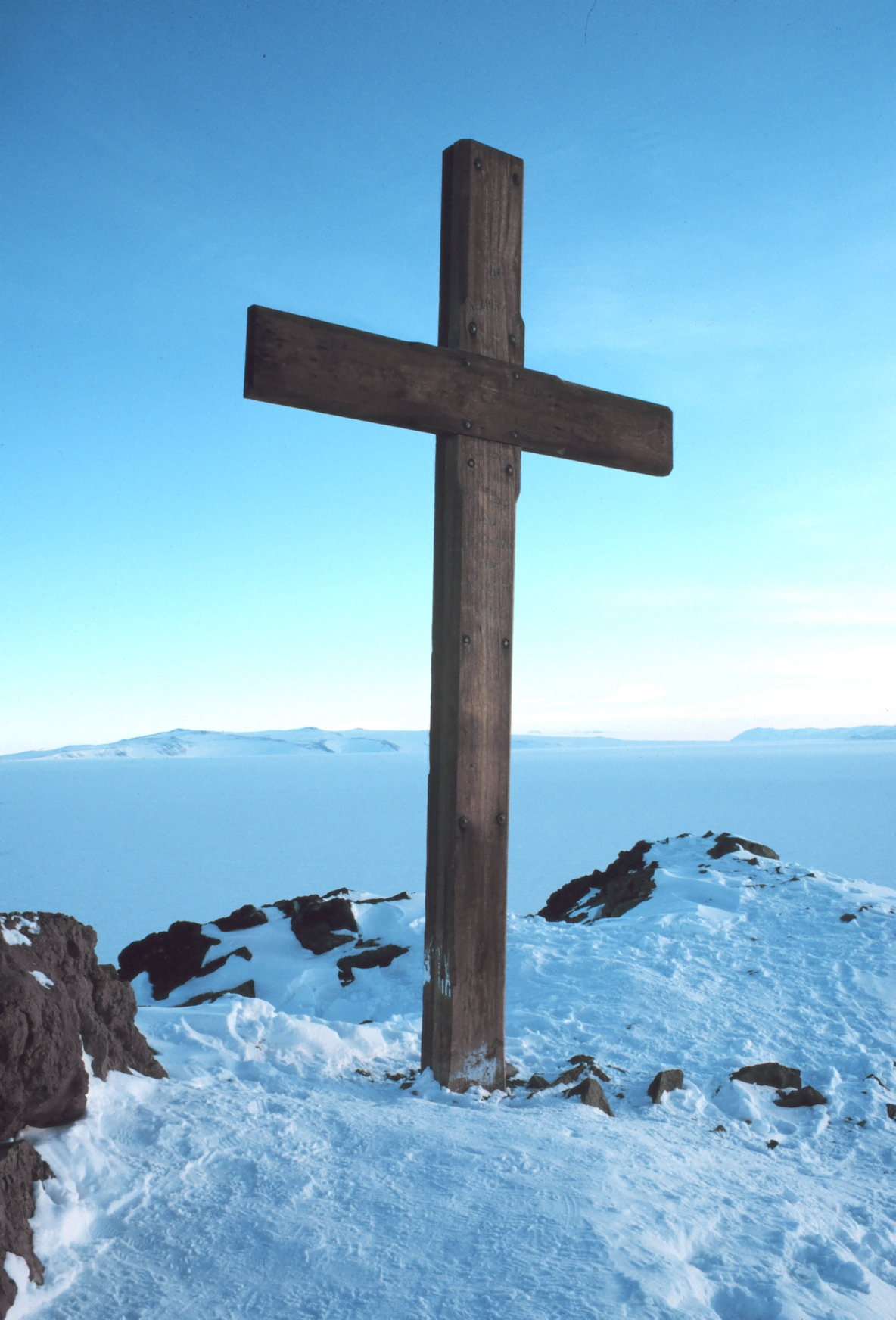
Terra Nova Expedition carpenter Francis Davies built the nine-foot memorial cross on Observation Hill, erected in January 1913 in memory of the five members of Robert Falcon Scott's party who perished on the return journey from the South Pole.

After their deaths in early 1912, the last members of Robert Falcon Scott's party were found by a search party led by the surgeon Edward L. Atkinson. The relief party took their photographic film, scientific specimens, and other materials. The bodies of Scott and his men were left in their tent, and later parties could not locate the campsite, since that area had been covered in snow. A century of storms and snow have covered the cairn and tent, which are now encased in the Ross Ice Shelf as it slowly inches towards the Ross Sea. In 2001, glaciologist Charles R. Bentley estimated that the tent with the bodies was under about 75 feet (23 m) of ice and about 30 miles (48 km) from the point where they died; he speculated that in about 275 years the bodies would reach the Ross Sea, and perhaps float away inside an iceberg.

The search party returned to their base camp in McMurdo Sound to await the relief ship. After it arrived, they worked to build a memorial – a nine-foot wooden cross, inscribed with the names of the fatal party and the final line of the Alfred Tennyson poem "Ulysses", which reads "To strive, to seek, to find, and not to yield." On 22 January 1913, after a difficult two-day sledge journey, the cross was erected on the summit of Observation Hill, overlooking the camp and facing out towards the "Barrier" – the Ross Ice Shelf, on which Scott's party had died. In 1972, the cross was declared as one of the initial Historic Sites and Monuments in Antarctica by the Antarctic Treaty signatories, as HSM-20.

== Gallery ==
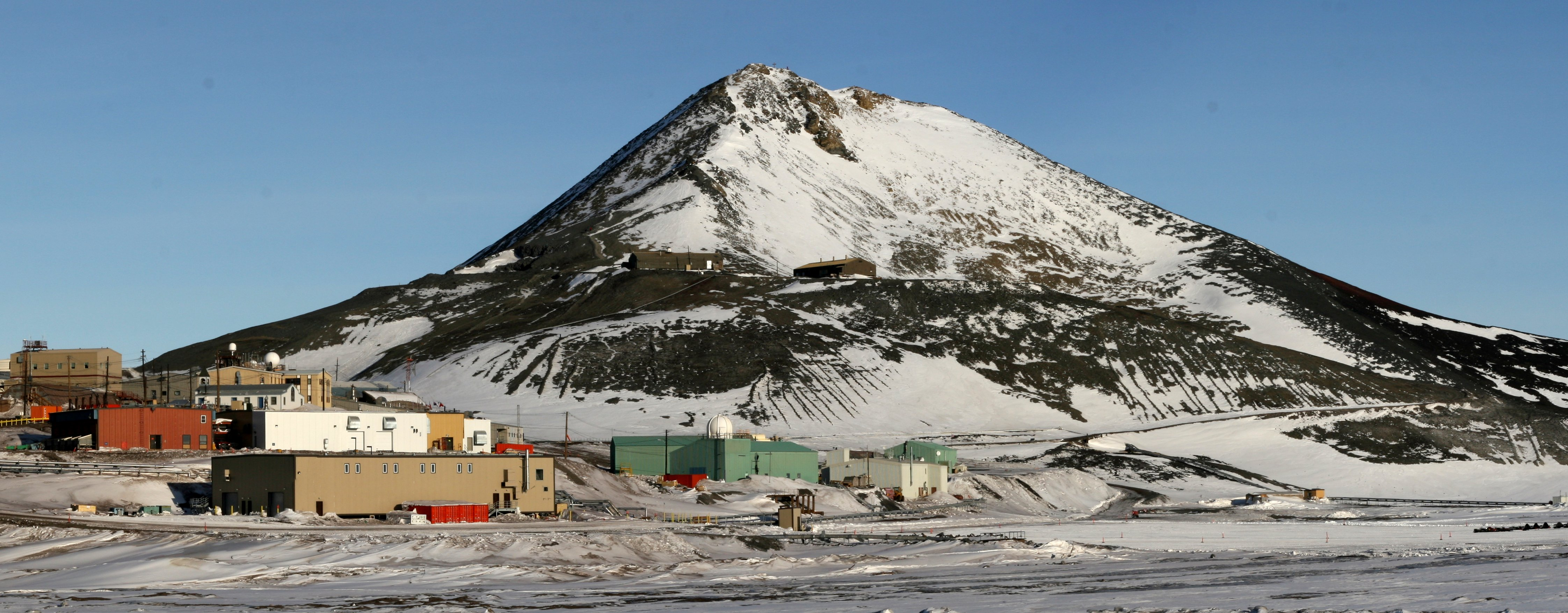
Observation Hill as seen from Hut Point

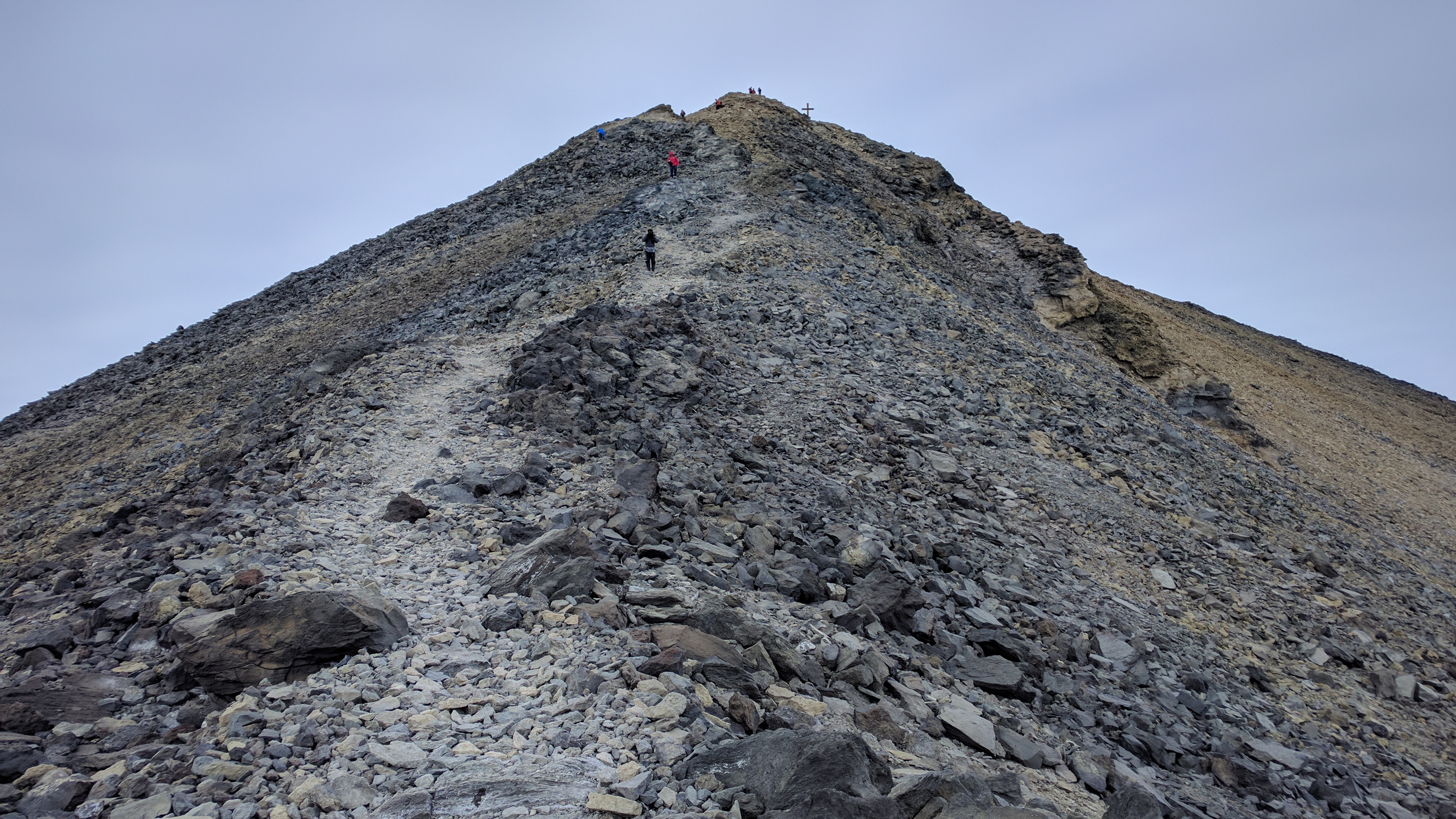
Trail to the top of Observation Hill (February 2017)

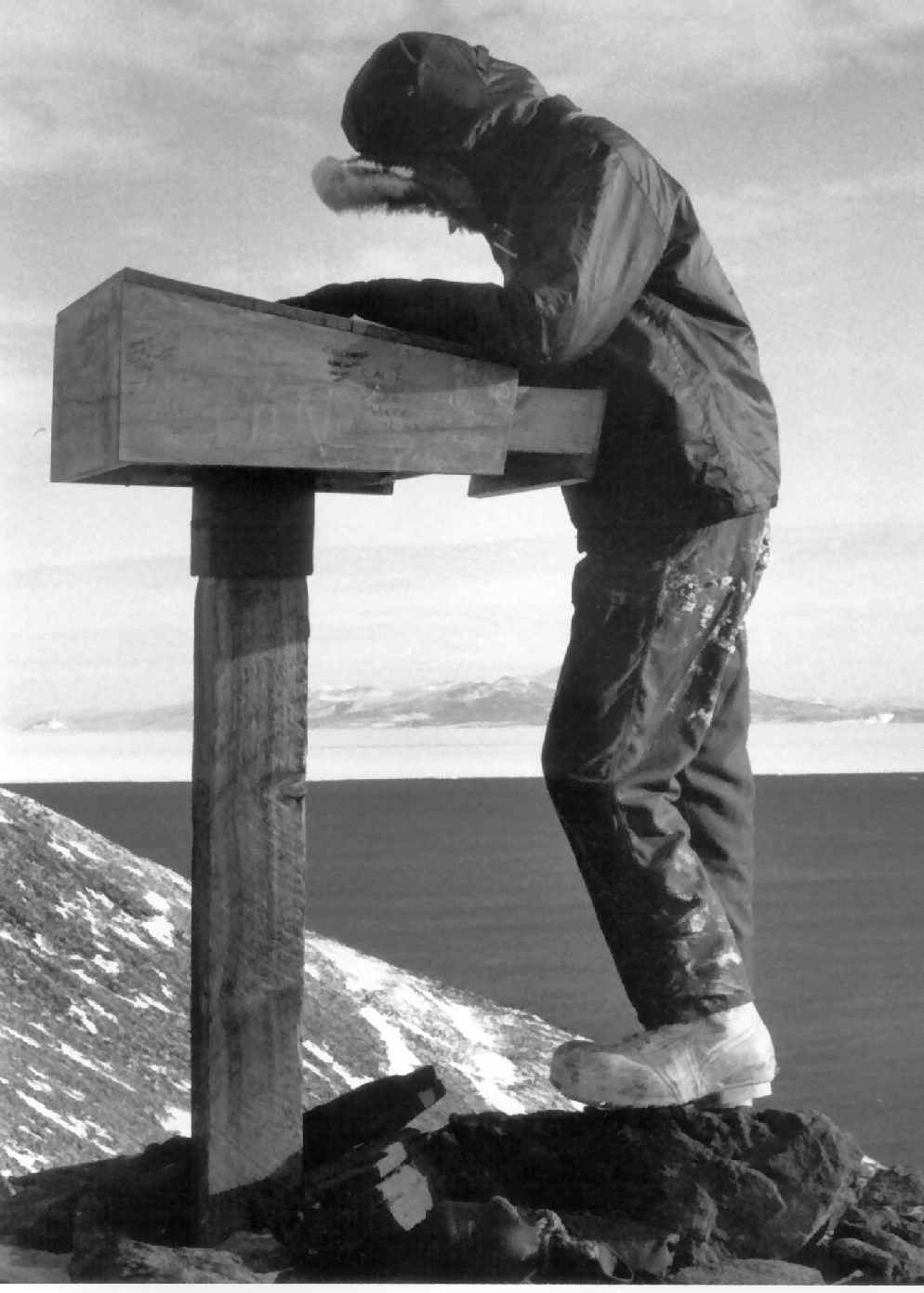
Mariner from the USNS Southern Cross signs the summit registry

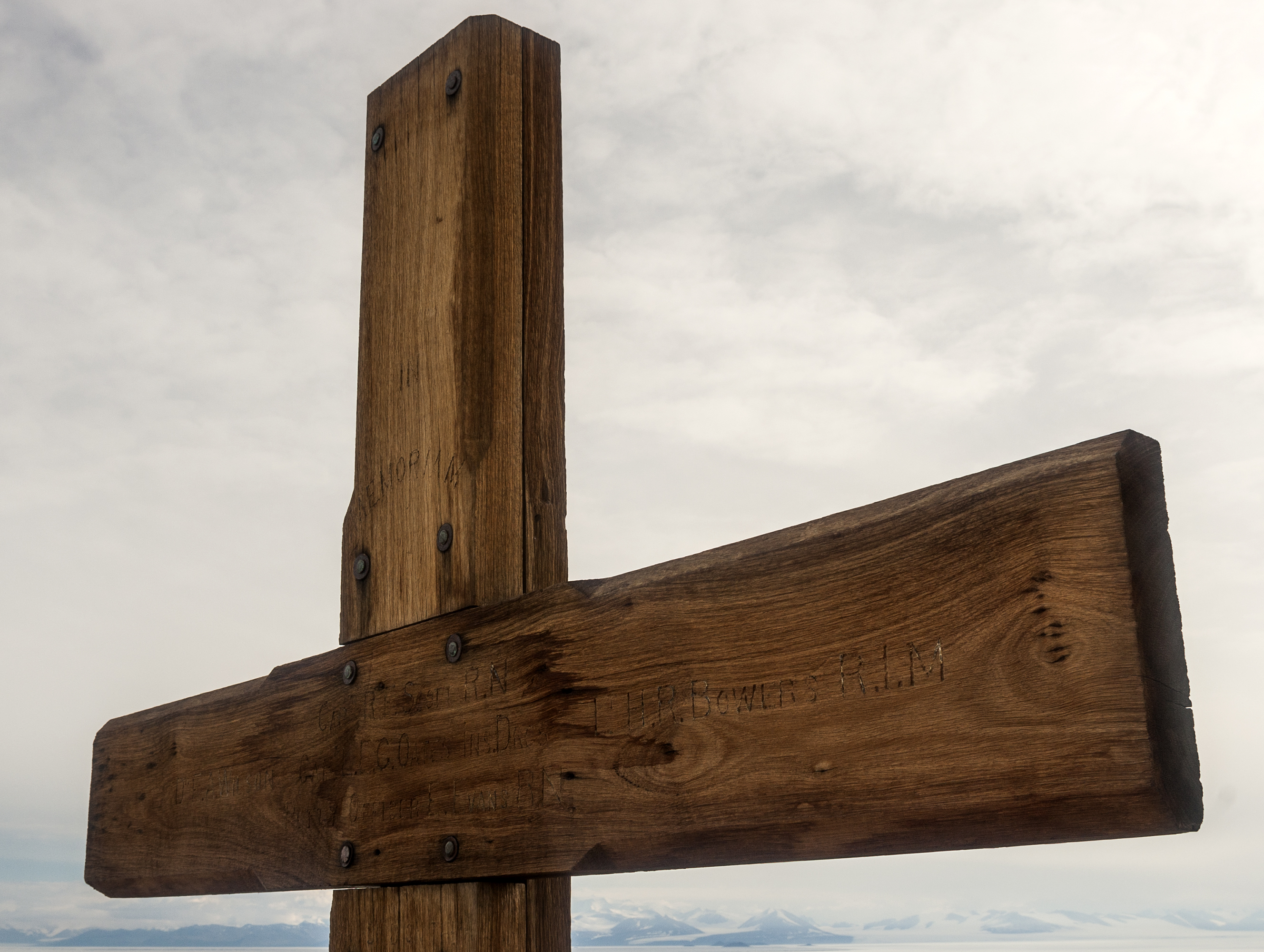
Detail of the Observation Hill Cross

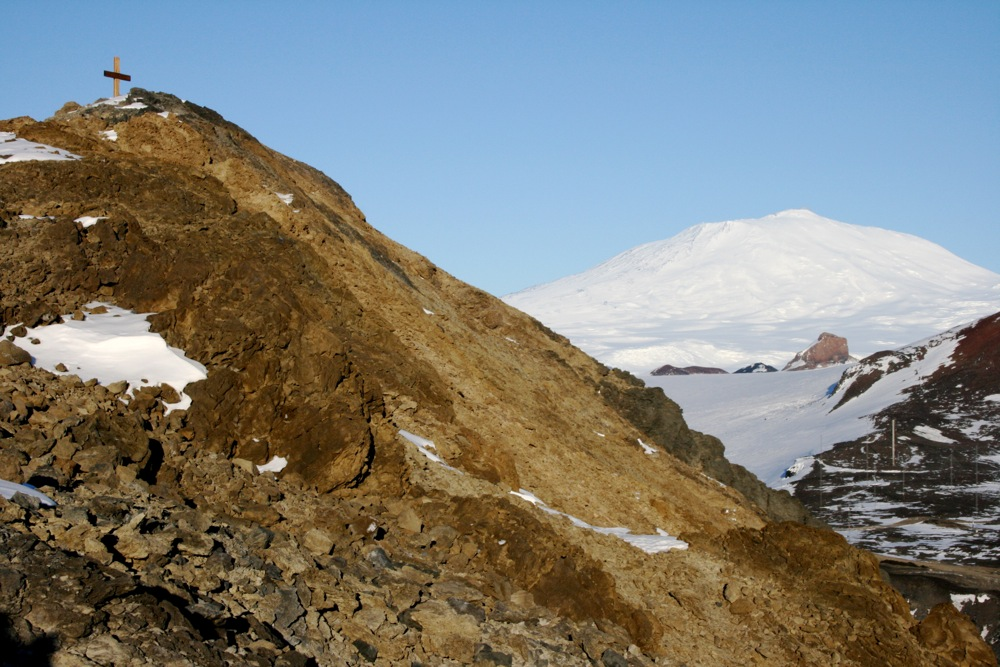
View of Mount Erebus (cross at upper left)

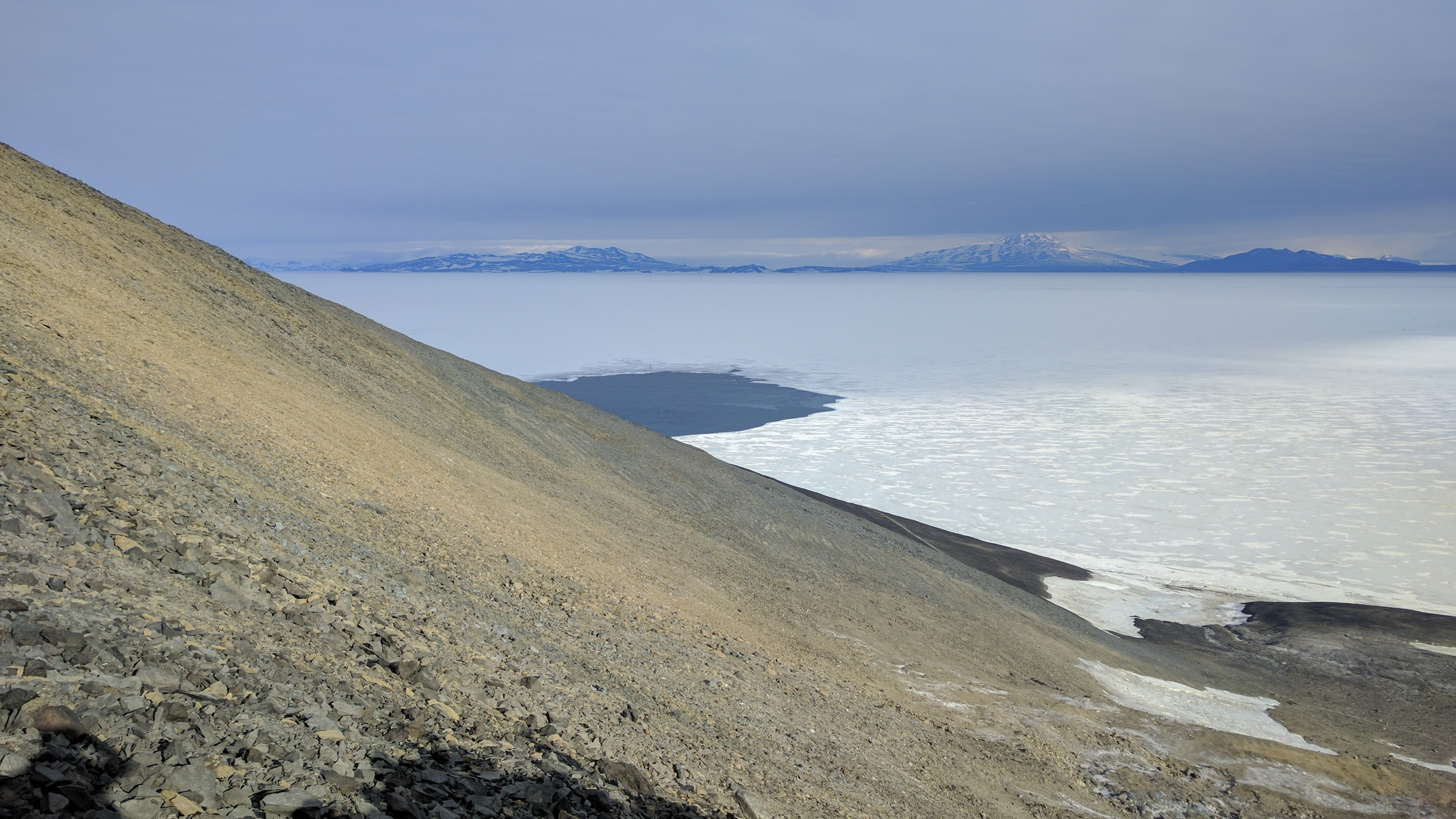
View across McMurdo ice sheet

== See also ==
- McMurdo Station
- Winter Quarters Bay
- McMurdo Station transportation
