= Marble Point =

- Antarctic base
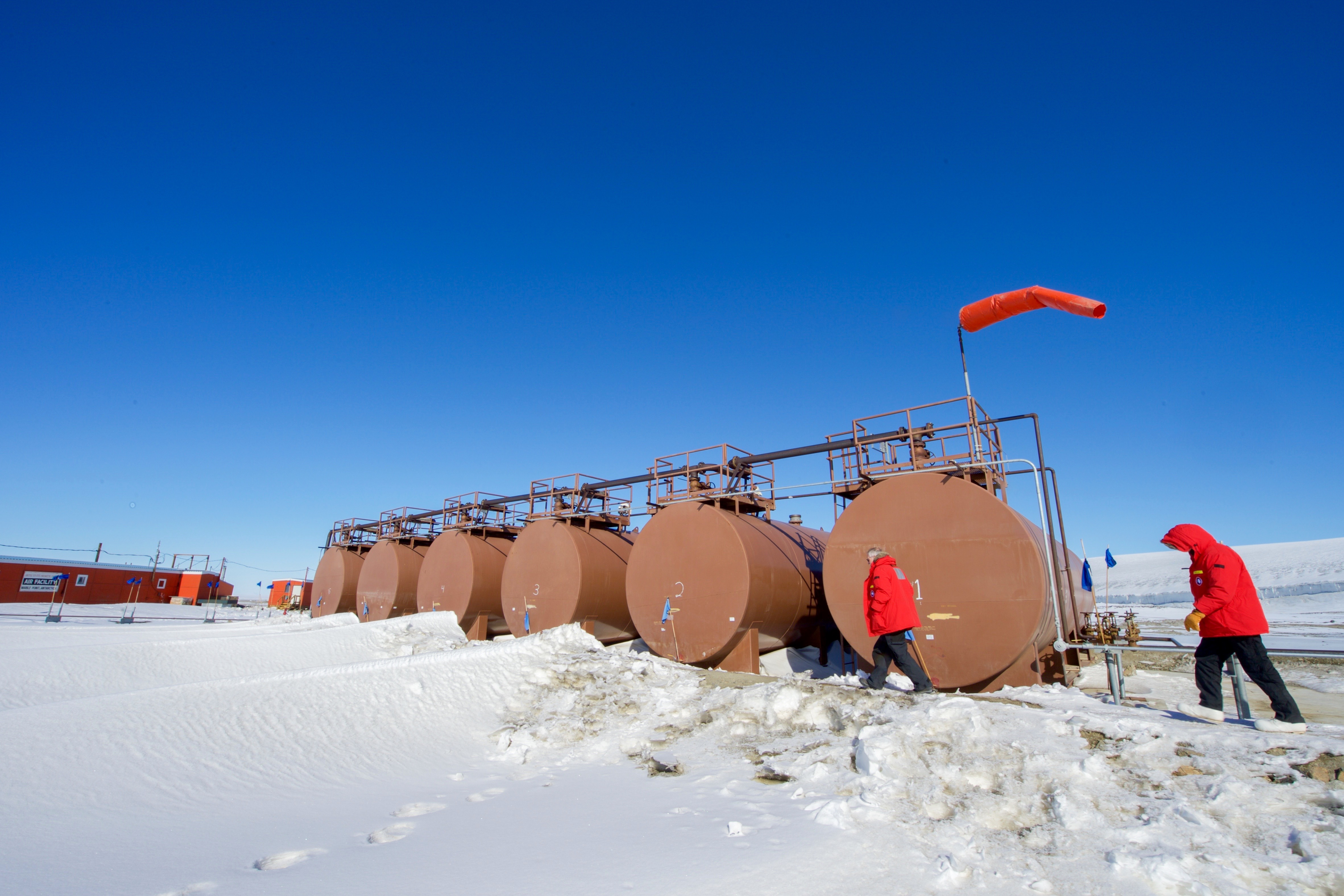
- Fuel depots and refuge at Marble Point

- Location of Marble Point Station in Antarctica
- Coordinates: 77°26′00″S 163°50′00″E
- Country: United States
- Location in Antarctica: Marble Point; Antarctica
- Administered by: United States Antarctic Program
- Established: 1956

Population
  - Total: Up to 17
- Type: Seasonal
- Period: Summer
- Status: Operational

Marble Point Heliport
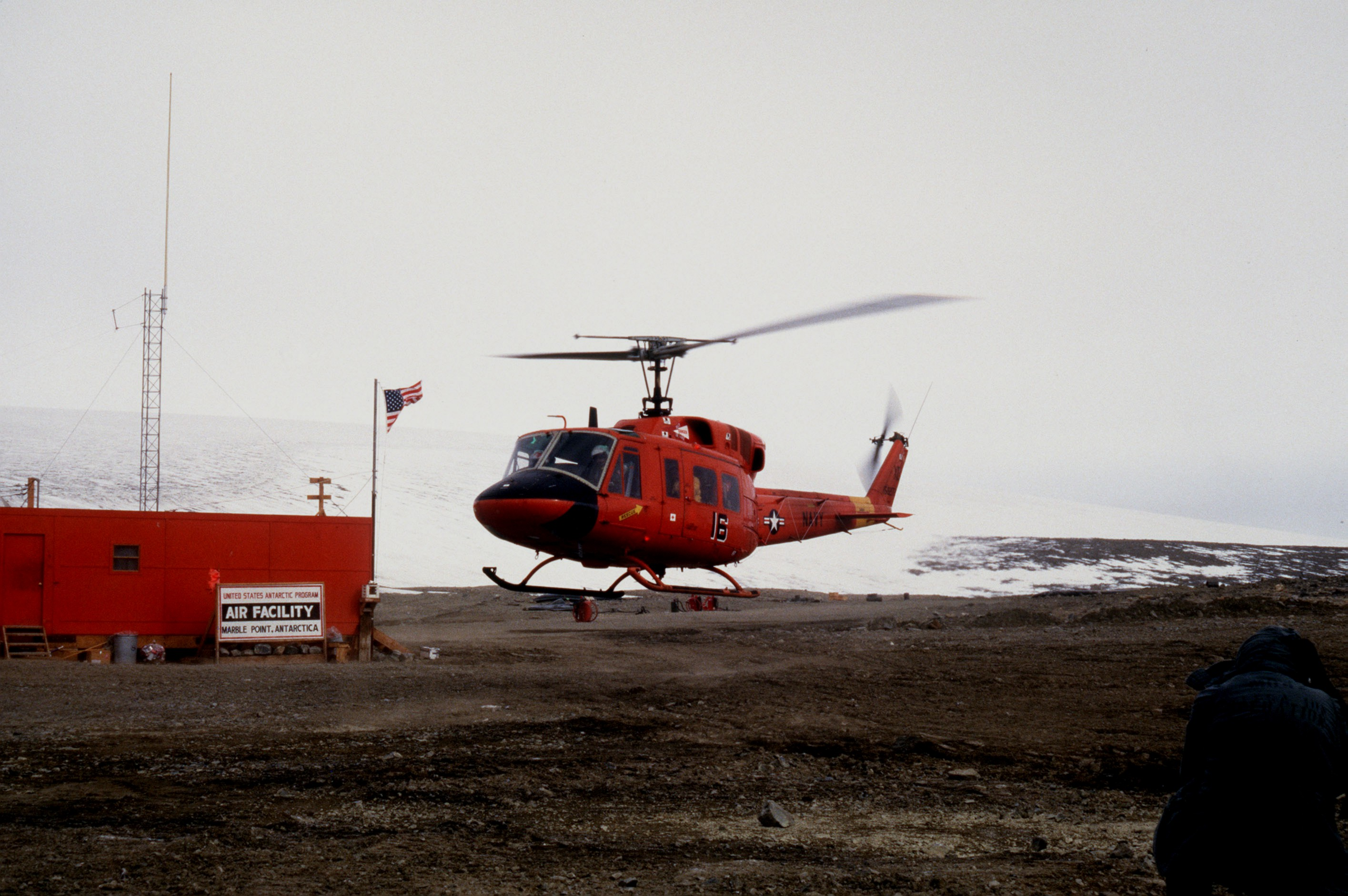
- A U.S. Navy UH-1N at Marble Point, 15 June 1988
- IATA: none; ICAO: GC0079

Summary
- Airport type: Private
- Location: Marble Point; Victoria Land
- Coordinates: 77°24′47″S 163°40′44″E

Map
- Location of airfield in Antarctica

Runways
| Direction | Length | | Surface |
| Direction | ft | m | Surface |
|---|---|---|---|
| | | | Gravel |

Marble Point is a rocky promontory on the coast of Victoria Land, Antarctica. The United States operates a station at the point. The outpost is used as a helicopter refueling station supporting scientific research in the nearby continental interior, such as the McMurdo Dry Valleys. Dependent upon the weather conditions at the time, helicopters are able to fly in and out of the station 24 hours a day during the summer research season. It supports operations at nearby McMurdo (US) and Scott (NZ) facilities on Ross Island, and was established in the mid-1950s, like those installations.

The station's remote location and adjoining frozen sea have largely discouraged tourism in the area. However, the Russian icebreaker Kapitan Khlebnikov conducts cruises in the Ross Sea and McMurdo Sound. In 1993, the icebreaker docked at fast ice offshore Marble Point. Tourists aboard helicopters launched from the icebreaker flew excursions into the McMurdo Dry Valleys.

== History ==
The way station at Marble Point is located on a narrow strip of land between Wilson Piedmont Glacier and the sea, about 50 mi (80 km) from McMurdo Station. United States military forces built the camp on the western shores of McMurdo Sound in 1956 in conjunction with the forthcoming 1957–58 International Geophysical Year (IGY).

Preparation for IGY included constructing a hard-surface air strip at Marble Point. A VX-6 Otter airplane made Antarctica’s first wheels-on-dirt landing at Marble Point in 1957. Aboard were U.S. Navy Admiral Dufeck and New Zealand explorer Sir Edmund Hillary. A de Havilland Canada DHC-3 Otter aircraft crashed on take off at Marble Point, on January 4, 1959, taking the lives of two men. The plane was part of Operation Deep Freeze IV.

Contemporary Marble Point is staffed during the austral summer by a station manager, cook, and a "fuelie," a person who fuels helicopters (typically AStar and Bell 212's contracted by the United States Antarctic Program and Antarctica New Zealand, owned and operated by Petroleum Helicopters International). Hot meals and minimal overnight accommodations for 14 are available for pilots and personnel traveling to and from inland research operations.

Personnel rely upon melted snow for potable water. A bulldozer is used to scoop snow from nearby Wilson Piedmont Glacier. The snow is dumped into a hopper for melting and subsequent filtration. Other facilities at the station include an automated weather station.

United States Antarctic Program workers conducted a concerted cleanup at the station during the 1989–1990 and 1990–1991 summer research seasons. Fuel spills are known to have occurred in the area. As late as 2001, spills more than 40 years old were still visible. Contemporary operations include the collection of human waste at the station, which is transported to McMurdo Station.

== Re-supply ==
Each austral summer, a United States Coast Guard icebreaker busts a ship channel to Marble Point in order to deliver helicopter fuel. The ship usually can reach within about 1/4 mi (0.40 km) from the beach. Fuel is then pumped ashore. Formerly, personnel pumped the aviation fuel into 20,000 gallon bladders for storage. However, the fuel bladders were replaced with steel tanks. Contaminated soil is present at Marble Point from fuel spills which occurred between 1957 and 1963.

Support personnel re-supply the camp annually via a convoy of over-the-ice vehicles from McMurdo Station. Drivers maneuver 15-ton Delta cargo vehicles equipped with large balloon-type tires over a more than 50-mile ice road. Alternatively, vehicles towing snow sleds are used to transport cargo. Drivers also deliver food, construction equipment, and scientific equipment that is staged at Marble Point for subsequent airlift to field camps.

Flags placed approximately every quarter mile mark much of the ice road to Marble Point. Drivers carry global positioning devices as navigational aids during the seven-hour journey. Waste materials (including human waste) from Marble Point and garbage dropped off from inland research stations are back-loaded to McMurdo Station for disposal. The supply season runs from mid-October to late November or early December.

== See also ==
- List of airports in Antarctica
- List of field camps
- South Stream
- Williams Field
- McMurdo Station transportation

== Gallery ==
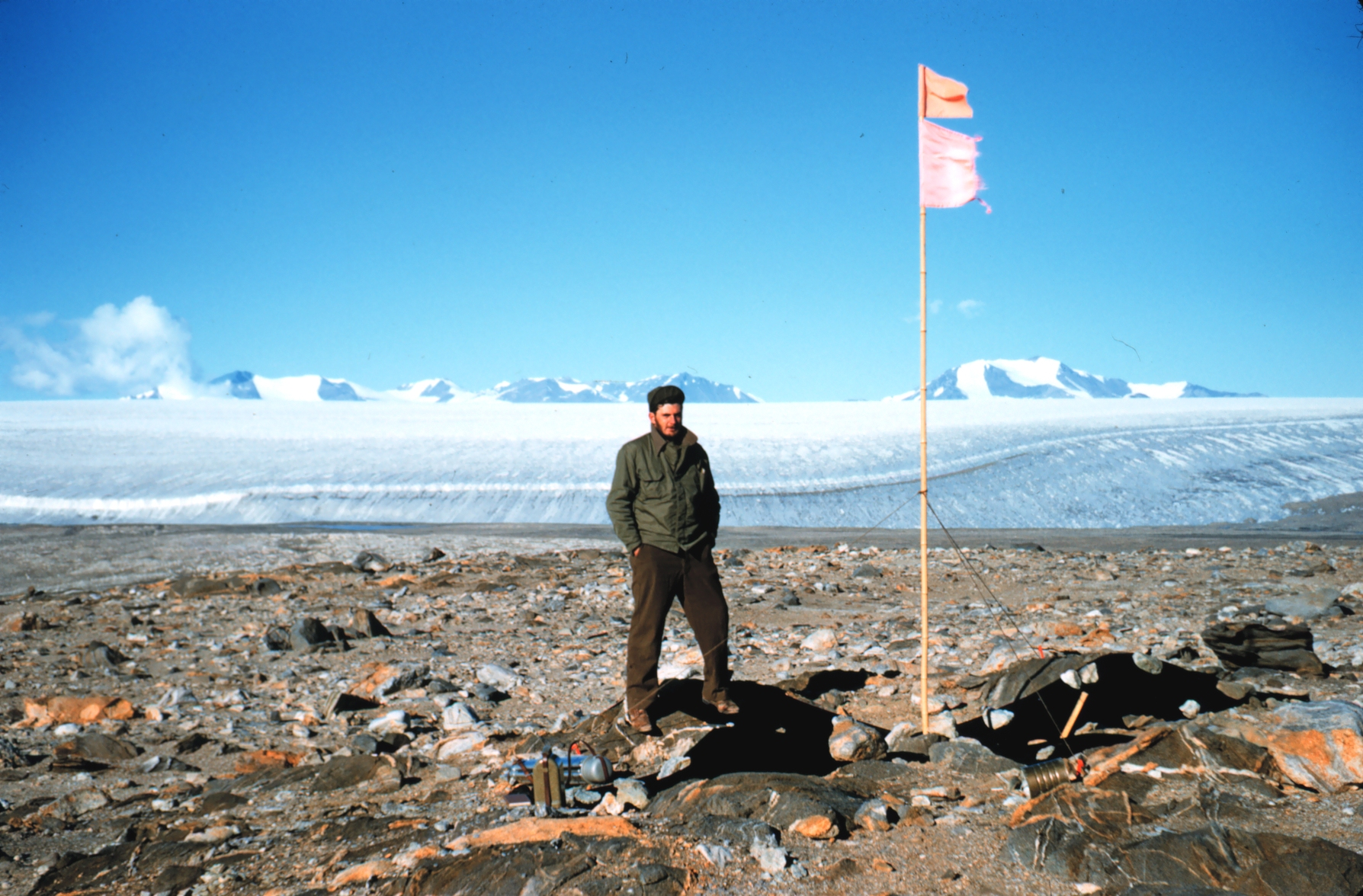
Marble Point's relatively flat terrain facilitated construction in 1957 of a now-defunct dirt airstrip

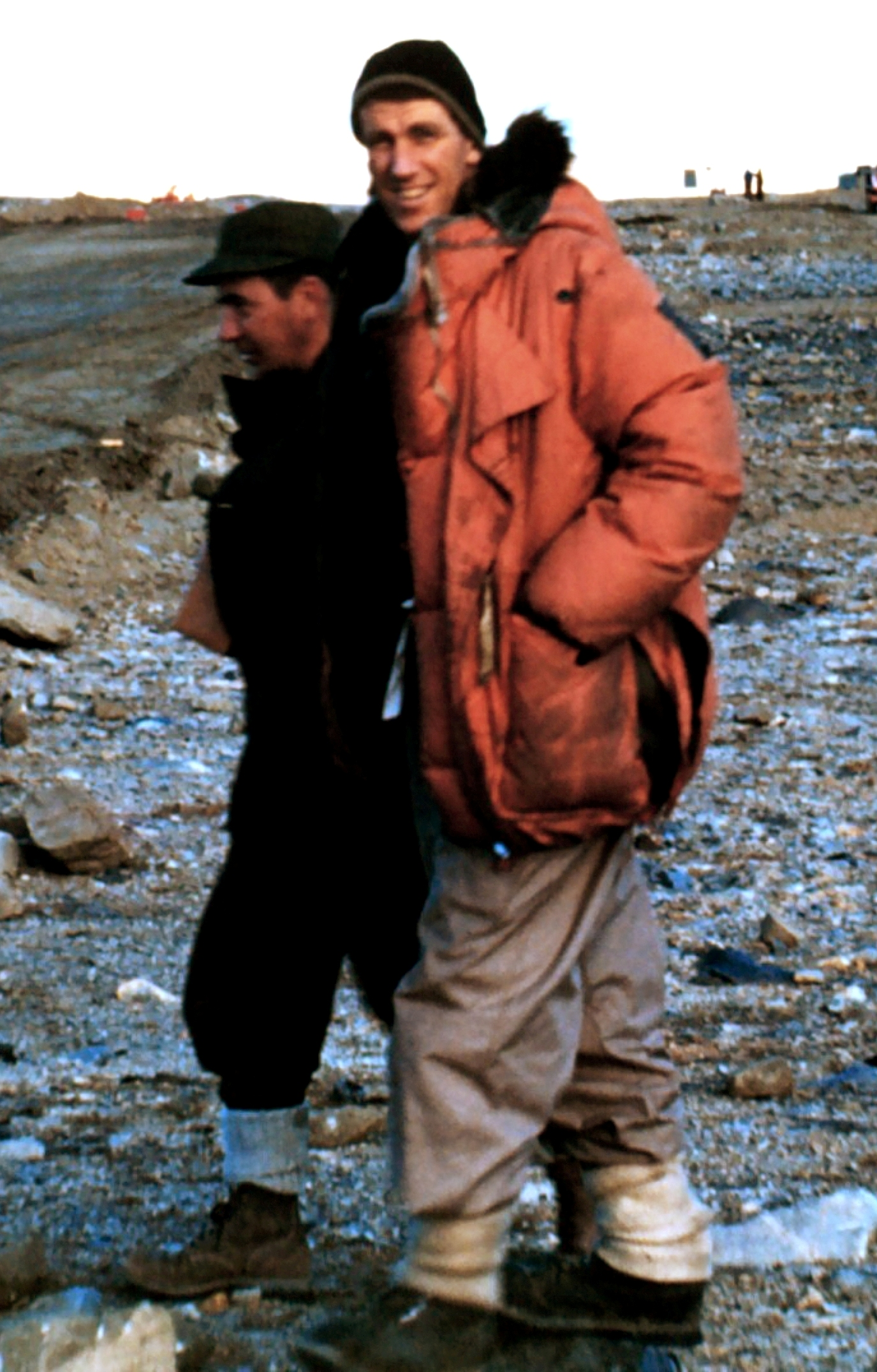
Edmund Hillary at Marble Point, 1957

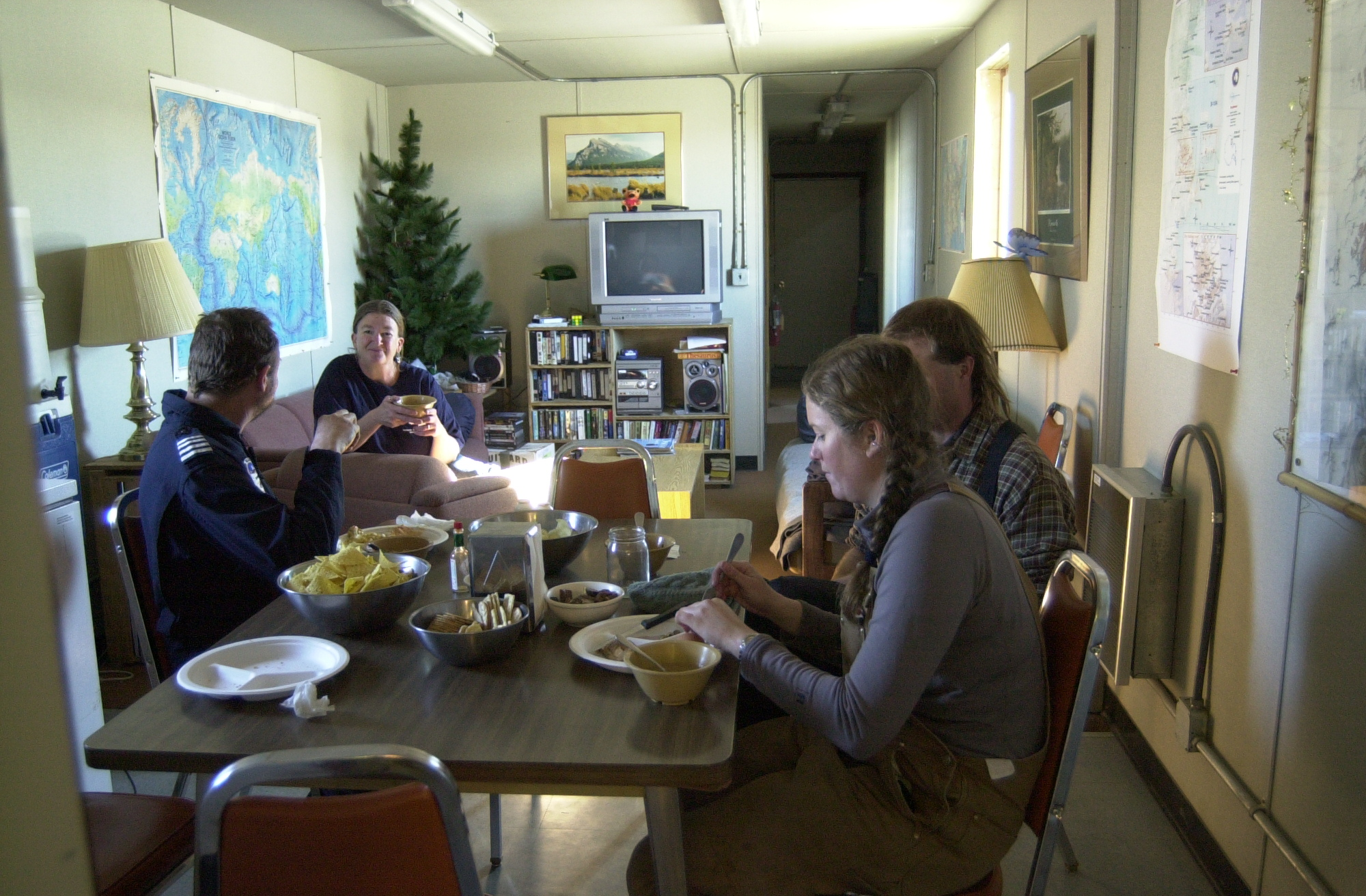
Flight crews and field scientists stock up on fuel and hot food at Marble Point (2004)

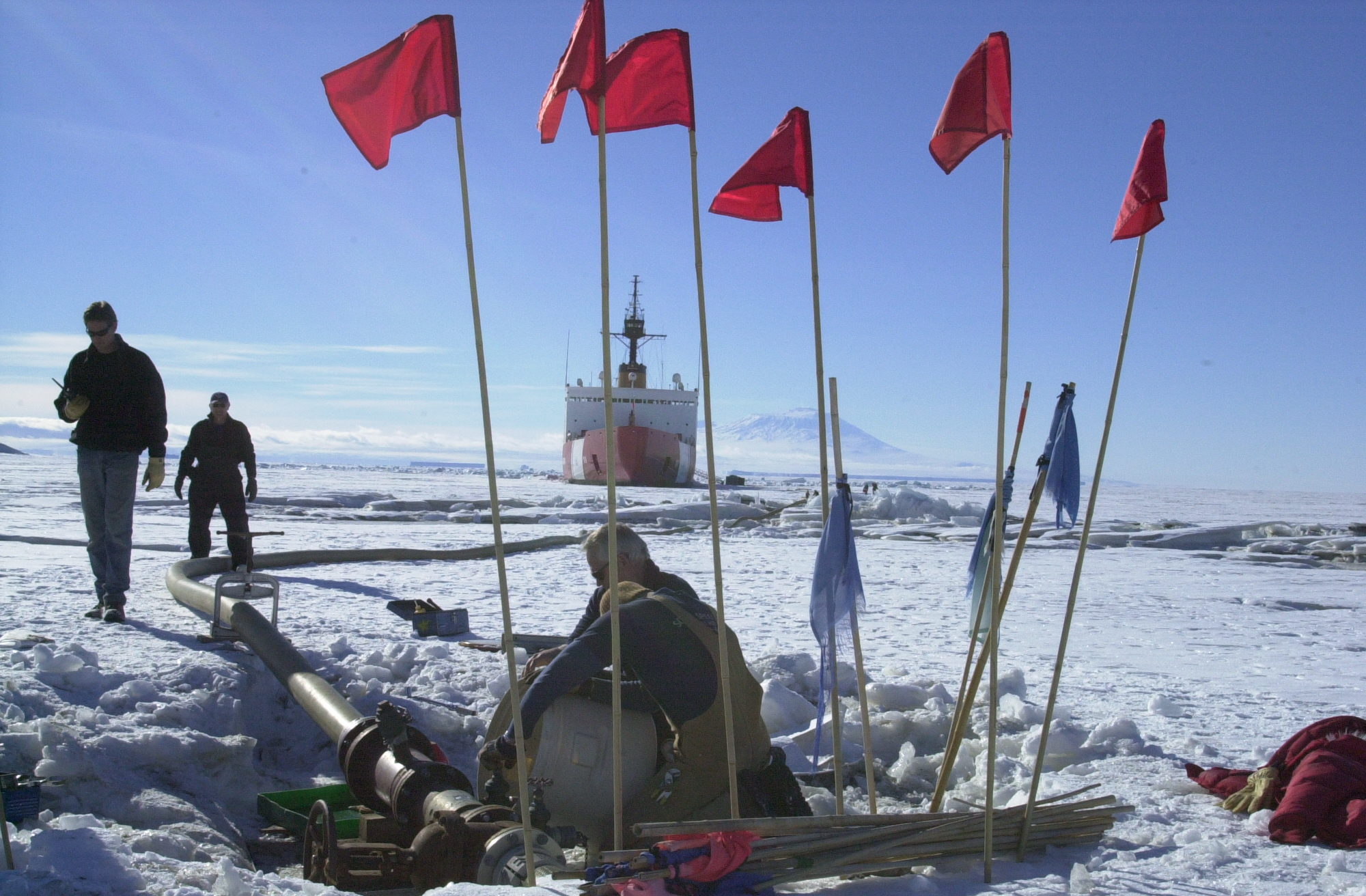
A United States Polar Class icebreaker offloading fuel at Marble Point
