= McMurdo Station transportation =

American Antarctic transportation system

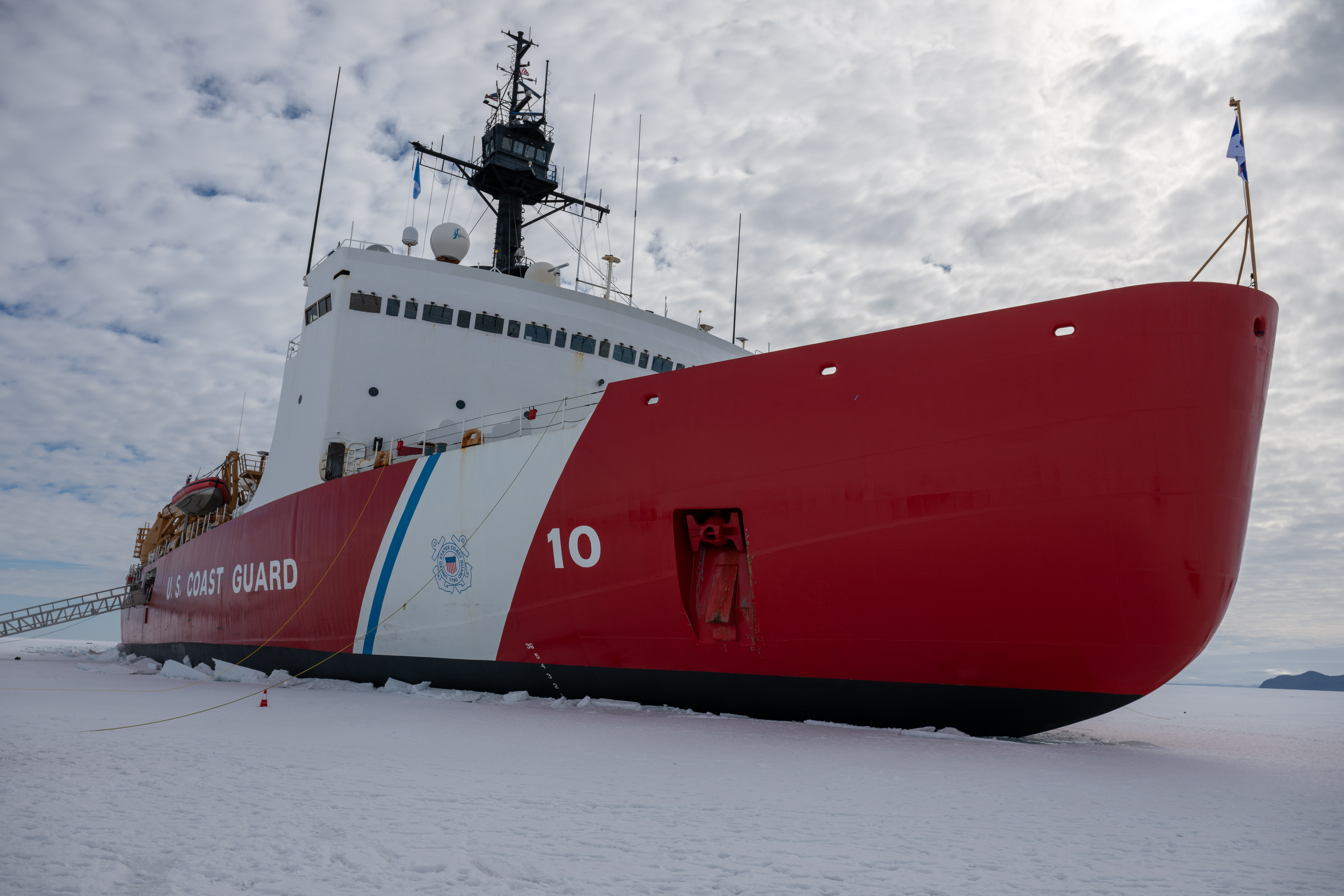
USCGC Polar Star in McMurdo Sound for Operation Deep Freeze. January 7, 2025

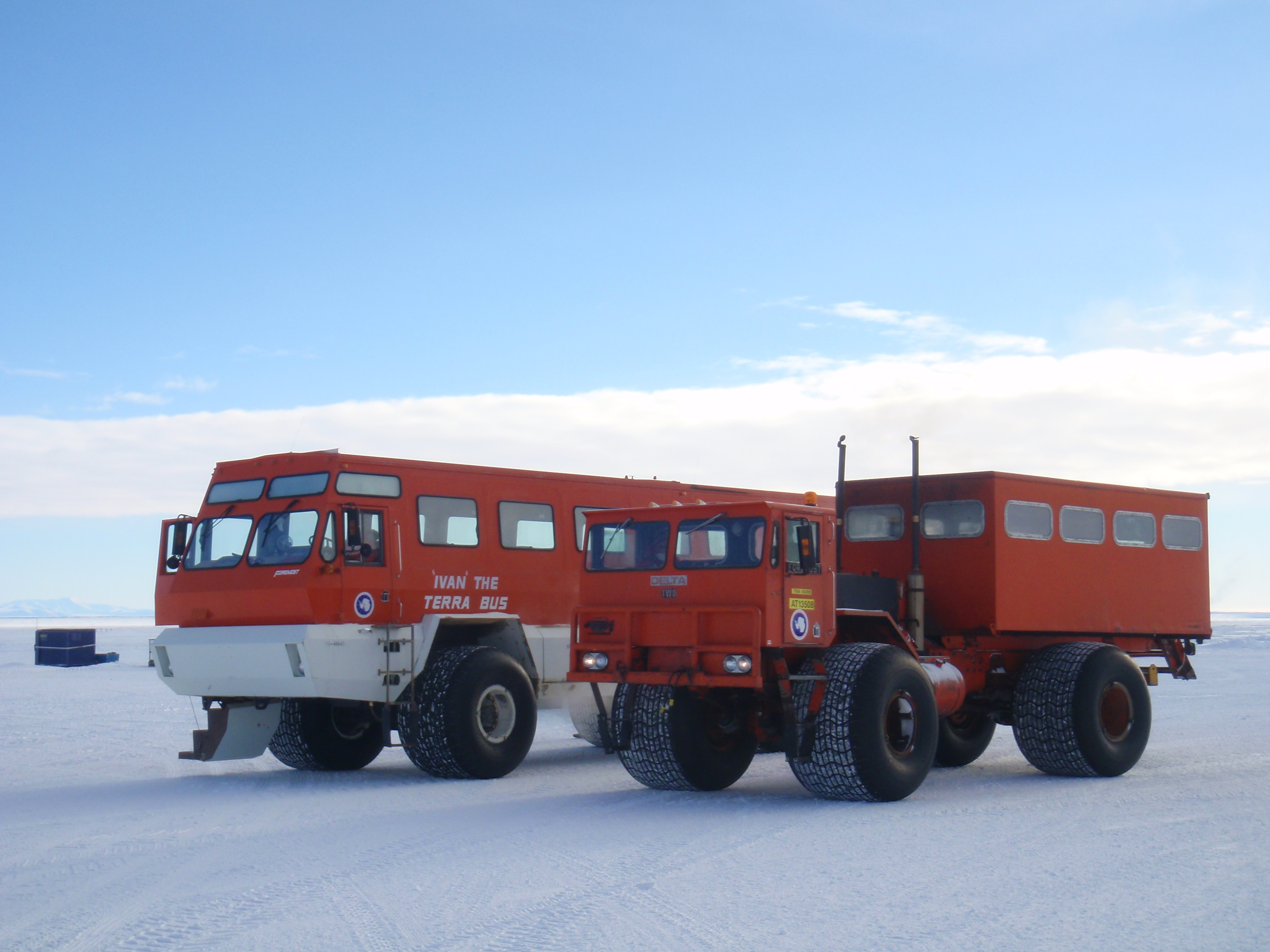
McMurdo's Foremost Terra Bus (used as a snow coach from 1994-2025) and the Foremost Delta II

McMurdo Station transportation involves many types of land (ground), sea, and air transportation. In addition, there are many types of transports specialized for cold weather and snow/ice conditions. McMurdo Station is a United States science and logistic base on Ross Island, Antarctica, at the southern end of Hut Point Peninsula, near New Zealand's Scott Base. The seasonal sea ice and polar light/dark cycle affect transport also. During the cold season there are trails and even airstrips on the ice of Ross Sound, which, when frozen over, limits access to the small harbor in Winter Quarters Bay. Transport must contend with extreme cold, snow and ice.

Ships may need an icebreaker to get to McMurdo Station, and ground transport may utilize snow tires, tracks, and sleds. Aircraft with skis may land on snow, such as the Lockheed LC-130, while more prepared ice or compacted snow runways, may tolerate conventional landing gear. Extremely cold temperatures and continuous darkness during the polar night can complicate operating aircraft. Weather conditions also affect the harbor, which ices over in winter and the whole McMurdo Sound is covered by sea ice. There is many types of vehicles to traverse different types of snow, ice, ground conditions and for different tasks. One of the most dangerous areas to traverse is the glacial ice, where snow can hide deep crevasses.

McMurdo Station has a heliport, which helps reach locations in the area, and there is a refueling station across McMurdo Sound to the west, on Marble Point.

Some of the aircraft that have traveled to McMurdo Station include ski-equipped LC-130, C-121 Super Constellation, C-124C Globemaster II, C-141 Starlifter, C-17 Globemaster III, C-5 Galaxy, and regular C-130 Hercules. Royal New Zealand Air Force (RNZAF) have also flown aircraft to the same airports including 757 and C-130.

== Ground ==
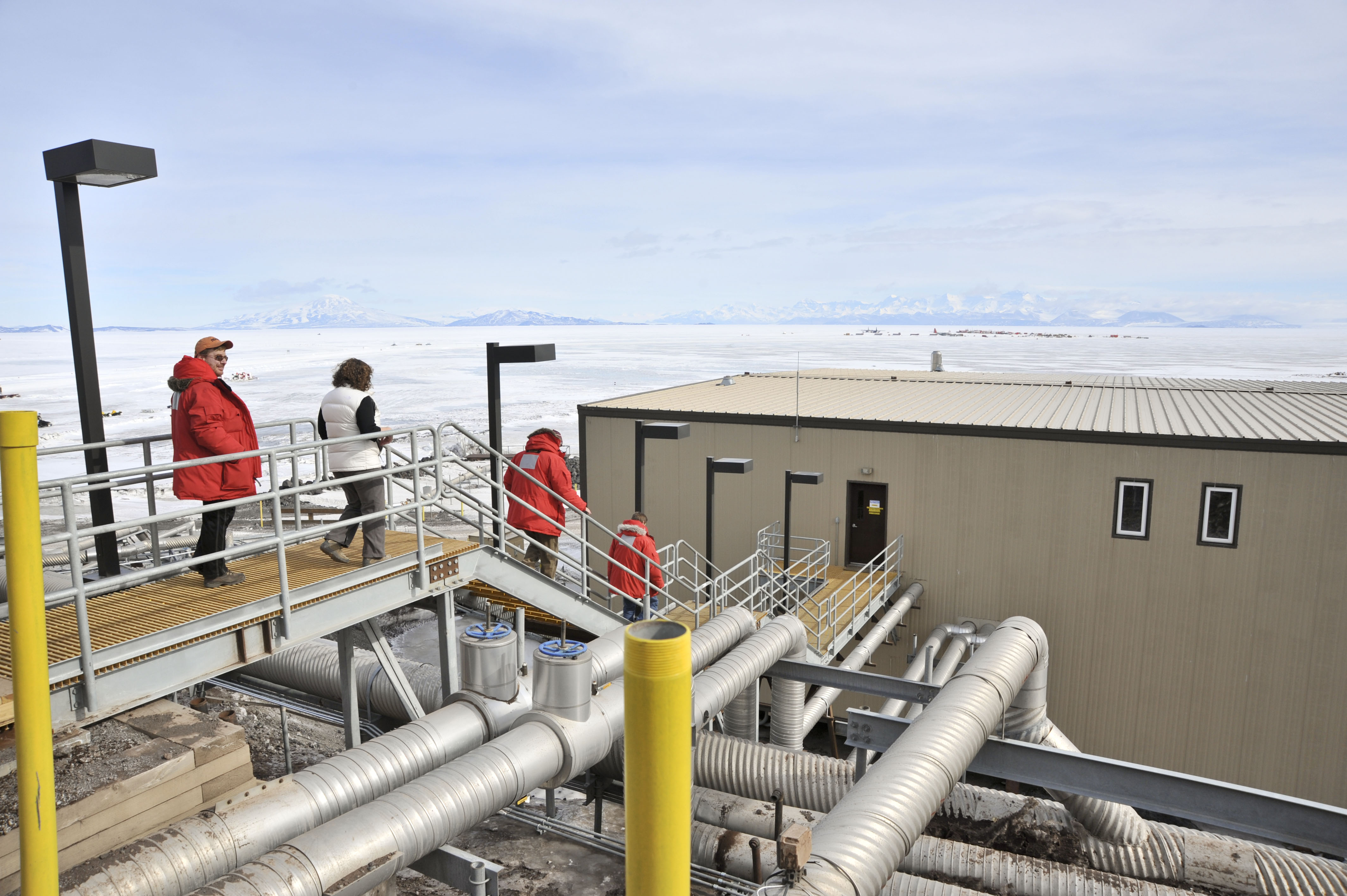
Walkway between buildings at McMurdo Station

A multitude of on- and off-road vehicles transport people and cargo around the station area.

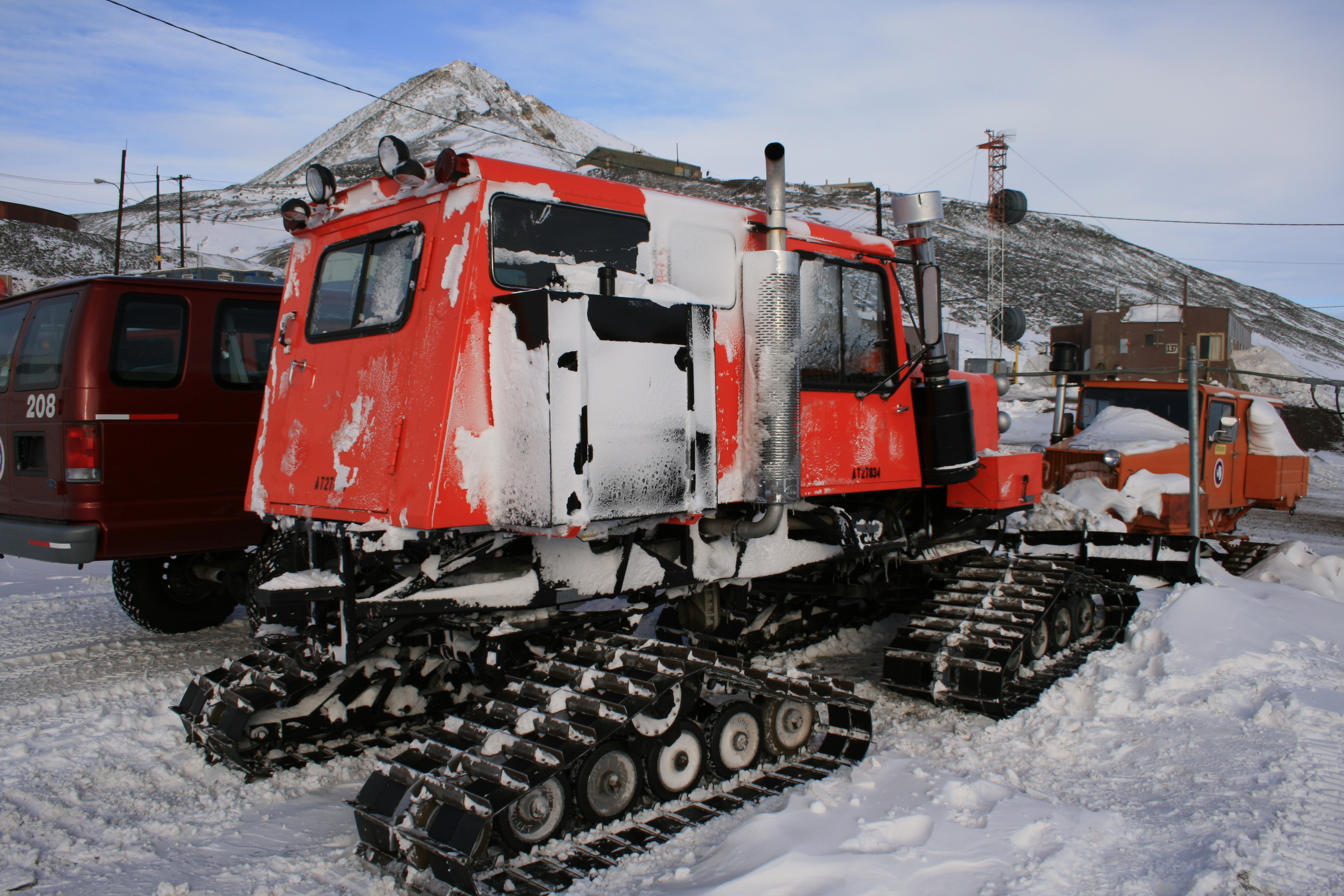
Modded E-Series and Tucker Sno-cat at McMurdo

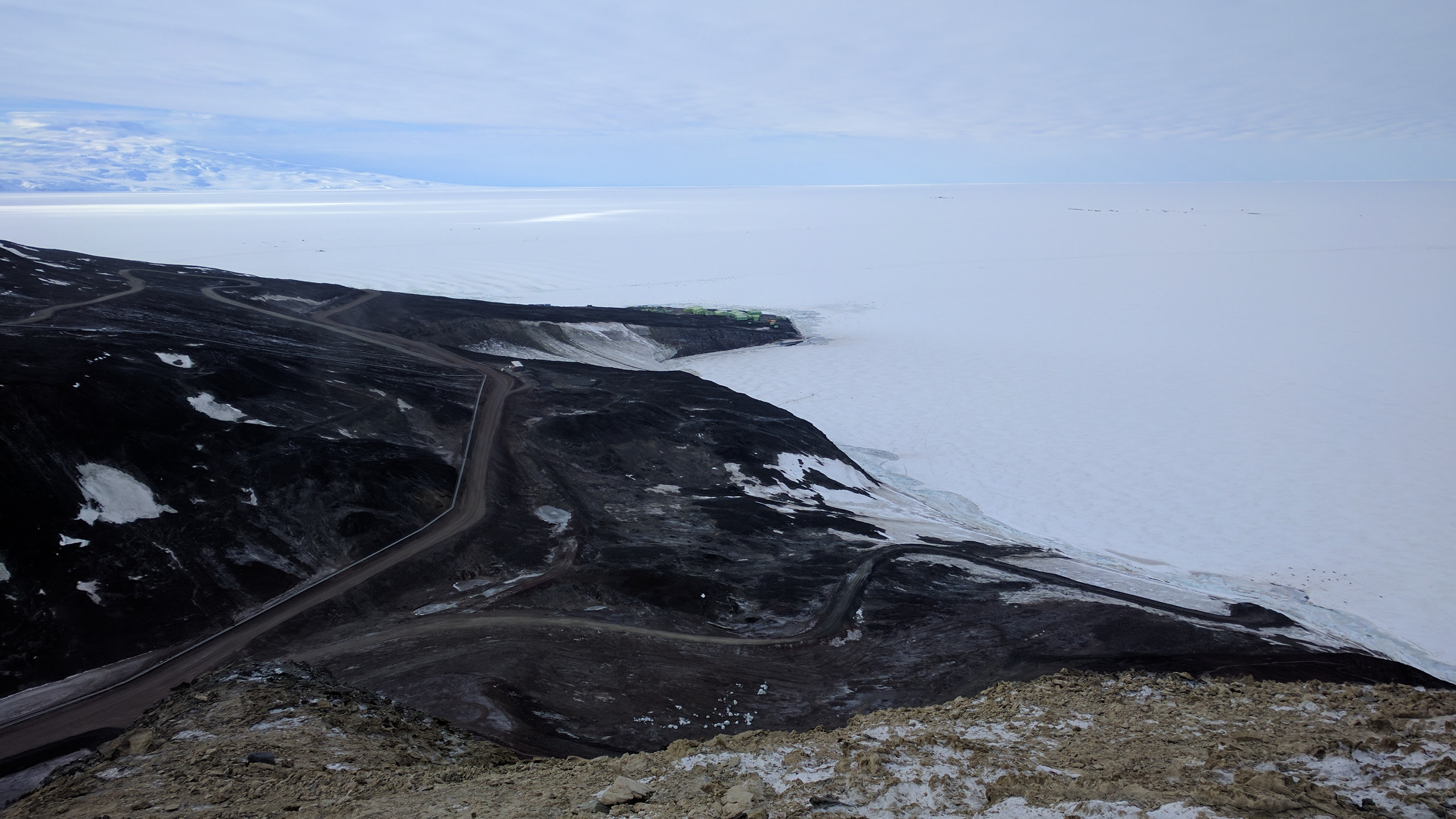
Road over to New Zealand's Scott base from McMurdo, as seen from the top of Observation Hill

Ford E-Series vans, modified for the conditions including a 20-speed transmission and snow tires, powered by 7.3 Liter Turbodiesel V-8s, are also used in both 4x4 and 6x6 versions. One called the Ice Challenger set a land speed record to the pole in 70 hours. Also Ford E-250 and 350 superduty trucks are used, and, again have to be modified and change is to put heaters on most components, and snow tired or track wheels. McMurdo operates about 60 superduty trucks in the 21st century. There are hundreds of vehicles at McMurdo, but also many different types: these fall into several categories based on where they are normally used. This include rock and/or ice road, local ice, traverse, ice edge, remote site, and inland station. This includes vehicles like pickup trucks, M274 Mule utility truck, Foremost Delta 2, Tucker Sno-Cat (1700 series), Thiokol Sprytes, M51 Dump Truck, and Caterpillar bulldozers and loaders such as the D8, as well as other types such snowmobiles like the Bombardier Elan. Sleds (aka Sledges) of various types and sizes have also been used, such as those pulled by a ski-do (snowmobile).

One of the newer vehicles for the 21st century, is the Kress vehicle, a custom-built people hauler, especially for going to and from the airfields and ice shelf.

There is a road from McMurdo to the New Zealand Scott Base, and open since 2005, an ice road and glacial traverse to the South Pole called the South Pole Traverse or McMurdo-South Pole highway.

Dogs, including dog sled teams, have been banned from Antarctica since 1994, not because they were not useful but rather they were spreading canine diseases to seals.

Nansen sleds pulled by a snowmobile is an important form of transport over snow at McMurdo Station, and larger sleds are also used to haul tons of supplies to field camps. Driving a snowmobile on open areas has a danger that snow can obscure a crevasse in the ice, especially glacial ice shear zone near McMurdo.

=== Historical vehicles ===
The M29 Weasel was used in the 1950s, including to help establish McMurdo Station.

In 1994, a Foremost Terra snow bus would be delivered to McMurdo Station, and dubbed Ivan the Terra Bus (a pun on Ivan the Terrible). Ivan the Terra is a snow coach that weighs 67,000 pounds (30,000 kg) empty and has been in service several decades. The word Terra is the name of the snow bus made by the company Foremost, and this type of vehicle is also used in the Canadian Arctic. It is an extreme-duty tri-axle bus with very large tires, and Ivan is powered by a 300-horsepower (220 kW) Cat engine, and it can normally transport 56 people at 25 miles per hour (40 km/h). Despite its size, its very soft on the ground delivering only 15 psi (100 kPa) of ground pressure.

The bus was remembered for its frequent trips to the airfields and locations around McMurdo, and had an impressive capacity and ability to overcome difficult conditions. The vehicle was fondly remembered by those that had served at McMurdo, and it was retired to ChristChurch, New Zealand where it is hoped it can go to a museum rather than be scrapped.

In the 1988-89 season a hovercraft was tested, and was used for a few years thereafter.

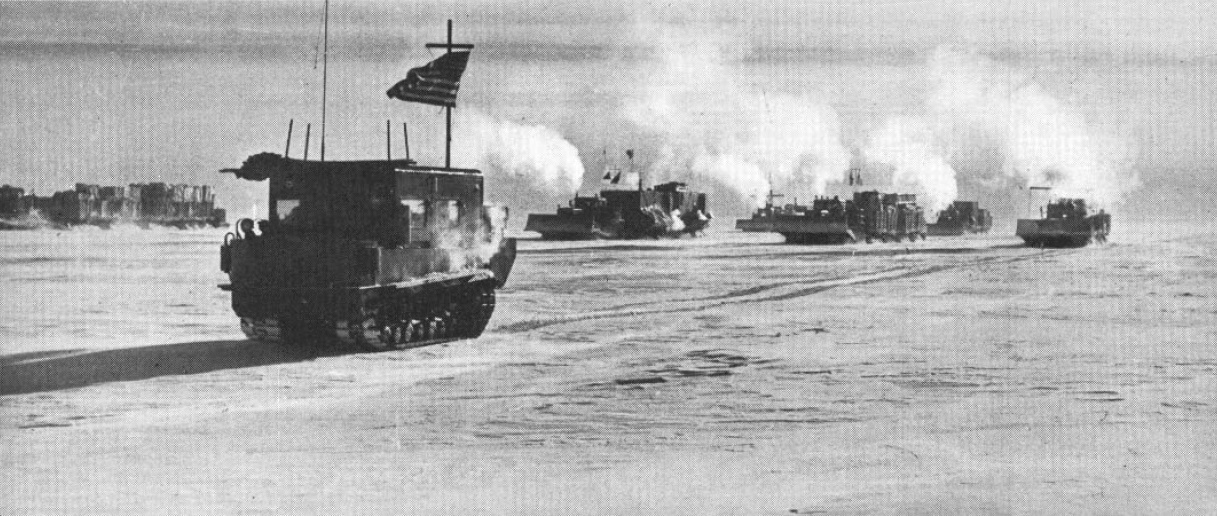
An Antarctic supply convoy led by a M29 Weasel, circa 1958

=== Ice ===
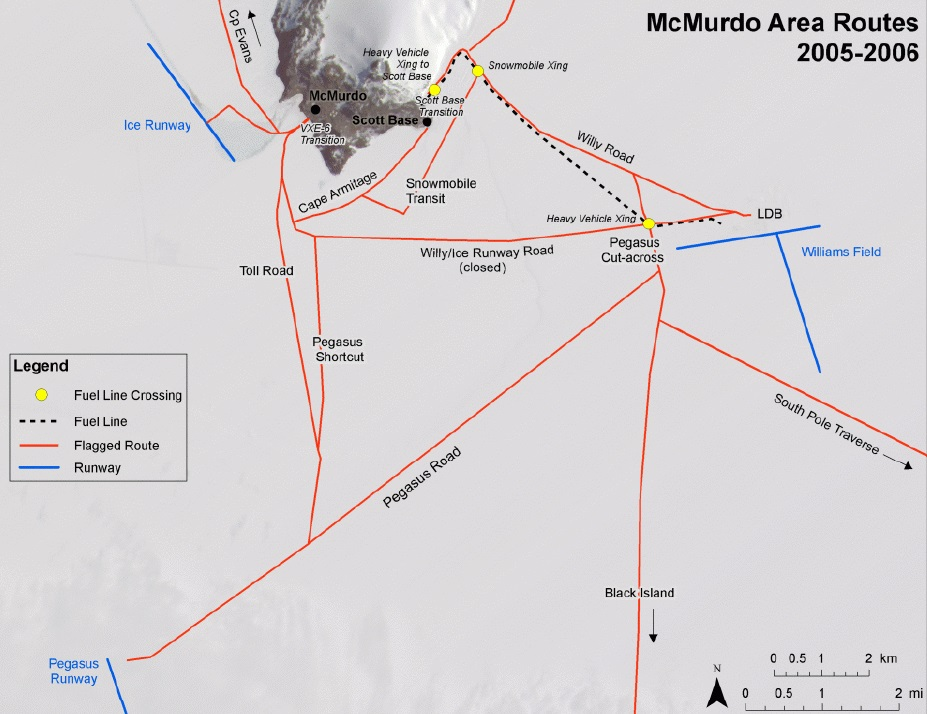
Map showing ice traverses to airstrips at that time. Pegasus Airfield has been replaced by Phoenix Airfield

The McMurdo-South Pole traverse, is a seasonal, over 1,000-mile (1,600 km) snow and ice road that crosses the frozen Ross Sea, glaciers, and the Antarctic ice cap to reach the South Pole. It was first opened at the end of 2005, though it must be maintained each year to check for new crevasses and clear new snow. It has reduced the number of flights to the South Pole, by enabling the bulk transport and fuel and cargo across the surface, and has also been used for adventuring records. Dive huts are taken out on the frozen sea ice to facilitate doing dives.

There can be a seasonal trail between McMurdo to Scott Base called the Cape Armitage Loop Trail, over the sea ice.

== Sea ==
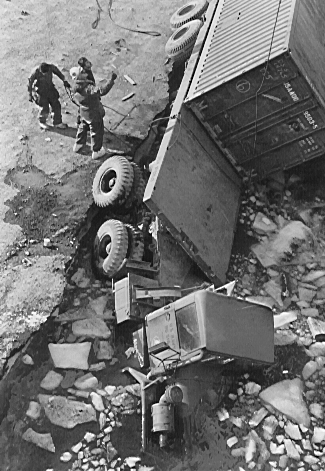
Truck falls through ice pier, 1983

McMurdo has the world's most southerly harbor, important for bringing supplies to McMurdo and supporting projects in the Antarctic, but weather conditions necessitate an icebreaker. An example of a resupply ship is the MV American Tern, which was chartered from 2001–2010.

McMurdo harbor has been opened by USCGC Polar Star which comes every year to McMurdo from Seattle. Access to ships in the harbor is can be done via an ice pier, though a modular causeway was in development. A modular floating marine causeway system was used in January 2025. Once the pass is open other types of ships can arrive include sealift, research, auxiliary vessels, and others bringing supplies and supporting research operations in Antarctica.

For Operation Deep Freeze 2025, the ship Ocean Gladiator brought supplies to McMurdo Station for the 2024–2025 season, arriving in late January 2025. For this year the marine causeway system, rather than an ice pier was used. The marine causeway consists of floating modular sections that when assembled allow the cargo to be offloaded.

== Air ==
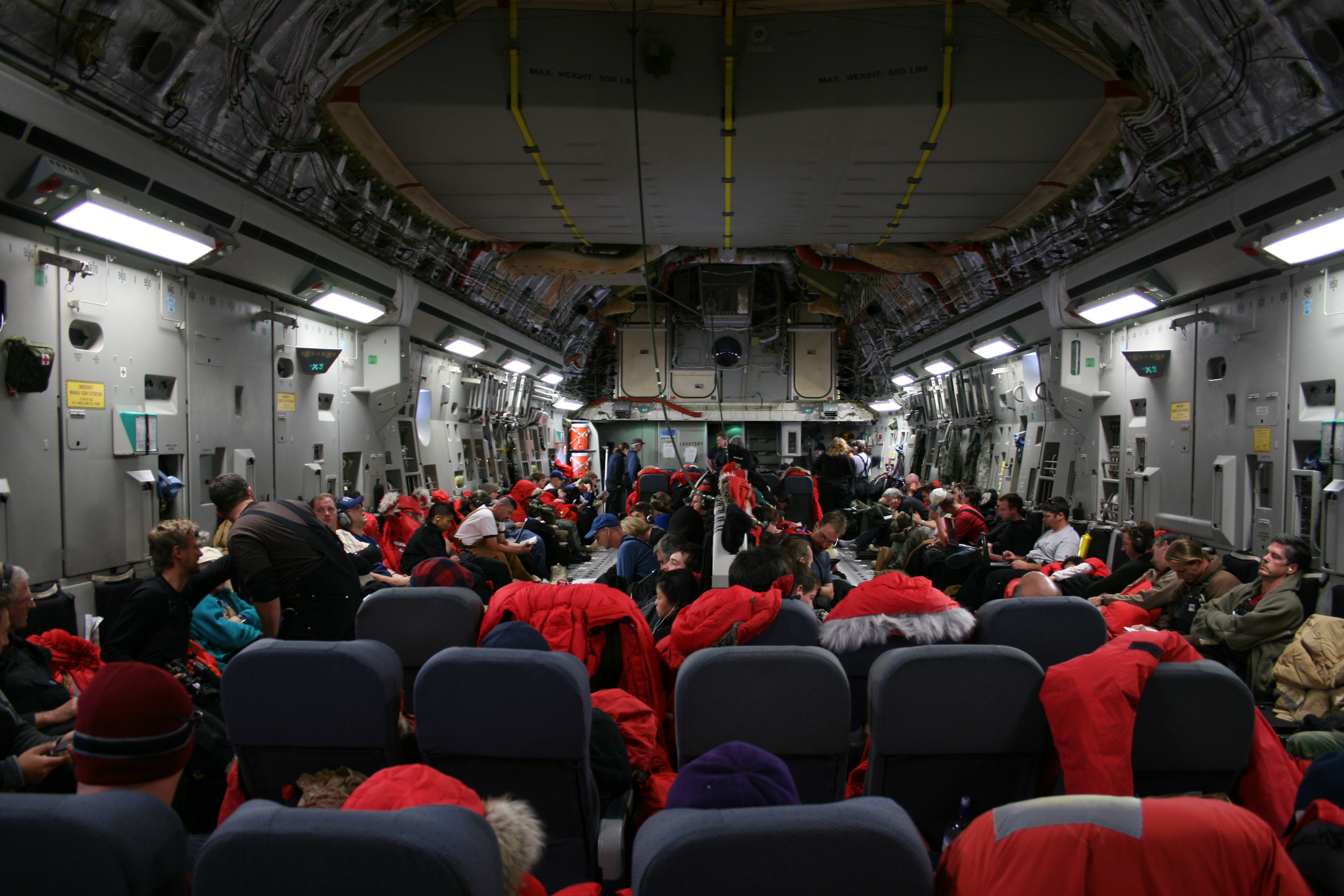
Loaded C-17 heads to McMurdo Station

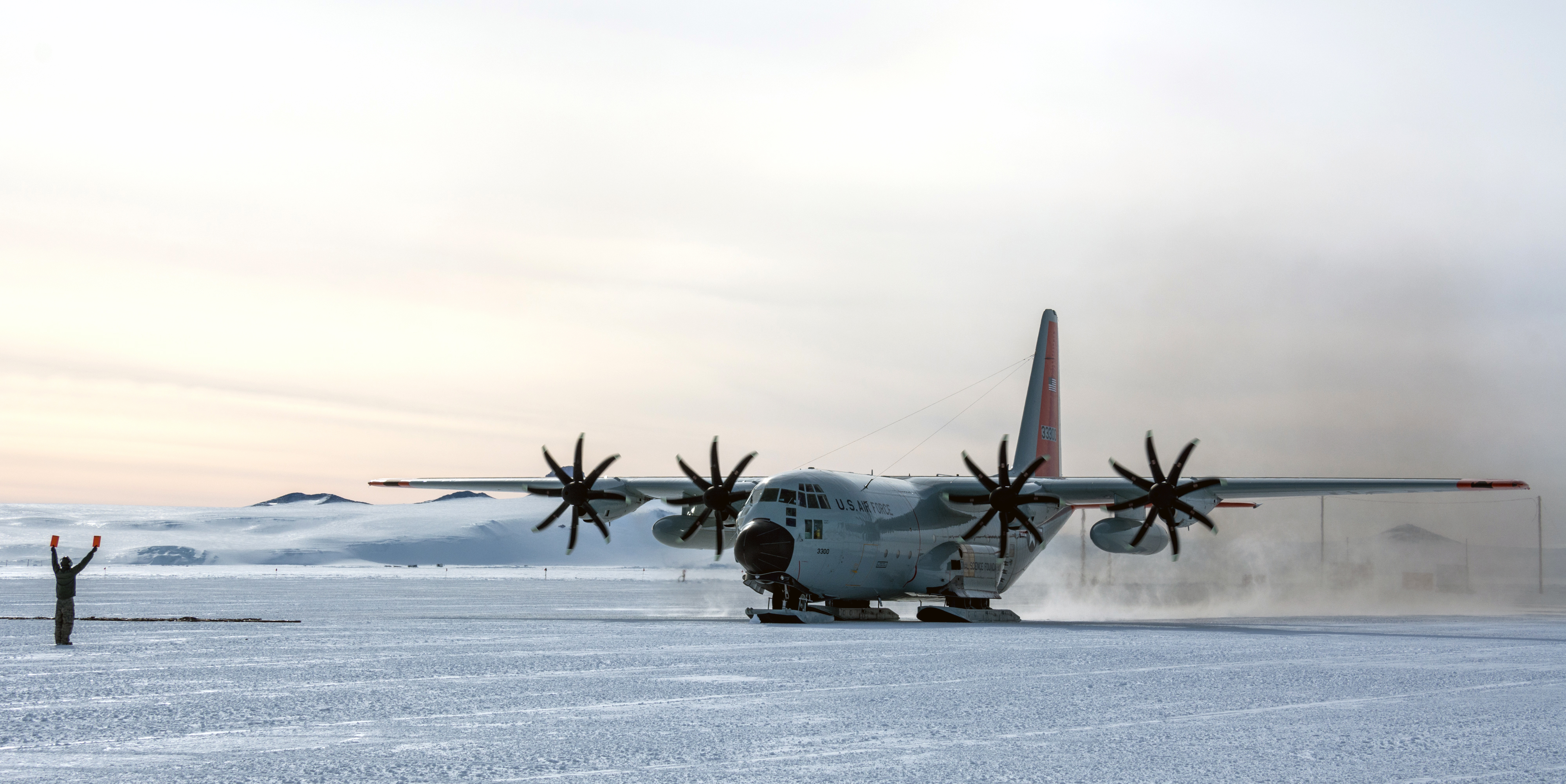
LC-130 lands at Williams Field

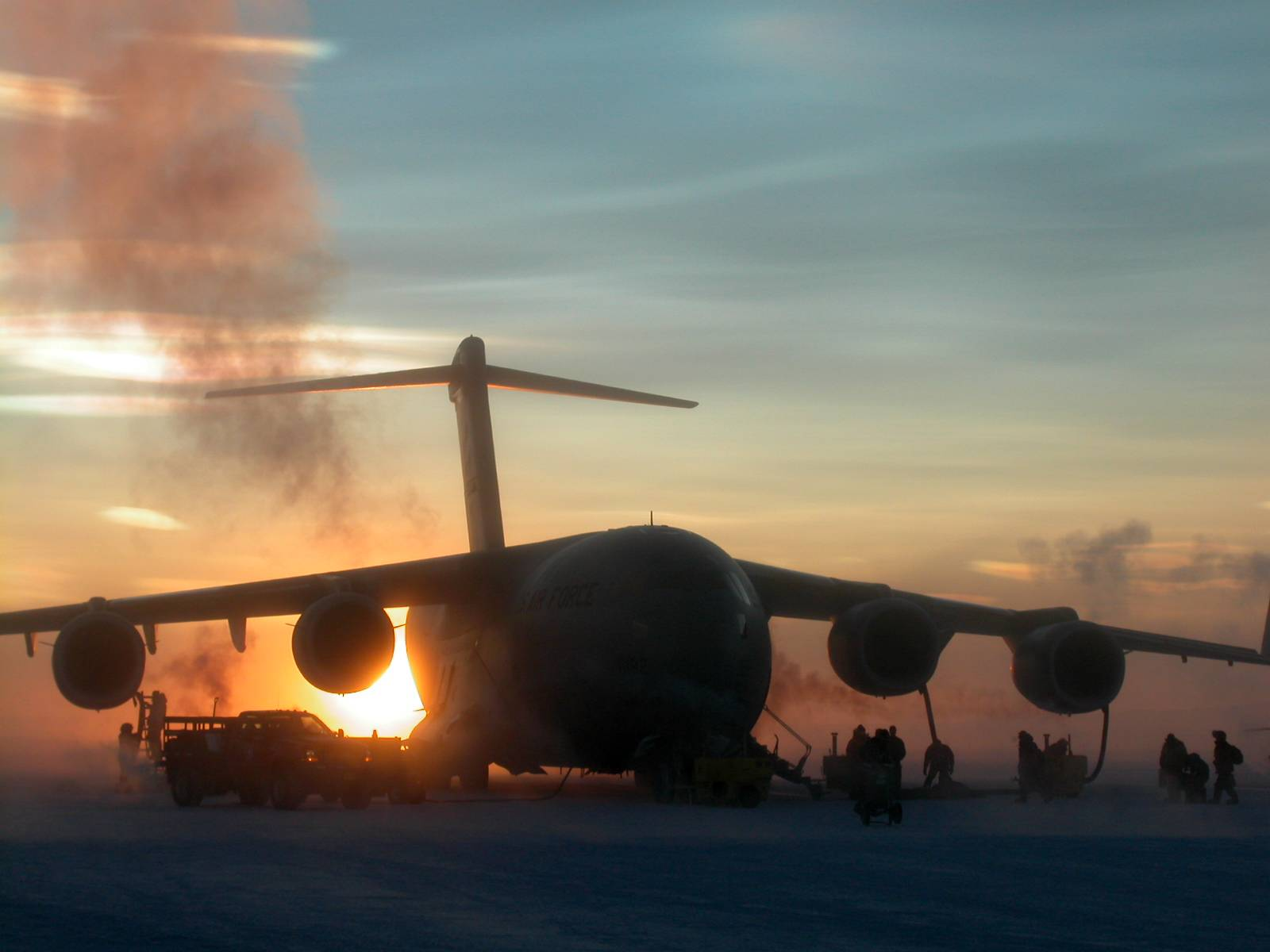
C-17 at sunset, 2007

McMurdo Station is serviced seasonally from Christchurch Airport in New Zealand, about 2,440 miles (3,920 km) away by air, with C-17 Globemaster and Lockheed LC-130, by two airports:

- Phoenix Airfield (ICAO: NZFX), a compacted snow runway which replaced Pegasus Field (ICAO: NZPG) in 2017
- Williams Field (ICAO: NZWD), a permanent snow runway for ski-equipped aircraft.

Historically, a seasonal Ice Runway (NZIR) was used until December though this has fallen out favor of the compacted snow runway of Phoenix airfield since 2017. The ice runway was built out over frozen sea ice in the late months of the year, after the polar dawn started but before the sea ice broke up.

Aircraft are important part of the supply chain to McMurdo. Winter fly in, or WinFly as it is called brings is supplies by air. Just one C-17 flight for WinFly in 2021–2022 Operation Deep Freeze brought in 100 personnel and nearly 50 thousand pounds of supplies. The first WinFly occurred starting in 1967, and marks the shift from the winter period to the busy summer at McMurdo.

Supplies can be air dropped from about ten thousand feet altitude on pallets, without having to land.

On 16 October 1958, a Douglas C-124C Globemaster II (52-1017) of the USAF crashed into a 3200-foot mountain near Cape Hallett Bay while maneuvering, killing 7 of the 13 occupants. The Globemaster was on an airdrop flight from Christchurch, New Zealand to McMurdo Station but navigational errors occurred prior to the crash.

The USAF flew regular C-130 Hercules to McMurdo for the 2024-25 season for the first time.

In October 1957, a Pan American Boeing Model 377 Stratocruiser was flown to McMurdo Station to evaluate commercial flights to the station. In 2013, a NASA P-3 Orion was landed at McMurdo's ice runway.

In August 2025, the RNZAF evacuated 3 from McMurdo station for medical reasons during the difficult 24-night period of cold and challenging weather conditions. The nearly 20 hour flight mission New Zealand has challenges at this time of year, and the US Chargé d’Affaires for New Zealand thanked New Zealand on international news.

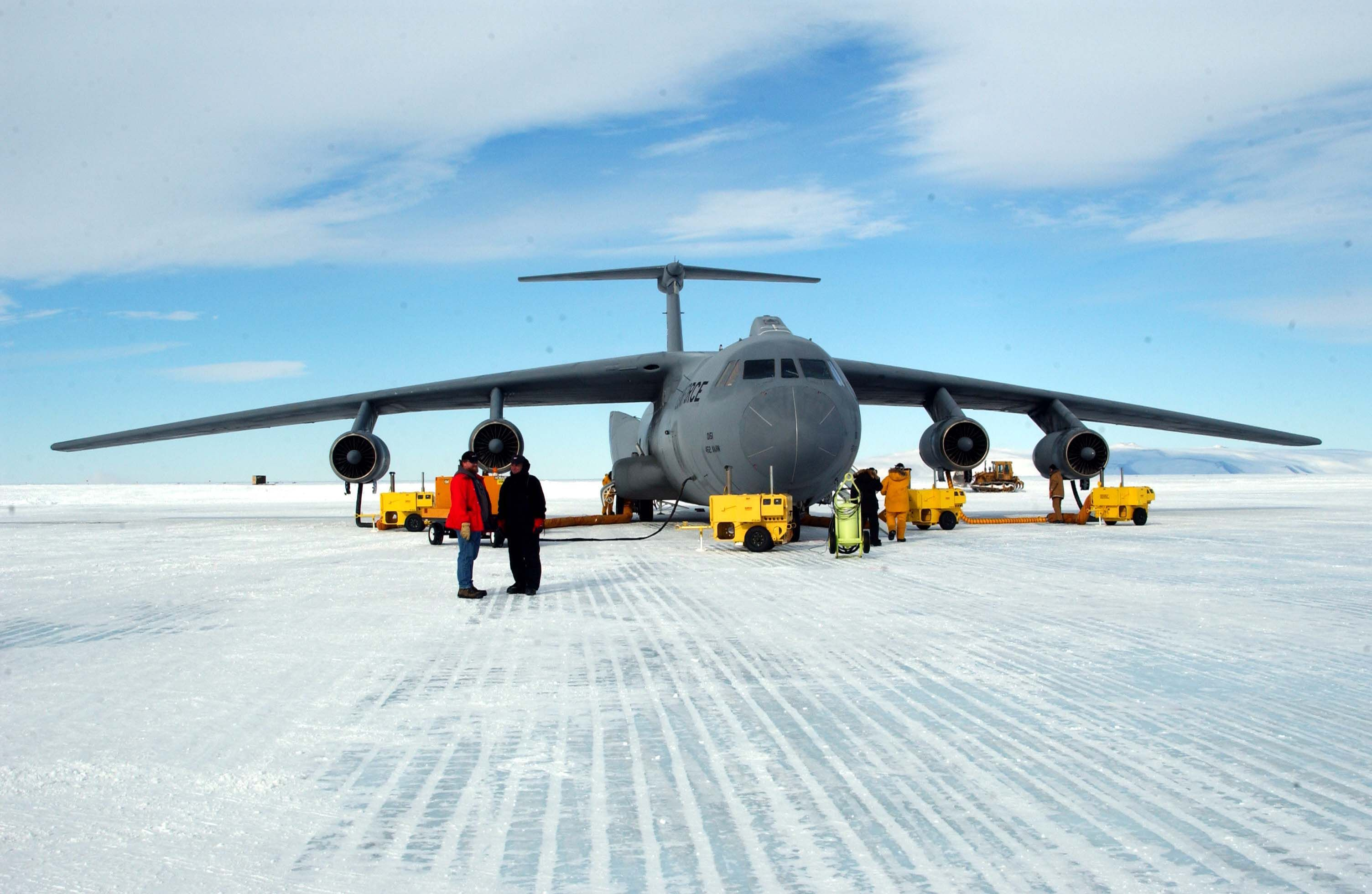
C-141 Starlifter being heated on the runway near McMurdo

=== Helicopters ===
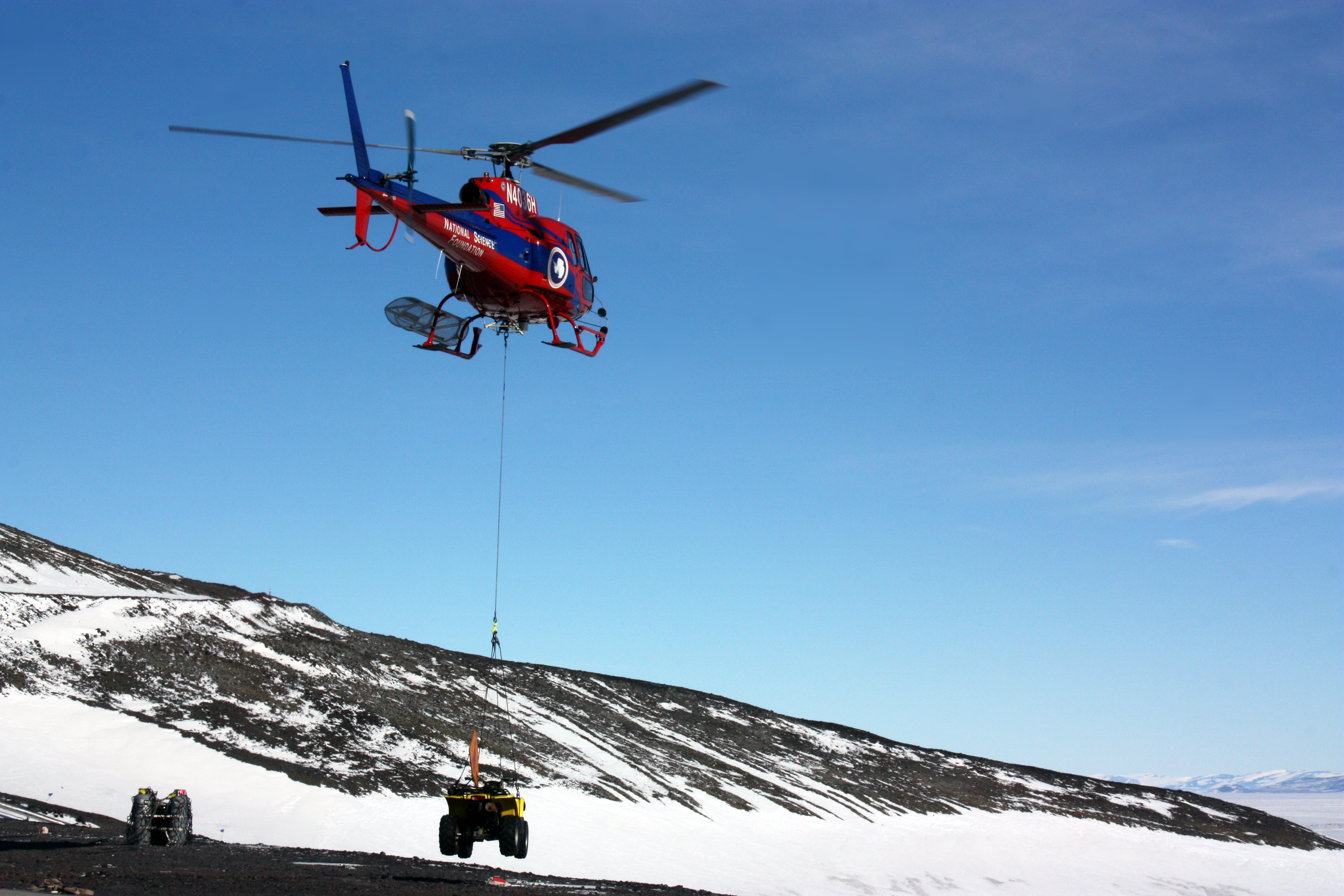
NSF Helicopter departs McMurdo heliport for Black Island, with an ATV slung

McMurdo Station has a helicopter base, with several pads and a maintenance facility. The helicopters support operations in the area, such as trips to the McMurdo Dry Valleys. Also, there is a helicopter refueling station across the channel at Marble Point.

Helicopters are very important for transportation, because of the lack of roads, rugged terrain, and distance to field stations. However, the weather and wind conditions can make operations difficult.

In 2020, there were four helicopters stationed at McMurdo heliport. There was two AS350B and two Bell 412, and these support trips of up to 80 km from the base. In the 21st century, Bell 212 were also used.

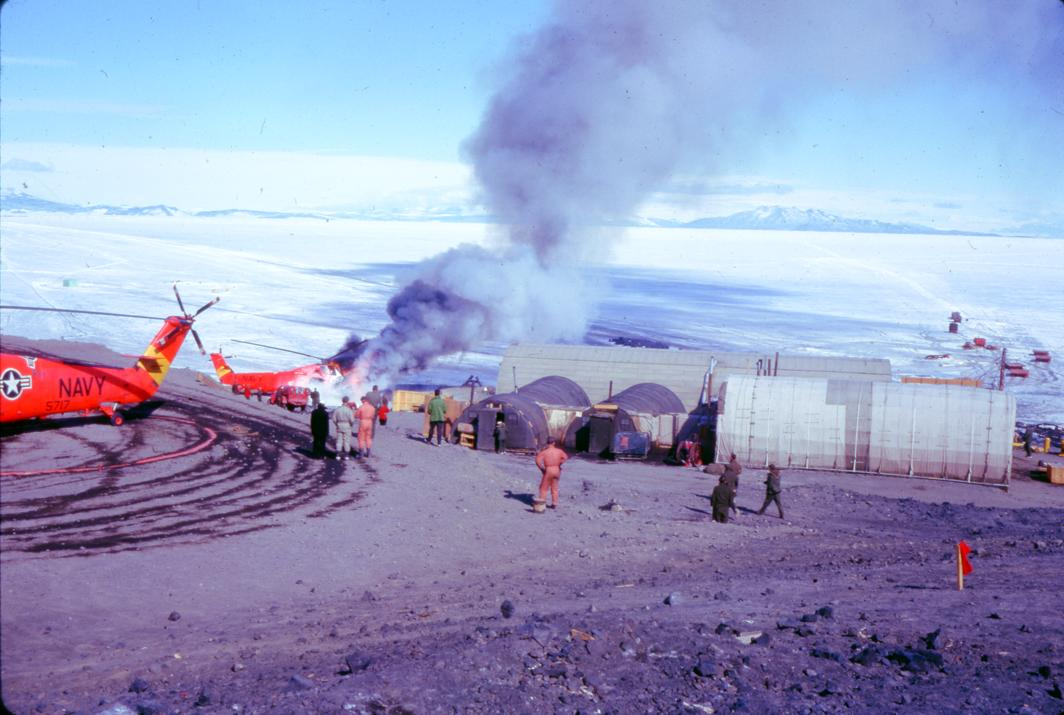
Navy H-34 on fire at McMurdo Station in the 1962-63 season

In the 1960s, Army UH-1B helicopters supported surveys and operations in Antarctica. They were not only operated out of McMurdo, but supported other bases and made the first helicopter flight to the south pole. The Hueys were turbine powered which offered a number of advantages including: could fly to 13,000 feet, could carry average payload 2,000 pounds, were easier to start in cold compared to a piston-engine helicopter, and could be carried LC-130 transport aircraft (the ski-equipped fixed wing transport Hercules). The Army UH-1B used for Operation Deep Freeze including out of McMurdo Station had a bright orange paint livery. An orange Army UH-1B was the first helicopter to reach the south pole in February 1963, and is preserved at the U.S. Army Transportation Museum at Fort Eustis, Virginia.

The Navy used H-34 helicopters in the 1950s out McMurdo Station, and later UH-1N helicopters.

In 1963, a CH-19E Chicksaw and HU1-B (UH-1B) were delivered by ship to McMurdo Station.

=== WinFly ===
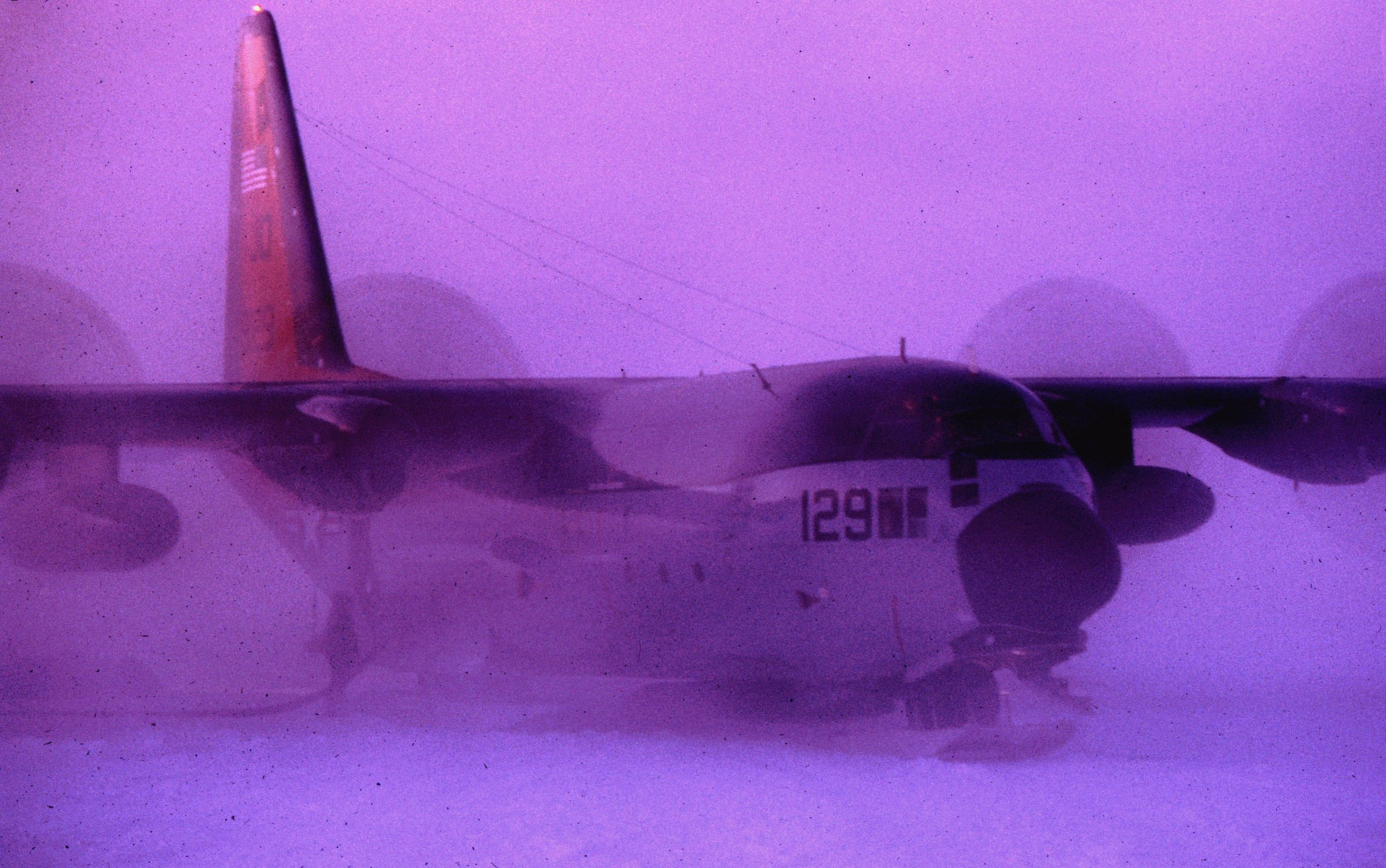
C-130 Hercules refueling in ice fog at Williams Field for the Winfly event of 1974.

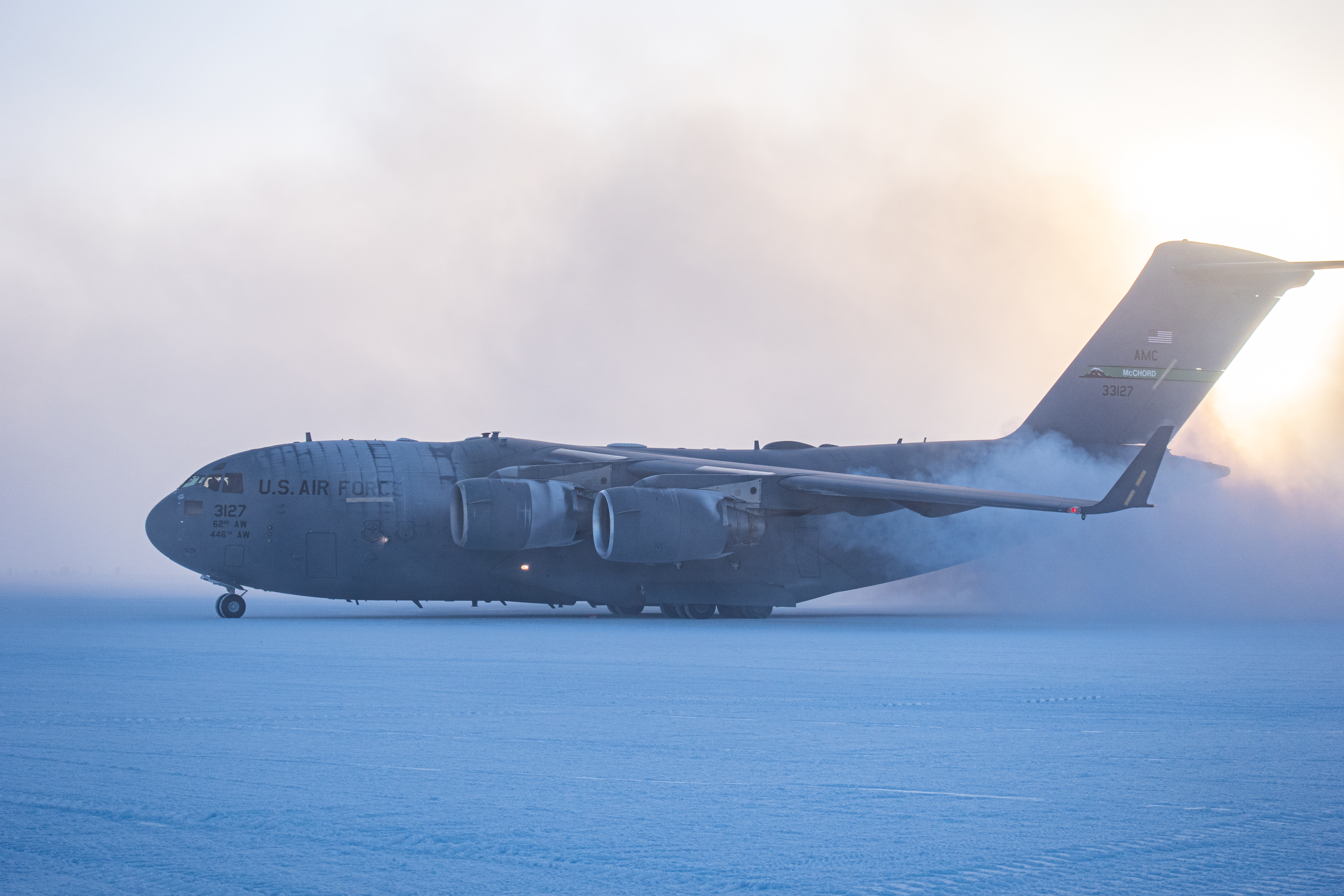
A C-17 lands for the first flight of the austral summer in August 2020 for the 2020-2021 season

Winfly designates the arrival of the first regularly scheduled aircraft at McMurdo Station after the base has been closed to access during the winter. The flights occurred starting in 1967 and every year thereafter. The flights, which occur in August, bring in additional personnel needed to get the base ready for summer operations beginning in October. The temperature upon arrival is typically −40 °C (−40 °F). 2016 might have been the last WinFly, with the base beginning year-round operations the next year.

WinFly is a portmanteau of Winter Fly In, and brings supplies by air to McMurdo before the harbor is open. Just one C-17 flight for WinFly in 2021–2022 Operation Deep Freeze brought in 100 personnel and nearly 50 thousand pounds of supplies. Winfly is part of Operation Deep Freeze, a joint service interagency mission by the United States Antarctica Program. WinFly is an important part of Operation Deep Freeze, the largest peacetime operation that brings supplies to Antarctica, involving different agencies but managed by the NSF. The first flights organize and depart from Christchurch, New Zealand to head down to Antarctica.

WinFly also means the end of over-wintering for some staff, but the start of work at McMurdo for others; in 2023 the first WinFly flight in August brought in 100 staff, but also flew out about 40 people.

The first WINFLY flight was in 1967 in June and August, that season there was three LC-130 participated, though the number and type of aircraft has varied. In 1998 for example, it was planned to use five C-141 Starlifters for WinFly.

In 1968, WinFly was delayed until September by very cold temperatures.

The WinFly flights start the increase in population. For example, one year the over-wintering population was 148, and WinFly increased this to 476. Eventually the austral summer would increase it over 1000 before the season was over. When Winfly for 2007 wrapped up in late August, it had brought in 355 passengers to McMurdo Station.

== See also ==
- Transport in Antarctica
- List of airports in Antarctica
- Ross Ice Shelf
- Black Island (Ross Archipelago) (Island directly south of Ross Island, and slightly West of White Island))
- White Island (Ross Archipelago) (Island directly south of Ross Island, and slightly East of Black Island)
